= Domingo Méndez Capote =

Cuban lawyer and revolutionary soldier who served as Vice President of Cuba

Jurist of the Mambisa Revolution Domingo Méndez Capote
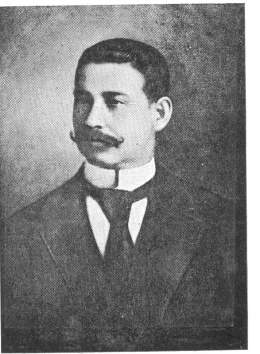

Vice President of the Republic in Arms
- In office September 1897 – May 1899
- President: Bartolomé Masó
- Preceded by: Bartolomé Masó Márquez

2nd Vice President of Cuba
- In office January 1906 – September 1906
- President: Tomás Estrada Palma
- Preceded by: Luis Estévez y Romero
- Succeeded by: Alfredo Zayas y Alfonso

President of the Senate of Cuba
- In office 8 May 1902 – 5 April 1905
- Preceded by: New position
- Succeeded by: Manuel Sanguily Garritte

Civil Governor of Matanzas Province and Las Villas Province
- In office March 1896 – January 1897

Secretary of State and the Interior for the Military Government of Cuba
- In office January 1899 – December 1899

Personal details
- Born: May 12, 1863 Lagunillas, Matanzas Province, Captaincy General of Cuba
- Died: June 16, 1934 (aged 71) Havana, Cuba
- Party: Cuban Revolutionary Party
- Other political affiliations: Cuban National Party; Republican Party of Havana
- Spouse: María de los Ángeles Chaple de Méndez Capote
- Children: 3, including Renée Méndez Capote

Military service
- Branch: Cuban Liberation Army
- Rank: Brigadier General
- Conflict: Cuban War of Independence; Battle of Palo Prieto; Battle of Arroyo Blanco; Battle of Juan Criollo

Domingo Méndez Capote (May 12, 1863 – June 16, 1934) was a Cuban lawyer, military officer, and politician who played a significant role in the Cuban War of Independence and the early years of the Republic of Cuba. He was the 2nd-serving Vice President of Cuba. Other roles he held over the years include; President of the Constituent Convention, Vice President of the Cuban Republic in Arms, President of the Senate of Cuba, Professor of the University of Havana faculty of Law, Dean of the Havana Bar Association, in three terms, Secretary of the Government for the military government of Cuba, and representative of several foreign houses.

== Early life and legal career ==
Domingo Méndez Capote was born on the San Francisco estate in Lagunillas, Matanzas Province during the Captaincy General of Cuba. This town, which today has a population of approximately 600, was renamed |Méndez Capote in 1899, in his honor. (Coordinates: 22.950710674986055°N 81.20955898386673°W) Méndez Capote came from the wealthy Spanish family that owned the San Francisco estate where he was born.

Méndez Capote's older brother, Fernando, was among the 45 medical students involved in the controversial events of 1871, which led to the execution of eight young Cubans by Spanish Volunteers. Fernando was sentenced to six years in prison, but he was released several months later. Fernando was exiled, first to Spain, where he continued his medical studies. He later supported the Cuban Liberation Army from abroad, primarily from Mexico, and was granted the rank of commander for his contributions.

Fernando's actions and his exile were a great influence on the young Méndez Capote. Following the exile of his brother, the family experienced financial difficulties, but Domingo was still able to complete his law studies at the University of Havana in 1888.

To support himself financially through his further education, Méndez Capote worked as a laborer and home tutor. He earned degrees in Civil and Canon Law, Philosophy and Letters, and Administrative and Notary Law. He obtained his Doctor of Laws title in 1894.

From 1888 to 1895, he practiced law in Havana and taught Natural Law and Comparative Commercial Law at the university. He was able to secure a decent income working as a jurist for the university, but despite this, his involvement in the independence movement began in 1894 while he was still at the university, when he joined José Martí’s Cuban Revolutionary Party.

== Cuban War of Independence (1895–1899) ==
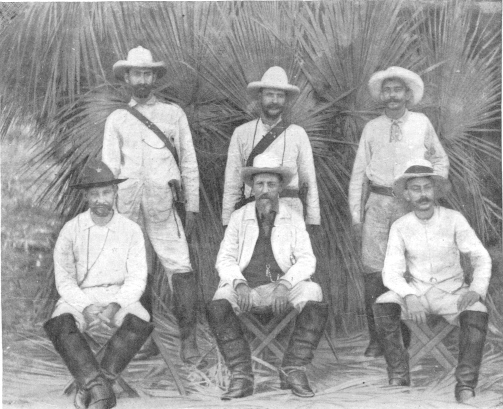
Executive government of the Cuban Republic in Arms. Ernesto Fons Sterling, Secretary of the Treasury; Vice-President Mendez Capote; Andrés Moreno de la Torre, Secretary of Foreign Affairs; President Bartolomé Masó; José B. Aleman, Secretary of War; Manuel Ramon Silva, Secretary of the Interior.

At the outbreak of the Cuban War of Independence, Méndez Capote abandoned his law practice to join the Mambi forces under General Maximo Gomez.

In February 1896, Méndez Capote enlisted in the Cuban Liberation Army at the Matilde sugar mill near Camajuaní, in the province of Las Villas. His enlistment was under the command of Leoncio Vidal, who granted him the rank of captain due to his university education.

By March 1896, the Governing Council, led by Salvador Cisneros Betancourt, promoted him to the rank of Colonel. During this time, he participated in several military engagements, including the Battle of Palo Prieto, when the forces of the Fourth Corps of the Mambí Army, under the command of Major General Serafín Sánchez, fought for more than seven hours against a column led by the Spanish General Oliver, having many casualties on both sides.

Following his promotion, he was appointed Civil Governor of Las Villas, a position he held until January 1897.

On January 17, 1897, he was appointed head of the Superior Chief of the Military Legal Corps and was responsible for drafting the criminal laws governing the revolutionary forces, and promoted to Brigadier General. He also served as Chief of the Military Legal Corps of the Revolution. In that mission, restructured the Military Organic Law and drafted the Criminal Code, the Military Prosecution Law and the Regulation of the Legal-Military Corps of the Republic in Arms. In these documents he suggested the death penalty for anyone who maintained contact with the enemy without taking into account the absolute independence of Cuba.

On February 2, 1897, he participated, under the command of Máximo Gómez, in the capture of Arroyo Blanco, and in the Battle of Juan Criollo where he was in the machete charge with other university students in what Gómez described with his fine irony as "the burden of doctors."

As a representative for the Fourth Army Corps, he participated in the Assembly of La Yaya in October 1897, where he was elected President of the Constituent Convention, which was responsible for drafting Cuba’s first constitution, the La Yaya Constitution.

Méndez Capote was later elected by the convention as Vice President of the Republic in Arms under General Bartolomé Masó, serving from October 1897 to October 1898.

== Service in the Republic of Cuba ==
Following the Cuban War of Independence, Méndez Capote played a crucial role in the early political and legal organization of the newly formed republic. While he was not a military strategist known for battlefield victories, his contributions in civil governance were instrumental in stabilizing the revolutionary leadership. During the period of U.S. military intervention, he was appointed Secretary of State and the Interior in the administration of General John R. Brooke, serving from January to December 1899.

Méndez Capote was later elected President and Rapporteur of the Commission of the Constituent Assembly that traveled to Washington for negotiations concerning the Platt Amendment. This amendment, which stipulated the conditions for U.S. intervention in Cuban affairs, has led to historical debate over Méndez Capote’s stance on Cuban sovereignty. While some critics labeled him as annexationist, he argued that the U.S. had already claimed the right to intervene under the Monroe Doctrine, regardless of Cuban consent. He attempted to negotiate limitations on such interventions, seeking to ensure Cuban autonomy as much as possible.

Recognizing that outright rejection of the amendment would likely lead to prolonged U.S. control, the commission worked to secure additional concessions, such as Cuban ownership of the Isle of Pines and improved trade conditions to aid the nation’s post-war recovery. The delegation ultimately faced a difficult choice between accepting the amendment or risking a U.S. protectorate similar to that of Puerto Rico.

=== 2nd Vice President of Cuba ===
During the presidency of Tomás Estrada Palma, Méndez Capote served as President of the Senate of Cuba from 8 May 1902 to 5 April 1905, and later briefly as Vice President from 1905 to 1906. He supported Estrada Palma’s policies, including the controversial 35-million-peso loan intended to pay the Liberation Army in 1903. Allegations of corruption surrounding this loan were never substantiated. The Estrada Palma administration prioritized education and healthcare, increasing the number of teachers to 3,500 by 1905—surpassing the number of soldiers in the regular army.

Méndez Capote distanced himself from Estrada Palma when the latter sought re-election, effectively withdrawing from national politics.

Tomás Estrada Palma and his entire cabinet resigned on September 28, 1906, due to the outbreak of a violent political crisis in Cuba. The crisis stemmed from widespread accusations of electoral fraud in his 1905 re-election, where he allegedly manipulated the vote to secure a second term against José Miguel Gómez. His government faced an armed rebellion, known as the Liberal Revolt of 1906, led by opposition forces demanding fair elections. When Estrada Palma refused to negotiate and sought U.S. military intervention, President Theodore Roosevelt instead decided to establish a temporary U.S. provisional government under Governor William Howard Taft. Rather than accept this intervention, Estrada Palma and his cabinet resigned in protest, effectively allowing the U.S. to assume control of Cuba. This would become known as the Provisional Government of Cuba.

Méndez Capote, however, did not inspire any confidence in Taft, and he also expressed that he had no desire to return to government under the occupation, and wished to remain in retirement.

Miguel Gomez then obtained the Presidency, serving until 1913.

He later re-emerged into the political sphere in 1924, when Mario García Menocal convinced him to run as Vice President in the election, against Gerardo Machado and Carlos de la Rosa Hernández. Machado's campaign, however, allegedly used fraudulent methods to come to power.

== Exile and Revolutionary Junta ==
As opposition to Cuban President Machado intensified, Domingo Méndez Capote emerged as a key figure in the revolutionary movement against his regime. Shortly before leaving Cuba for New York, he was chosen by the anti-Machado factions as the provisional president of Cuba in the event of the rebellion's success. Upon arriving in the United States, he established the headquarters of the revolutionary junta at the Biltmore Hotel, where he confidently predicted an "early and complete success" for the movement.

Méndez Capote was appointed president and general delegate of the revolutionary junta, which unified various opposition groups, including nationalists, intellectuals, university faculty, and student organizations. The New York-based faction, formally named the Republican Delegation of Cuba, was led by Méndez Capote as president, with Dr. Fernando Ortiz as vice president and his son, Dr. Francisco M. Capote, as secretary. This delegation was granted full authority to represent the Cuban revolutionary junta in its dealings abroad.

The junta in Cuba, alongside Méndez Capote, included prominent figures such as Colonel Carlos Mendieta, Dr. Roberto Méndez Peñate, General Mario García Menocal, and Dr. Miguel Mariano Gómez. Their stated mission was to overthrow Machado’s dictatorship and restore constitutional governance. Méndez Capote issued a statement affirming that the junta would appoint a provisional government to reestablish Cuba’s constitutional order.

On August 10, back in Cuba, Carlos Mendieta and Mario García Menocal landed forces at Rio Verde in an attempt to overthrow Gerardo Machado. They were defeated by 14 August in military operations that include the first use of military aviation in Cuba. These events are collectively known as the failed Cuban Revolution of 1931.

Despite the junta’s efforts, the rebellion against Machado faced significant challenges. Meanwhile, U.S. authorities detained suspected Cuban insurgents off the coast of Montauk Point but ultimately released them due to lack of evidence. The Cuban exiles, including former government officials and military figures, denied involvement in revolutionary activities, maintaining that they were engaged in swordfishing when apprehended.

While the immediate rebellion struggled, the movement Méndez Capote helped lead contributed to the eventual fall of Machado in 1933. His involvement in the revolutionary junta solidified his legacy as a steadfast opponent of dictatorship and an advocate for constitutional governance in Cuba.

== Return to Cuba and death ==
After the Cuban General Strike of 1933 ensured the fall of the Machado government, forcing the President into exile in The Bahamas, Méndez Capote returned to Cuba, residing in his home in Vedado.

He died shortly afterwards, on June 16, 1934. His children, Eugenio, Sarah, and Reneé Méndez Capote, were raised in the same residence, where Reneé later documented historical accounts of Vedado and its early residents.

https://digitalcollections.nypl.org/items/510d47de-4eb0-a3d9-e040-e00a18064a99
