= List of international trips made by Miguel Díaz-Canel =

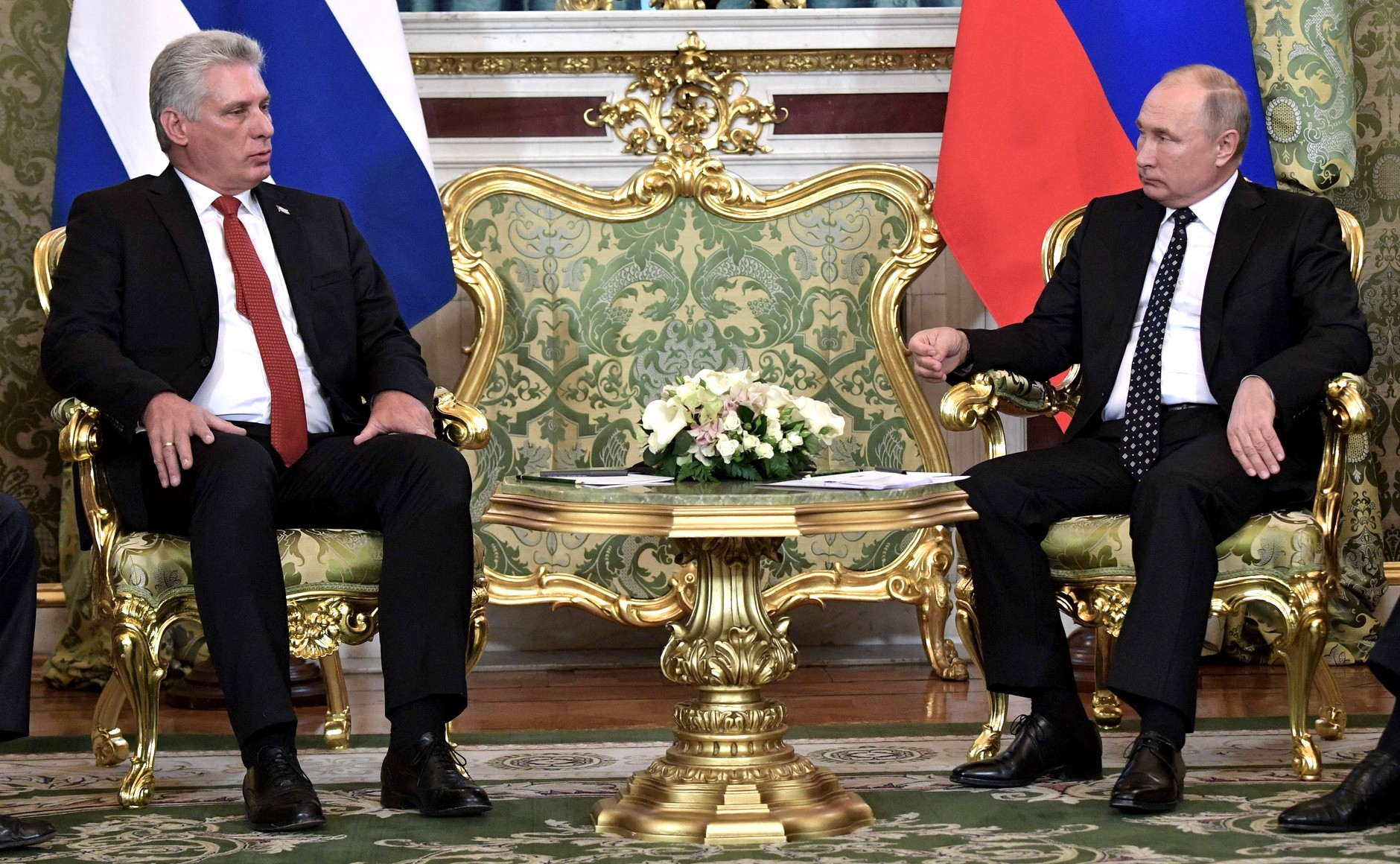
Díaz-Canel with Vladimir Putin in the Kremlin, November 2, 2018.

The following is an ongoing list of international trips made by Miguel Díaz-Canel, who held the office of President of the Cuban Council of State from 19 April 2018 to 10 October 2019, the President of Cuba since 10 October 2019 and has been the First Secretary of the Communist Party of Cuba (de facto leader) since 19 April 2021.

== Summary ==
The number of visits per country where President Díaz-Canel traveled are:

- One visit to Azerbaijan, Barbados, Belize, Iran, Ireland, Italy, Nicaragua, North Korea, Portugal, Saint Vincent and the Grenadines, Serbia, Turkey, the United Kingdom, the United States and the Vatican City
- Two visits to Algeria, Argentina, Belarus, China, France, Laos and Vietnam
- Four visits to Mexico
- Five visits to Russia
- Six visits to Venezuela

World map highlighting countries visited by Miguel Díaz-Canel during his leadership, as of August 2026. One visit Two visits Three visits Four visits Five visits Six visits Seven or more visits Cuba

== As President of the Council of State ==
=== 2018 ===
Country	Areas visited	Date(s)	Notes
Venezuela	Caracas	30 May	Official visit.
United States	New York	18 September	Attended the United Nations General Assembly.
France	Paris	1 November	Working visit in transit to Moscow. Met with Prime Minister Édouard Philippe.
Russia	Moscow	1–3 November	State visit.
North Korea	Pyongyang	4–6 November	State visit.
China	Beijing; Shanghai	6–10 November	State visit.
Vietnam	Hanoi	9–10 November	State visit.
Laos	Vientiane	10–11 November	State visit.
United Kingdom	London	12 November	Working visit in transit to Havana. Met with Leader of the Opposition and the Labour Party Jeremy Corbyn. He also met with Chancellor of the Exchequer Phillip Hammond.
Mexico	Mexico City	1 December	Attended the inauguration of AMLO.

=== 2019 ===
Country	Areas visited	Date(s)	Notes
Venezuela	Caracas	9–10 January	Second inauguration of Nicolás Maduro
Nicaragua	Managua	28–29 March	
Venezuela	Caracas	28 July	Official visit

== As President of the Republic ==
=== 2019 ===
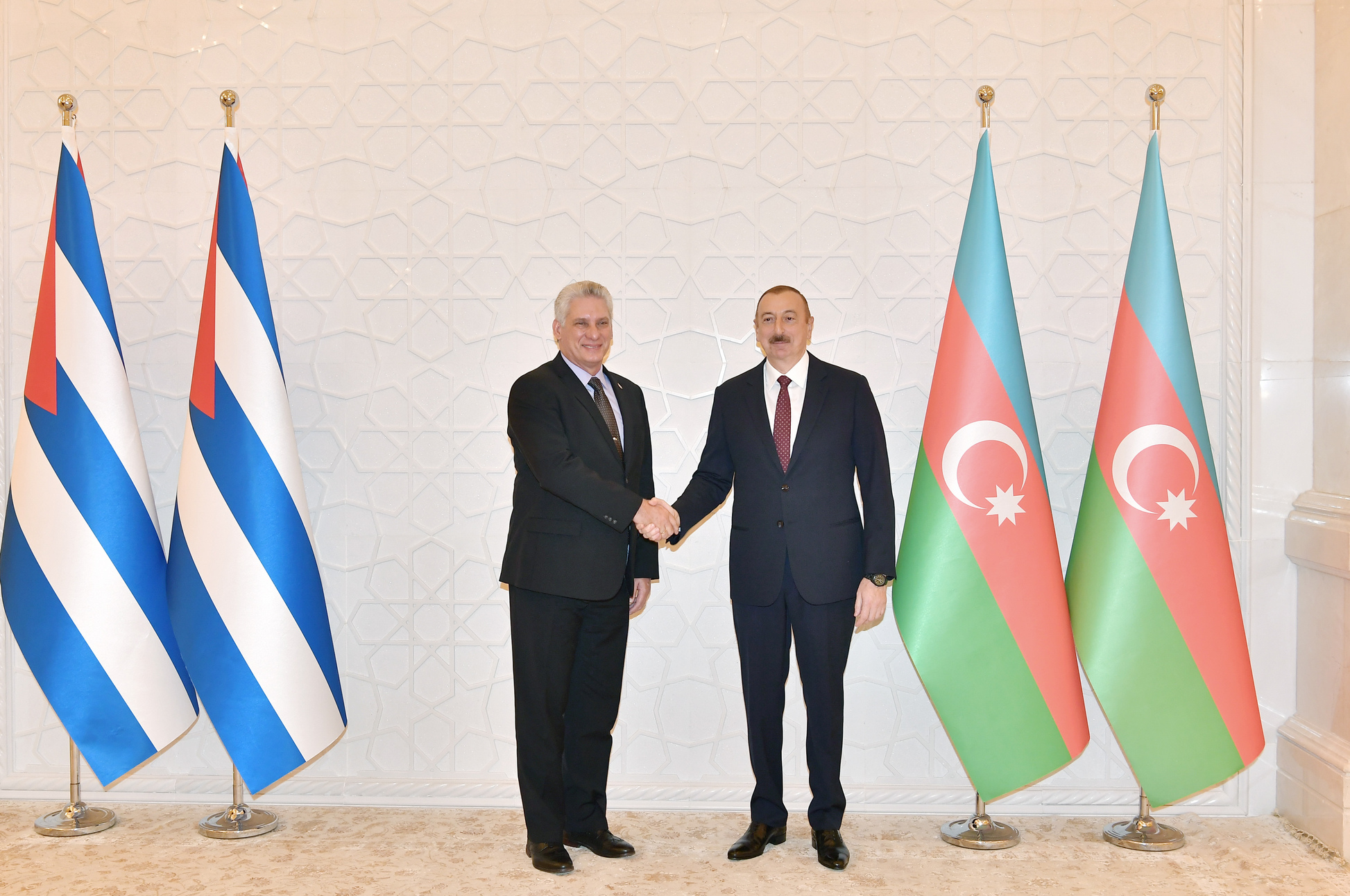
Diaz-Canel and Ilham Aliyev.

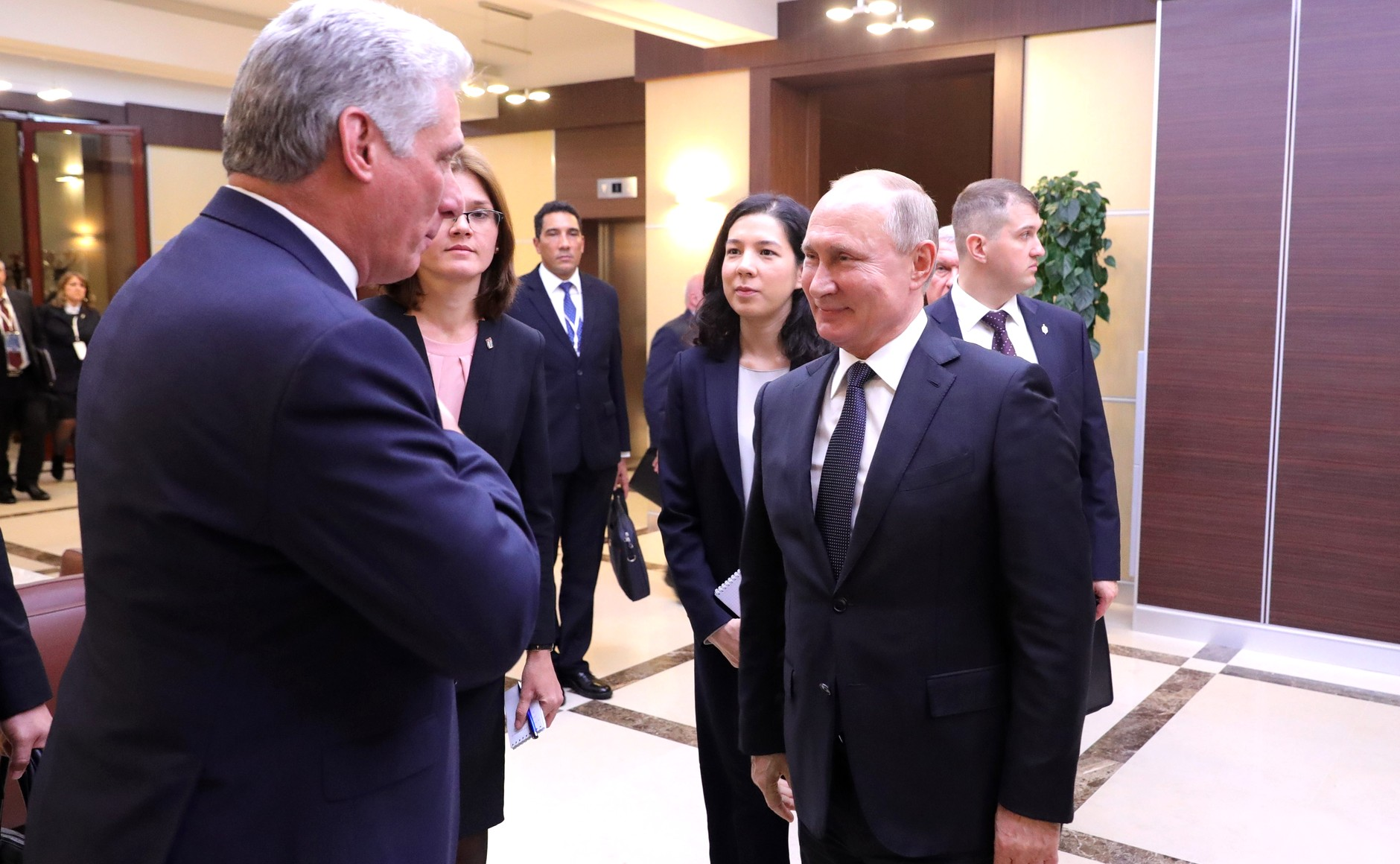
Diaz-Canel and Vladimir Putin at Novo-Ogaryovo, 29 October 2019.

Country	Areas visited	Date(s)	Notes
Mexico	Mexico City	17 October	State visit
Ireland	Dublin	18–21 October	State visit
Belarus	Minsk	23 October	State visit
Azerbaijan	Baku	25–27 October	Working visit and Non-Aligned Movement summit
Russia	Saint Petersburg, Moscow	27–29 October	Working visit
Argentina	Buenos Aires	10 December	Inauguration of Alberto Fernández

== As First Secretary and President ==
=== 2021 ===
Country	Areas visited	Date(s)	Notes
Venezuela	Caracas	27–28 August 2021	ALBA-TCP Summit 2021
Mexico	Mexico City	18 September 2021	CELAC Summit 2021

=== 2022 ===
Country	Areas visited	Date(s)	Notes
Algeria	Algiers	16–19 November	State visit. Met with Abdelmadjid Tebboune
Russia	Moscow	20–22 November	State visit. Met with Dmitry Medvedev and Vladimir Putin
Turkey	Ankara	23–24 November	State visit. Met with Recep Tayyip Erdoğan
China	Beijing	25 November	State visit. Met with Li Keqiang and Xi Jinping
Saint Vincent and the Grenadines	Kingstown	3–5 December	State visit. Met with Ralph Gonsalves
Barbados	Bridgetown	6 December	Caribbean Community summit

=== 2023 ===
Country	Areas visited	Date(s)	Notes
Argentina	Buenos Aires	24–25 January	Attended the CELAC Summit 2023
Venezuela	Caracas	26 January	State visit. Met with Nicolas Maduro.
Mexico	Campeche	11–12 February	State visit. Met with Andres Manuel Lopez Obrador.
Belize	Belmopan	12–13 February	State visit. Met with Froyla Tzalam and John Briceño. Addressed Parliament.
Serbia	Belgrade	20 June	State visit. Met with Aleksandar Vučić.
Vatican	Vatican City	21 June	Working visit.
Italy	Rome	21 June	Working visit.
France	Paris	22 June	Working visit.
Portugal	Lisbon	14 July	State visit. Met with Marcelo Rebelo de Sousa.
Iran	Tehran	4 December	State visit. Met with Ebrahim Raisi and Ali Khamenei.

=== 2024 ===
Country	Areas Visited	Date(s)	Notes
Venezuela	Caracas	24 April	Attended the XXIII summit of the ALBA-TCP
Russia	Moscow	8–9 May	2024 Moscow Victory Day Parade
Algeria	Algiers	10 May	Stopover.

=== 2025 ===
Country	Areas Visited	Date(s)	Notes
Russia	Saint Petersburg, Moscow	8–9 May	Attended the 2025 Moscow Victory Day Parade.
Belarus	Minsk	25–27 June	State visit.
Vietnam	Hanoi	31 August – 2 September	State visit. Met with General Secretary Tô Lâm. Attended the 80th anniversary celebrations of Vietnamese independence.
China	Beijing	2–6 September	Attended the 2025 China Victory Day Parade. Met with General Secretary Xi Jinping.
Laos	Vientiane	6–7 September	State visit. Met with General Secretary Thongloun Sisoulith.
