= Roberto Morales Ojeda =

Cuban physician and politician

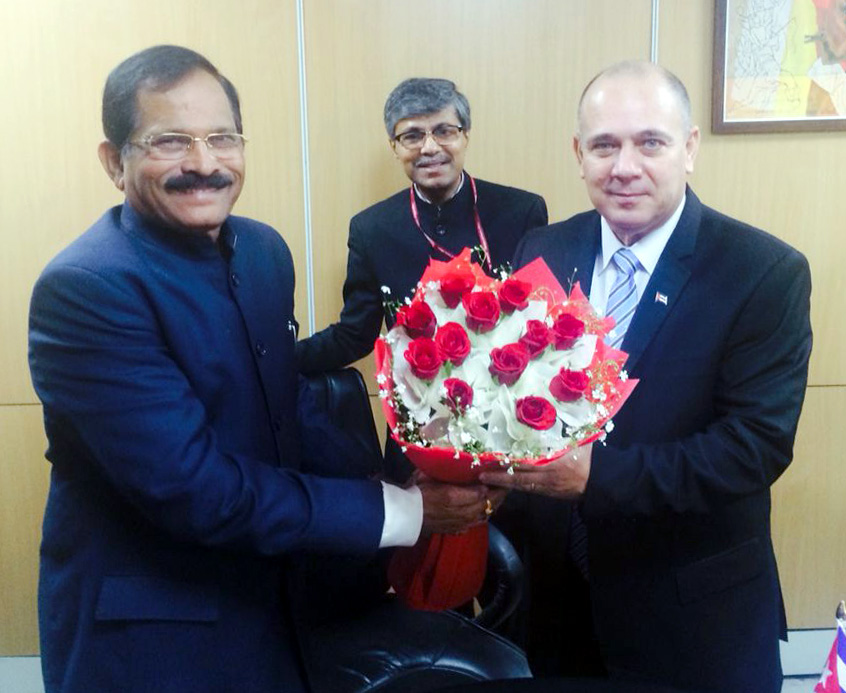
- The Minister of Public Health, Cuba, Dr. Roberto Morales Ojeda meeting the Minister of State for AYUSH (Independent Charge), Shri Shripad Yesso Naik, in New Delhi

Vice President of the Council of State of Cuba
- In office 21 July 2018 – 10 October 2019
- President: Miguel Díaz-Canel

Personal details
- Born: 15 June 1967 (age 59)

Roberto Tomás Morales Ojeda (born 15 June 1967) is a Cuban physician and politician who served as a Vice President of Cuba. He is a member of the Politburo of the Communist Party of Cuba (PCC) and, between 2010 and 2018, served in the Council of Ministers as Minister of Public Health. Currently, he is the secretary of organization of the Central Committee of the Communist Party of Cuba.

He has been described as the front runner to become the next president of Cuba.

== Early life ==
Born in the province of Cienfuegos, Morales Ojeda completed a degree in medicine in 1991, with a specialization in comprehensive and general medicine. He later completed a master's degree in public health.

He was elected to the National Assembly of People's Power in 2008. In 2014, he served as President of the sixty-seventh session of the WHO's World Health Assembly. On 19 April 2018, he was elected one of the six Vice-presidents of Cuba. The National Assembly officially approved his, as well as other Cabinet nominations, in a vote of confidence on 21 July 2018.
