= Democratic Federal Republican Party of Santiago de Cuba =

Political party in Cuba

The Democratic Federal Republican Party of Santiago de Cuba (Spanish: Partido Republicano Federal Democrático de Santiago de Cuba) was a political party in eastern Cuba.

The Organizing Committee of the party was founded on March 5, 1899. Members of the Organizing Committee included Dr. Joaquín Castillo Duany, Dr. Guillermo Fernández Mascaró, Luis Hechavarría, Emiliano Gómez, Lic. Aurelio Penabaz and Lino Dou Ayllón. The party supported the Enmienda Platt.

In 1900 the party merged into the Democratic Union Party, in opposition to the growing influence of the Cuban National Party.
