= 8th Council of State of Cuba =

The following is the 8th Council of State of the Republic of Cuba, which sat from 2013 to 2018.

== Members of the 8th Council of State (2013–2018) ==
| Position | Member |
|---|---|
| President of Cuba | Raúl Castro |
| First Vice President | Miguel Díaz-Canel Bermúdez |
| Vice President | Gladys María Bejerano Portela |
| Vice President | Mercedes López Acea |
| Vice President | José Ramón Machado Ventura |
| Vice President | Ramiro Valdés Menéndez |
| Vice President | Salvador Valdés Mesa |
| Secretary | Homero Acosta Álvarez |
| Refinery Manager at Sancti Spiritus | Lester Alain Alemán Hurtado |
| General Secretary of the Federation of Cuban Women | Teresa Amarelle Boué |
| Director of Pharmaceuticals in Camagüey | Yaramis Armenteros Medina |
| President of the Union of Writers and Artists | Miguel Barnet Lanza |
| President of the National Institute of Hydraulic Resources | Inés María Chapman Waugh |
| Minister of the Revolutionary Armed Forces | Army Corps General Leopoldo Cintra Frías |
| Principal Mechanical Industrial Company "September 2" of Matanzas | Ileana Amparo Flores Morales |
| Director of the National Wildlife | Guillermo García Frías |
| President of the National Association of Small Farmers | Rafael Ramón Santiesteban Pozo |
| President of the Provincial Assembly and the Government of Matanzas | Tania León Silveira |
| First Vice President of the Council of Ministers; Chief of the General Staff of the Revolutionary Armed Forces | Army Corps General Álvaro López Miera |
| Second Secretary of the Workers' Central Union of Cuba | Carmen Rosa López Rodríguez |
| Unknown | Martha del Carmen Mesa Valenciano |
| National Coordinator of the Committees for the Defense of the Revolution | Carlos Rafael Miranda Martínez |
| Rector of the University of Computer Sciences | Miriam Nicado García |
| Director of the Center for Medical Genetics of Pinar del Rio | Rosa Elena Simeón Negrín |
| Director of the Research Institute of Tropical Viandas | Sergio Rodríguez Morales |
| Vice President of the Council of Ministers | Marino Alberto Murillo Jorge |
| Minister of Foreign Affairs | Bruno Rodríguez Parrilla |
| Municipal Delegate Palmira, Cienfuegos | Lyz Belkis Rosabal Ponce |
| Vice President of the Council of Ministers; Minister of Economy and Planning | Adel Yzquierdo Rodríguez |
