= 1901 Cuban general election =

- 31 December 1901
- Presidential election
- Registered: 335,699
- Turnout: 63.48%
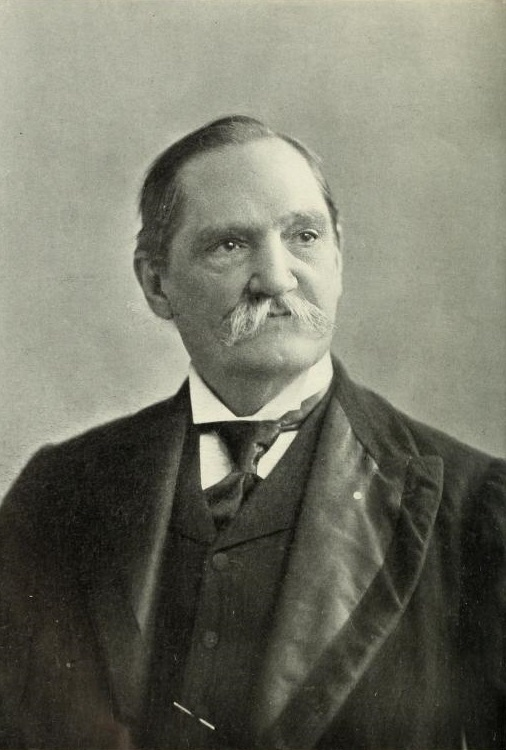
Nominee	Tomás Estrada Palma
Party	Independent
Popular vote	158,116
- Senate
Party	Seats
PNC	11
Republican	10
Independents	3
This lists parties that won seats. See the complete results below.
- House of Representatives
Party	Seats
PNC	27
Republican	18
Federal Republican	13
Others	1
Independents	4
This lists parties that won seats. See the complete results below.
President after
Tomás Estrada Palma; Independent

General elections were held in Cuba on 31 December 1901. Tomás Estrada Palma won the presidential election, and Luis Estévez y Romero was elected vice president. The Cuban National Party emerged as the largest party in the House of Representatives, winning 27 of the 63 seats. Voter turnout was 63.5%. Bartolomé Masó, the other presidential candidate, withdrew from the election citing irregularities, but still received 55,000 votes (null votes).

== Results ==
=== President ===
Candidate	Party	Votes	%
Tomás Estrada Palma	Independent	158,116	
Total			
Total votes		213,116	–
Registered voters/turnout		335,699	63.48
Source: Nohlen

=== Senate ===
Party	Seats
Cuban National Party	11
Republican Party of Havana	10
Independents	3
Total	24
Source: Nohlen

=== House of Representatives ===
Party	Seats
Cuban National Party	27
Republican Party of Havana	18
Federal Republican Party	13
Other	1
Independents	4
Total	63
Source: Nohlen
