= Salvador Valdés Mesa =

Vice President of Cuba since 2019

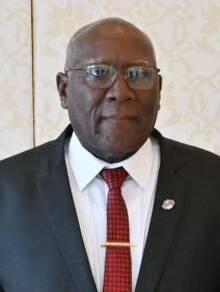
- Valdés Mesa in 2023

Vice President of Cuba
- Incumbent
- Assumed office 10 October 2019
- President: Miguel Díaz-Canel
- Preceded by: Rafael Guas Inclán (1959)

First Vice President of the Council of State
- In office 19 April 2018 – 10 October 2019
- President: Miguel Díaz-Canel
- Preceded by: Miguel Díaz-Canel
- Succeeded by: Post abolished

Vice President of the Council of State
- In office 24 February 2013 – 19 April 2018 Serving with Gladys María Bejerano Portela, Mercedes López Acea, José Ramón Machado Ventura and Ramiro Valdés
- President: Raúl Castro
- Preceded by: Esteban Lazo Hernández
- Succeeded by: Beatriz Jonson Urrutia

Minister of Labor and Social Security
- In office 2 March 1995 – 28 December 1999
- President: Fidel Castro
- Preceded by: Francisco Linares Calvo
- Succeeded by: Alfredo Morales Cartaya

Personal details
- Born: 13 June 1945 (age 81) Amancio, Cuba
- Party: 26th of July Movement (1961–1965); Communist Party of Cuba (1965–present)
- Spouse: Julia Piloto Saborit

Salvador Antonio Valdés Mesa (Spanish: [salβaˈðoɾ anˈtonjo βalˈdes ˈmesa]; born 13 June 1945) is a Cuban politician and former trade union leader. He has been the Vice President of Cuba since October 2019 and is a member of the Political Bureau of the Communist Party of Cuba. He was elected to succeed Miguel Díaz-Canel as First Vice President of the Council of State on 19 April 2018.

== Biography ==
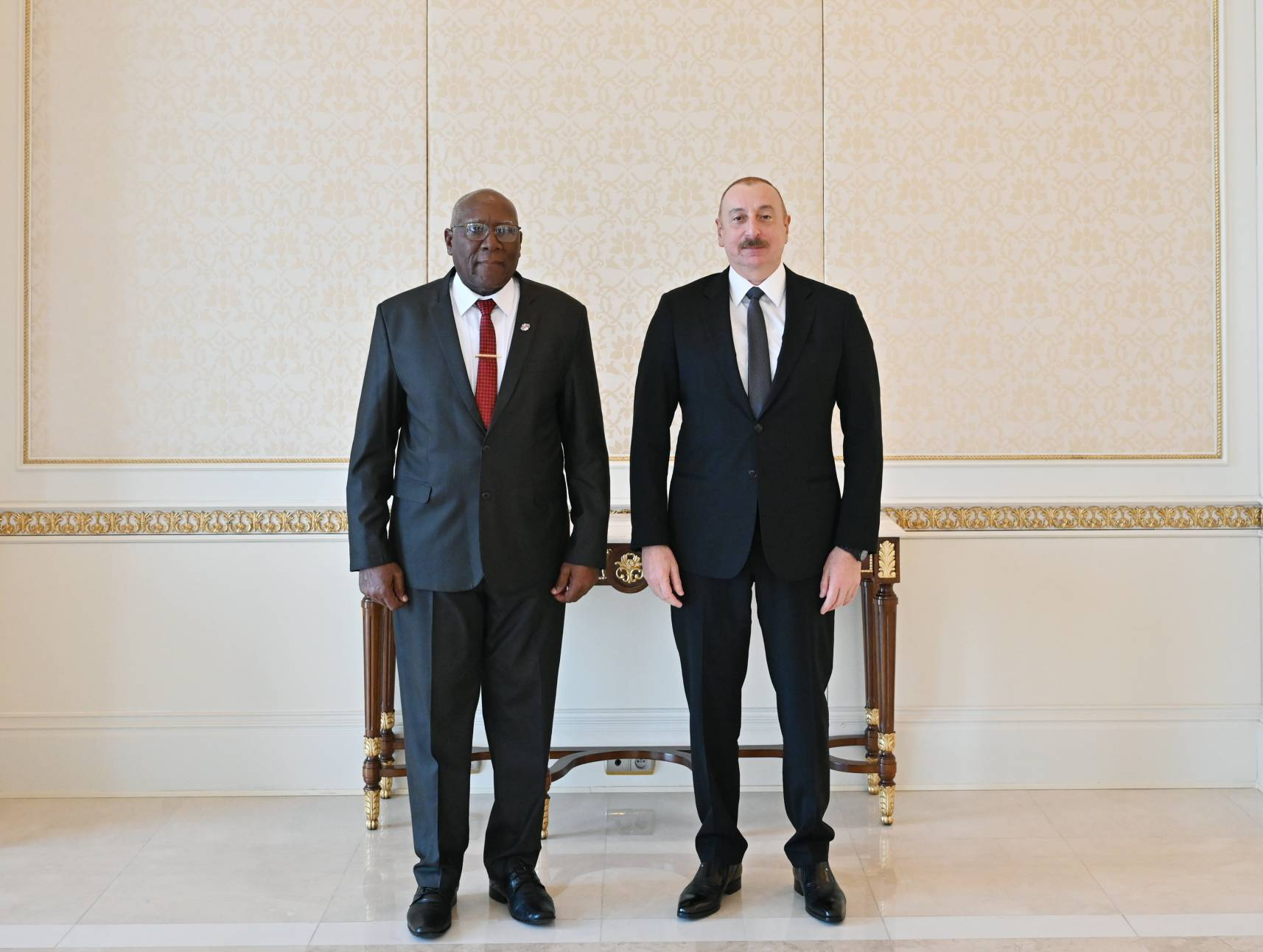
Salvador Valdés Mesa with Azerbaijani President Ilham Aliyev in Baku, 28 February 2023

Salvador Valdés was part of the Association of Young Rebels since 1961, after the triumph of the Cuban Revolution. He was a leader of the Workers' Central Union of Cuba and the Communist Party of Cuba. He served as Minister of Labor and Social Security between 1995 and 1999, when he was elected first secretary of the PCC in the province of Camagüey. He has been a deputy of the National Assembly of People's Power since 1993, he is a member of the Political Council of the Central Committee of the Communist Party of Cuba and a member of the Council of State (first for Santa Cruz del Sur, then Güines starting in the 9th legislature) where he holds one of the five Vice Presidencies.

== See also ==
- List of Afro-Latinos

Political offices
Preceded by Miguel Díaz-Canel	First Vice President of the Council of State; 2018-2019	2019 Cuban constitutional referendum
Preceded by Rafael Guas Inclán (until 1959)	Vice President of Cuba; 2019-present	Incumbent
