= Vice President of Cuba =

Vice President of the Republic of Cuba
- Vicepresidente de la República de Cuba (Spanish)
- Coat of arms of Cuba

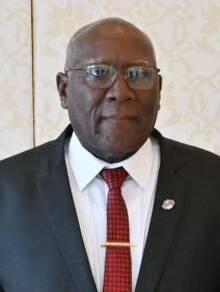
- Incumbent; Salvador Valdés Mesa since 19 April 2018
- Council of State
- Style: Mr Vice President (informal); His Excellency (diplomatic)
- Member of: Council of Ministers
- Residence: Palacio de la Revolución
- Appointer: National Assembly of People's Power
- Term length: Five years, renewable once
- Formation: 2 December 1976; 49 years ago
- First holder: Raúl Castro

The vice president of Cuba, previously the vice president of the Council of State between 1976 and 2019, is the second highest political position obtainable in the Council of State of Cuba. Currently there is a provision for several vice presidents, who are elected in the same manner as the president of Cuba.

Historically, the vice president of Cuba was elected in the same ticket with the president. The position has been in use 1902–1928, 1936, 1940–1958, and since 1976.

== List of officeholders ==
=== Vice presidents of the Republic in Arms (1869–1899) ===
No.	Portrait	Name (born-died)	Term of office			Political party	President(s)	Ref.
No.	Portrait	Name (born-died)	Took office	Left office	Time in office	Political party	President(s)	Ref.
1		Francisco Vicente Aguilera (1821–1877)	April 1869	22 February 1877 †	7 years, 10 months	Independent	Carlos Manuel de Céspedes Salvador Cisneros Betancourt Juan Bautista Spotorno Tomás Estrada Palma	
2		Francisco Javier de Céspedes (1821–1903)	April 1877	October 1877	6 months	Independent	Tomás Estrada Palma	
Vacant 1878 – 1895
3		Bartolomé Masó Márquez (1830–1907)	September 1895	September 1897	2 years	Cuban Revolutionary Party	Salvador Cisneros Betancourt	
4		Domingo Méndez Capote (1863–1934)	September 1897	May 1899	1 year, 8 months	Cuban Revolutionary Party	Bartolomé Masó Márquez	
Military Government of Cuba 1898 – 1902

=== Vice presidents of the Republic (1902–1959) ===
No.	Portrait	Name (born-died)	Term of office			Political party	President(s)	Ref.
No.	Portrait	Name (born-died)	Took office	Left office	Time in office	Political party	President(s)	Ref.
1		Luis Estévez y Romero (1849–1909)	May 1902	March 1905	2 years, 10 months	Cuban National Party	Tomás Estrada Palma	
1		Luis Estévez y Romero (1849–1909)	May 1902	March 1905	2 years, 10 months	Republican Party of Havana	Tomás Estrada Palma	
2		Domingo Méndez Capote (1863–1934)	January 1906	September 1906	8 months	Cuban National Party	Tomás Estrada Palma	
2		Domingo Méndez Capote (1863–1934)	January 1906	September 1906	8 months	Republican Party of Havana	Tomás Estrada Palma	
Provisional Government of Cuba 1906 – 1909
3		Alfredo Zayas y Alfonso (1861–1934)	January 1909	May 1913	4 years, 4 months	Liberal Party	José Miguel Gómez	
4		Enrique José Varona (1849–1933)	20 May 1913	20 May 1917	4 years	Conservative Party	Mario García Menocal	
5		Emilio Núñez (1855–1922)	20 May 1917	20 May 1921	4 years	Conservative Party	Mario García Menocal	
6		Francisco Carrillo Morales (1851–1926)	20 May 1921	20 May 1925	4 years	Popular Party	Alfredo Zayas y Alfonso	
7		Carlos de la Rosa Hernández (c. 1870–1933)	20 May 1925	1928	2–3 years	Liberal Party	Gerardo Machado	
Abolished 1929 – 1936
8		Federico Laredo Brú (1875–1946)	20 May 1936	December 1936	6 months	Liberal Party	Miguel Mariano Gómez	
Vacant 1936 – 1940
9		Gustavo Cuervo Rubio (1890–1978)	10 October 1940	10 October 1944	4 years	Popular Socialist Coalition	Fulgencio Batista	
10		Raúl de Cárdenas Echarte (1884–1979)	10 October 1944	10 October 1948	4 years	Authentic Party	Ramón Grau	
11		Guillermo Alonso Pujol (1899–1973)	10 October 1948	10 March 1952	3 years, 5 months	Authentic Party	Carlos Prío Socarrás	
Vacant 1952 – 1955
12		Rafael Guas Inclán (1896–1975)	24 February 1955	1 January 1959	3 years, 10 months	National Action Party	Fulgencio Batista	

=== First vice presidents of the Council of State (1976–2019) ===
No.	Portrait	Name (born-died)	Term of office			Political party	President(s)	Ref.
No.	Portrait	Name (born-died)	Took office	Left office	Time in office	Political party	President(s)	Ref.
1		Raúl Castro (born 1931)	December 1976	February 2008	31 years, 2 months	Communist Party	Fidel Castro	
2		José Ramón Machado Ventura (born 1930)	February 2008	February 2013	5 years	Communist Party	Raúl Castro	
3		Miguel Díaz-Canel (born 1960)	February 2013	April 2018	5 years, 2 months	Communist Party	Raúl Castro	
4		Salvador Valdés Mesa (born 1945)	April 2018	10 October 2019	1 year, 6 months	Communist Party	Miguel Díaz-Canel	

=== Vice President of the Republic of Cuba (2019–present) ===
No.	Portrait	Name (born-died)	Term of office			Political party	President(s)	Ref.
No.	Portrait	Name (born-died)	Took office	Left office	Time in office	Political party	President(s)	Ref.
1		Salvador Valdés Mesa (born 1945)	10 October 2019	Incumbent	7 years, 12 days	Communist Party	Miguel Díaz-Canel	

== See also ==
- Elections in Cuba
- President of Cuba
- List of current vice presidents
- Republic of Cuba (1902–1959)
- Republic of Cuba in Arms
