= Federal Republican Party =

Federal Republican Party may refer to:

- Federal Republican Party (Brazil)
- Federal Republican Party of Las Villas, Cuba
- Federal Democratic Republican Party of Spain
