= 1900 Cuban local elections =

Municipal elections were held in Cuba on June 16, 1900. The elections were held under the auspices of the U.S. Military Government with a system of restricted suffrage. Seven percent of the Cuban population took part in the polls, which saw some important victories for pro-independence sectors.

On July 1, 1900, municipal officials installed by the military governor were replaced with elected officials.

== Military Order No. 164 ==
Cuban local elections were initially intended to be held on May 1, 1900.

The elections for posts for municipal mayors, treasurers and judges were convened by the U.S. Military Government in Cuba, through the Military Order No. 164, issued on April 18, 1900. According to the Military Order, elections were to be held on June 16, 1900, and the elected officials would take office on July 1, 1900. The elected officials would hold office for one year.

Candidates for mayoral seats had to present themselves to the de facto mayors named by the Military Government, and provide a register of signatures of between 250 and 500 voters (depending on the size of the municipality) from the town in support of the candidature.

The Military Order also specified that Scrutinizing Centres (Juntas Escrutinadoras) would be formed across the island, with the task of appointing voters eligible to take part in the elections as well as to supervising the counting of votes.

== Electorate ==
Out of a population of 1,572,797, a total of 150,648 were given voting rights. 110,816 of those eligible took part in the elections. Voting was completely restricted to males. Furthermore, the voter had to be Cuban-born, the son of Cuban-born whilst their parents were temporarily abroad, or a former Spaniard who had renounced his citizenship. The minimum age for eligible voters was 20. They had to be resident in the municipality where they intended to vote for at least thirty days ahead of registration on the electoral roll, as well as being free of felony convictions. Moreover, they had to be literate and own property worth at least US$250. However, the U.S. military governor, Leonard Wood, was wary of the risk of dissent from Cuban ex-army men, and the literacy requirement was waived for soldiers and ex-soldiers. The property prerequisite was also waived for soldiers of the Liberation Army.

By not adopting universal suffrage, the U.S. administration hoped to secure a victory for pro-American conservative forces. The decision to implement limited suffrage had been taken in Washington months before the polls. In the American political debate, it was often argued that the Cuban masses were illiterate and unsuited to have a say in politics. General James H. Wilson rebuffed Cuban demands for universal suffrage as 'rot'. Furthermore, he stated that "[s]uffrage, like any other privilege of citizenship, should be based upon qualifications and its exercise not permitted merely because one happens to belong to the male species." The U.S. Secretary of War Elihu Root thought that limited suffrage would be useful to ensure that Cuba would not fall into "perpetual revolutions" and instead would provide a stable conservative leadership for "control of Cubans by Cubans".

== Campaigning ==
The electoral process was marred by irregularities. In the province of Las Villas, there was a campaign of violent intimidation carried out by the party of the provincial governor José Miguel Gómez, the Federal Republican Party of Las Villas. The campaign successfully forced all potential competitors away from the polls, and the party won the election in the province by default.

During the entire first half of 1900, Military Governor Wood himself worked behind the scenes for the sake of supporting pro-American conservative sectors, trying to cobble together viable conservative electoral coalitions.

== Results ==
In many parts of the islands the elections were a success for the independentista Cuban National Party, much to the dismay of the U.S. administration. In Havana, the Cuban National Party candidate Alejandro Rodríguez won with 12,027 votes. The electoral victories of the independentista sector emboldened pro-independence Cubans to exert more pressure on the Americans, for example through raising demands for speedy implementation of the Joint Resolution.

In Santiago de Cuba, the Republican candidate Tomás Padró Griñán was elected. In Matanzas, the elections were won by Republicans.

The manning of polling stations and counting of votes were done by Cubans, and U.S. soldiers were not present at the polling stations. However, after the elections the elected mayor had to swear an oath of allegiance to the U.S. Military Government before taking office.

== Aftermath ==
After the holding of the municipal polls, the military government issued another military order on July 25, 1900, convening elections to a Constituent Assembly.

Less than a year later, on June 1, 1901, fresh local elections were held.
