= Soravilla =

Soravilla is a surname. Notable people with the surname include:

- Lesbia Soravilla (1906–1989), Cuban writer, feminist and activist
- Sabrina Soravilla (born 1996), Uruguayan footballer
