= 2024 Moscow Victory Day Parade =

Russian military parade

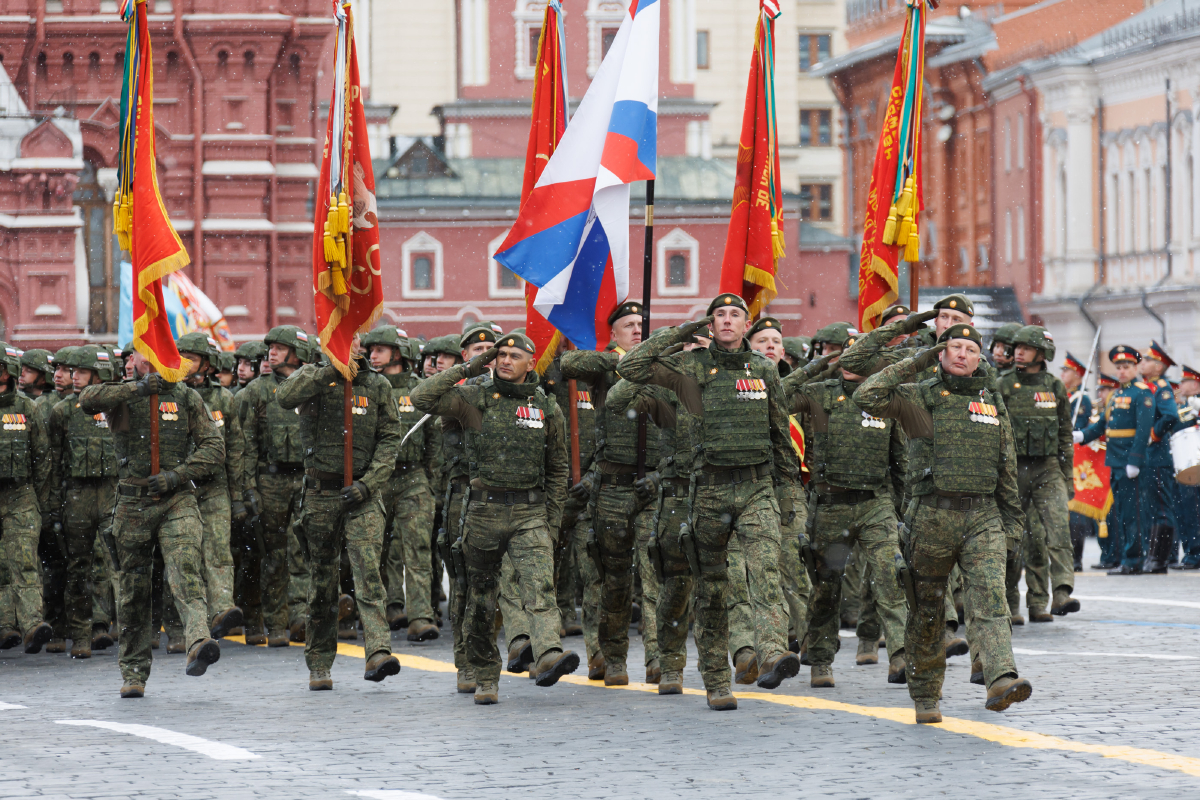
Russian army units in the parade.

The 2024 Moscow Victory Day Parade was a military parade held in Red Square, Moscow, Russia, on 9 May 2024, to commemorate the 79th anniversary of Victory Day, which celebrates the defeat of Nazi Germany and the end of the Eastern Front of World War II. It occurred two days after Vladimir Putin's fifth inauguration as President of Russia.

== Background ==
Victory Day is a significant secular holiday in Russia that commemorates Germany's surrender in World War II, which marked the end of one of the deadliest conflicts in human history. The holiday celebrates the military might and moral fortitude of the Red Army, which suffered enormous losses in the war, with at least 26 million Soviet citizens losing their lives. Victory Day has been observed annually on 9 May since 1945, and it is one of the most revered and widely celebrated public holidays in Russia, with parades, fireworks, and concerts held across the country.

== Parade summary ==
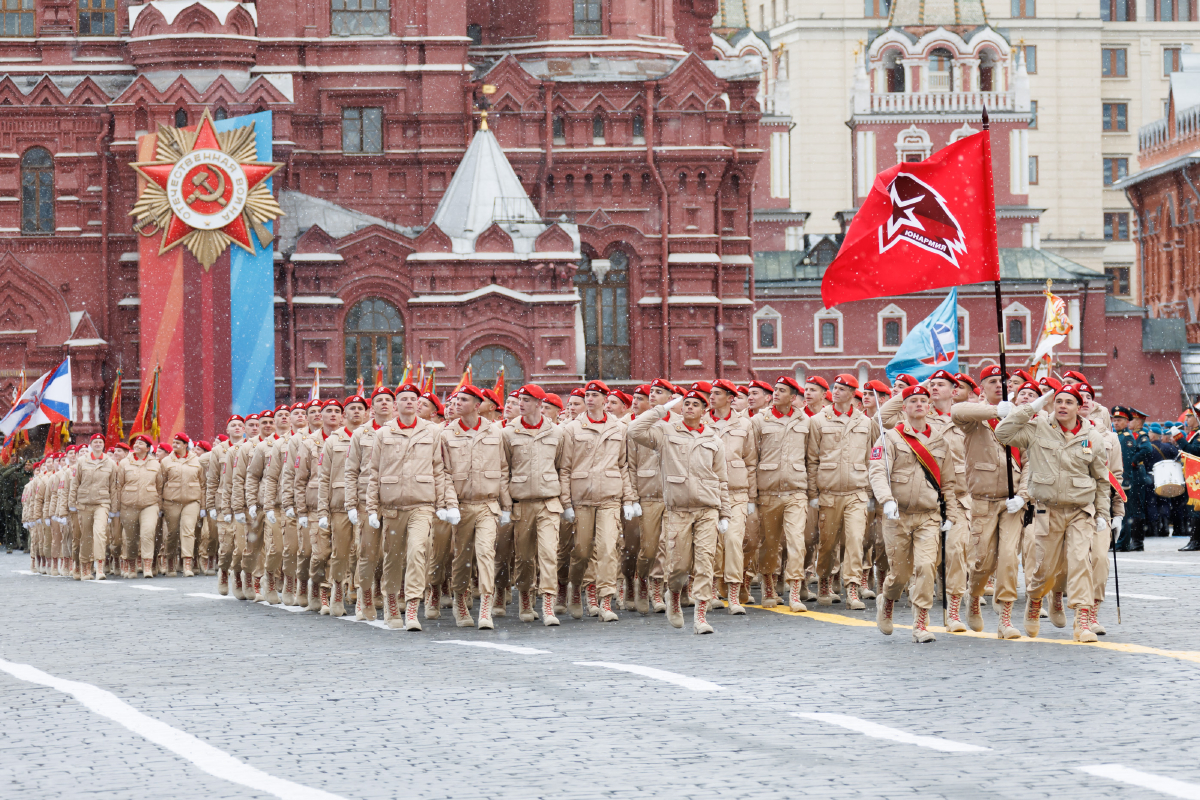
Young Army Cadets National Movement on the Red Square

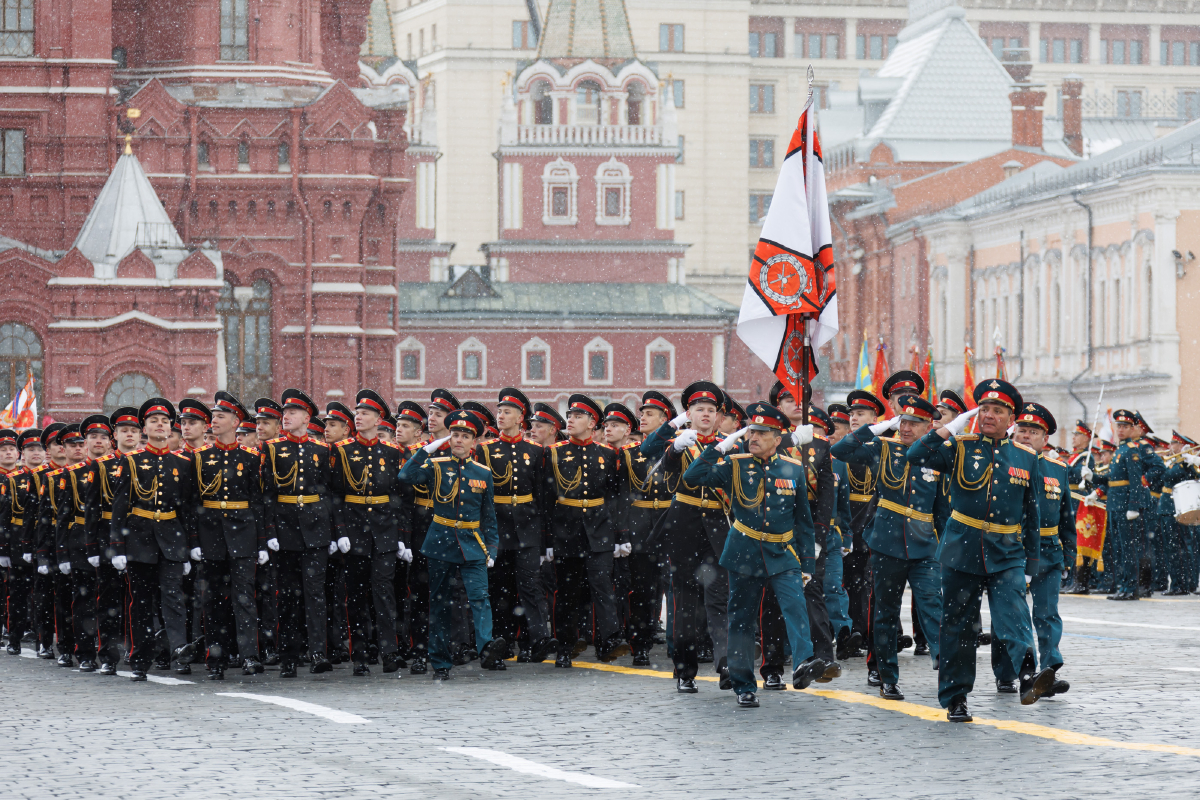
Military parade on the Red Square

As light flurries of snow fell on Red Square, over 9,000 different troops from 30 various ceremonial regiments marched past the parade stand. Just like the previous Victory Day parade, the mechanized column section only featured one tank, a T-34-85, but for the first time in three years, aerial units took part in the parade: the Russian Knights aerobatic team flew Su-30 and MiG-29 fighters, followed by six Su-25 jets that emitted smoke in the Russian tricolour. As in prior parades, missile launchers, artillery, and ICBMs were shown. During the parade, Russian soldiers were equipped with what appeared to be drone jammers given the fear that there would be Ukrainian attacks during the ceremonies. For the first time since the 2015 Moscow Victory Day Parade, a president from an African nation was invited to the parade, as Umaro Sissoco Embaló of Guinea-Bissau was in attendance. It was the last Victory Day parade for Sergei Shoigu performing the duties of Minister of Defence, as three days after the parade, he was not reappointed to the position.

== Putin's speech ==
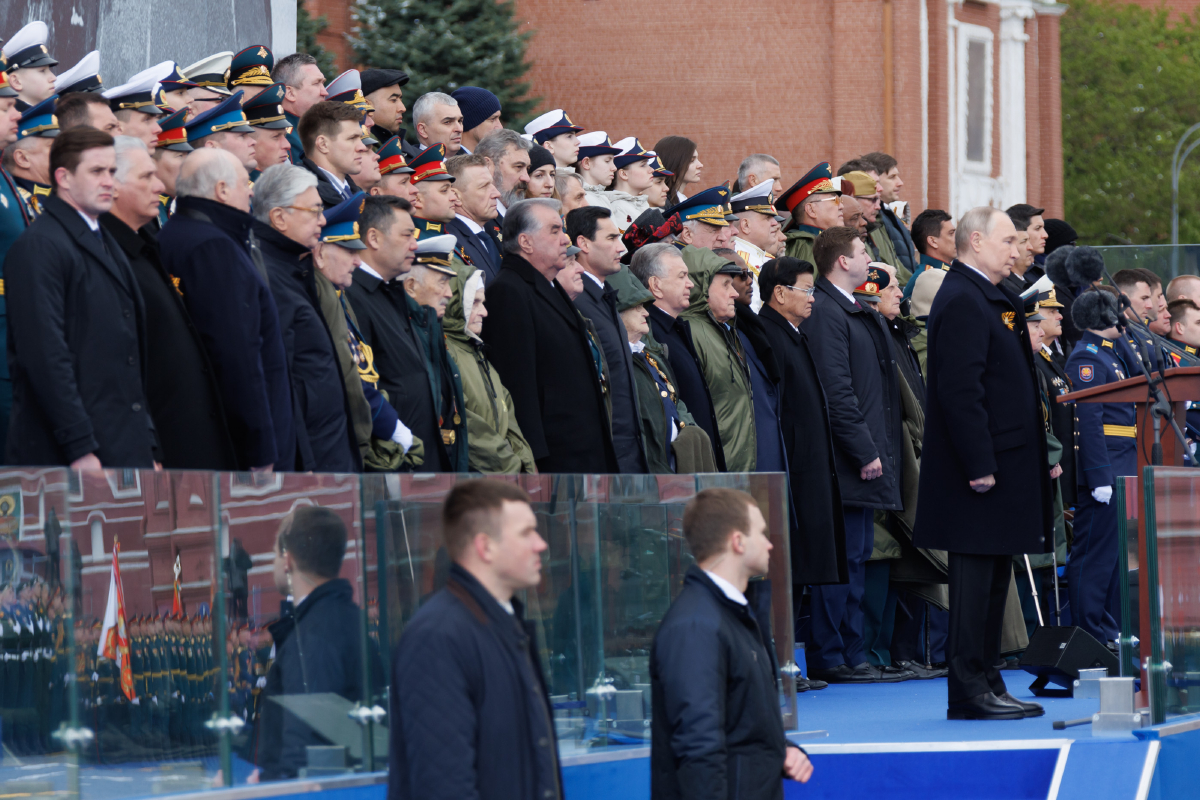
Putin speaks from the podium

Putin criticized former Eastern Bloc Soviet satellite states, as well as several other countries formerly occupied by the Soviet Union for the removal of Soviet-era monuments and memorials dedicated to the Soviet Union's victory in World War II, saying that they were now dedicating monuments to "traitors and Hitler's accomplices" while erasing the history of noble world liberators. He also claimed that the West attempted to forget major battles during the war, and said that Russia was trying its best to avoid a global conflict, but would also not let the nation be threatened.

== Similar commemorations in Ukraine ==
Ukraine had marked the celebrations one day before the parade in Moscow, Since Ukraine celebrated Day of Remembrance and Victory over Nazism in World War II 1939 – 1945 on 8 May. A small ceremony was held outside the National Museum of the History of Ukraine in the Second World War in Kyiv, where president Volodymyr Zelenskyy awarded the household members of fallen Ukrainian soldiers with the Hero of Ukraine medal and Ukrainian soldiers with Cross of Military Merit medal. During Zelenskyy's official address, he talked about war crimes committed by Russia during the Russian invasion of Ukraine. He had compared Putin to Hitler, the Kremlin to the Reichstag building, the Young Army Cadets National Movement to the Hitler Youth and the Z symbol to the swastika.

== Foreign dignitaries in attendance ==
Amongst those in attendance were:

- President of Belarus Alexander Lukashenko
- President of Cuba and First Secretary of the Communist Party Miguel Díaz-Canel
- President of Guinea-Bissau Umaro Sissoco Embaló
- President of Kazakhstan Kassym-Jomart Tokayev
- President of Kyrgyzstan Sadyr Japarov
- President of Laos and General Secretary of the Revolutionary Party Thongloun Sisoulith
- President of Tajikistan Emomali Rahmon
- President of Turkmenistan Serdar Berdimuhamedow
- President of Uzbekistan Shavkat Mirziyoyev

== Music ==
Music was performed by the massed bands of the Moscow Garrison.

Inspection of Troops

- The Sacred War (“священная война”)
- Jubilee Slow March "25 Years of the Red Army" (Юбилейный встречный марш "25 лет РККА")
- March of the Life-Guard Preobrazhensky Regiment ("Марш Лейб-гвардии Преображенского полка")
- Slow March of Military Schools ("Встречный марш военных училищ")
- Slow March for Carrying Out the Combat Banner ("Встречный Марш для выноса Боевого Знамени")
- Guards Slow March of the Navy (Гвардейский Встречный Марш Военно-Морского Флота")
- Slow March (E. Aksenov) (Встречный марш Е. Аксенов)
- Slav’sya ("Славься")
- Moscow Parade Fanfare (“Московская Парадная Фанфара”)

Speech by President of the Russian Federation, Vladimir Putin

- State Anthem of the Russian Federation ("Государственный гимн Российской Федерации")
- Signal Retreat (“Сигнал Отбой”)

Infantry Column

- Drum and Fife based on the theme from the March "General Miloradovich" ("Тема из Марша Генерал Милорадович")
- Metropolitan March (“Марш "Столичный”)
- March-Song "Moscow in May" ("Марш-песня Москва майская”)
- March of the Nakhimov Naval Cadets (“марш нахимовцев”)
- Sports March ("Спортивный Марш")
- Drill March ("Строевой Марш")
- March "In Defense of the Motherland" ("Марш В защиту Родины")
- March Arrangement of “Katyusha” ("Катюша”)
- Aviators March “Aviamarch” (“Авиaмарш”) (Without introduction)
- March of the Cosmonauts (“Марш Космонавтов”) Arrangement on the song "I believe, friends" (“Я верю, друзья”)
- March "The Sea is Calling" (Марш "Море зовёт")
- March of the Artillerymen (“Марш артиллеристов”)
- March Arrangement of “We Need Only Victory” (“Нам нужна одна Победа”)
- March "Leningrad" ("Марш Ленинград")
- March "Parade" (Марш "Парад")
- March Arrangement of "Song of the Perturbed Youth" ("Песня о тревожной молодости")
- March “To Serve Russia” (Марш "Служить России”)
- March Arrangement of "Cossacks in Berlin" (Марш "Казаки в Берлине")
- March-Song “Let’s Go” (“В путь”)
- Drum and Fife based on the theme from the March "General Miloradovich" ("Тема из Марша Генерал Милорадович")

Mobile and Air Column

- March "Triumph of Winners" (Марш "Триумф победителей")
- March “Hero” (“Марш Герой”)
- March Arrangement of “Long Live our State” ("Да здравствует наша держава")
- Aviators March “Aviamarch” (“Авиaмарш”)

Conclusion of the Parade

- March "Victory Day" (Марш "День Победы")
- March-Song "Native Country" (Марш-песня "Родная страна")
- March “Farewell of Slavianka” (“Прощание Славянки”)

Ceremony at the Tomb of the Unknown Soldier

- "Eternal Flame" ("Вечный огонь)
- "Adagio" ("Адажио")
- State Anthem of the Russian Federation ("Государственный гимн Российской Федерации")
- March "Legendary Sevastopol" (Марш "Легендарный Севастополь")
- March "Ballad of a Soldier" (Марш "Баллада о Солдате")

== See also ==
- 1945 Moscow Victory Parade
- Victory Day (9 May)
- Victory in Europe Day
- Victory Day Parades
