= Berta Arocena de Martínez Márquez =

Cuban journalist, suffragist and feminist

- Born: 1899; Havana, Cuba
- Died: 1956 (aged 56–57)
- Occupation: Journalist

Berta Arocena de Martínez Márquez (1899–1956) was a Cuban journalist, suffragist and feminist active during the 1920s and 1930s.

== Biography ==
Berta Arocena was born in 1899, in Havana to an old propertied family. She dabbled in writing from an early age, writing in journals and newspapers. She married the journalist Guillermo Martínez Márquez 1926, with whom she had two children, Bertha (born 1934) and William (born 1941).

Along with Renée Méndez Capote, Arocena cofounded the Lyceum, on 1 December 1928, one of the most intellectual and cultural feminist organizations of its time, serving as its president. She also joined Carmen Castellanos, Matilde Martínez Márquez, Carmelina Guanche, Alicia Santamaría, Ofelia Tomé, Dulce Marta Castellanos, Lilliam Mederos, Rebeca Gutiérrez, Sarah Méndez Capote, Mary Caballero, María Josefa Vidaurreta and María Teresa Moré in organizing a group that advocated for women's suffrage. She became a lobbyist in Cuba's parliament and organized various feminist events in that country. She also participated in the founding of Club Femenino de Cuba and the National Union of Women, along with several other writers such as Ofelia Rodríguez Acosta, Lesbia Soravilla, Julieta Carreta and the actor and activist Teté Casuso.
