= Council of State (Cuba) =

Permanent organ

The Council of State (Spanish: Consejo de Estado) of Cuba is the permanent organ of the National Assembly of People's Power. It has the authority to exercise most legislative power between sessions of the National Assembly of People's Power, subject to its approval, and to call the National Assembly of People's Power into session between its scheduled twice yearly sessions.

The National Assembly is only in session for a few days each year. Members of the Council of State, which serve in the National Assembly, do not reflect popular outcomes in the elections. According to a 2021 study, under competitive elections, most members of the Council of State might have been defeated.

The membership consists of a President, a Secretary, a First Vice President, five Vice Presidents, and 27 additional members. The President, the Secretary, the First Vice President, and the five Vice Presidents are also members of the Council of Ministers. With the passage of the 2019 Cuban Constitution, the post of President of the Council of State will be to the President of the National Assembly, while the functions of the head of state will be transferred from the Council of State to the restored office of President of the Republic.

== 9th Council of State (2018–2019) ==
Rank	Name	Birth	Office	Portrait	PCC membership
1	Miguel Díaz-Canel	1960	President, Council of State		PB
2	Salvador Valdés Mesa	1945	First Vice President, Council of State	—	PB
3	Ramiro Valdés Menéndez	1932	Vice President, Council of State	—	PB
4	Roberto Tomás Morales Ojeda	1967	Vice President, Council of State	—	PB
5	Gladys María Bejerano Portela	1947	Vice President, Council of State	—	—
6	Inés María Chapman Waugh	1965	Vice President, Council of State	—	—
7	Beatriz Johnson Urrutia	1969	Vice President, Council of State	—	—
8	Homero Acosta Álvarez	1964	Secretary, Council of State	—	—
9	Leopoldo Cintra Frías	1928	—	—	PB
10	Teresa Maria Amarelle Boué	1963	—	—	PB
11	Ulises Guilarte de Nacimiento	1964	—	—	PB
12	Miriam Nicado García	1959	—	—	PB
13	Guillermo García Frías	1928	—	—	—
14	Bruno Rodríguez Parrilla	1958	—	—	—
15	Martha del Carmen Mesa Valenciana	1960	—	—	—
16	Carlos Rafael Miranda Martínez	1964	—	—	—
17	Susely Morfa González	1982	—	—	—
18	Rafael Antonio Santiesteban	1969	—	—	—
19	Miguel Ángel Barnet Lanza	1928	—	—	—
20	Ileana Amparo Flores Morales	1966	—	—	—
21	Raúl Alejandro Palmero Fernández	1995	—	—	—
22	Jorge Amador Berlanga Acosta	1962	—	—	—
23	Yipsi Moreno	1980	—	—	—
24	Elizabeth Peña	1964	—	—	—
25	Yoerky Sánchez Cuéllar	1983	—	—	—
26	Ivis Niuba Villa Millán	1973	—	—	—
27	Bárbara Alexis Terry Depestre	1972	—	—	—
28	Reyna Salermo Escalona	1965	—	—	—
29	Rosalina Fournier Frómeta	1965	—	—	—
30	Carlos Alberto Martínez Blanco	1969	—	—	—
31	Felicia Martínez Suárez	1963	—	—	—

== See also ==
- List of prime ministers of Cuba
- Council of Ministers
- List of presidents of Cuba
- Similar institutions:
  - Standing Committee of the National People's Congress of China
  - Standing Committee of the Supreme People's Assembly of North Korea
- 8th Council of State of Cuba
