= Renée Méndez Capote =

Cuban author and activist

- Born: Renée Méndez-Capote y Chaple; 12 November 1901; Havana, Cuba
- Died: 14 May 1989 (aged 87); Cuba
- Occupations: Writer, essayist, journalist, translator, feminist activist
- Spouse: Manolo Solís
- Writing career
- Pen name: Chaple, Io-san, Berenguela, Suzanne
- Language: Spanish
- Years active: 1917–1989
- Genres: Essay, narrative, short story, children's literature, biography
- Notable work: Memorias de una cubanita que nació con el siglo (1969)
- Movement: Feminism

Renée Méndez Capote y Chaple (12 November 1901 – 14 May 1989), also known by the pseudonyms Io-san, Berenguela, and Suzanne, was a Cuban writer, essayist, journalist, translator, suffragist, and feminist activist. She worked in children's literature, short stories, essays, and biographies.

== Life and work ==
The daughter of Domingo Méndez Capote and María Chaple y Suárez, she made her publishing debut in April 1917 with an article titled "El primer baile" (The first dance) for the alumni newsletter of La Salle College.

Her works include Memorias de una cubanita que nació con el siglo (Memories of a Cuban girl who was born with the century), considered a classic of testimonial literature. In the journalistic field, she contributed to several of her country's publications, such as Diario de la Marina, La Gaceta de Cuba, Revolución y Cultura, Unión y Juventud Rebelde, as well as the magazines Bohemia, Social y Mujeres and the weekly newspaper Pionero.

In September 1934, Méndez Capote was a survivor of the last voyage of the American luxury cruise liner Morro Castle. She was one of the few passengers to escape the expensive A-Deck staterooms alive as well as one of the few woman passengers to be rescued by one of the ship's own lifeboats (most other passengers survived by jumping off the ship).

== Activism ==
Together with Berta Arocena de Martínez Márquez, she was one of the founders of the Lyceum on 1 December 1928, one of the "most cultural and intellectual" feminist organizations of the era. They were joined by Carmen Castellanos, Matilde Martínez Márquez, Carmelina Guanche, Alicia Santamaría, Ofelia Tomé, Dulce Marta Castellanos, Lilliam Mederos, Rebeca Gutiérrez, Sarah Méndez Capote, Mary Caballero, María Josefa Vidaurreta, and María Teresa Moré in organizing a group which advocated for women's suffrage. This became a lobbyist institution in Cuba's parliament and organized several feminist events in the country.

== Works ==
=== Essays ===
- Oratoria cubana (1926)
- Lento desarrollo de la Cuba colonial (1978)

=== Biographies ===
- Domingo Méndez Capote. El hombre civil del 95 (1957)
- Memorias de una cubanita que nació con el siglo (1963)
- Ché: comandante del alba (1977)
- El niño que sentía crecer la hierba (1981)

=== Reports ===
- Apuntes (1927)
- Relatos heroicos, 241 pp (1965) (Crónicas de viaje, 1966)
- De la maravillosa historia de nuestra tierras (1967)
- Episodios de la epopeya(1968)
- 4 conspiraciones (1972)
- Un héroe de once años (1975)
- El tráfico infame (1977)
- Hace muchos años una joven viajera (1983)
- A Varadero en carreta (1984)
- El remolino y otros relatos (1982)

=== Others ===
- "Dos niños en la Cuba colonial" (short story, 1966)
- "Fortalezas en la Habana colonial" (release, 1974)
- "Costumbres de antaño" (1975)
- "Por el ojo de la cerradura" (testimonial, 1977)
- "Cuentos de ayer" (1978)
- "Amables figuras del pasado" (1981)
- "Recuerdos de la vieja biblioteca" (article, 1981)
