= Lyceum and Lawn Tennis Club =

Lyceum and Lawn Tennis Club (Spanish: Liceo y Club de Tenis sobre Césped) was a Cuban women's cultural, social, and physical fitness organization. Founded in 1929 in Havana, its first president was the journalist, suffragist and feminist, Berta Arocena de Martínez Márquez. The society established Cuba's first free public library, first children's library, and first course of instruction for librarians.

== Early history ==
Modeled after similar Spanish women's social organizations, the Lyceum was founded in Havana by Berta Arocena, Carmen Castellanos, Dulce María Castellanos, Carmelina Guanche, Rebeca Gutiérrez, Matilde Martínez Márquez, Lillian Mederos, Reneé Méndez Capote, Sarah Méndez Capote, María Teresa Moré, Alicia Santamaría, Ofelia Tomé, and María Josefa Vidaurreta in 1929. Arocena served as the first president. Similar liberal and cultural societies of the period included the Union Club and the Vedado Tennis Club, which likewise predominantly consisted of Cuban members.

== Merger ==
In 1939, Lyceum merged with "Tennis de Señoritas" and was renamed the Lyceum and Lawn Tennis Club. The organization's concentration included "education, public service, art, music, and democratic organization". It published a monthly magazine, Revista Lyceum, of which Mirta Aguirre served as assistant editor-in-chief. University of Havana professor Piedad Maza served as the magazine's editor-in-chief from 1949 until its final issue in 1955. The Lyceum founded the country's first free public library and Cuba's first children's library, as well as offering the first librarian training class. The Lyceum also hosted notable art events in its exhibition hall, such as those of Pablo Picasso (in 1942) and Lourdes Gomez Franca (1957, 1960).

== Dissolution and legacy ==
The government of Fidel Castro disbanded the society in 1968 and many of its members were exiled to other countries. The Cuban Women's Club (1968-), formed in Miami, Florida, US, is modeled after the Lyceum and Lawn Tennis Club.
