= Sarah Méndez Capote =

Cuban writer and feminist activist

- Born: Sarah Méndez-Capote y Chaple
- Occupations: Writer, poet, translator, feminist activist
- Writing career
- Language: Spanish
- Literary movement: Feminism

Sarah Méndez-Capote y Chaple was a Cuban writer, poet, translator, suffragist, and feminist activist. She was the sister of writer Renée Méndez Capote.

== Life and work ==
The daughter of Domingo Méndez Capote and María Chaple y Suárez, she published some of her poetic work in Revista de la Habana in the early 1930s. She also contributed to the avant-garde journal Social and to El Fígaro.

As a women's rights activist, she was one of the founders of the Lyceum on 1 December 1928, one of the "most cultural and intellectual" feminist organizations of the era, formed by her sister Renée, Berta Arocena de Martínez Márquez, Carmen Castellanos, Matilde Martínez Márquez, Carmelina Guanche, Alicia Santamaría, Ofelia Tomé, Dulce Marta Castellanos, Lilliam Mederos, Rebeca Gutiérrez, Mary Caballero, María Josefa Vidaurreta, and María Teresa Moré. The group advocated for women's suffrage. It became a lobbyist institution in Cuba's parliament and organized several feminist events in the country.
