= 1900 Cuban Constitutional Assembly election =

Constitutional Assembly elections were held in Cuba on 15 September 1900. The result was a victory for the Republican–Democratic Coalition (an alliance of the Republican Party and Democratic Union Party), which won 18 of the 31 seats.

== Results ==
Party	Votes	%	Seats
Republican–Democratic Coalition			18
Cuban National Party			9
Concentración Patriótica (PNC–Oriente)			4
Total			31
Total votes	131,627	–	
Registered voters/turnout	175,501	75.00	
Source: Nohlen
