= Legendary Sevastopol =

Official anthem of Sevastopol

Легендарный Севастополь
English: Legendary Sevastopol
- Great Sevastopol
- Municipal anthem of Sevastopol
- Lyrics: Pyotr Gradov; Myroslav Mamchak
- Music: Vano Muradeli, 1954
- Adopted: 29 April 1994

Legendary Sevastopol (Russian: Легендарный Севастополь) or Great Sevastopol (Ukrainian: Величавий Севастополь) is the municipal anthem of Sevastopol. Approved by the decision of the I session of the City Council of the XXII convocation dated July 29, 1994. It was composed by Vano Muradeli, with lyrics created by Pyotr Gradov.

== History ==
Georgian composer Vano Muradeli undertook to write the anthem at the request of Vice Admiral Nikolai Kulakov, at that time a member of the military council of the Black Sea Fleet. For poetry, Muradeli turned to the poet Alexander Zharov. Poems were written, but Muradeli considered them unsuitable and turned to the poet Pyotr Gradov, whose poems formed the basis of the anthem.

For the first time, the song was officially performed in the House of Fleet Officers by the Song and Dance Ensemble of the Black Sea Fleet on the eve of the Day of the Soviet Navy for representatives of the command, the Political Directorate, the Military Council of the Fleet, military units, ships, city party bodies, deputies of the City Council.

=== Ukrainian lanaguage version ===
The song "Great Sevastopol" (Ukrainian: Величавий Севастополь) was written by Myroslav Mamchak in 2000 as a Ukrainian-language version of the Sevastopol Anthem in Russian. According to an interview in the newspaper Sevastopolskaya Gazeta, it was the idea of Oleksandr Ivanov, an employee of the TV and Radio Center of the Ukrainian Navy, to perform the song in Ukrainian. In the chorus, the words "pride of Russian sailors" were changed to "the capital of Ukrainian sailors." It was performed for the first time in 2001 by Oleksandr Ivanov.

After the annexation of Crimea to Russia, the deputies of the Legislative Assembly of Sevastopol in 2015 banned the performance of the anthem in Ukrainian.

=== Other performances ===
Starting with the 2015 Moscow Victory Day Parade, the march has been performed on Red Square in honor of Victory Day.

== Lyrics ==
Russian lyrics by Petro Gradov	English translation	Ukrainian lyrics by Myroslav Mamchak	English translation
Ты лети, крылатый ветер, Над морями, над землей, Расскажи ты всем на свете, Про любимый город мой. Всем на свете ты поведай, Как на крымских берегах, Воевали наши деды, И прославили в боях. Легендарный Севастополь, Неприступный для врагов. Севастополь, Севастополь — Гордость русских моряков! Здесь мы в бой, святой и правый, Шли за Родину свою, И твою былую славу, Мы умножили в бою. Скинув черные бушлаты, Черноморцы в дни войны, Здесь на танки шли с гранатой, Шли на смерть твои сыны Легендарный Севастополь, Неприступный для врагов. Севастополь, Севастополь — Гордость русских моряков! Если из-за океана, К нам враги придут с мечом, Встретим мы гостей незваных, Истребительным огнем. Знает вся страна родная, Что не дремлют корабли, И надежно охраняет, Берега родной земли. Легендарный Севастополь, Неприступный для врагов. Севастополь, Севастополь — Гордость русских моряков!	You fly, winged wind, Over the seas, over the earth, Tell everyone in the world About my favorite city. Tell everyone in the world As on the Crimean shores Our grandfathers fought And glorified in battles Legendary Sevastopol, Inaccessible to enemies. Sevastopol, Sevastopol The pride of Russian sailors! Here to fight, holy and right, Walked for their homeland And your former glory We have multiplied in battle. Throwing off the black jackets, Black Sea Fleet sailors during the war Here they went to the tanks with a grenade, Your sons were going to die. Legendary Sevastopol, Inaccessible to enemies. Sevastopol, Sevastopol The pride of Russian sailors! If from across the ocean Enemies will come to us with a sword, We will meet uninvited guests Exterminating fire. The whole country knows, That the ships do not sleep And securely guarded Shores of native land. Legendary Sevastopol, Inaccessible to enemies. Sevastopol, Sevastopol The pride of Russian sailors!	Хай летить велична слава Про звитягу моряків Севастопольських героїв — Всіх його захисників. Всі у світі хай узнають, Як ескадри кораблів I матроси за Вітчизну Йшли у бій на ворогів. Величавий Севастополь, Місто слави й кораблів: Білокам'яна столиця Українських моряків. Тут хрестились древні руси — Володимира сини, I святую ратну славу В стольний Київ принесли. Тут не раз у бій кривавий Йшли на подвиг козаки, Бились на смерть в бастіонах українці-моряки. Величавий Севастополь, Місто слави й кораблів: Білокам'яна столиця Українських моряків. В бойовім строю змінили Ветеранів їх сини, I в серцях їх пломеніє Героїзм Сапун-гори. То ж якщо на нас нападуть, Як колись у дні війни, Знову в бій готові встати Українські моряки. Величавий Севастополь, Місто слави й кораблів: Білокам'яна столиця Українських моряків.	Let the majestic glory fly About the victory of sailors Heroes of Sevastopol — All his defenders. Let everyone in the world know Like squadrons of ships I sailors for the Fatherland They went into battle against the enemies. Great Sevastopol, City of Glory and Ships: White stone capital Ukrainian sailors. The ancient Russians were baptized here — Sons of Volodymyr I celebrate military glory They brought it to capital Kyiv. Here more than once the battle is bloody The Cossacks went on a campaign, They fought to the death in the bastions Ukrainian sailors. Great Sevastopol, City of Glory and Ships: White stone capital Ukrainian sailors. They changed the battle formation Veterans are their sons, And their hearts are burning Heroism of Sapun Mountain. So if we are attacked, As once in the days of war, They are ready to fight again Ukrainian sailors. Great Sevastopol, City of Glory and Ships: White stone capital Ukrainian sailors.

== Literature ==
- Мурадели В. И.; А. Тищенко (1978). Песни. Для голоса (хора) в сопровождении фортепиано (баяна). Vol. 1 (11930 экз ed.). М.: Советский композитор.
