= Republican Party of Havana =

Republican Party of Havana Partido Republicano de La Habana
- Leaders: Domingo Méndez Capote
- Founded: 1899
- Dissolved: 1906
- Headquarters: Havana
- Ideology: Republicanism; Conservatism; Decentralization
- Political position: Right-wing

The Republican Party of Havana (Spanish: Partido Republicano de La Habana) was a political party in Cuba. The party was founded in the end of 1899. It was led by Dr. Domingo Méndez Capote. Prominent party members included Mario García Menocal, Eugenio Sánchez Agramonte, Fernando Freyre de Andrade, Manuel María Coronado, Manuel Despaigne and Juan Gualberto Gómez.

== Overview ==
The party announced its program on April 3, 1900. The party declared its willingness to help the U.S. occupation government during the transitory phase of military occupation, in line with the Joint Resolution of April 19, 1898. Furthermore, the program stated its goal of the formation of a sovereign national state with autonomies for provinces, regions and municipalities.

Ahead of the September 1900 elections to the Constituent Assembly, the party formed the 'Democratic Republican Coalition' together with the Democratic Union Party. The coalition was formed in order counter the growing influence of the Cuban National Party.

By not dividing their votes on two separate candidatures, the Republicans of Havana and the Democratic Union Party hoped to be able to win over the Cuban National Party. In the end, the Coalition was unsuccessful in its endeavor to defeat the Cuban National Party in Havana.

The candidate of the party for the 1 June 1901, municipal elections in Havana was Nicasio Estrada Mora. Estrada Mora lost to the Dr. Miguel Gener, who was supported by the Cuban National Party.

In the 1901 presidential election, the Republican Party of Havana and the Cuban National Party supported the candidature of Tomás Estrada Palma for president and Luis Estévez Romero as vice-president. Estrada Palma won the election, as his contender Bartolomé Masó withdrew in protest of fraudulent functioning of the electoral machinery. After Estrada Palma's victory, the Republican Party of Havana became the ruling party in the country, whilst the Cuban National Party was dissolved.

The Republican Party of Havana was dissolved in 1906, after the fraudulent re-election of Estrada Palma, the brief uprising of the Little War of August and the subsequent Second Occupation of Cuba.
