= Carlos de la Rosa Hernández =

Vice President of Cuba

7th Vice President of Cuba
- In office 20 May 1925 – 1928
- President: Gerardo Machado
- Preceded by: Francisco Carrillo Morales
- Succeeded by: Federico Laredo Brú

Mayor of Cárdenas, Cuba
- In office 12 years

Cuban Senate
- In office "Senator for Life"

Personal details
- Born: September 28, 1869 Camajuaní
- Died: February 9, 1933 (Aged 63) Havana

Military service
- Branch/service: Cuban Liberation Army
- Battles/wars: Cuban War of Independence

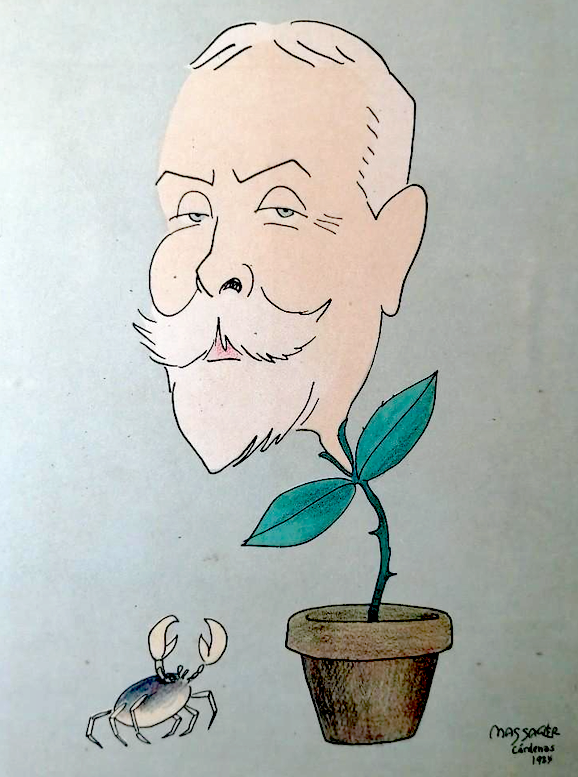
Carlos de la Rosa Hernández as drawn by Conrado Walter Massaguer in 1924.

Carlos de la Rosa Hernández was a Cuban soldier and politician. He served as Vice President of Cuba from 1925 to 1928. For twelve years, he served as the Mayor of Cárdenas, Cuba. He also served as a Cuban Senator.

== Life ==
Carlos de la Rosa Hernández was born in Camajuaní, in the province of Las Villas, on September 28, 1869.

He attained the rank of Colonel in the Mambí Army and fought in his native province during the Cuban War of Independence.

Following the establishment of the Republic of Cuba, de la Rosa served for several years as a senator. A member of the Liberal Party of Cuba, he was elected Vice President of the Republic alongside President Gerardo Machado, serving from 1925 until 1928.

His Vice Presidential inauguration was at 9:45 in the morning on May 20 in the chambers of the Cuban Senate in a joint session of the Congress of Cuba. Attending his inauguration were the U.S. Ambassador Enoch Crowder, First Secretary Curtis C. Jordan, and the Mexican Ambassador Aarón Sáenz Garza.

His tenure as vice president ended with the 1928 constitutional reform law that declared the office of Vice President of Cuba to be unconstitutional, at which point he became "Senator for life".

In his final years, de la Rosa withdrew from political life. He died of natural causes in Havana on February 9, 1933. Just months after his death, General Machado's dictatorship was overthrown by the Cuban General Strike of 1933.
