= Gladys María Bejerano Portela =

Cuban politician (born 1947)

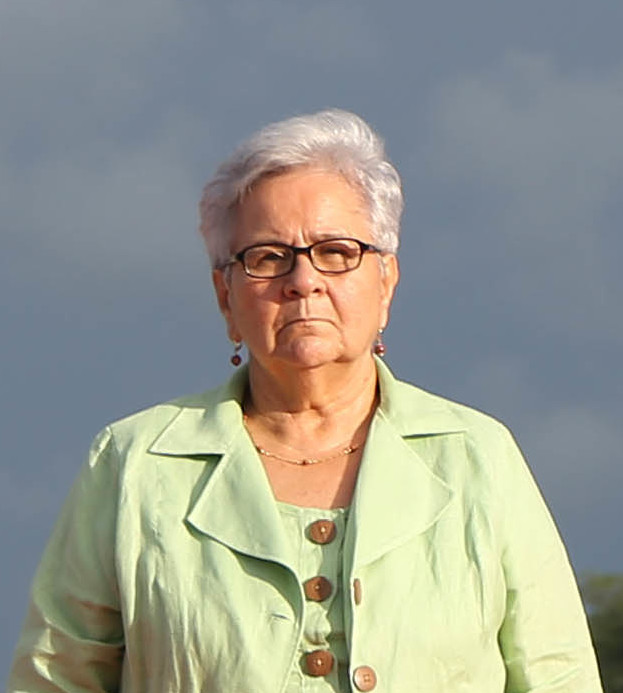
- Bejerano Portela in 2019

Vice President of the Council of State of Cuba
- In office 20 December 2009 – 10 October 2019

Personal details
- Born: January 7, 1947 (age 79)
- Party: Communist Party of Cuba
- Profession: Politician

Gladys María Bejerano Portela (born January 7, 1947) was Vice President of the Council of State of Cuba, and serves as the Comptroller General of Cuba.

Bejerano Portela was promoted in 2006 as Minister of Audit and Control. Prior to that position, she was the Vice Minister of Auditing and Control under Lina Olinda Pedraza Rodríguez. Bejerano Portela has served as Comptroller General of Cuba since 2009 to 2019 succeeding Juan Almeida Bosque.

Bejerano Portela is also a member of the subcommittee of the Intosai Professional Standards Committee (PSC) that oversees International Standards of Supreme Audit Institutions (ISSAI) and INTOSAI Guidance for Good Governance (INTOSAI GOV). She holds a degree and licentiate (equivalent of Bachelor of Arts) in social sciences.
