= Lesbia Soravilla =

Cuban writer, feminist and activist

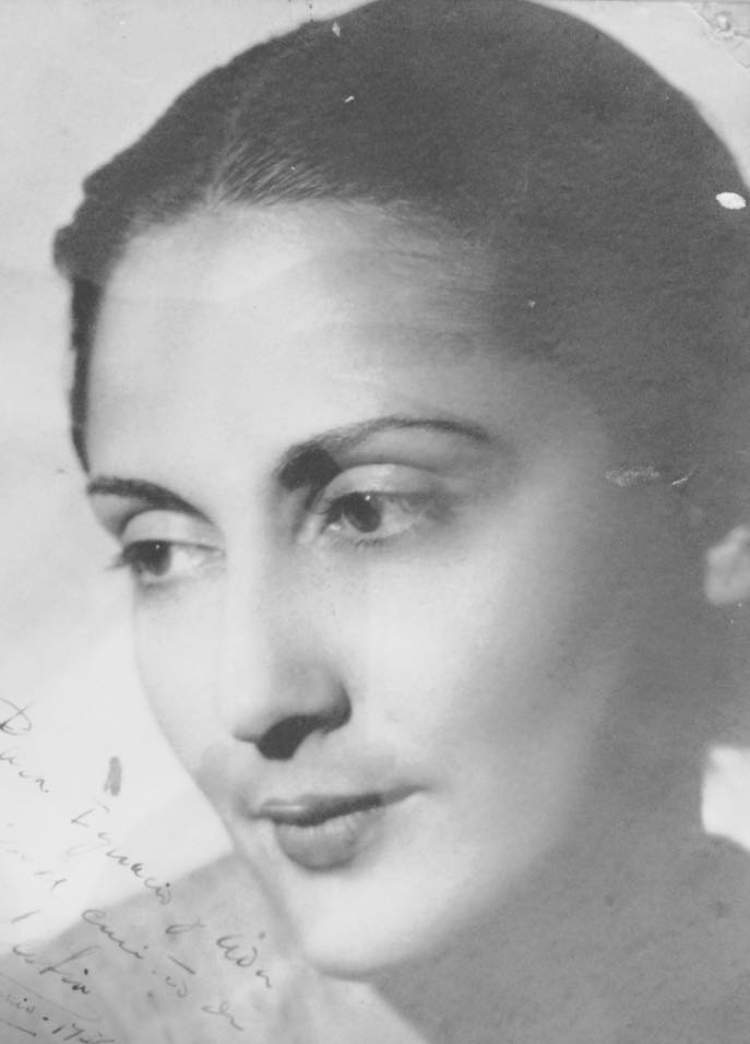
- Born: Lesbia Soravilla; 22 May 1906; Camagüey, Cuba
- Died: January 1989 (aged 82)
- Occupation: Writer
- Writing career
- Language: Spanish
- Period: 1920s and 1930s
- Genres: Poetry, novels
- Literary movement: Feminist

Lesbia Soravilla (22 May 1906 – January 1989) was a Cuban writer, feminist and activist, prominent in the feminist movement of the 1920s and 1930s. Her work, including poetry and novels, dealt with feminist issues. Her novels include El dolor de vivir (1932) and Cuando libertan los esclavos (1936).

== Biography ==
Born in Camagüey, Soravilla worked as a journalist for El Mundo. As an activist, Soravilla participated in the founding of several organizations for the rights of women such as the Club Femenino de Cuba (Women's Club of Cuba) and the Unión Nacional de Mujeres (National Union of Women), along with other writers such as Ofelia Rodríguez Acosta, Berta Arocena de Martínez Márquez, Julieta Carreta and Tete Casuso. With Acosta, she belonged to the group of the first exponents of the so-called "cuento caribeño" ("Caribbean story"), a group of Caribbean writers who sought to defend the rights of women in their respective countries. Along with Graziela Garbalosa, Soravilla was marginalized, leading to a discovery of personal freedom. She associated with additional activist writers of the time, such as Irma Pedroso, Dulce Maria Loynaz, and Flora Diaz Parrado.

Writing on the influence of Hollywood movies on women in Cuba, Soravilla noted that the effect was clearly seen among all sections of women, irrespective of their class distinction. It had an effect on the maids also who, in particular, during their break period from work, would present themselves with makeup in a charming and appealing way.

In her novel Cuando libertan los esclavos published in 1936, Soravilla has one of the female characters express her inability to break a marriage even though her husband was abusive, considering the negative approach in the society towards divorce, particularly because of the high status of her parents in the society.

In another novel titled El dolor de-vivir published in 1932, Soravilla has brought out, in a conversational mode between a female activist and her writer friend, the changing approach in a society women from a fashionable lady to a political activist whose writings about feminist movement made her very popular. In this feminist novel, she also incorporates the personage of Mariblanca Sabas Alomá into the fictional setting, a dialogue between a free love advocate and a writer.

Married Oscar Ugarriza Had two sons: Ricardo Ugarriza, Oscar Ugarriza and daughter Carmenchú Ugarriza Vaillant

Divorced and later married Angel Manuel Egaña. Had a daughter. Amelie Egaña.

Grandchildren:

Charles Vaillant Ugarriza

Annette Vaillant Ugarriza

María Vaillant Ugarriza

Carmenchu Ugarriza

Lillian Ugarriza

Lourdes Ugarriza

Nicolle Ugarriza

Maité Goicouría

Tony Goicouría

Ana Amelia Goicouría

Marta Elena Goicouría

== Selected works ==
- El dolor de-vivir (1932)
- Cuando libertan los esclavos (1936)
