= Rafael Guas Inclán =

Cuban politician

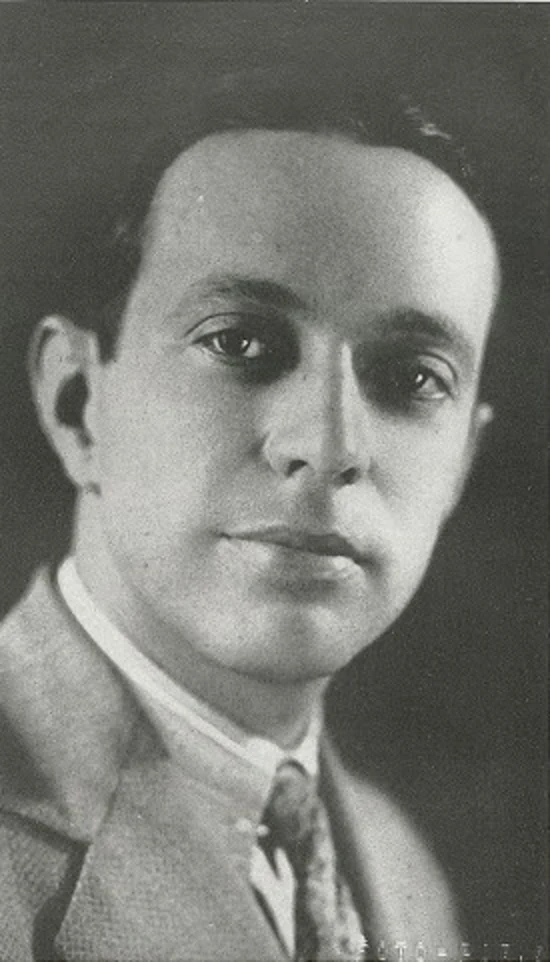

12th Vice President of Cuba
- In office 24 February 1955 – 1 January 1959
- President: Fulgencio Batista
- Preceded by: Guillermo Alonso Pujol
- Succeeded by: Office abolished

Personal details
- Born: 1896
- Died: 12 October 1975 (aged 78–79)

Rafael Guas Inclán (1896 – October 12, 1975) was a Cuban politician who served as Vice President of Cuba from 1955 to 1959.

He was son of Carlos Guas Pagueras, a Cuban independence general and senator and Rosa Inclan. He was graduate of the University of Havana School of Law where he also later taught classes. Guas was lifelong member of the Liberal Party of Cuba, in 1925 was the youngest elected person to the Cuban House of Representatives, which he presided from April 1927 to August 1933.

Guas went into exile, with his father and brother Gregorio (a dentist and also member of the Cuban House of Representatives) after President Gerardo Machado was overthrown in August 1933. The three were involved in an automobile accident in Miami on Dec. 6, 1935, as a result of which their father died. The brothers then returned to Cuba to bury their father.

He was a delegate to the Cuban Constitutional Convention 1939-40. He served as governor of the Havana province (1940–48) and senator (1948-52). He was Minister of Communications 1953-54. As president of the Liberal Party, was elected Vice President of Cuba from February 24, 1955 to February 24, 1959 as a compromise candidate under Fulgencio Batista, but he resigned on January 1, 1959. Guas was elected Mayor of Havana on November 3, 1958, but did not assume the post after Castro seized power on January 1, 1959. A street mob burned his law office that day.

Guas sought asylum in the Chilean Embassy in Havana and returned to exile with his wife, Luisa Maria Decall and children, Hilda, Luisa, and Carlos Rafael Guas Decall (an attorney and member of the Cuban House of Representatives). He tried to join the Brigade 2506 prior to the April 1961 Central Intelligence Agency-sponsored Bay of Pigs invasion but was rejected because of his age. His son, Carlos Rafael, died in combat at the Bay of Pigs.

He died in Miami and is buried at Caballero Rivero Woodlawn North Park Cemetery and Mausoleum there.
