= Military Government of Cuba =

1898–1902 U.S. military occupation and administration of Cuba

Military Government of Cuba Gobierno Militar de Cuba (Spanish)
- 1898–1902
- Flag Coat of arms
- Motto: E Pluribus Unum "Out of Many, One"
- Anthem: Salve, Columbia "Hail, Columbia"
- Great Seal of the USA

- Status: United States military occupation
- Capital: Havana
- Common languages: Cuban Spanish; Haitian Creole
- Religion: Roman Catholicism; Santería; Judaism
- Military-Governor
  - 1898–1899: John R. Brooke
  - 1899: Leonard Wood
- Historical era: Modern Era
  - Teller Amendment: 20 April 1898
  - Treaty of Paris: 10 December 1898
  - Platt Amendment: 2 March 1901
  - Independence: 20 May 1902
Preceded by	Succeeded by
Captaincy General of Cuba; Republic of Cuba in Arms	Republic of Cuba
- Today part of: Cuba

The Military Government of Cuba (Spanish: Gobierno Militar de Cuba) was a provisional military government in Cuba that was established in the aftermath of the Spanish–American War in 1898 when Spain ceded Cuba to the United States. Cuba obtained its independence from the United States in May 1902.

This period was also referred to as the First occupation of Cuba, to distinguish it from a second occupation from 1906 to 1909, after Cuba had gained its independence. United States Army forces involved in the garrisoning of the island during this time were honored with the Army of Cuban Occupation Medal after its establishment in 1915.

== Timeline ==
1898

- 15 February: The USS Maine explodes in Havana harbor.
- 20 April: President McKinley signs a congressional joint resolution declaring war against Spain. It includes the Teller Amendment asserting U.S. intentions in declaring war on Spain exclude exercising "sovereignty, jurisdiction or control" over Cuba, "except for pacification thereof".
- 10 December: Spain and the United States sign the Treaty of Paris. Spanish–American War officially ends.

1899

- 1 January: Military government installed by the United States.
- 11 April: Spain relinquishes sovereignty over Cuba.

1900

- 16 June: Cuban local elections.
- 1 July: Municipal officials installed by the military governor were replaced with elected officials.

1901

- 21 February: Constitution of the Republic of Cuba is adopted.
- 31 December: Estrada Palma is elected the first president of the Republic of Cuba.

1902

- 20 May: The 1901 constitution takes effect. Birth of the Republic of Cuba.

== Platt Amendment ==
The Platt Amendment defined the terms by which the United States would cease its occupation of Cuba. The amendment, placed into an army appropriations bill was designed to give back control of Cuba to the Cuban people. It had eight conditions to which the Cuban government needed to adhere before full sovereignty would be transferred. The main conditions of the amendment prohibited Cuba from signing any treaty allowing foreign powers to use the island for military purposes. The United States also maintained the right to interfere with Cuban independence in order to maintain a certain level of protection of life, though the extent of this intrusion was not defined. Most significant, the amendment forced the Cuban government to sign a treaty officially binding the amendment to law.

The United States reasoning behind the amendment was based on the significant commercial interests held on the island. Spain had previously been unable to preserve U.S. interests and maintain law and order. At the end of military occupation, the amendment served as the primary method of ensuring a permanent presence. Due to the previously enacted Teller Amendment, the United States was forced to grant Cuba its independence after Spanish rule ended. Since the Platt Amendment was successfully incorporated into the constitution in Cuba, influence was maintained without direct U.S. involvement in the country.

== See also ==
- American imperialism
