= Democratic Union Party (Cuba) =

Democratic Union Party Partido Unión Democrática
- Founded: 1899
- Dissolved: 1901
- Ideology: Conservatism

The Democratic Union Party (Spanish: Partido Unión Democrática) was a political party in Cuba. The party was founded in 1899 by conservative sectors. In an alliance with the Republican Party of Havana, the DUP won the Constitutional Assembly elections in 1900. The DUP was dissolved in 1901.
