= Miguel Díaz-Canel =

Leader of Cuba since 2021

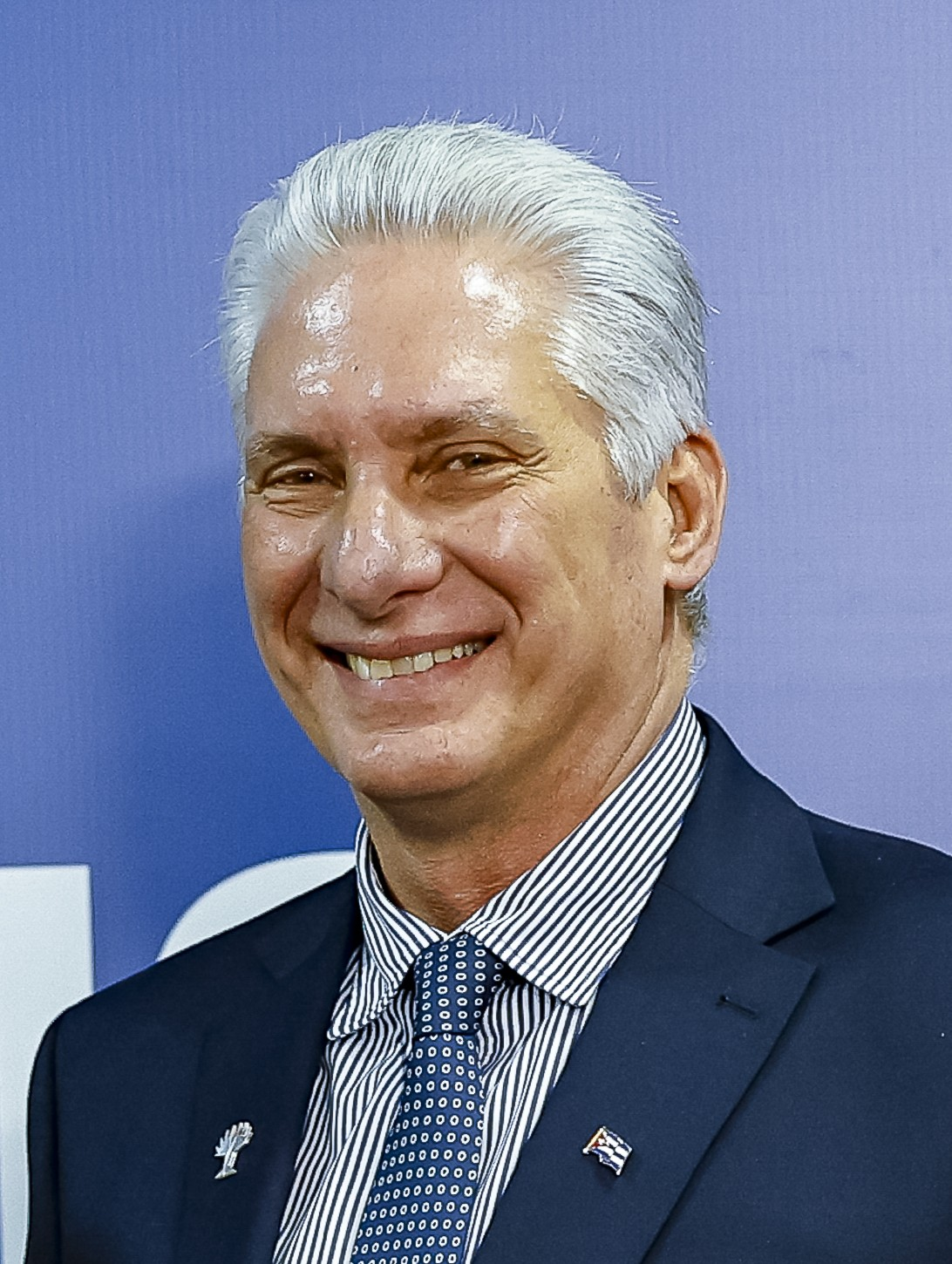
- Díaz-Canel in 2025

First Secretary of the Communist Party of Cuba
- Incumbent
- Assumed office 19 April 2021
- Preceded by: Raúl Castro

17th President of Cuba
- Incumbent
- Assumed office 10 October 2019
- Prime Minister: Manuel Marrero Cruz
- Vice President: Salvador Valdés Mesa
- Preceded by: Himself (as President of the Council of State); Osvaldo Dorticós Torrado (as President, 1976)

President of the Council of State and Ministers of Cuba
- In office 19 April 2018 – 10 October 2019
- First Vice President: Salvador Valdés Mesa
- Preceded by: Raúl Castro
- Succeeded by: Manuel Marrero Cruz (as Prime Minister)

19th Vice President of the Council of State and Ministers
- In office 24 February 2013 – 19 April 2018
- President: Raúl Castro
- Preceded by: José Ramón Machado Ventura
- Succeeded by: Salvador Valdés Mesa

Minister of Education
- In office 8 May 2009 – 21 March 2012
- President: Raúl Castro
- Preceded by: Juan Vela Valdés
- Succeeded by: Rodolfo Alarcón Ortíz

Personal details
- Born: 20 April 1960 (age 66) Placetas, La Villas, (Note: Now Villa Clara) Cuba
- Party: Communist Party of Cuba
- Spouse(s): Marta Villanueva (divorced) Lis Cuesta Peraza (m. 2009)
- Education: University of Las Villas (BS)
- Occupation: Politician
- Profession: Engineer; professor

Miguel Díaz-Canel Bermúdez (Latin American Spanish: [miˈɣel ˈdi.as kaˈnel]; born 20 April 1960) is a Cuban politician and engineer who has served as the 8th first secretary of the Communist Party of Cuba and the leader of Cuba since 2021. In 2019 he became the 17th president of Cuba and was president of the Council of State from 2018 until 2019.

Díaz-Canel succeeded the brothers Fidel and Raúl Castro, becoming Cuba's first leader who was not a Castro since the Cuban Revolution ended in 1959, and its first head of state since 1976 not from the Castro family. He has been a member of the Cuban Politburo since 2003. He served as Minister of Higher Education from 2009 until 2012, when he was promoted to Vice President of the Council of Ministers. In 2013, he was elected as First Vice President of the Council of State.

In 2018, Díaz-Canel succeeded Raúl Castro as President of the Council. After a new constitution was enacted, he assumed the recreated office of President of Cuba. On 19 April 2021, he was appointed First Secretary of the Communist Party of Cuba following Raúl Castro's exit from the role.

== Early life ==
Díaz-Canel was born on 20 April 1960 to Aída Bermúdez, a schoolteacher, and Miguel Díaz-Canel, a mechanical lathe operator, in Placetas, Las Villas (now called Villa Clara). He is of direct paternal Spanish-Asturian descent; his great-grandfather, Ramón Díaz-Canel, left Castropol in Asturias, Spain for Havana in the late 19th century. He graduated from the Central University of Las Villas in Santa Clara, Cuba with a bachelor's degree in electrical engineering in 1982. After being conscripted and serving in the Cuban Revolutionary Armed Forces for three years, he returned to the university in April 1985 to teach engineering. In 1987, he completed an international mission in Nicaragua as First Secretary of the Young Communist League of Villa Clara.

== Political career ==
In 1993, Miguel Díaz-Canel began working with the Communist Party of Cuba and in 1994 was elected First Secretary of the Provincial Party Committee of Villa Clara Province, the seniormost role in provincial government. He gained a reputation for competence in this post, during which time it is reported that he supported LGBT rights at a time when many in the province frowned upon homosexuality. In 2003, he was elected to the same position in Holguín Province. Also in 2003, he was co-opted as a member of the Politburo of the Communist Party of Cuba.

Díaz-Canel was appointed Minister of Higher Education in May 2009, a position that he held until 22 March 2012, when he became Vice President of the Council of Ministers (Deputy Prime Minister). In 2013 he additionally became First Vice President of the Council of State. As First Vice President of the Council of State, Díaz-Canel acted as senior deputy to the president, Raúl Castro.

== Presidency (2018–present) ==
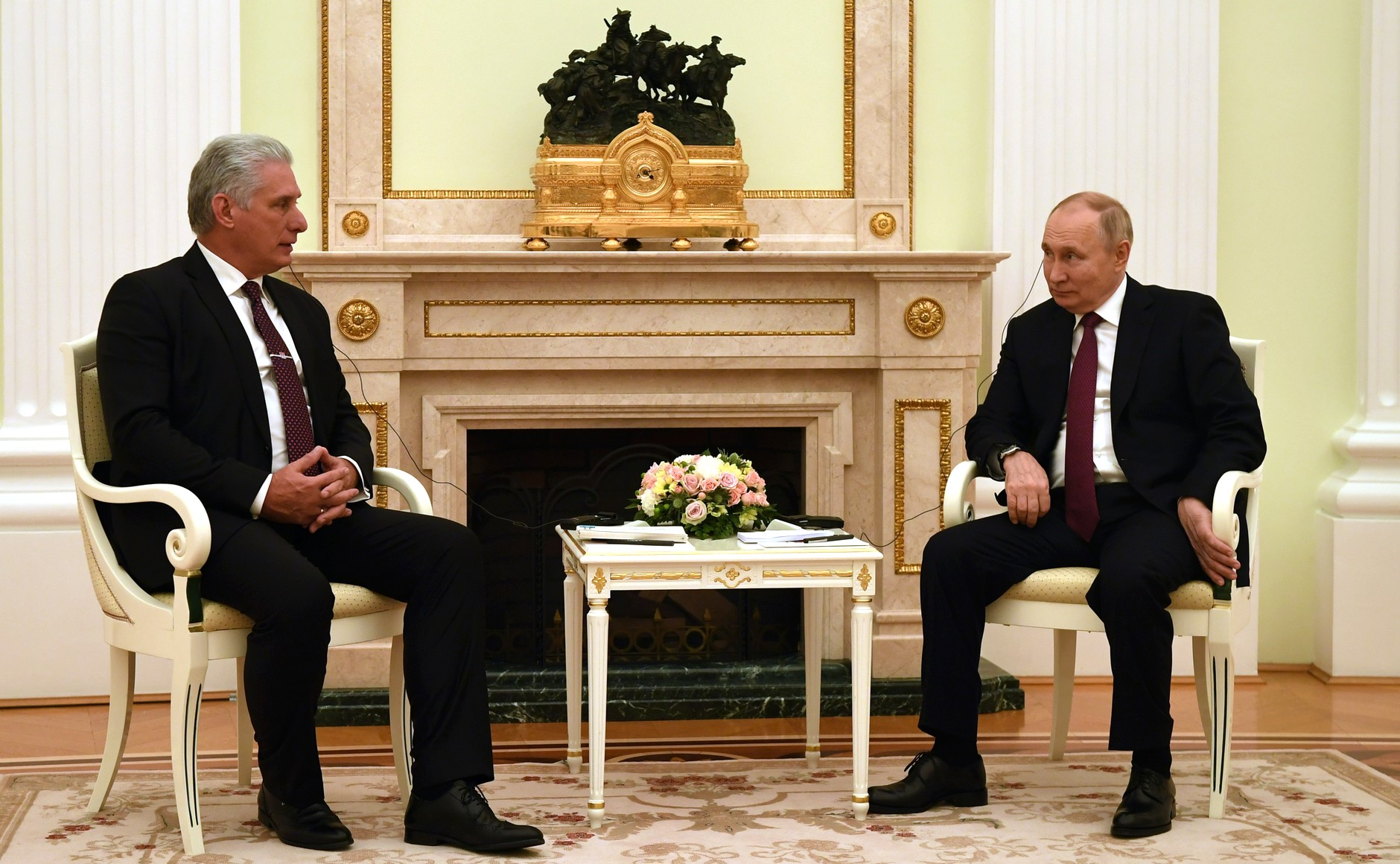
Díaz-Canel with Russian president Vladimir Putin in the Kremlin, 22 November 2022

In 2018, the 86-year-old Raúl Castro stepped down from the position as president of the Council of State and the Council of Ministers, though he remained First Secretary of the Communist Party of Cuba and the commander-in-chief of the Cuban Revolutionary Armed Forces. On 18 April 2018, Díaz-Canel was announced as the only candidate to succeed Castro as president. He was formally elected by the National Assembly on 19 April and sworn in on the same day. He is the first president born after the 1959 Cuban Revolution and the first since 1976 not to be a member of the Castro family.

Díaz-Canel received a visit from Venezuelan president Nicolás Maduro just two days after his inauguration. He met with Maduro again in May 2018 in Caracas, Venezuela, during his first official foreign visit as head of state. In his first multinational political trip since becoming president, Díaz-Canel traveled in November 2018 to visit many of Cuba's Eurasian allies. Diplomatic meetings were held in Russia, North Korea, China, Vietnam, and Laos. Brief stopovers in the United Kingdom and France included meetings with British parliamentarians and French leaders. In March 2019, Díaz-Canel and his wife hosted Charles, Prince of Wales, and Camilla, Duchess of Cornwall, in Havana as the first British royals to visit the island.

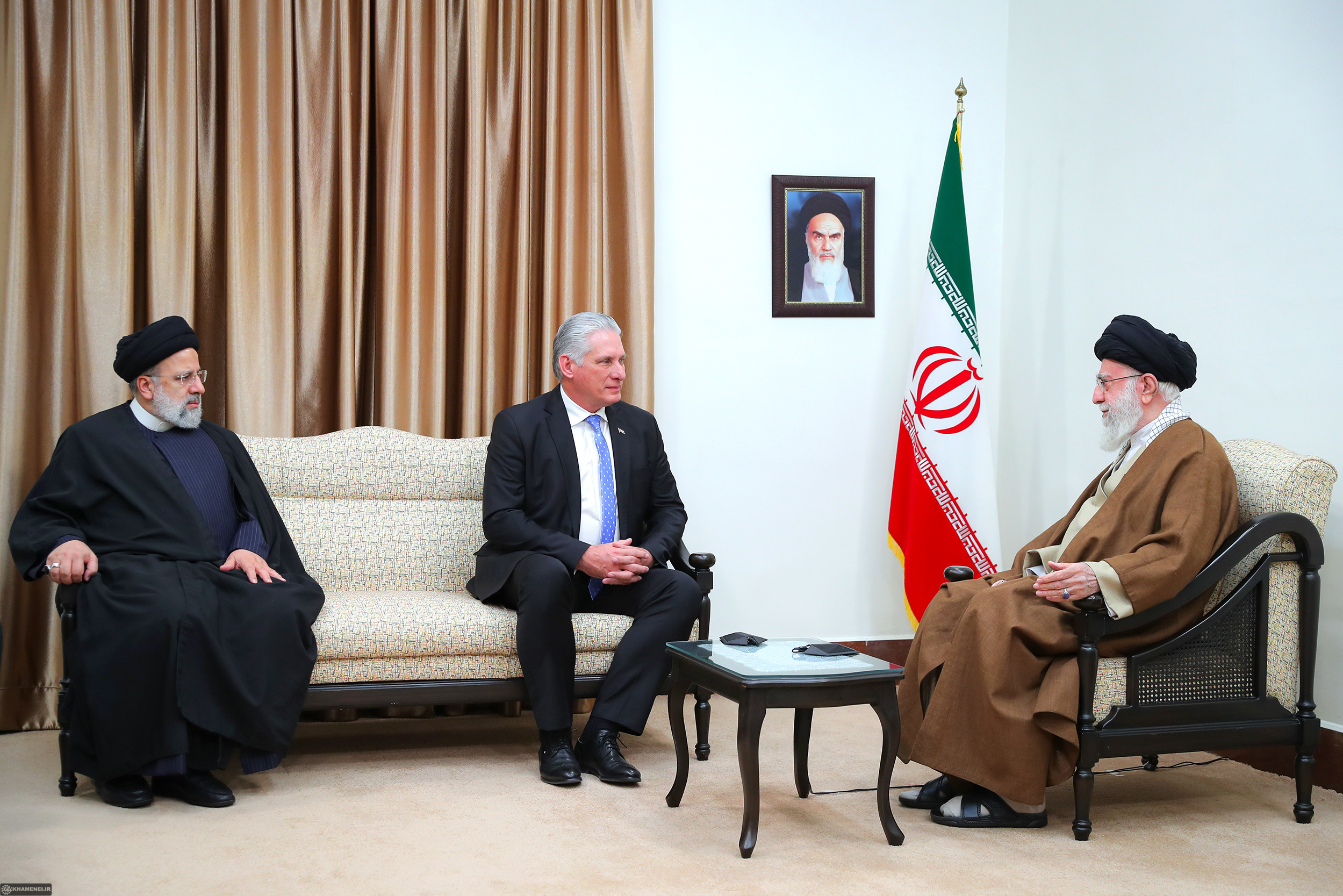
Díaz-Canel with the supreme leader of Iran Ali Khamenei and Iranian president Ibrahim Raisi in 2023

In October 2019, Díaz-Canel became the President of the Republic of Cuba, an office which was recreated that February after a series of constitutional reforms were approved in a constitutional referendum. The office replaced the one he had held since April of the previous year, which was the President of the Council of State, which was previously the head of state of Cuba. The position of President of the Council of State became a less important position and is now carried out by Esteban Lazo Hernández in his authority as the President of the National Assembly of People's Power.

Díaz-Canel's administration has faced criticism over its authoritarian governance and restrictions on political freedoms, with the Inter-American Commission on Human Rights and other International Organizations describing Cuba's system of government as a dictatorship. During the 2021 protests, he was quoted as saying: "The order of combat has been given—into the streets, revolutionaries!" Diaz-Canel's reforms, among others, limited the presidency to two consecutive five-year terms and banned discrimination based on gender, gender identity, or sexual orientation. His government also reformed the country's Family Code in 2022, after a referendum was approved, which, among other things, legalised same-sex marriage, same-sex adoption, and altruistic surrogacy. These policies have been described as the "most progressive" in Latin America.

== Leader of Cuba (2021–present) ==
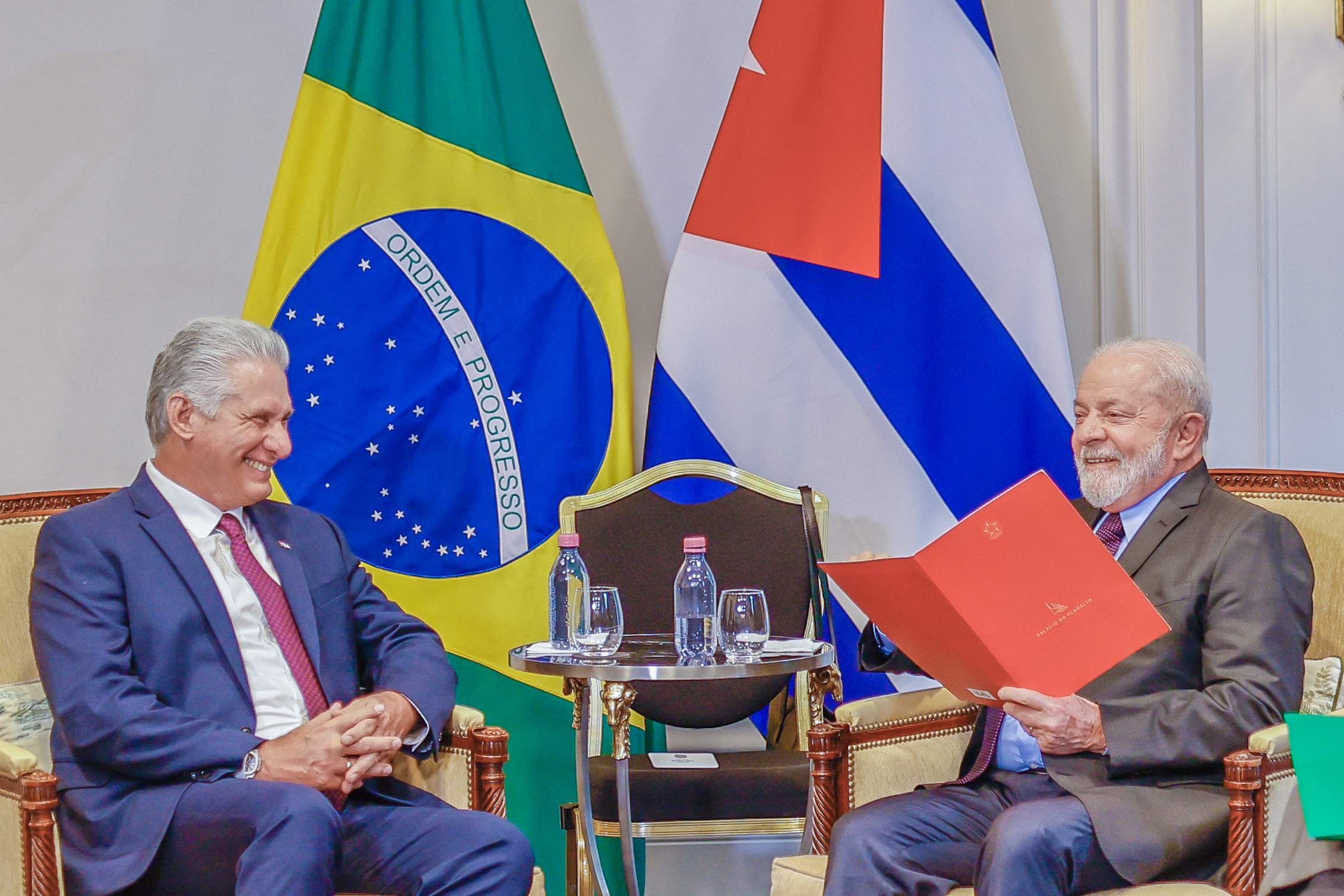
Díaz-Canel with Brazilian president Luiz Inácio Lula da Silva in Paris, France, 22 June 2023

On 19 April 2021, Díaz-Canel officially became the First Secretary of the Communist Party of Cuba after the resignation of Raúl Castro making him the leader of Cuba in fact as well as in name. BBC News said that Díaz-Canel is loyal to the Castros' ideologies. In July 2021, Díaz-Canel said that the United States embargo against Cuba and economic sanctions were responsible for the conditions that led to the 2021 Cuban protests. He urged government-supporting citizens to take to the streets in counter-protest to respond to the demonstrations, saying in a special television broadcast: "The order to fight has been given – into the streets, revolutionaries!"

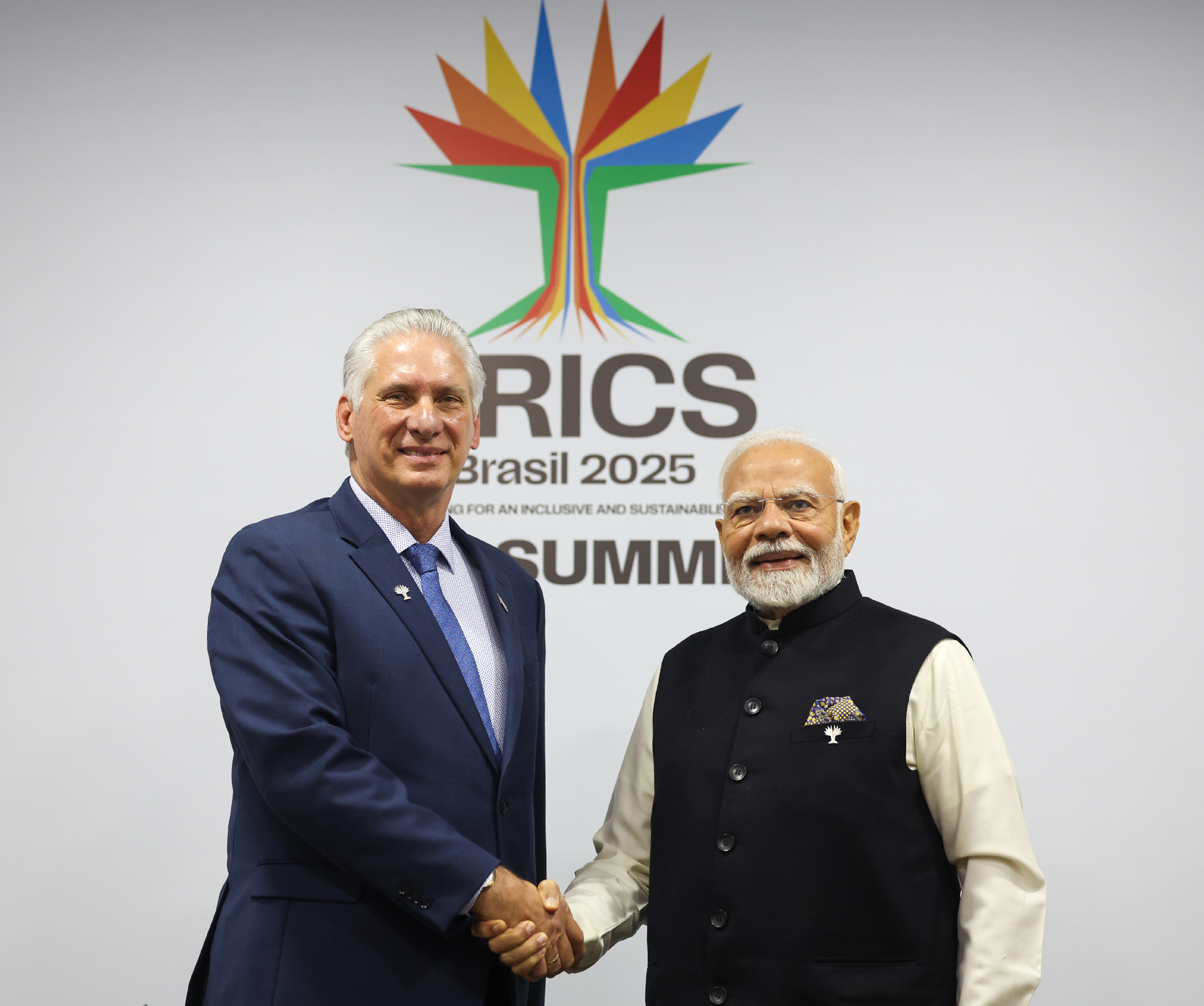
Díaz-Canel with Indian prime minister Narendra Modi at the 17th BRICS summit in Rio De Janeiro, Brazil, 6 July 2025

During the 2022 Russian invasion of Ukraine, the Cuban government blamed the United States for the crisis in Ukraine and backed Russia's right to self-defense against NATO expansion, but did not endorse the invasion, saying the conflict should be resolved diplomatically. Díaz-Canel visited Vladimir Putin in Moscow in November 2022, and the two leaders criticized Western sanctions against Cuba and Russia. They also opened a monument to Fidel Castro in one of Moscow's districts.

A 2022 Ipsos survey of 297 opinion leaders and prominent journalists from Argentina, Bolivia, Brazil, Chile, Colombia, Ecuador, Guatemala, Mexico, Panama, Peru, Puerto Rico, and the Dominican Republic found that Díaz-Canel's administration had a low approval rating, with 78% expressing disapproval and 14% expressing approval.

On 19 April 2023, Díaz-Canel was re-elected by the National Assembly for a second term. Salvador Valdés was elected as vice president. He was reelected with a landslide: 97.66% backing Díaz-Canel's and 93.4% supporting Valdés. Díaz-Canel condemns the genocide of Palestinians in Gaza, and refers to Israel as a "terrorist state". He has led multiple pro-Palestinian demonstrations in Cuba. The 2024–2026 Cuba blackouts were the most severe crisis that the country has experienced since the dissolution of the Soviet Union in 1991. Díaz-Canel blamed the blackout on the United States embargo against Cuba, which he said prevented much needed supplies and replacement parts from reaching Cuba. He cancelled his physical attendance at the 16th BRICS summit in Russia to attend to the blackout. Díaz-Canel stated that any protests to the government's response would not be tolerated and that all protesters would be "processed rigorously under our revolutionary law". Shortly after protests started in October 2024, Díaz-Canel and prime minister Manuel Marrero Cruz appeared on a televised address in military fatigues claiming "counter-revolutionaries from abroad" were fomenting protests in Cuba. Díaz-Canel said that "we are not going to accept and we will not allow anyone to act by provoking vandalistic acts, much less disturbing the peace of our people, and that is a conviction and that is a principle of our revolution".

The United States imposed sanctions on Díaz-Canel on 11 July 2025. Defense Minister Álvaro López Miera and Interior Minister Lázaro Álvarez Casas were also sanctioned for their "regime's brutality". On 5 June 2026, the US imposed additional sanctions on Díaz-Canel and his wife.

In January 2026, Díaz-Canel strongly condemned the U.S. military strikes in Venezuela and the subsequent capture of President Nicolás Maduro, labeling the actions as "state terrorism". On 15 January 2026, he was present, alongside Raúl Castro, 94, in a ceremony in Havana paying tribute to 32 Cuban soldiers killed in the United States intervention in Venezuela.

In March 2026, Díaz-Canel publicly confirmed for the first time that his government was engaged in diplomatic talks with the United States aimed at addressing a severe U.S.‑imposed oil and energy blockade that had left Cuba facing crippling fuel shortages and widespread power outages. The announcement came after years of frosty bilateral relations and was framed as an effort to find “solutions through dialogue” to longstanding differences between the two nations while respecting each side’s sovereignty and political systems. Díaz‑Canel said the discussions were in early stages and focused on alleviating the humanitarian and economic impact of the energy crisis. The talks were reported to involve U.S. officials including Secretary of State Marco Rubio, and were accompanied by actions such as the release of 51 political prisoners, in a move described as a goodwill gesture. The energy shortages worsened after the United States halted Venezuelan oil supplies to Cuba following the ousting of Venezuelan President Maduro, who had been a key energy supplier to the island.

== Honours and awards ==
=== Foreign honours ===
Ribbon	Distinction	Country	Date	Ref.
	Grand Collar of the Order of the State of Palestine	Palestine	11 May 2018	
	Collar of the Order of the Liberator	Venezuela	30 May 2018	
	Order of Ho Chi Minh	Vietnam	9 November 2018	
	Order of Agostinho Neto	Angola	1 July 2019	
	Collar of the Order of the Aztec Eagle	Mexico	11 February 2023	
	Grand Collar of the Order of Prince Henry	Portugal	14 July 2023	
	Grand Collar of the Order of the Most Ancient Welwitschia Mirabilis	Namibia	27 August 2023	

== Personal life ==
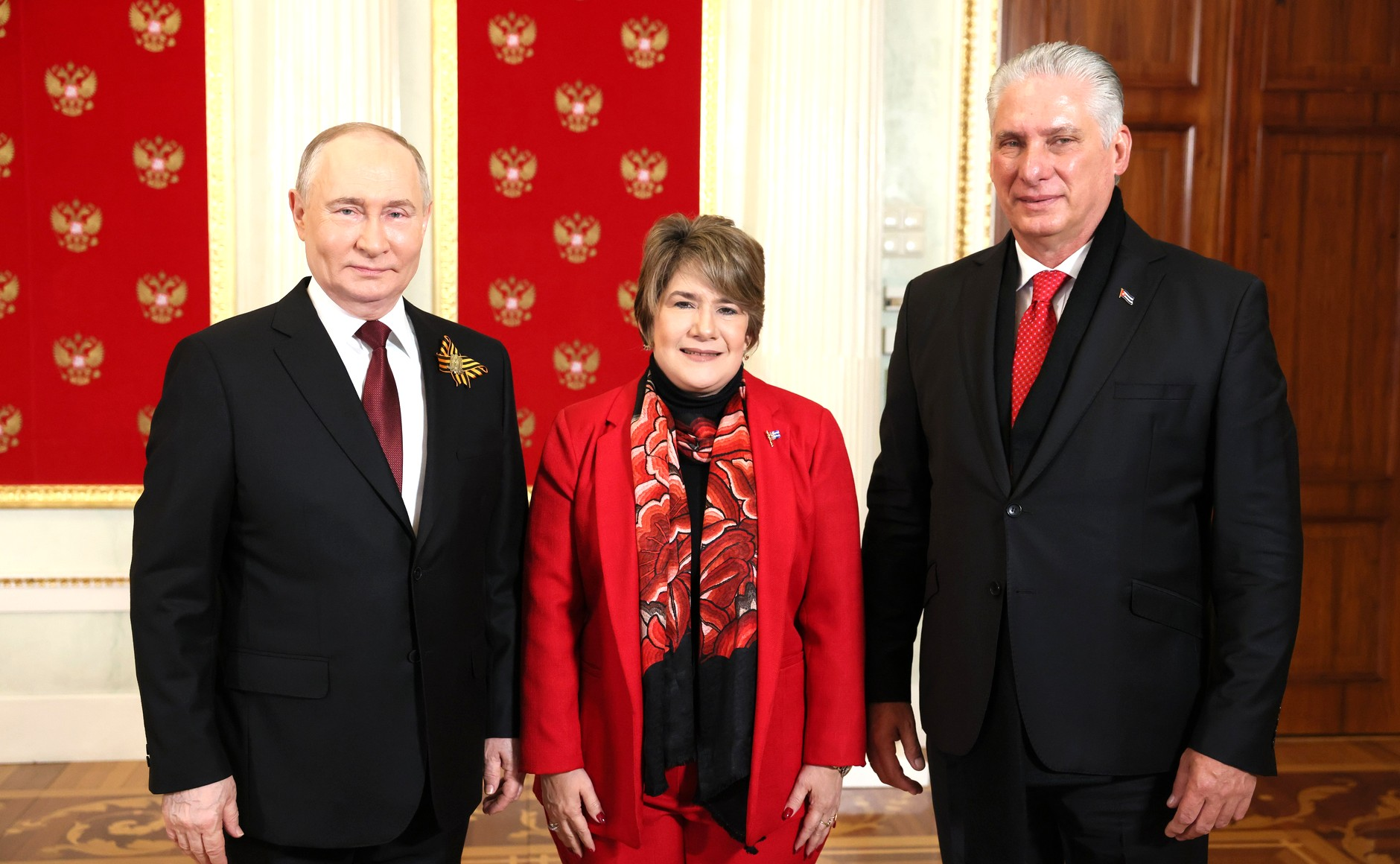
Díaz-Canel and his wife Lis Cuesta Peraza with Russian President Putin before the 2024 Victory Day Parade in Moscow, 9 May 2024

Díaz-Canel has two children from his marriage to his first wife, Marta Villanueva, which ended in divorce. He lives with his second wife, Lis Cuesta Peraza. On 23 March 2021, he obtained a PhD degree in technical sciences, defending a thesis titled "Government Management System Based on Science and Innovation for Sustainable Development in Cuba".

== See also ==
- List of current heads of state and government
- List of heads of the executive by approval rating
- List of international trips made by Miguel Díaz-Canel
- List of presidents of Cuba
- List of prime ministers of Cuba

== Notes ==
Party political offices
Preceded by Raúl Castro	8th First Secretary of the Communist Party of Cuba; 2021–present	Incumbent
Political offices
Preceded by Himself (as President of the Council of State and Ministers)	17th President of Cuba; 2019–present	Incumbent
Vacant Title last held by Osvaldo Dorticós Torrado (1976)	17th President of Cuba; 2019–present	Incumbent
Preceded by Raúl Castro	President of the Council of State and Ministers of Cuba; 2018–2019	Succeeded by Himself (as President); Manuel Marrero Cruz (as Prime Minister)
Preceded by José Ramón Machado Ventura	19th Vice President of the Council of State and Ministers of Cuba; 2013–2018	Succeeded by Salvador Valdés Mesa
