= Federal Republican Party of Las Villas =

Political party in Las Villas, Cuba

The Federal Republican Party of Las Villas (Spanish: Partido Republicano Federal de Las Villas) was a political party in Las Villas, Cuba. The party was founded in 1899 by the provincial governor José Miguel Gómez and Carlos Mendieta y Montefur. Pelayo García Santiago was the president of the party. Prominent party members included General José B. Alemán, Dr. Rafael Martínez Ortíz, General José de J. Monteagudo, José Manuel Berenguer, Francisco López Leyva, Lic. Benito Besada, José L. Robau, Eduardo Domínguez, Dr. Orestes Ferrara and Enrique Villuendas.

== Origins ==
The party announced its programme towards the end of January 1900. The programme called for the formation of a decentralized state with provincial autonomy.

On February 25, 1900, a meeting was held in Santiago de Cuba. The meeting had been called by the newspaper El Cubano Libre. The meeting formed a group, Convención, which was to contest municipal elections in the city. The Executive of the group was made up by General Francisco Sánchez Echevarría, Eduardo Yero Buduén, Antonio Bravo Correoso, Alberto Quintana, Desidero Fajardo Ortíz and Gregorio Muria. The group merged into the Federal Republican Party of Las Villas, but retained its own political identity. For example, the group in Santiago de Cuba began publishing La República as its own organ.

== 1900 municipal election ==
Ahead of the 1900 municipal election, the Federal Republican Party eliminated all potential opposition forces in Las Villas province through the use of violence and coercion. The campaign of intimidation was led by the governor Miguel Gómez and José de J. Monteagudo, who was head of the Guardia Rural. In the end, no other political group dared to contest the elections in Las Villas.

In the September 1900 election to the Constituent Convention, the party won all the seats from Las Villas. The delegates of the party were General José Luis Robau, General José Braulio Alemán, General José de Jesús Monteagudo, General José Miguel Gómez, Colonel Enrique Villuendas, Lieutenant Martín Morúa Delgado and Dr. Pedro González Llorente.

In 1900, Benito Besada had been assigned by the National Assembly to send a message to the U.S. president William McKinley. Besada didn't fulfill this mission, and his membership in the party was terminated. Robau and Aléman also left the party.
