= Cuban National Party =

Cuban National Party Partido Nacional Cubano
- Founded: 1899
- Dissolved: 1901
- Merged into: Republican Party of Havana
- Headquarters: Havana, Cuba

The Cuban National Party (Spanish: Partido Nacional Cubano) was a political party in Cuba. At the very beginning of the 20th century, it was one of the three main political parties on the island. The party favoured independence for Cuba.

== History ==
The Party was one of two political groupings (the other one being the Cuban National League) that emerged from the Junta Patriótica in Havana in March 1899. The Party was founded on March 24, 1899, at a meeting in Havana of presidents of patriotic clubs and neighbourhood committees as well as former members of the Junta Patriótica. At the meeting, Enrique Messonier (a former anarchist leader) called for a people's meeting to be held in Havana, to elect a commission to organize the work of the neighbourhood committees.

In agreement with Messonier's proposal, a meeting was held on March 26, 1899. The meeting elected an Organizing Commission of the Neighbourhood Committees. The Commission consisted of Carlos de la Torre, Enrique Messioner, Francisco Alonso, Alfredo Zayas, Nicasio Estrada Mora, Gabriel Casuso, J. R. O'Farrill, Miguel Verna, Evelio R. Lendián, Cándido Hoyos, José F. Torralbas, Benito Lagueruela, Eduardo González, Pedro Rodríguez, Ernesto Fernández, Antonio González Pérez, Medina Arango, Luis Febles and Ambrosio Borges.

The Cuban National Party rapidly became one of the most important political groups in the country at the time. Compared to other contemporary political parties, the Cuban National Party had a broader class base. The party had members from the small bourgeoisie of the province, working class elements and people of color.

In April 1899, the Cuban National League merged into the neighbourhood committees of the Cuban National Party. On April 10, a joint declaration of the Propaganda Commission of the Cuban National League and the Organizing Committee of the Cuban National Party formalized this merger.

At the meeting of the Organizing Committee on May 2, 1899, it was decided that an invitation to form local committees for the party and to distribute the invitation nationwide.

=== 1900 elections ===
In the 1900 local elections, the party won in the capital Havana. Dr. Miguel Gener, who had been supported by the party, became mayor of the city.

Ahead of the September 1900 elections to the Constituent Assembly two adversaries of the party, the Democratic Union Party and the Republican Party of Havana, formed a joint coalition in a bid to defeat the Cuban National Party. Nevertheless, the Cuban National Party won the elections in Havana.

=== Dissolution ===
In the 1901 presidential election, the Cuban National Party and the Republican Party of Havana supported the candidature of Tomás Estrada Palma for president and Luis Estévez Romero as vice-president. Estrada Palma won the election, as his contender Bartolomé Masó withdrew in protest of fraudulent functioning of the electoral machinery. After Estrada Palma's victory, the Republican Party of Havana became the ruling party in the country, whilst the Cuban National Party was dissolved.
