= El Mejunje =

LGBT cultural centre in Santa Clara, Cuba

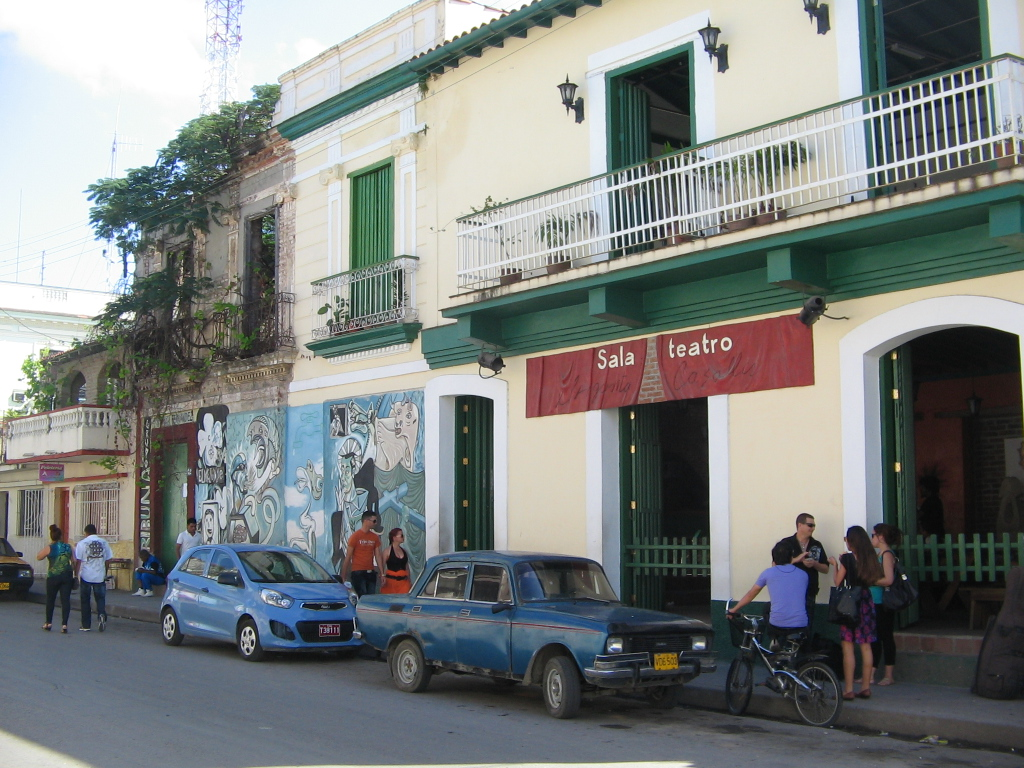
- Facade and theatre room

- Location within Cuba

General information
- Location: Calle Marta Abreu / Juan Bruno Zayas y Alemán, Santa Clara, Cuba
- Coordinates: 22.406677°N 79.967227°W
- Completed: 26 January 1985

El Mejunje (Spanish for The Mixture), also known as El Mejunje de Silverio after the surname of its founder and director, Ramón Silverio, is a Cuban LGBT cultural center and space located in the city of Santa Clara. It lies on the central Calle Marta Abreu, near the corner with Calle Juan Bruno Zayas, close to the Parque Vidal and La Caridad Theatre, next to the Saint Claire of Assisi Cathedral.

== History ==
Created as a simple gathering of bohemians and intellectuals, the centre grew as multifaceted and unconventional cultural space. It was installed in the ruins of an old hotel and started its activities in 1985. People related to the centre are colloquially known as Mejunjeros.

== Cultural activities ==
The "Mejunje" is an LGBTQ cultural centre, involved into several social campaigns, as the ones on HIV/AIDS prevention, against homophobia and social discrimination. As for the meaning of its name and the purposes of its founder, El Mejunje is not a simple gay club: it is conceived as an open space shared by everyone independently of sexual orientation, to promote social integration. The activities of the centre include a theatre, a café, an art gallery in the second roof and a little music venue in which are held concerts of various musical genres, ranging from rock'n roll to Cuban folk music.

The activities also include social and cultural initiatives of interest to both children and adults, film screenings, and the Gay Saturday disco every Saturday night.

== Gallery ==
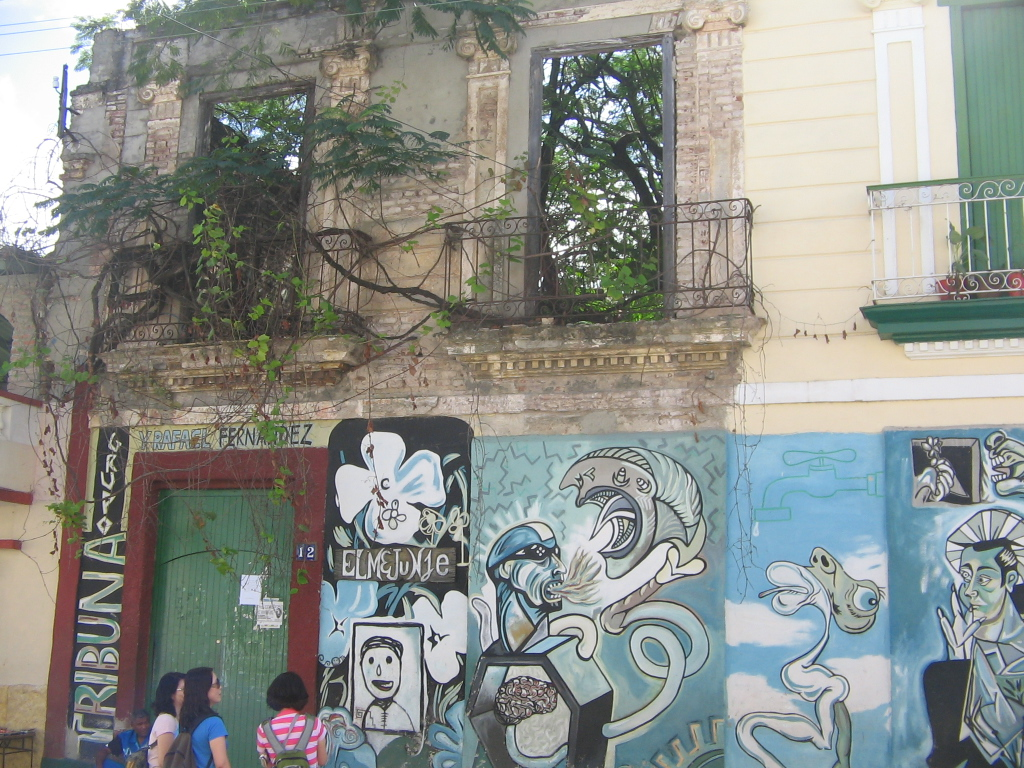
Detail of the facade with graffiti

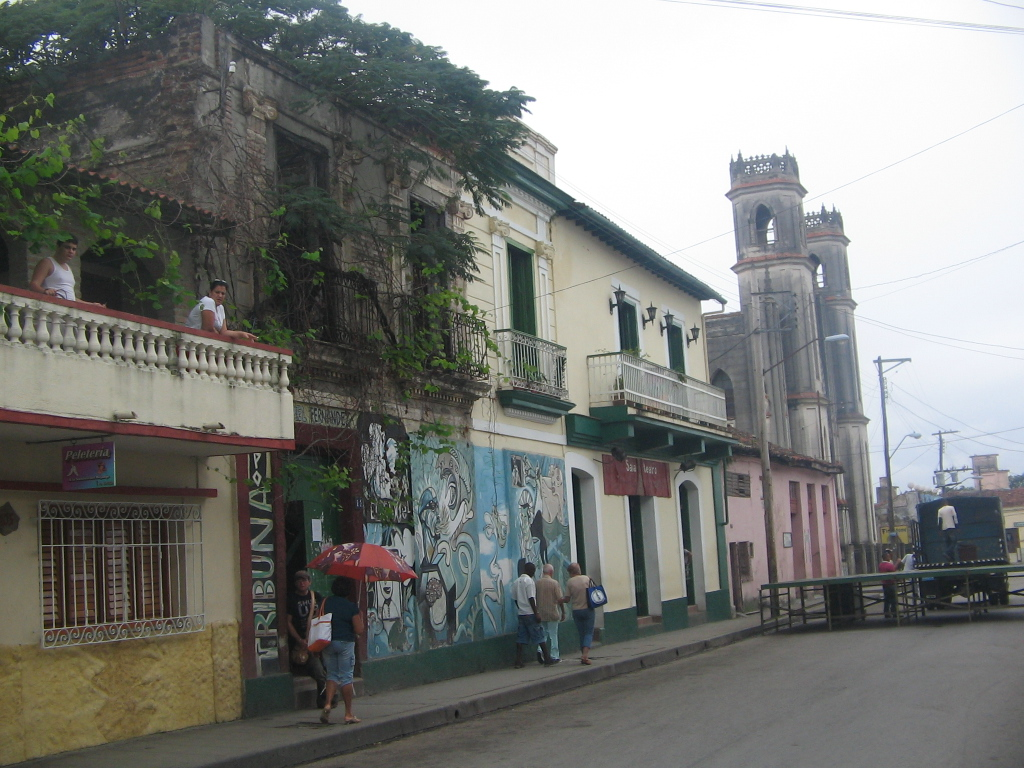
View of El Mejunje with the Cathedral in background

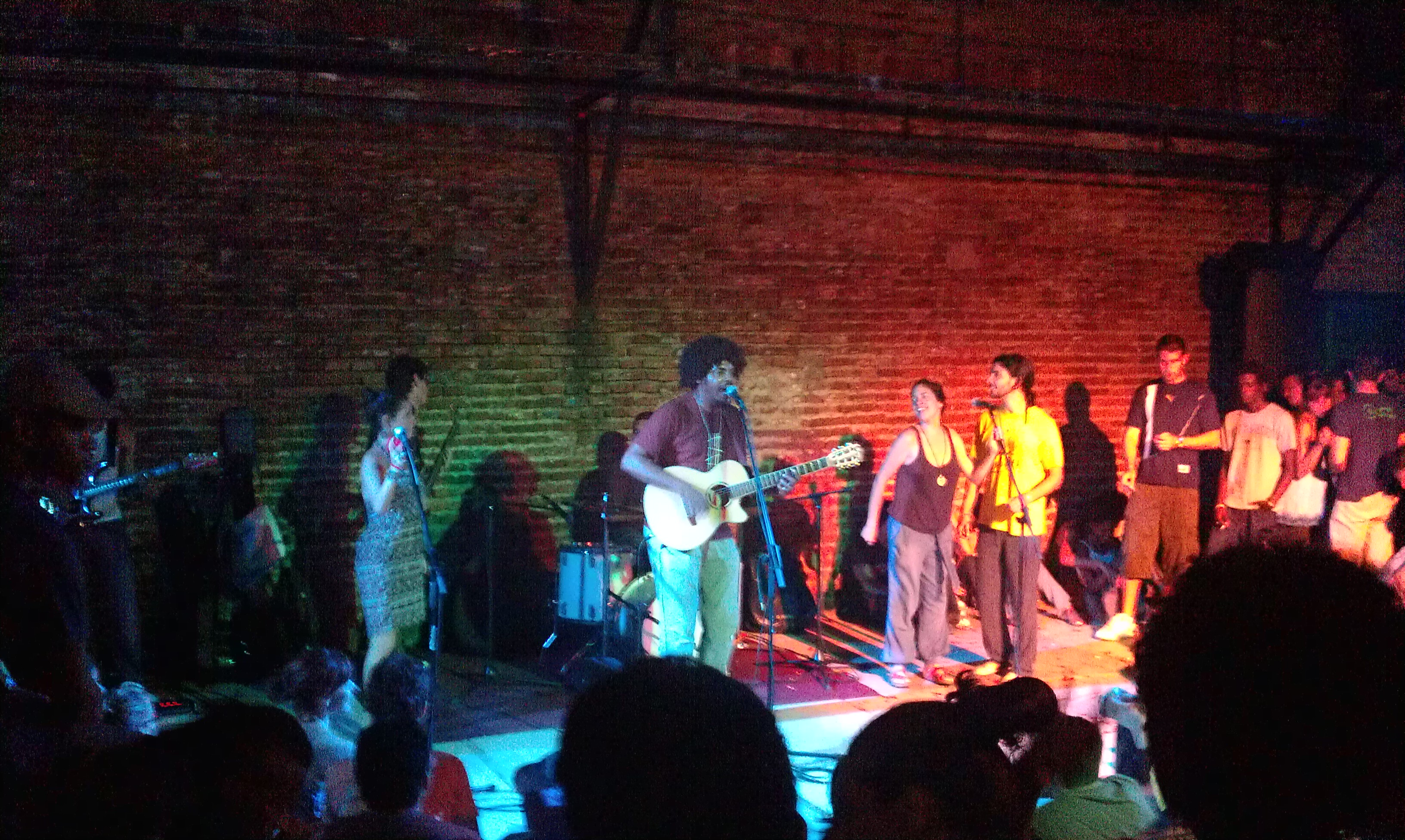
A music concert in the inner open space

== See also ==
- LGBT rights in Cuba
- Ediciones El Puente
- Cuban National Center for Sex Education (CENESEX)
- Circuba
