= Teatro La Caridad =

Theatre in Cuba

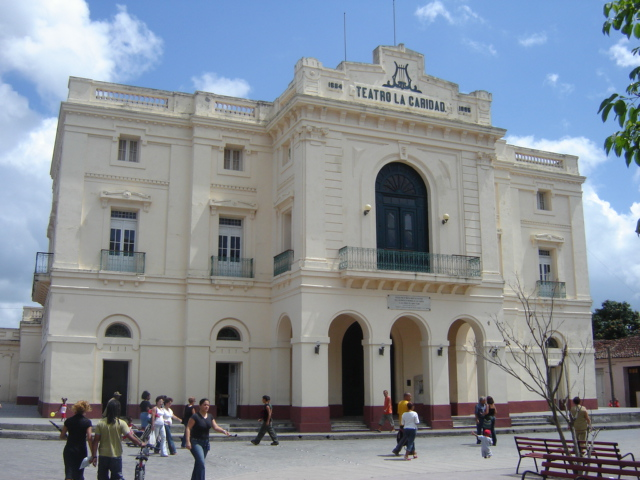
- Theater as of 2007, streets around Vidal Park are closed to cars to preserve the environment
- Interactive map of Teatro La Caridad
- Address: Calle Marta Abreu, Parque Vidal; Santa Clara; Cuba
- Coordinates: 22°24′26.72″N 79°57′57.14″W
- Designation: National Monument of Cuba

Construction
- Opened: 8 September 1885

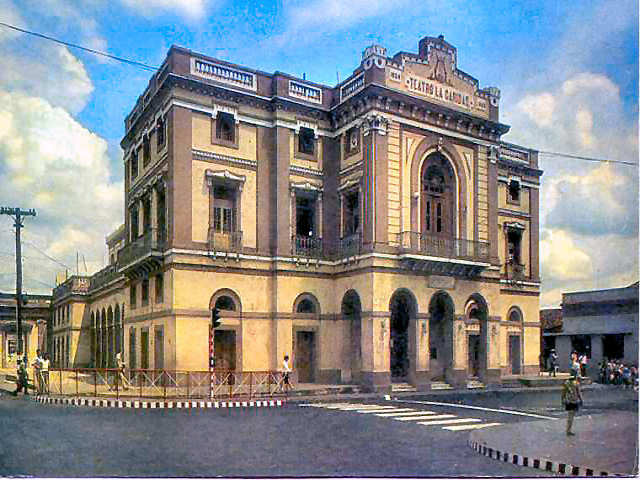
Back in the 1970s with a more colorful facade and when streets around were open to transit.

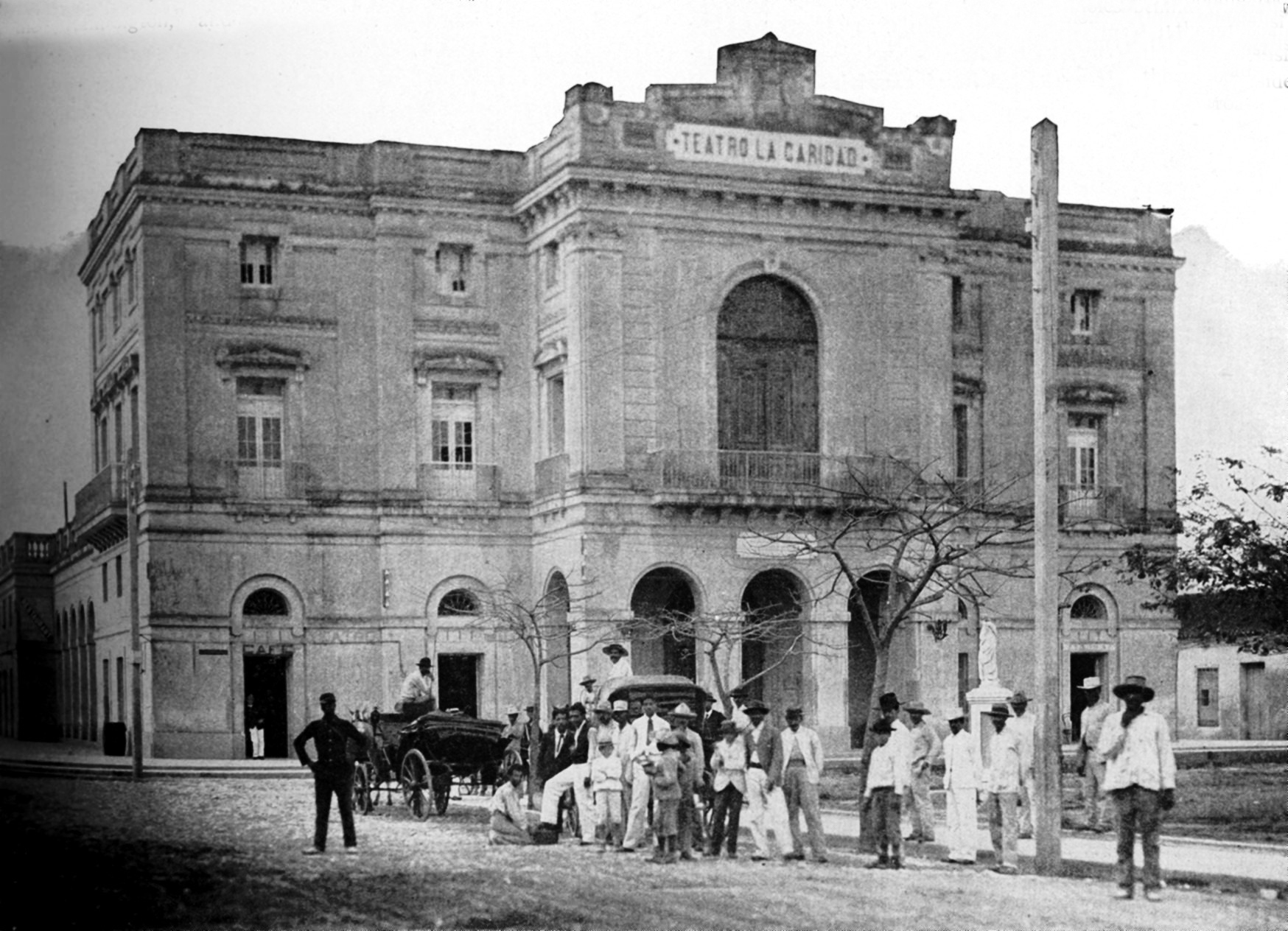
Historical photo of the La Caridad Theater shot on 1899.

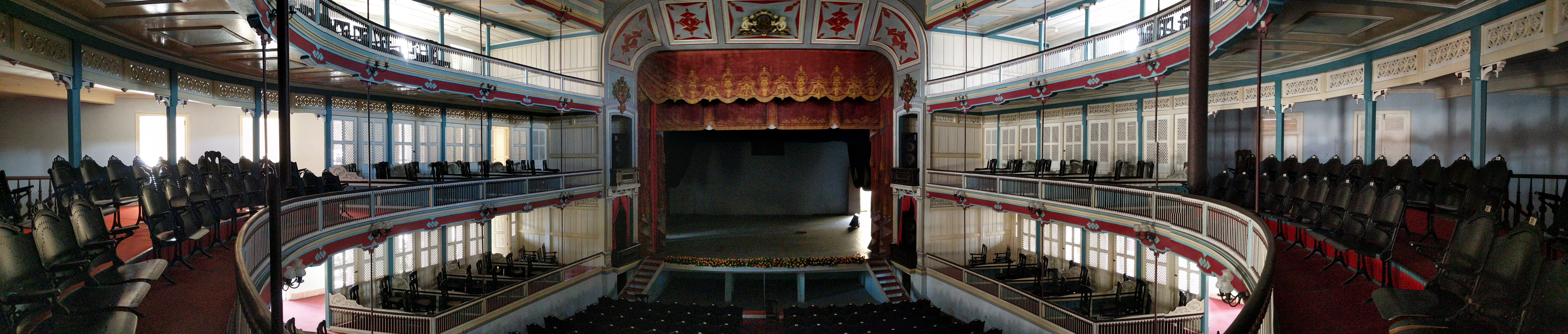
Panoramic view of the stage

Teatro de La Caridad or Teatro La Caridad (Spanish for "Theater of Charity"), located in Santa Clara, is one of the few remaining colonial theatres in Cuba. It is a National Monument of Cuba.

== History ==
=== Early history ===
Teatro de La Caridad was built in 1885 and is one of The Eight Grand Theaters of Cuban Colonial era along with Teatro de la Marina in Santiago de Cuba [1823], Milanes in Pinar del Río [1838], Tacón in Havana [1838], Brunet in Trinidad [1840], Principal in Camagüey [1850], Sauto in Matanzas [1863] and Terry in Cienfuegos [1890].

The theater was financed entirely by Marta Abreu de Estevez, a local philanthropist who contributed to the prosperity of the city, donating resources to many other projects. La Caridad is one of her greatest legacies. Engineer Don Herminio Leiva y Aguilera was in charge of the design of the building. Asked for more functionality Don Herminio came up with a structure with an auditorium for 500+ observers, a mini concert room, cafeteria, restaurant, barbershop and a dancing room. The theatre has quite a sober exterior, but it is the engineering solution for new angles of the roof, the amount of windows and doors for better air flow and the interior decoration that stands up.

Decorations were made by Cuban painter and sculptor Miguel Melero, Spanish Miguel Arias and Philippine-Cuban Camilo Salaya, who later also decorated the Terry Theater in Cienfuegos province, the last of The Eight Grand Theaters. The fresco on the main ceiling depicts Genius, History, Fame, Tragedy and Comedy. The floor and sculptures in the lobby are of white English marble. Ironworks and chairs were imported form America.

September 8, 1885, was inauguration night with many festivities and finalizing with the play "Los lazos de familia" (Family bonds). All local society was present and a formal invitation to the Governor General of the island was issued for the occasion as well. Next morning thankful citizens of Santa Clara took Marta Abreu to the function in a chariot over a carpet of flowers, after that she gave away her theater to the City Council as planned and together they administrated it and saw that part of the money always went to local charities. During the next 75 years the place was changed several times in detriment of the original design. The last restoration of the structure took place in 1964 when most of the original splendor was recovered but after that more than 4 decades has passed and today the facility is in a much needed restoration again. Unfortunately local authorities lack the necessary funds to make this task possible. The theater was closed to public functions in 2007 when a loud sound in the roof alerted the personnel. In further inspections corroded centuries old timbers were detected in the roof, but it was repaired and it is opened again.

=== Recent history ===
La Caridad Theater is one of the most famous gems from the colonial times in rural Cuba. Its stage has seen world famous figures like Enrico Caruso. It was declared a National Monument in 1999 along with the rest of the architectonic environment of Parque Vidal. It is the headquarters of the "Compania Danza Abierta" (Open Dance Company), "Orquesta Sinfonica Provincial" (Provincial Symphonic Orchestra) and "Banda de Conciertos de Santa Clara" (Santa Clara Concert Band).

== Literature ==
- Cristobal Garcia, Angel - El teatro La Caridad. (Colección Escambray, Publicigraf®, 1993)

== See also ==
- Parque Vidal
- El Mejunje
- Catedral de Santa Clara de Asís
- Circuba
