= Cathedral of San Rosendo (Pinar del Río) =

Cathedral in Pinal del Rio, Cuba

Coordinates: 22°24′49″N 83°41′49″W

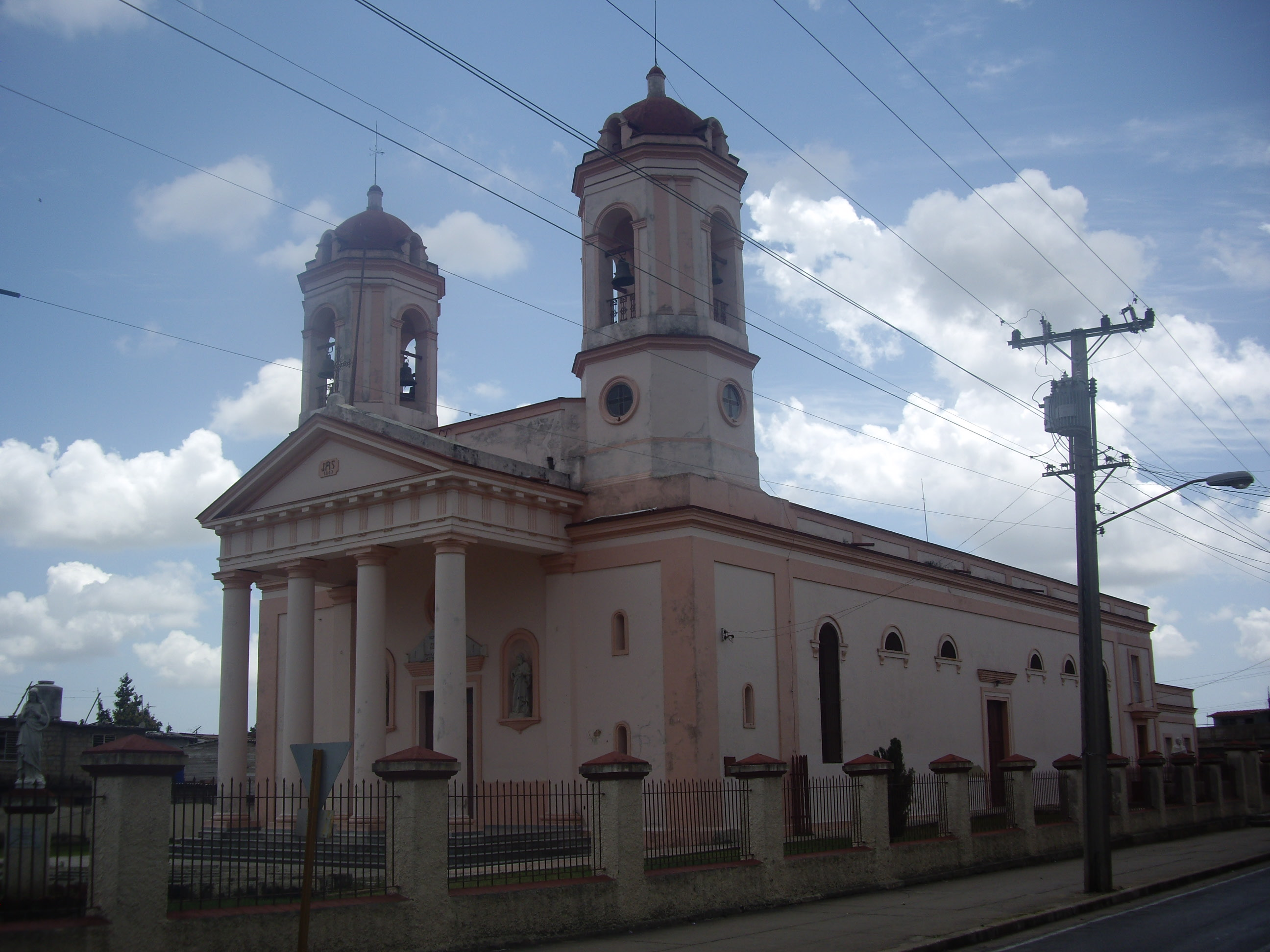

Religion
- Affiliation: Roman Catholicism

Location
- Location: Avenida Maceo Este nº3, entre Recreo y Virtudes, Pinar del Río
- Country: Cuba

The Cathedral of San Rosendo or better known as the Cathedral of Pinar del Río is the seat of the bishop of Diocese of Pinar del Río, a city on the Caribbean island of Cuba.

== See also ==
- Catholic Church in Cuba
- Architecture of cathedrals and great churches
- Catholicism
- Catedral de Santa Clara de Asís
- Havana Cathedral
- Matanzas Cathedral
