= Marta Abreu =

Cuban patriot and philanthropist (1845–1909)

Patroness of Cuba Marta Abreu
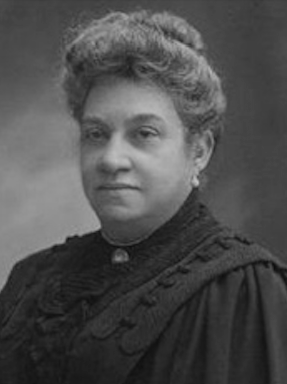

2nd Lady of Cuba
- In office 20 May 1902 – 31 March 1905
- President: Tomás Estrada Palma
- Vice President: Luis Estévez y Romero
- Succeeded by: María de los Ángeles Chaple de Méndez Capote

Personal details
- Born: 13 November 1845 Santa Clara, Cuba
- Died: 2 January 1909 (aged 63) Paris
- Resting place: Christopher Columbus Necropolis
- Spouse: Luis Estévez y Romero
- Relatives: Sister: Rosalía Abreu
- Known for: Largest single financial supporter of the Cuban War of Independence; Co-creator of the Cuban flag; Major philanthropic donations in Santa Clara and Havana
- Nicknames: Jimaguayú; La Generosa; Ignacio Agramonte

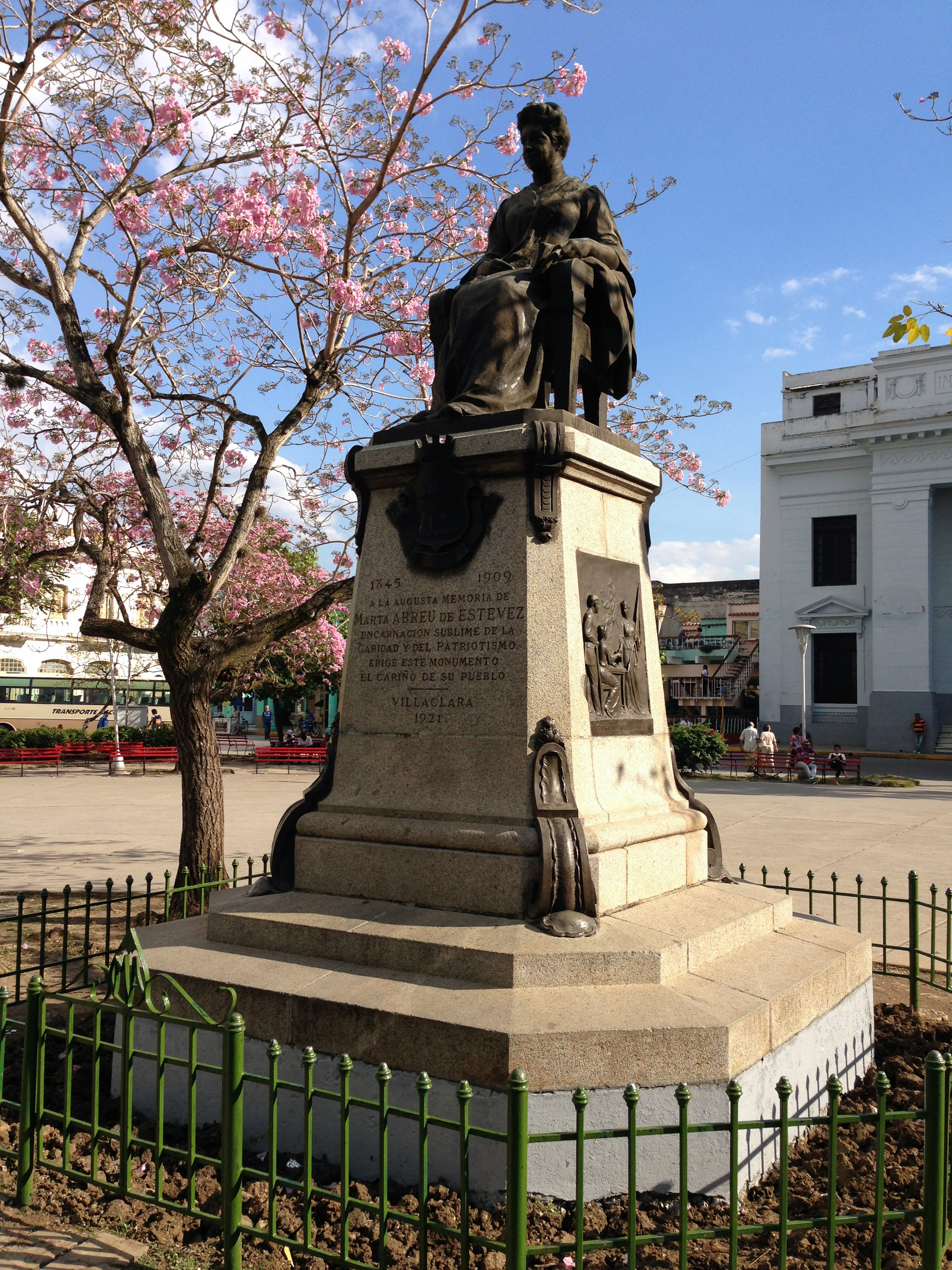
Statue of Marta Abreu in Parque Vidal

Doña Marta de los Ángeles González Abreu y Arencibia (13 November 1845 – 2 January 1909) was a Cuban philanthropist and one of the most influential figures of her time in central Cuba. She is recognized for her extensive charitable works in her hometown of Santa Clara, as well as her substantial financial contributions to the Cuban independence movement against Spanish colonial rule. Abreu is partly responsible for the creation of the Lone Star flag of the Republic of Cuba, referred to as the Narciso López flag. Being the single-largest financial supporter of the Mambises and the Mambí Army, Abreu was named the "Patroness of Cuba."

== Early life and philanthropic works ==
Born in Santa Clara, Cuba, Marta Abreu was the daughter of Don Pedro Abreu and Rosalía Arencibia, members of a wealthy and influential family, the Viscount of Los Remedios. Her father, Pedro Abreu, inherited and expanded a significant fortune.

Her wealth enabled Marta Abreu to travel to Europe and the United States from a very young age, which brought her into contact with key figures of her time and allowed her to appreciate the differences between most developed countries and her own, and how difficult Cubans had it, specially in small hinterland cities and towns.

When Marta was 29 years old, the family to moved to Havana, where Marta was educated in a privileged environment. Don Pedro Abreu purchased a luxurious residence in Havana located in the Paseo del Prado, house number 72.

At the family's housewarming party, Abreu met a younger man named Luis Estévez y Romero, a lawyer and University professor from Matanzas, who was also a strong advocate of the Cuban independence cause. Their relationship blossomed, but because Estévez Romero was from a lower societal class, whose father died when he was young, Abreu's parents did not approve of the relationship.

Abreu and Estévez Romero eloped in Santa Clara. Estévez Romero supported Abreu to achieve her vision for a better Cuba.

On 31 January 1882, when her father, Don Pedro Abreu, died, he helped create the Colegio San Pedro Nolasco, a school for impoverished children, with a generous donation of twenty thousand pesos in his will. Marta and her two sisters, Rosa and Rosalía, donated further funds to help create the school. That evening, Abreu and her husband agreed to move the school into the home built by her father, because it had more space for both classrooms and activities.

While Abreu and her husband were taking care of her father's funeral, and securing his last wishes, they stayed in the house on Sancti Spíritus Street where Marta Abreu was born. During this visit, Abreu's husband proposed the idea of using the property for charitable purposes. Marta Abreu promptly agreed and decided to establish a school for children of color in the city. However, upon determining that the house was unsuitable for this purpose, they arranged for the school to be set up elsewhere, with its expenses covered by rental income from that property and other houses they owned on the same street. Shortly thereafter, from Havana, Marta Abreu personally directed the establishment of the school on San Agustín Street. The institution, named "The Trinity," was placed under the direction of Agustín Jóver.

Several months later, in October 1882, Marta Abreu's mother, Rosalía Arencibia, died. In her will, she stipulated, as her husband had before her, that twenty thousand pesos be allocated for the establishment of a school for impoverished girls. This sum was significantly increased to ninety thousand pesos, as Marta and her two sisters collectively decided to contribute additional funds. The donation was used to construct a school for girls, named Santa Rosalía, and to ensure its ongoing maintenance, as well as that of the Colegio San Pedro Nolasco. Additionally, the building previously occupied by the latter was repurposed into a nursing home, which was named San Pedro y Santa Rosalía.

Another of her notable contributions was La Caridad Theater, built in 1885 to generate revenue for charitable institutions, and later became a cultural landmark in Santa Clara.

In 1887, she financed the construction of public laundry facilities to provide safer and more sanitary working conditions for laundresses, who had previously been washing clothes on the riverbank. Her efforts to modernize Santa Clara also included introducing an electric lighting system in 1895, significantly improving the city's infrastructure. The same year, she established El Amparo Dispensary, a medical facility providing free healthcare services to the poor.

== Cuban War of Independence (1895–1899) ==
=== Paris (1895–1898) ===
With the outbreak of the Cuban War of Independence in 1895, Marta Abreu and her husband decided to go into exile in Paris, often referred to as the "cradle of liberty," where they would actively support the revolutionary cause. They departed for France on June 16, 1895. Upon arriving in Paris, they quickly established connections with Cuban revolutionaries working to support the war effort. Among their influential associates was the Puerto Rican physician Ramón Emeterio Betances, a prominent Antillean figure who represented Cuban interests in the French capital.

By December 1895, Marta Abreu and her husband Luis Estévez were actively engaged in supporting Cuban independence. That same year, Marta began making significant and strategically crucial financial contributions to the revolutionary cause. The historical consensus is that just as Martí's ideological vision, Gómez's military leadership, and Maceo's formidable combat skills were essential to securing victory, so too were the substantial monetary donations that fueled the war effort.

Through financial donations and political advocacy, she became one of the most significant benefactors of the Cuban Liberation Army. Her contributions included large monetary transfers to the Cuban Revolutionary Party, led by Tomás Estrada Palma, as well as financial support for arms procurement and war logistics. She also provided humanitarian aid to reconcentrados, Cubans displaced by Spanish military policies, and funded pro-independence publications and diplomatic efforts.

On 14 January 1896, from Paris, Marta Abreu sent a transfer of $3,000 to Tomás Estrada Palma, the delegate of the Cuban Revolutionary Party. To maintain discretion, the donation was sent under the symbolic name of Ignacio Agramonte, who had died during the Ten Years War. Over the course of that year, she continued her financial support for the Cuban forces. On 26 February, she sent two additional transfers—one of $4,000 in her own name and another of $1,000 under the pseudonym "Jimaguayú," attributed to her son, Pedrito. On 1 April, she contributed another $4,000. Later that month, on the French coast, General Rafael Cabrera led a commission under the direction of Tomás Estrada Palma to collect funds for the war effort among Cuban expatriates living in France.

Upon learning of General Rafael Cabrera's mission to collect funds for the Cuban war effort, Marta Abreu immediately signed a check for fifty thousand francs. Before General Cabrera departed from Paris, Marta and her husband, Luis Estévez, hosted a farewell luncheon in his honor, which was also attended by the esteemed Cuban intellectual Carlos de la Torre.

In 1897, reports of General Antonio Maceo's death began circulating in Paris. If true, it would deal a severe blow to the Cuban independence movement. Deeply concerned, Marta Abreu promptly sent a telegram to Tomás Estrada Palma, stating: "Confirm if the devastating news is true. Count on ten thousand pesos. Go forward."

That same day, 9 January, she dispatched $1,000 under the pseudonym "Jimaguayú." In addition to the promised ten thousand pesos for Estrada Palma, she contributed an additional thirty thousand pesos that day.

Later that year, in September, upon hearing of the failure of an expedition bound for the coast of Pinar del Río, she sent another ten thousand pesos to support the cause. On 1 January 1898, she transferred another ten thousand pesos to Estrada Palma, followed by a personal delivery of funds through General Eugenio Sánchez Agramonte on 12 February. She continued her financial support with additional transfers, sending $4,000 on 17 May and another $6,000 shortly thereafter.

During the brutal reconcentration policy imposed by Spanish General Valeriano Weyler, which forced thousands of Cubans into starvation and disease-ridden camps, Marta Abreu sent large sums of money to Father Chao, a Catholic parish priest in Villa Clara, to aid the suffering population.

=== United States (1898–1899) ===
After several years in exile in Paris, Marta, Luis, and their son Pedrito Estévez Abreu arrived in New York on 18 June 1898. There, they held extensive meetings with Estrada Palma and other key Cuban leaders. They spent much of their time in Philadelphia, and on 10 October 1898, Marta sent $5,000 to Estrada Palma to be used for food and clothing for the mambises, the Cuban independence fighters. Their son also got married on this trip to Catalina Lasa.

== Return to Cuba (1899–1906) ==
After Cuba gained independence, Marta Abreu returned to Havana with her family in 1899. Their stately residence at Prado 72 soon became a gathering place for many of the most distinguished figures of the Cuban Revolution, including Generalissimo Máximo Gómez. Her contributions to the war effort were widely acknowledged by leaders such as Generalísimo Máximo Gómez and Tomás Estrada Palma. During an intimate meal hosted by Marta and her husband, Estévez Romero, for the esteemed Dominican military leader, a young aide from Villa Clara named Agustín asked Gómez about his opinion of Marta Abreu. The Generalísimo responded with deep admiration;

"You, Villaclareños—indeed, all Cubans—do not fully understand the true value of this lady. The one who knows it best is Don Tomás Estrada Palma. Go and ask him what patriotic significance the illustrious Marta holds. If she were to be granted a rank in the Liberation Army in recognition of her generosity, I dare say it would not have been difficult for her to receive the very same rank that I hold."

Under the Military Government of Cuba, her husband, Luis Estévez y Romero, was named the Secretary of Justice for the Provisional Governor of Cuba, Leonard Wood. Later, Estévez Romero became the first Vice President of the newly established Republic of Cuba.

== Second period of exile and death (1906–1909) ==
Estévez Romero served as vice president until he and his wife, Marta, grew concerned that the Estrada Palma administration was steering the young Republic in a direction that threatened its stability. Although they believed in Estrada Palma's good intentions, they felt compelled to distance themselves from his government. During this period, Marta and Luis spent much of their time at their San Francisco sugar mill near Cruces, only traveling to Havana occasionally to offer counsel to the president and express their hopes for the nation's future. Eventually, Luis Estévez chose to resign from his position as vice president.

On 31 March 1905, in moral opposition to Estrada Palma's attempts at re-election, especially what he believed to be Estrada Palma's subservient attitude to the Platt amendment and US involvement in Cuba, he tendered his official resignation. In June 1905, the family returned to Paris.

By December 1908, Marta's longstanding stomach ailments worsened, prompting doctors to recommend surgery. Diagnosed with appendicitis, she underwent an operation, but complications arose, leading to sepsis.

On 2 January 1909, Abreu died after complications from an appendicitis operation, and was buried at Cimetière du Nord. Estévez brought flowers to his wife's grave every morning, very carefully arranging them in the marble flower pot next to her headstone. Overcome with grief, Estévez took his own life by firearm on 4 February 1909.

== Monuments ==
- Teatro La Caridad (Charity Theater), which she built and donated to the city in order to collect money for further donations.
- Asilo de Ancianos, old people's home.
- Asilo San Vicente de Paul, to house the poor and homeless.
- El Amparo (The Shelter), another shelter for poor people.
- El Gran Cervantes, school for black children.
- Buen Viaje school.
- San Pedro Nolasco school.
- Santa Rosalía school.
- Santa Clara weather station, which she donated with all the instruments and scientific material.
- Santa Clara firefighters' quarters.
- Santa Clara electrical power plant.
- Santa Clara train station.
- Villa Clara province gas plant.
- Three public laundry stations by the Bélico river.
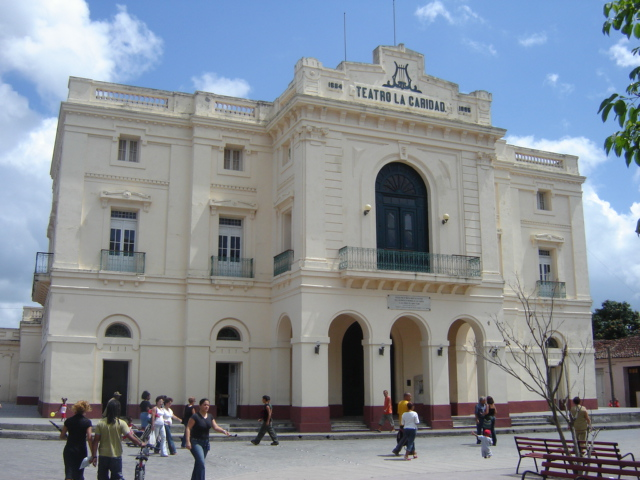
Marta Abreu's most outstanding donation, Teatro La Caridad.

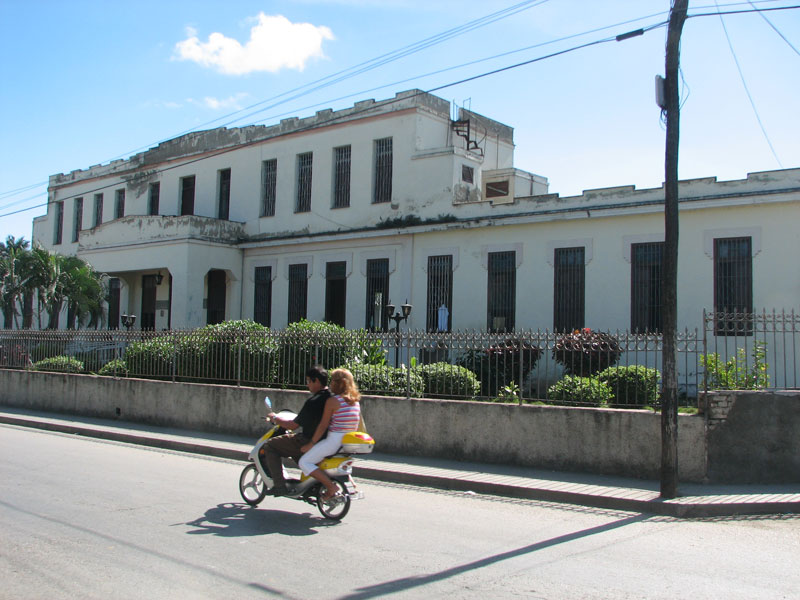
Old people's home.

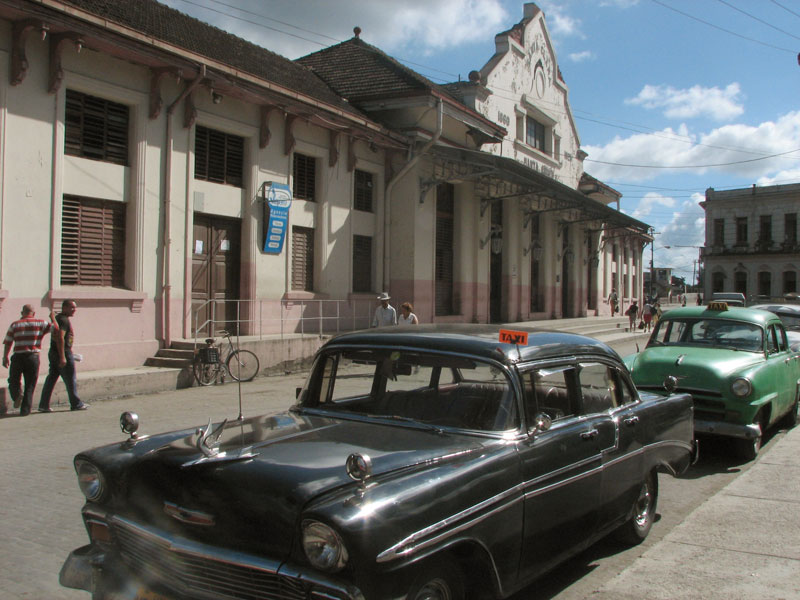
Train station.

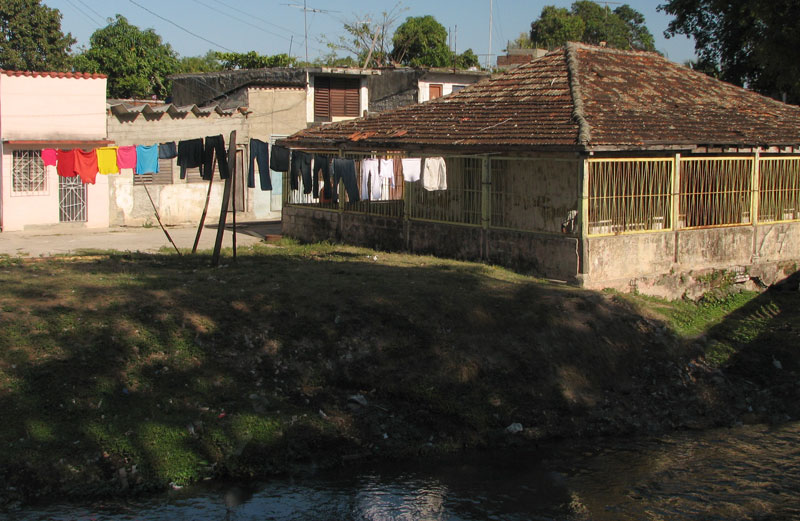
Public laundry station at the Bélico river.

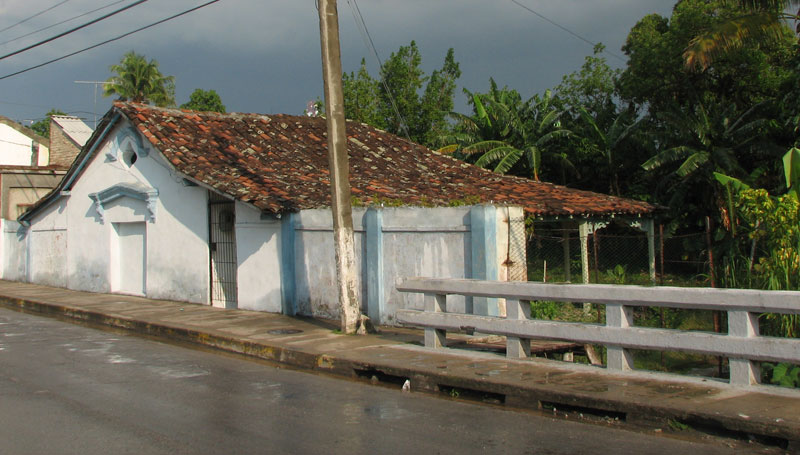
Another public laundry station (now a theater).

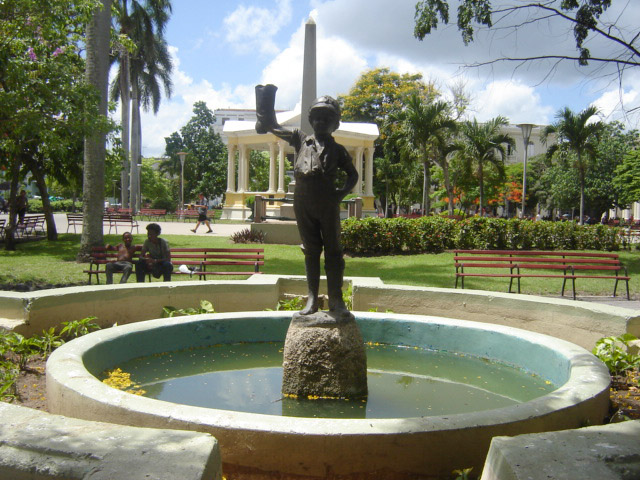
Obelisk in Parque Vidal donated by Abreu (behind the fountain statue of boy with a boot).

== Memorials ==
- Santa Clara's University was named after her.
- Bronze statue in Parque Vidal.
- A room is dedicated to her in Casa de la Ciudad house-museum and art gallery.
- In 1947 Cuba published four stamps celebrating the centenary of her birth.

== Bibliography ==
- Cristobal Garcia, Angel. El teatro La Caridad. Colección Escambray, Publicigraf, 1993
- "Monument to Marta Abreu", Webshots.com
