= Scanlan Fountain =

Fountain in Houston, Texas, U.S.

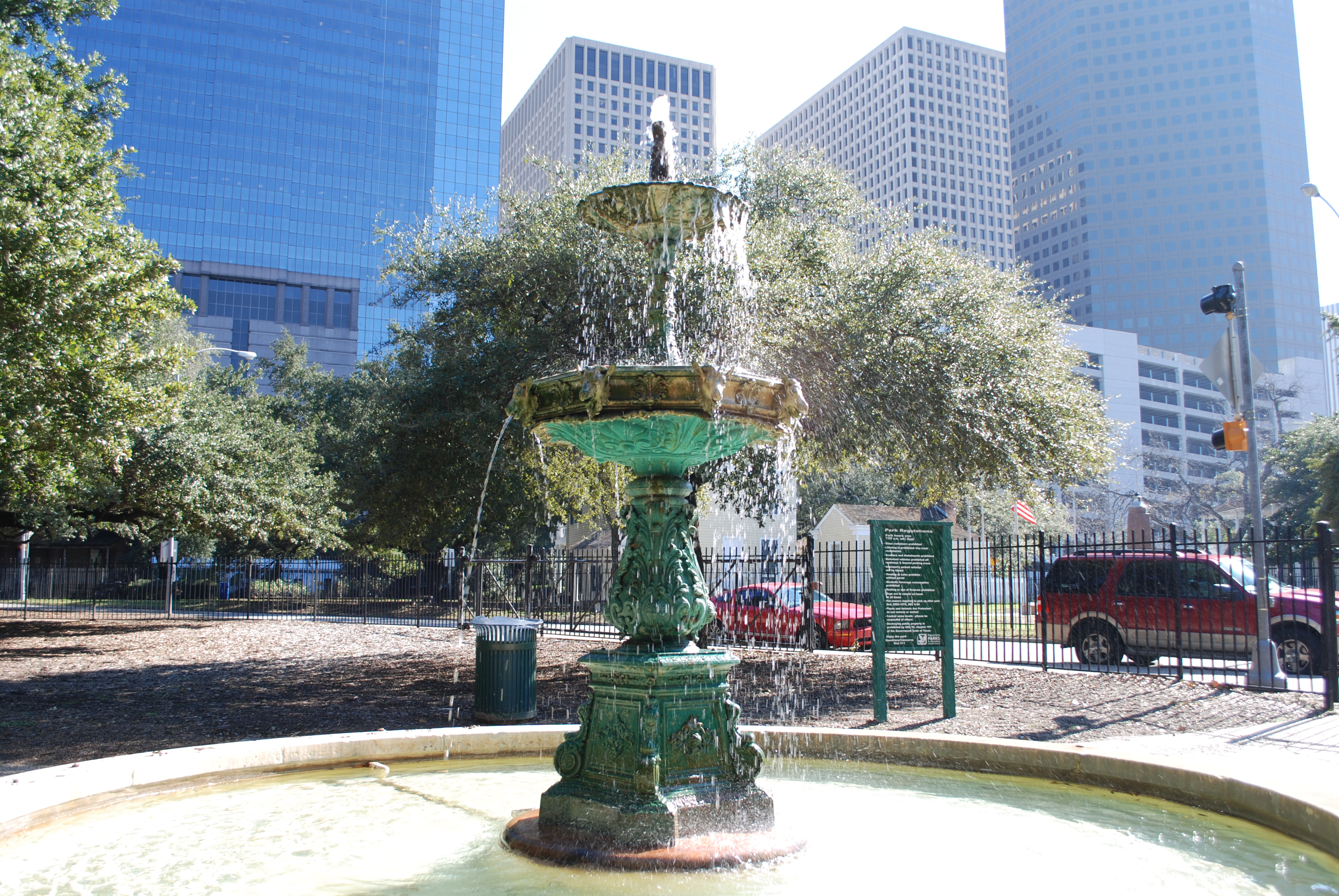
- The fountain in 2013
- Location: Houston, Texas, United States; 29.75976°N 95.37224°W

Scanlan Fountain is an 1891 cast iron fountain, installed in Houston's Sam Houston Park, in the U.S. state of Texas. The fountain was installed in the park in 1972. It was cast by J. L. Mott Iron Works c. 1880 and held by a private individual before being donated to the city by the family of the owner.

== See also ==
- List of public art in Houston
