= The Boy with the Leaking Boot =

Various bronze statues since the late 19th century

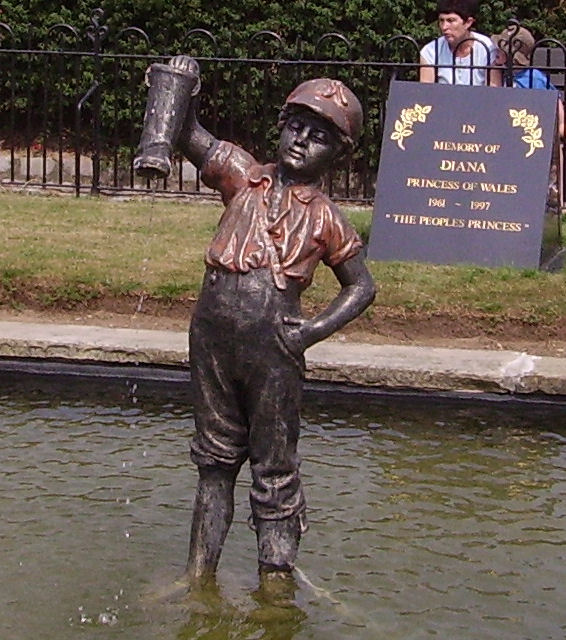
Statue in Cleethorpes, England

The Boy with the Leaking Boot is a statue showing a young boy, with a bare right foot, holding up his right boot and looking at it. The statue is about 4 feet (1.2 m) tall, and in many cases forms a fountain, with water emerging from the toe of the boot. There are at least 24, and reportedly "hundreds" of examples. The origin of the statue is thought to be an Italian design sold to an American manufacturer. There are several theories claiming that the boy is a young Italian newspaper seller who drowned, or, less likely given the original design, an American army drummer-boy who carried water in his leaking boot to help fallen comrades, or a young fire-fighter either using his boot in a bucket chain or emptying his boot after an incident, or possibly none of these. The statue has also been called The Boy with the Leaky Boot, Boy Immigrant and Unfortunate Boot.

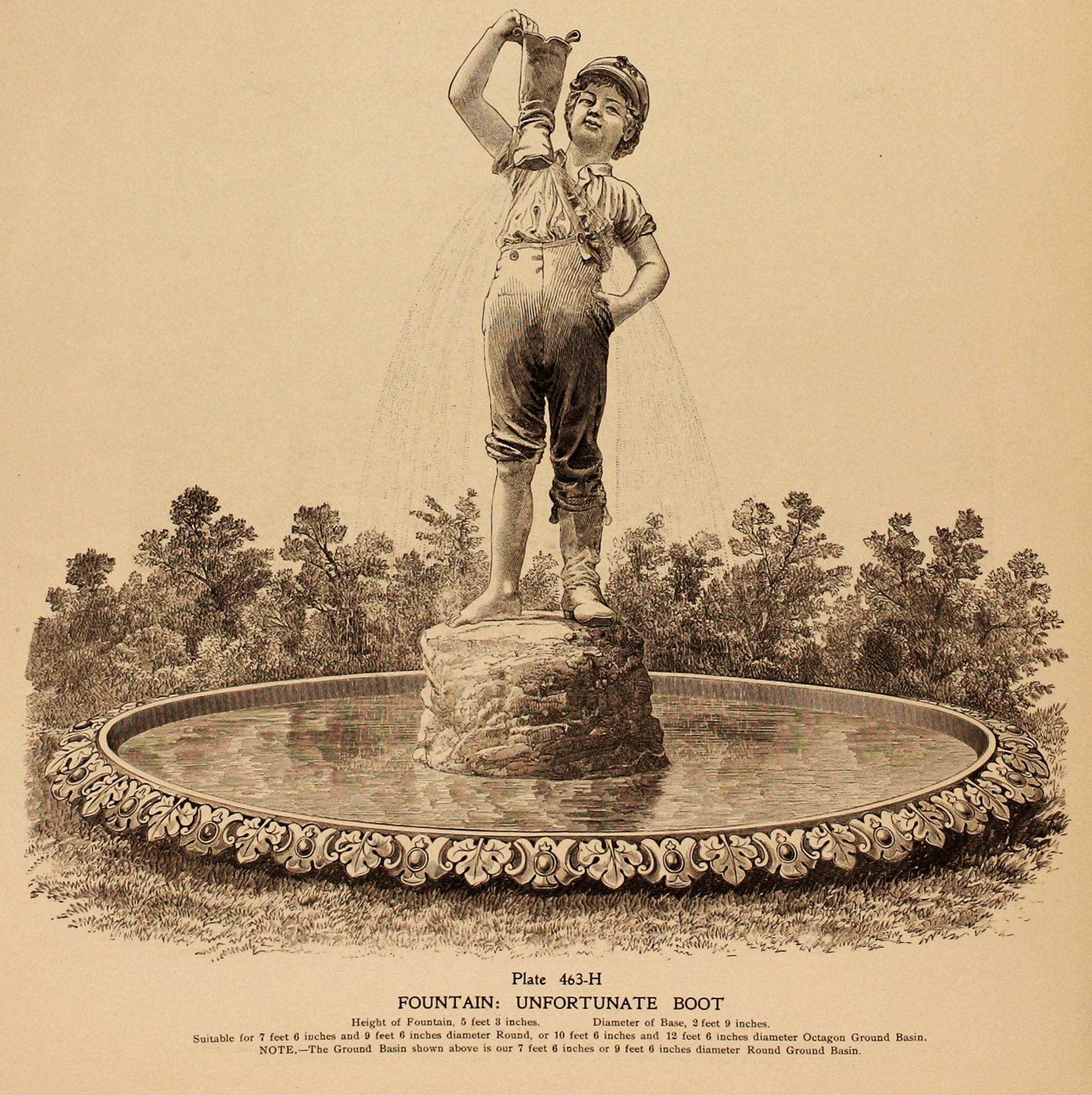
Original historic print on the J. L. Mott Iron Works 1925's fountain's Catalog used by Santa Clara council (Cuba) when they selected the fountain for the city's main square.

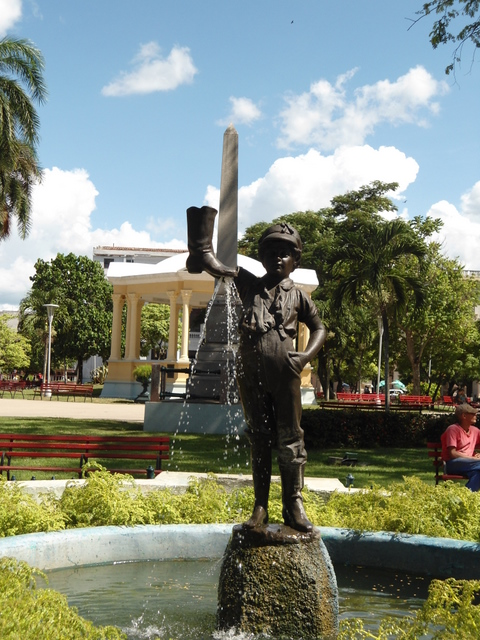
The statue in Parque Vidal, Santa Clara, Cuba

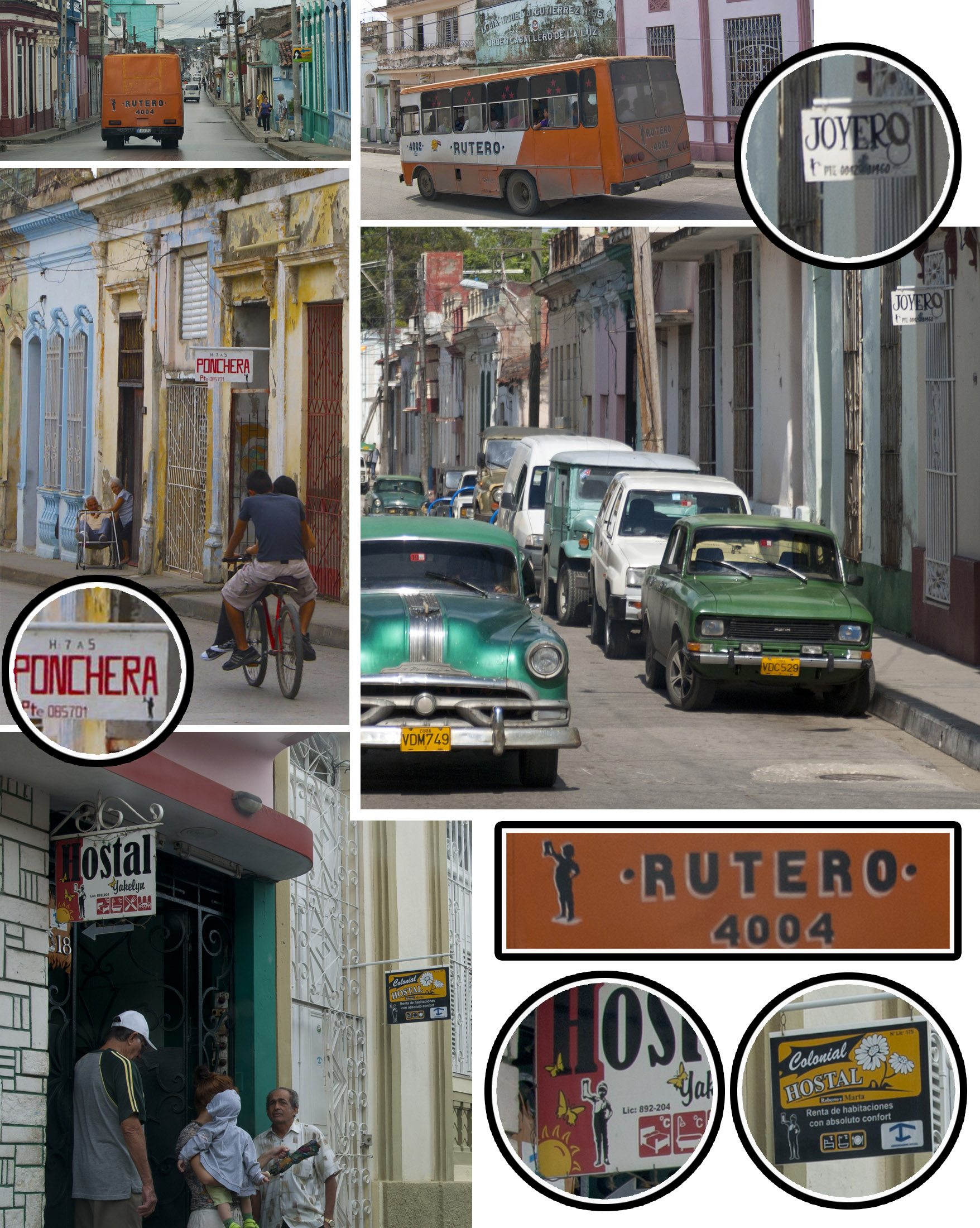
Collage. Silhouette of the Boy used as symbol of public services in Santa Clara city, Cuba

== Statues in the United States ==
Among the earliest statues is that in Sandusky, Ohio, where it stood in front of the Porter House hotel on the shore of Lake Erie. The original zinc statue was brought from Germany in 1876 by a prominent local couple, Mr and Mrs Voltaire Scott. After cyclone damage and several incidents of vandalism, the statue was moved to the lobby of the local City Hall, and a replacement bronze was installed in a fountain in Washington Park.

In Helena, Montana, a statue stood in front of the "Natatorium", built in 1889 and housing the then-largest indoor plunge pool in the world, as part of the Broadwater Hotel complex. The statue is now in the former First National Bank Building on Last Chance Gulch in the town.

One of the statues was erected in Courthouse Park in Fresno, California, in 1895. It was a drinking fountain, funded by public subscription organised by Sergeant Nichols of the Salvation Army. Tin cups hung from the statue, and the pipes were cooled by blocks of ice. The statue was purchased from the J. L. Mott Iron Works of New York. The statue was moved, vandalised and repaired on various occasions, recast in bronze in 1947, and again recast in 1995. It is currently in the Fresno County Plaza on Tulare Street.

The statue erected in 1895 in Stevens Point, Wisconsin, had a similarly chequered existence, being damaged by a horse-drawn vehicle in 1910 and thereafter cared for by the local fire department, outside whose station he stood with various incidents of damage and restoration including a major restoration in 1989 after vandalism and subsequent fund-raising, and being decapitated in 1998 (the head was handed in to the police three days later). A concrete casting of the statue was made and erected in 2009. The original statue, restored, was in 2010 still in the possession of the fire department and it was reported that "An idea which seems to be gathering support is to install him in a glass case inside Fire Station #1." A statue of the boy highlights a fountain on Main Street and School Street in Wallingford, Vermont, United States, and has been a centerpiece in the town since 1898, when it was erected in memory of local innkeeper Arnold Young, by his children, with a 10-year interval from 1910 when it disappeared and was later found in the inn's attic. It has been reported locally that the sculptor was Wallingford resident Warren Dunning Haggerty. The statue is described as "the civic symbol of the entire town".

There have been five statues in five different locations in New Orleans since 1898 when the first was erected at the Milliken Children's Hospital of Charity. The boot, all that remained after this statue was vandalised in 1961, is reported to grace the present day hospital administrator's desk. The latest statue stands in a pool at the Children's Hospital.

The village of Ellenville, New York, claims to have three of these statues: a 1997 model in the village's Liberty Square, a statue purchased in 1925 now in the Public Library, and one presumed to date from before 1908 and currently awaiting restoration. This last statue was made by J. L. Mott Iron Works and was erected on the lawn of the house then occupied by Henry Brodhead, who was paymaster for the Mott Iron Works until the company moved from New York to Trenton, New Jersey, in 1908. It was used by sculptor Matt Pozorski when creating the 1997 version. The statue is described as "an important icon of Ellenville".

In Wadsworth, Ohio, a statue was bought in the late 19th century but melted down as scrap metal to contribute to the World War II war effort. In 2014 the town borrowed Sandusky's statue to make a cast for a copy, which now stands in Wadworth.

A statue was erected at High Point Mansion, Hershey, Pennsylvania, then the home of Milton S. Hershey and his wife Catherine, to replace a more energetic fountain which displeased Mrs Hershey by spraying her favourite sitting place when there was a gust of wind. It is now in the Hershey Gardens. As Mrs Hershey died in 1915 this statue must be from that year or earlier.

In Penrose, Colorado, a bronze statue was erected in 1915, presented to the town by Spencer and Julie Penrose. After the common tale of kidnappings and damage, it was presented to Penrose School in 2005 and is kept there in a display case. It is the property of the Senior Citizens of Penrose.

A well maintained statue with eight working drinking fountains can be seen in Houlton, Maine, in Pierce Park. It was purchased in 1916 after Mrs Clara P. Frisbie left the city $1000 to beautify the park. The statue is featured in the flash introduction of the city website home page.

A statue was given to the town of Wausau, Wisconsin "before 1925" by Sue Hammond Rae, and was displayed in the town's Hammond Park until 1980 when it was vandalised and removed. After restoration, it stood in the town's Wausau Center mall from its opening day on August 3, 1983, until the mall was closed and demolished in 2021. As of December 2024 the plan was to relocate the statue to the corner of Third and Jackson Streets in warm weather and keep it indoors in winter for protection, and it was expected to be displayed first in either 2025 or 2026.

A statue stood in City Hall Park in El Paso, Texas, for 50 years before being moved to San Jacinto Plaza in the 1950s. There it was protected by a moat containing alligators. In 1995 it was in El Paso City Hall.

A statue was acquired by Baker County, Oregon, about 1908 when the county courthouse was built. The "boy" was the center of the fountain in front of the courthouse where he stood with his leaking boot as four lion heads spewed water toward him from the four corners of the fountain. After several repairs due to vandalism he was brought inside the courthouse and finally encased 9 June 1975.

Further statues have been reported to exist in the United States at Salida, Colorado (at the Heart of the Rockies Regional Medical Center), and Council Bluffs, Iowa. In 1975 there were also reported to be statues in Menominee, Michigan, and El Dorado, Kansas.

== Statues in Canada ==
A statue in Assiniboine Park, Winnipeg, Manitoba, was originally donated to the city by the Young Peoples' Christian Endeavour Society and the Trades and Labour Council in honour of Queen Victoria's golden jubilee in 1897. It formed part of a fountain outside the old city hall, and was moved to the park in 1953 with funding from Order of Rotary International Fellowship.

Another statue is on Bernard Street in Montreal.

In 1975 it was reported that there were also statues in Toronto and in London, Ontario.

== Statues in the United Kingdom ==
A statue was given to the town of Cleethorpes, North East Lincolnshire, in 1918 by John Carlbom or Calborn. It is reported that he was a Swedish immigrant to Cleethorpes who had built up a successful shipping business and was the Swedish Vice-Consul, and that the statue was a copy of one in the Hasselbacken Restaurant in Stockholm, Sweden. The Cleethorpes statue now stands in a pond in the Diana Princess of Wales Memorial Gardens, on Kingsway. It was stolen and replaced in 2002 and 2008, and vandalised in October 2011. In July 2012, two youths were recorded on CCTV as they frolicked naked in the pond and destroyed the fountain. A replacement statue was made by a local garden ornaments manufacturer and installed with improved security in September 2012. A nearby pub was named The Leaking Boot, but was destroyed by fire in June 2009.

== Statues in Cuba ==
In 1925 a statue was erected in Cuba in the Parque Vidal of Santa Clara, bought from J. L. Mott of New York by Colonel Francisco López Leiva. where it has become a city symbol. It is known as the Boy with the Unfortunate Boot. At some point it was damaged, and it was replaced in 1970 by a bronze statue. It has been described as "one of the symbols of this city".

== Statues in other locations ==
A 1975 "Letter to the editor" in The County newsletter published in Aroostook County, Maine, home of the Houlton statue, reported that "As of 1975, there have been 26 similar known statues in the United States and abroad", and that there were statues in Stockholm, Sweden, and Caracas, Venezuela.

== Book ==
Mary'n B. Rosson (died 14 November 2002) wrote an article in True West Magazine about the restoration of the El Paso statue. "Letters about Boys in other cities poured in, loaded with Boy information", and she "felt compelled" to write a book about the statue: The Mystery of the Boy With Leaking Boot. It was published in 1997 by The Record-Courier of Baker City, Oregon.
