= J. L. Mott Iron Works =

Defunct American hardware store

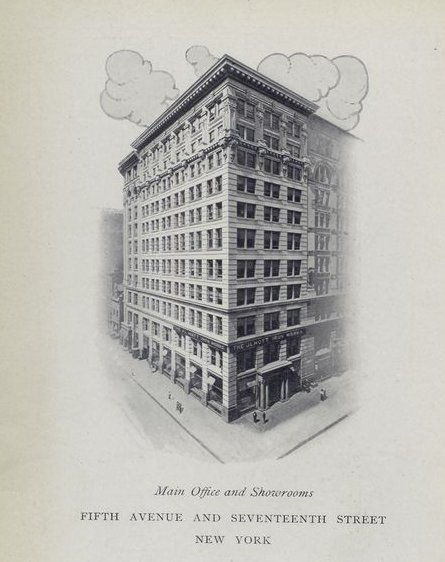

The J. L. Mott Iron Works was an American hardware dealer and manufacturer during the late 19th century. It operated in New York and was relocated to Trenton, New Jersey, where it ceased operations in the 1920s.

== History ==
The J. L. Mott Iron Works was established by Jordan L. Mott in New York City in the area now called Mott Haven in 1828. Mott was previously a grocer but he transitioned to iron works when he invented the first cast iron stoves that could burn anthracite coal. The company would later expand to the manufacture and trading of "Stoves and ranges, hot-air furnaces, parlor grates and fenders, fire irons, cauldrons and kettles, statuary, candelabra, fountains garden seats, vases, iron pipes or every kind, water tanks, &c" are mentioned in Benson John Lossing, History of New York City. Mott was interested in the patenting of inventions, but turned down President Buchanan's offer to make him Commissioner of Patents.

The business was continued by Mott's son, J.L. Mott, Jr. The J. L. Mott Iron Works shop occupied the entire 11 floors of a building shop in Fifth Avenue and Seventeenth Street. An account cited that the basement, first and second floors displayed plumbing and bathroom fixtures. The rest of the upper floors were devoted to hospital, marine, and tile departments as well as the ornamental, heating, and furnaces departments. Plumbing fixtures, including enameled cast iron bathtubs were also a J.L. Mott specialty.

At the Centennial Exposition in Philadelphia, 1876, an elaborate cast iron fountain, 25 feet tall, was exhibited by the company. According to the exposition review, Gems of the Centennial Exposition all of the modeling of architectural forms, basins and figures was completed by artisans of the company. Figures were molded in clay, then cast in plaster to provide the moulds for the cast iron, in a process similar to bronze-founding. The lowest "pan" or basin was ten feet in diameter, said at the time to have been the largest such cast-iron basin in the United States. Some examples of the fountain figure The Boy with the Leaking Boot in various American and Canadian cities were purchased from the company.

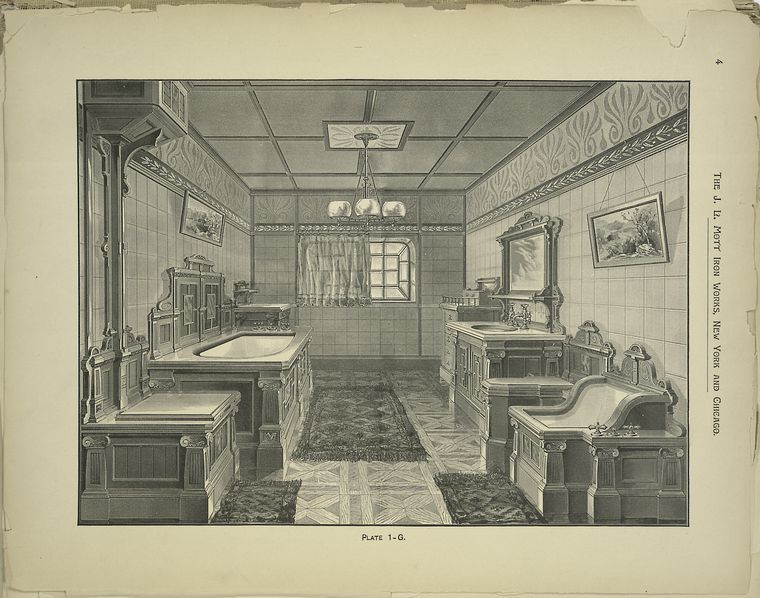

The company relocated in about 1902 to Trenton, New Jersey.

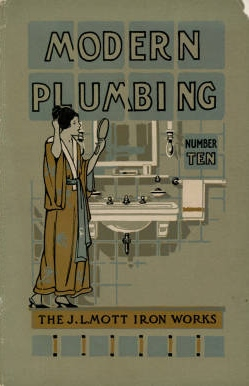
Modern Plumbing - J. L. Mott Iron Works

In 1917, artist Marcel Duchamp may have selected a urinal from the J.L. Mott showroom in Manhattan and presented it as a work of art called Fountain at the Society of Independent Artists exhibition. This episode marks the introduction of the readymade in the history of modern art.

The Mott Iron Works company was established in 1984 in Massachusetts, United States, and has no connection with the earlier company.

== See also ==
- Monumental Bronze Company
- J. W. Fiske & Company
- Scanlan Fountain
