= Luis Estévez y Romero =

First Vice President of the Republic of Cuba

Don Luis Estévez y Romero
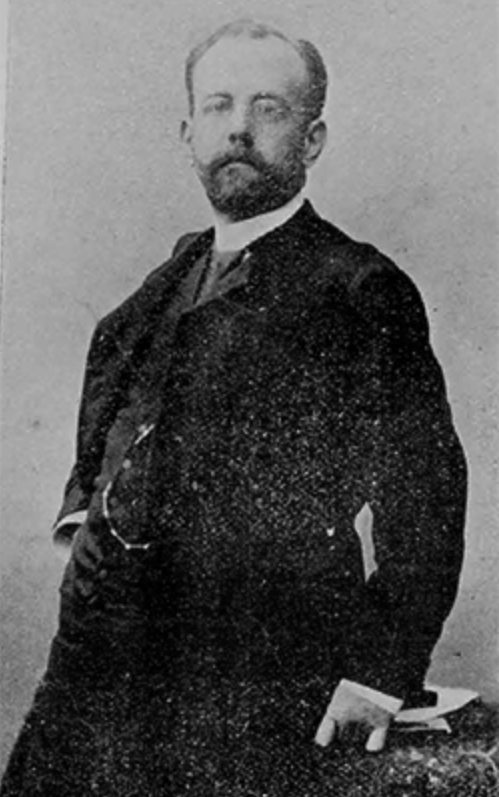

1st Vice President of Cuba
- In office May 20, 1902 – March 31, 1905
- President: Tomás Estrada Palma
- Preceded by: Position established
- Succeeded by: Domingo Méndez Capote

Secretary of Justice for the Military Government of Cuba
- In office 1899–1901
- Provisional Governor: Leonard Wood

Personal details
- Born: October 20, 1849 Matanzas
- Died: February 4, 1909 (Aged 59 years) Paris
- Cause of death: Suicide by gunshot
- Resting place: Christopher Columbus Cemetery
- Party: Cuban National Party
- Other political affiliations: Republican Party of Havana
- Spouse: Marta Abreu
- Awards: Adopted Son of Santa Clara

Don Luis Gonzaga Irene Estévez y Romero was a Cuban lawyer, politician, philosopher, naturalist, and the first Vice President of the Republic of Cuba, during the first term of President Tomás Estrada Palma. He was the husband of the prominent Cuban philanthropist Marta Abreu, the "Patroness of Cuba."

== Early life and legal career ==
Estévez was born in Matanzas, Cuba, to José Torcuato Estévez and Luisa Romero. Coming from a humble background, he lost his father during his teenage years. In 1863, he enrolled at La Empresa School, where he later taught from 1868 to 1869.

In 1866, he graduated with a Bachelor of Arts with high honors and subsequently enrolled at the University of Havana to study medicine. However, he later switched to study law in 1868. He earned his Bachelor of Law degree in 1872, followed by a Licentiate in 1873, and a doctorate in 1878, becoming a Doctor of Civil and Canon Law.

In 1868, Estévez met Marta Abreu, a philanthropist from Santa Clara who was four years his senior. Initially, her parents opposed their relationship due to Estévez's modest means and younger age. However, the couple married in 1874 and had two children: Pedro, born in 1875, and Cecilia, who died in infancy.

Marta Abreu was an exceptionally powerful woman in Cuban society, and most historians write that she was the dominant woman in the relationship, with a dedicated mission to improve the lives of Cubans and lift her country out of its Spanish possession. Estévez settled in Santa Clara, where he actively supported his wife's extensive philanthropic efforts during the 1880s. In most photographs of the couple that appeared in the Cuban press at the time, it was Marta, and not Luis, that appeared in the center of the frame, with Luis sitting or standing somewhere off to the side. In recognition of his contributions, he was declared an Adopted Son of Santa Clara in 1885, and in 1894, a street was named in his honor.

== Cuban War of Independence, exile in Paris ==
In 1894, with the outbreak of the Cuban War of Independence, Estévez, his wife, and their son went into exile in Paris, France. The family, committed to the Cuban independence cause, provided financial and logistical support to the revolutionary movement.

By December 1895, Marta Abreu and her husband Estévez were actively engaged in supporting Cuban independence. That same year, Marta began making significant and strategically crucial financial contributions to the revolutionary cause. The historical consensus is that just as Martí's ideological vision, Gómez's military leadership, and Maceo's formidable combat skills were essential to securing victory, so too were the substantial monetary donations that fueled the war effort. Marta Abreu during their period of exile in France became the single-highest financial contributor to the independence army, earning the honorific title "Patroness of Cuba."

Luis Estévez dedicated his intellect and strategic efforts to promoting the Cuban independence movement through the press, aiming to garner international support. This propaganda campaign was disseminated through European newspapers, with Marta contributing to their publication.

Following the war, they returned to Cuba in January 1899. In 1899, Estévez also published Del Zanjón a Baire, a critique of autonomist policies.

== Service in the Republic of Cuba ==
Following the conclusion of the Cuban-Spanish-American War, the United States government appointed General Leonard Wood as Governor General of Cuba. In turn, Wood selected Estévez to serve as Secretary of Justice. A distinguished jurist, Estévez carried out significant reforms during his tenure, earning recognition for his contributions to the administration of justice. However, after only a few months in office, he resigned. His decision was driven by both health concerns and the need to personally manage Marta Abreu's affairs, which required his immediate attention.

On October 9, 1889, Estévez was elected President of the Cuban National Party.

By 1901, Cuba was experiencing a period of intense political activity. Tomás Estrada Palma was nominated as a candidate for the presidency of the Republic, and several prominent figures were considered for the vice presidency, including Estévez. The aging Generalísimo Máximo Gómez, an influential figure in the political landscape, strongly supported Estévez for the position. Initially, Estévez declined, but after multiple visits and lengthy discussions with Gómez, he ultimately accepted the nomination.

In the subsequent elections, Estrada Palma and Estévez ran unopposed, as General Bartolomé Masó Márquez had withdrawn his candidacy. Upon Estrada Palma's victory, Estévez assumed the role of the Republic of Cuba's first Vice President in 1902.

Luis Estévez served as vice president until he and his wife, Marta, grew concerned that the Estrada Palma administration was steering the young Republic in a direction that threatened its stability. Although they believed in Estrada Palma's good intentions, they felt compelled to distance themselves from his government. During this period, Marta and Luis spent much of their time at their San Francisco sugar mill near Cruces, only traveling to Havana occasionally to offer counsel to the president and express their hopes for the nation's future. Eventually, Luis Estévez chose to resign from his position as vice president.

On March 31, 1905, in moral opposition to Estrada Palma's attempts at re-election, especially what he believed to be Estrada Palma's subservient attitude to the Platt amendment and US involvement in Cuba, he tendered his official resignation.

== Return to Paris and death ==
In June of that year, he returned to Paris with his family.

In 1906, Esteves published Tiempos pasados, in which he firmly rejected any political resolution that did not lead to full Cuban independence. In this work, he stated; "Annexation is not a Cuban solution because Cuba already has its solution with independence."

By December 1908, Marta's longstanding stomach ailments worsened, prompting doctors to recommend surgery. Diagnosed with appendicitis, she underwent an operation, but complications arose, leading to sepsis.

On January 2, 1909, Marta Abreu died after complications from an appendicitis operation, and was buried at Cimetière du Nord. Estévez brought flowers to his wife's grave every morning, very carefully arranging them in the marble flower pot next to her headstone. Overcome with grief, Estévez took his own life by firearm on February 4, 1909.

On February 20, 1920, their remains were repatriated to Cuba, and interred in Havana's Christopher Columbus Necropolis.

== Scientific work ==
Lesser known about his life is Estévez's early passion for the natural sciences. He is known as a co-author of some of his wife's written works, but he also had a keen scientific curiosity before he met her.

At just 15 years old, in 1865, he became an associate member of the Science Section of the Liceo de Matanzas, and was elected deputy secretary of the section later that year, serving until the institution closed in 1869. He worked alongside notable Cuban naturalists, including Sebastián A. de Morales, Manuel J. Presas, Francisco Jimeno, and Joaquín Barnet.

During this time, Estévez contributed to El Liceo magazine, beginning with a translation of "The Beaver" in September 1865. In November of that year, he published "Valva de un pecten," his first known original article, which summarized a scientific presentation he had given on the existence of certain mollusk fossils in Matanzas. He continued to publish scientific articles, including "Apuntes entomológicos" in March 1866.

Estévez also made significant contributions to the Natural History Museum, established by the Science Section in 1866, donating a transatlantic map illustrating telegraph cable routes, a sample of Vesuvius lava rock, a collection of minerals and fossils, and preserved animal specimens. Among his donations was a silver medal commemorating the 1860 maiden voyage of the Leviathan, a pioneering steamship.
