= San Jacinto Plaza =

Historic park in El Paso, Texas

Coordinates: 31.75966°N 106.48856°W

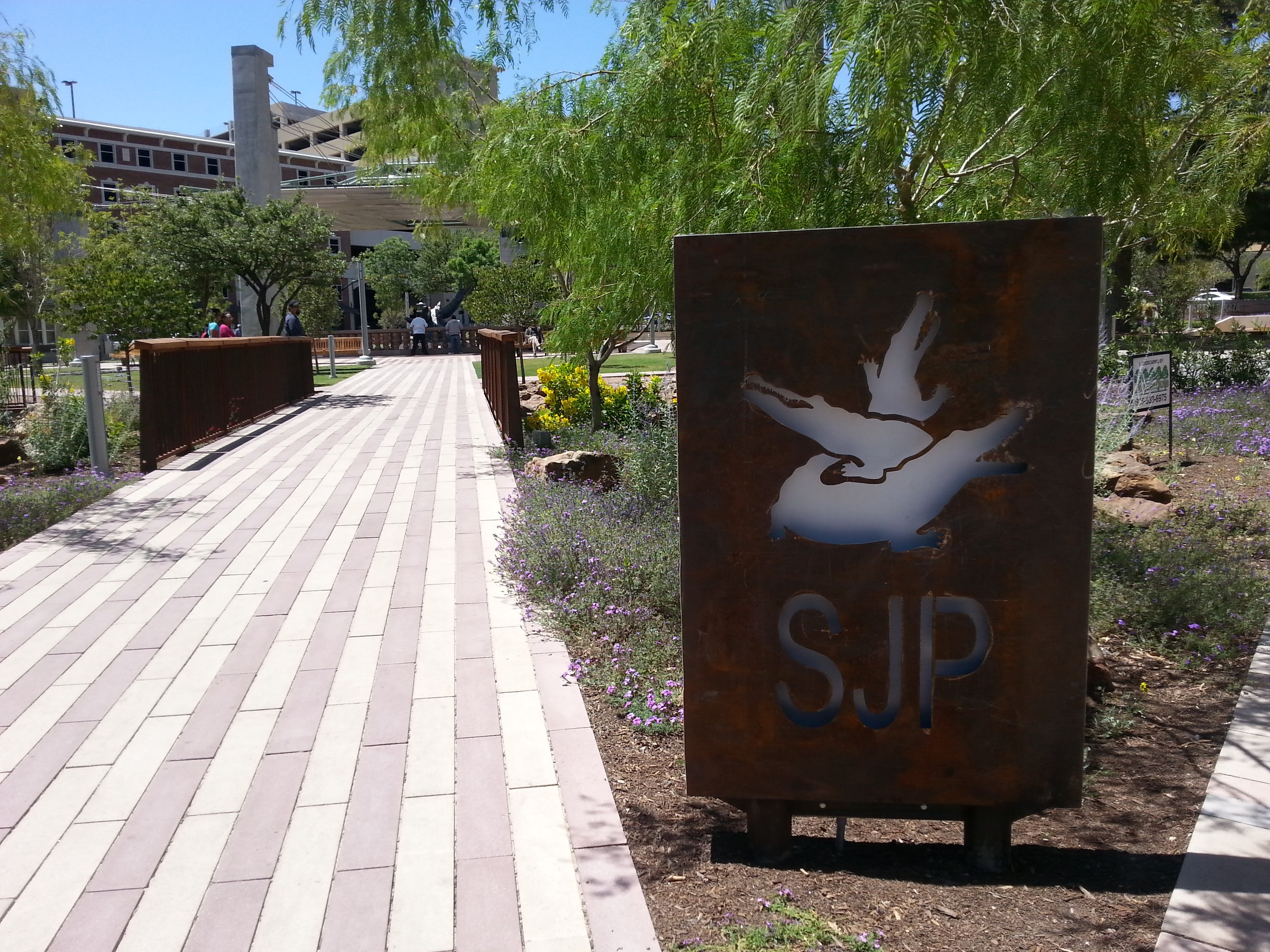
San Jacinto Plaza, El Paso, TX

San Jacinto Plaza is a historic park located on the corner of Oregon and Mills in the heart of Downtown El Paso, Texas.

== History ==
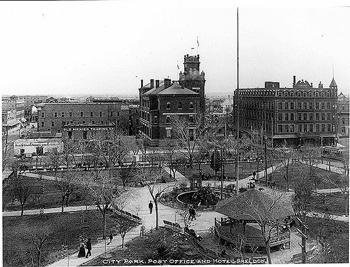
Earliest known photo of San Jacinto Plaza.

When the US government leased land from Smith's ranch, for the first Post opposite El Paso (meaning El Paso del Norte, later renamed Ciudad Juarez), U.S. Army troops would drill in the plaza. The city of El Paso acquired the property on which the Plaza is located in 1881 from William T. Smith. Smith had bought the land from the heirs of its early owner, Juan Maria Ponce de Leon, a prominent El Paso figure, who had owned the spot since 1827. The square had since been the location of the corrals for de León’s ranch. The city cleared and cleaned the dry, sandy, mesquite-filled property and in 1903 the City Council officially named the park in honor of the famous Battle of San Jacinto during which Texas successfully fought for its independence.

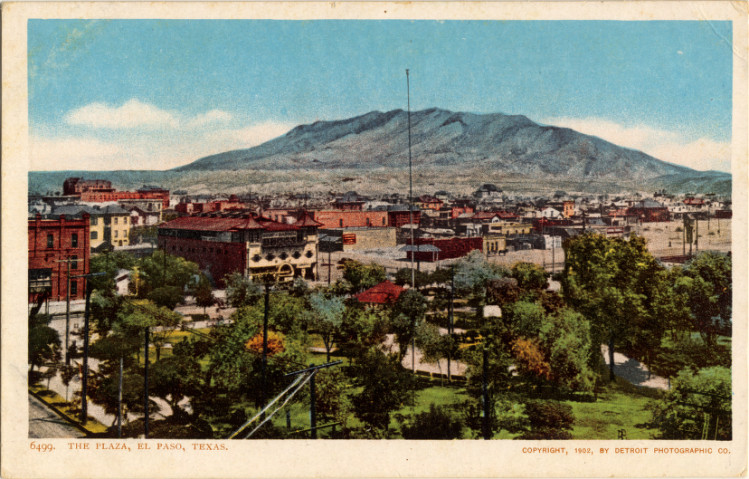
The Plaza, El Paso, Texas (postcard, circa 1902)

J. Fisher Satterwaite, El Paso Parks and Streets Commissioner, contracted with Fisher Satterthwaite to create beauty out of this desert patch. By 1883, the park was surrounded by a fence, a walled pond was created, a gazebo was erected and 75 Chinese Elm trees were planted. Satterthwaite then introduced three alligators into the pond.

During the Mexican Revolution of the 1910s, cannons decoratively placed in the park were stolen for use in the conflict.

=== Alligators ===
Postcard (c.1920) depicting a caretaker inside of the protective fence of Alligator Pond. Note the number of Spectators gathered around the perimeter fence.

The alligators were the central attraction and thrived. At one time the pond contained as many as seven of the reptiles. Most visitors to the park would rest on the wall surrounding the pond and watch the alligators. The reptiles quickly became a staple of the El Paso Culture. In 1952, an alligator named Oscar was hauled to Texas Western College and, as a prank, placed inside geology Professor Howard Quinn's office. On another occasion an alligator was found in the swimming pool at the college right before an intramural swim meet. Sally, one of the first alligators placed in the pond, was the object of a weight-guessing contest. The closest guess won $100 and a trip to Mexico. In 1952, Minnie, a 54-year-old female alligator, laid an egg in the pond and spectators were delighted when they saw a protective Minnie spring to life and rush towards her egg as park employees cleaned the pond.

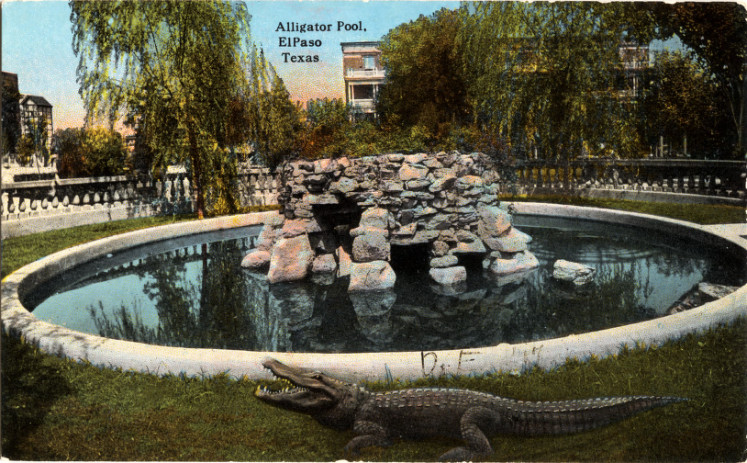
Alligator Pool, El Paso, Texas (postcard, circa 1913)

In March 1953, Oscar was found dead at the bottom of the pond, the result of internal injuries after vandals removed him and threw him back into the pond when police arrived. Seven months later, El Pasoan Myrtle Price donated two alligators named Jack and Jill to the Plaza in place of Oscar.

The alligators were finally moved to the El Paso Zoo in 1965 after two were stoned to death and another had a spike driven through its left eye. The alligators were briefly returned to the plaza in 1972 only to be removed once again in 1974 because of vandals. The pond was permanently removed shortly after.

Many people still fondly refer to the plaza as “La Plaza de los Lagartos,” or Alligator Plaza. Today, a fiberglass sculpture by nationally acclaimed local artist Luis Jiménez honors the original alligators.

== Distinctive features ==
Another distinctive feature of the Plaza in the 1950s was a statue known as “The Boy with the Leaking Boot.” This statue stood in City Hall Park for 50 years before it was moved to San Jacinto Plaza. There it was surrounded by a moat and guarded by alligators. The statue currently stands on the first floor of El Paso's Museum of History.

Preachers trying to spread the word of the Gospel have always culminated at the plaza. In August 1952, a delegation of Baptist ministers held revivals in the park. The ceremonies attracting hundreds at a time. The ministers said they picked San Jacinto Plaza as a revival site because of the need to cut down on evil, drunkenness and communism.

Since 1954, the traditional lighting of the city Christmas tree in the Plaza has officially begun the Christmas season in El Paso. Mayor Fred Hervey was the first to officially light the thousands of multi-colored lights that covered the tree, fountains and nativity scenes. Thousands of El Pasoans watched this 20 minute ceremony which included music from the 62nd Army Band and featured Ted Bender as the Master of Ceremony.

San Jacinto Plaza has always served as a transportation terminal in El Paso. In 1907, horse-drawn carriages lined up around the Plaza. Before buses existed, trolleys made their daily stops at the Plaza. In the 1950s, the Plaza became a major boarding site for city buses as well as a pick-up point for private transportation such as taxicabs.

== Today ==
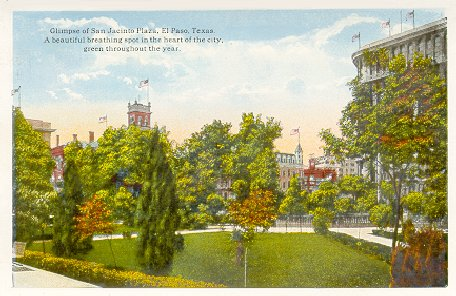
Postcard (c.1914) depicting San Jacinto Plaza at the time.

San Jacinto Plaza continues to be the heart of downtown El Paso, but like most public places, it has its share of problems. The plaza has experienced several remodelings since its origination. The plaza is still a transportation center, and volumes of people remain seated on benches almost daily. Friends still gather to eat and socialize.

Concerns over beggars aggressively approaching park goers, as well as pickpockets have arisen. In recent years, the park has begun to attract transients, peddlers, the poor, and the homeless. Fountains are dry, furnishings are warped. Recently, the city has responded positively to the refurbishment of the park. In 2003, the entire park was once again cleared, cleaned, and rebuilt.

== Renovation ==
As of February 2016 the park is undergoing a $5.3 million renovation. The money for the renovation is from a quality of life bonds that was approved by the citizens of El Paso in November 2012. Funding is also from the Tax Increment Reinvestment Zone Fund which are special zones created by City Council to attract new investment in certain areas. For the past several months contractors have been working on excavation for irrigation and to add 10 feet of park on all sides, along with new sidewalks and gutters drains. All these improvements will be done in Phase 1 of the renovation. The second phase of the renovation started in February 2014. Which will include different amenities such as a full service café, a huacha court, reflecting pool, and splash pad. Crews will also be installing benches around the new modern park, along with landscaping and irrigation.

== Final product ==
San Jacinto Plaza faced many delays throughout renovations which ranged from design changes to shipment delays. These delays pushed the completion date back more than a year. The original completion date was set for February 2015, but due to these delays the project was not complete until April 2016.

Due to these delays mayor Oscar Leeser has stated that the city will bill the contracting company, Basic IDIQ, for these delays.

The official reopening date was April 16, 2016, at 9:30 a.m., where a ceremony was held at the Plaza in downtown El Paso. Followed by a celebration from 10 a.m. to 7 p.m.

== External links & references ==
- El Paso Historic Registry
- Mention of History by UTEP
- El Paso Community College Local History Project
