= Leoncio Vidal =

Cuban revolutionary

Leoncio Vidal y Caro (September 12, 1864 – March 23, 1896) was a Cuban revolutionary that fought in the Cuban War of Independence. A colonel, he fell in battle in Santa Clara, Cuba. He is considered a hero in Cuba, and the Parque Vidal in Santa Clara was named in his honor. Vidal was the uncle of General Emilio Mola.

== Early life ==
Born in Cuba to a Cuban mother, Marina del Rosario Caro Reyes, and a Spanish father, Leoncio Vidal Tapia, Vidal and his family lived through the calamities of the Ten Years' War in the town of Corralillo. Vidal's father enlisted in the Spanish forces against the Cuban rebels. However, the killing of a ten-year-old boy drove him to protest the war and move his family to Spain. The Vidal family lived ten years in Barcelona, the birthplace of Leoncio Vidal Tabia. There, Leoncio Vidal y Caro met his extended family, including his paternal grandfather, who awed Vidal with his stories of resistance against Napoleon's invasion of Spain and of faith in and defense of the country.

Known as "the Cubans" while in Spain, Vidal and his brothers learned Catalan quickly. Always concerned for their education, Vidal's father sent the brothers to a school in Manresa. During this time, the Carlist Wars ravaged Northern Spain. The young and idealist Vidal brothers embraced the Carlist ideology, fled the school, and joined guerrillas around Manresa. But the chief of the guerrillas recognized the young boys and ordered them back to school. Vidal, however, escaped and returned to the guerrillas. He fought in battle and received a head wound. Vidal's father transferred Vidal and his brothers back to Barcelona, where they studied business, English, and French, among other subjects.

== Life ==
In 1878 the Ten Years' War ended, and the Vidal family returned to Cuba. Rather than return to Corralillo, they settled in Camajuaní, where there were lucrative business opportunities. There, the Vidal brothers grew very close, and became integrated in the social and cultural life of the Cuban town. They started a newspaper and spoke out against the exploitation of poor farmers. They also the modernization of the island, including the introduction of electricity, the creation of a firefighting corps, the construction of an aqueduct, and efforts to increase literacy.

Leoncio Vidal became involved early on in revolutionary activities. He attended secret meetings and discussions with other Cubans that would become revolutionaries. The Vidal brothers and the revolutionaries began printing the newspaper with revolutionary and progressive ideas. Vidal urged poor farmers to work with him to protest the unjust prices charged by middlemen. Vidal quietly looked for people with whom to collaborate and created a secret army that spied on and penetrated the Spanish ranks and created a network for trafficking medicine, weapons, and strategic information. Vidal collaborated with a telegraph worker to obtain the first electric dynamite detonator. He also gained the support of certain wealthy persons and maintained sources for medicine. Vidal's wife Rosa Caro and a group of other women played an important role in smuggling medicine, ammunition, clothes, food, and information.

Vidal traveled the countryside looking for supporters for his cause under the pretext of planting cotton. He was successful; when the War of Independence began in 1895, the great majority of farmers joined him. With the rank of colonel, Vidal fought in many battles and skirmishes, including the following:

- an attack on the fort in Santa Fe on October 30, 1895
- an attack on and looting of a train on November 25, 1895
- a skirmish in Las Yaguas on December 21, 1895
- an attack on San Lorenzo (in which he led the guerrillas of Camajuani with machetes, capturing rifles, machetes, and horses) on January 12, 1896
- a skirmish in Palo Prieto on February 8, 1896
- the Battle of Santa Clara (not to be confused with the 1958 Battle of Santa Clara) on March 23, 1896,

Vidal led the only column of men to penetrate the city of Santa Clara and advance to the center of the city. He reached the city plaza, where Spanish riflemen shot and killed him. The death of the colonel dealt a major blow to the rebels.

Today, Vidal is remembered as a hero of Cuba's independence. The central park of Santa Clara, Parque Vidal, is named in his honor.

== Family ==
Vidal's brother was imprisoned by the Spaniards. He led a hunger strike and died. Vidal's other brother immigrated to New York City. Vidal's sister married a Spanish Guardia Civil officer, who fought the Cuban rebels in Placetas, Cuba. Their son and Vidal's nephew, Emilio Mola Vidal, was born in Cuba and left for Spain after Cuba achieved independence. He fought in the Spanish-Moroccan Wars and led the uprising against the Second Spanish Republic, sparking the Spanish Civil War. General of the Army of the North, he too would die in war.
