= Diocese of Santa Clara =

Latin Catholic diocese in Cuba

Coordinates: 22.4062°N 79.9680°W

Diocese of Santa Clara Dioecesis Centumfocencis
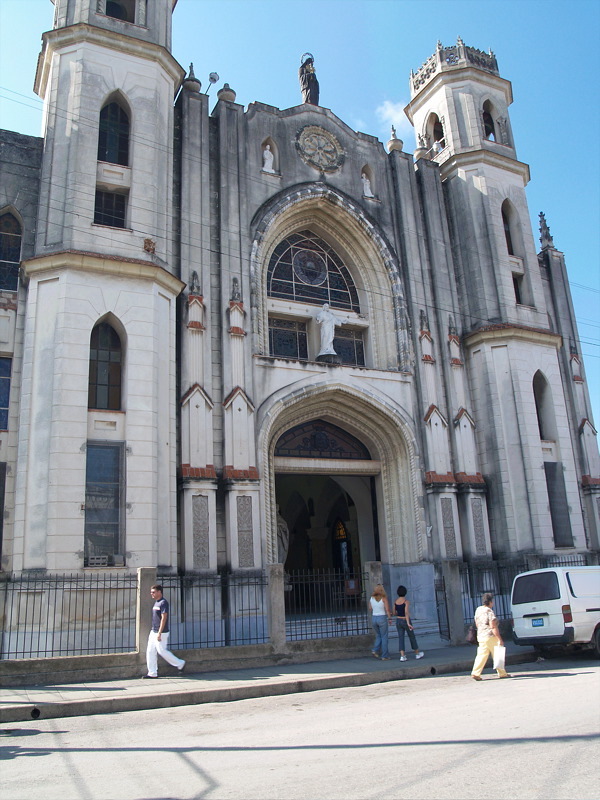
- Catedral de Santa Clara de Asís

Location
- Country: Cuba
- Ecclesiastical province: Province of Camagüey
- Metropolitan: Santa Clara, Cuba

Statistics
- Area: 12,754 km^{2} (4,924 sq mi)
- Population: Total; Catholics: (as of 2004); 1,176,219; 518,935 (44.1%)
- Parishes: 2234

Information
- Denomination: Catholic Church
- Sui iuris church: Latin Church
- Rite: Roman Rite
- Established: 1 April 1995 (31 years ago)
- Cathedral: Cathedral of St. Clare of Assisi

Current leadership
- Pope: Leo XIV
- Bishop: Marcelo Arturo González Amador

Map

The Diocese of Santa Clara is a diocese of the Latin Church of the Catholic Church in Cuba. The diocese is a suffragan of the Archdiocese of Camagüey. Originally erected as part of the Diocese of Cienfuegos in 1903, the parent diocese was renamed to the Diocese of Cienfuegos-Santa Clara in 1971. Finally in 1995 the parent diocese was split to form the Diocese of Cienfuegos and the Diocese of Santa Clara.

== Bishops ==
=== Ordinaries ===
- Fernando Ramon Prego Casal (1995 – 1999)
- Marcelo Arturo González Amador (1999 – present)

=== Auxiliary bishop ===
- Marcelo Arturo González Amador (1998-1999), appointed Bishop here

== External links and references ==
- "Diocese of Santa Clara". Catholic-Hierarchy.
