= Catedral de Santa Clara de Asís =

Santa Clara de Asís
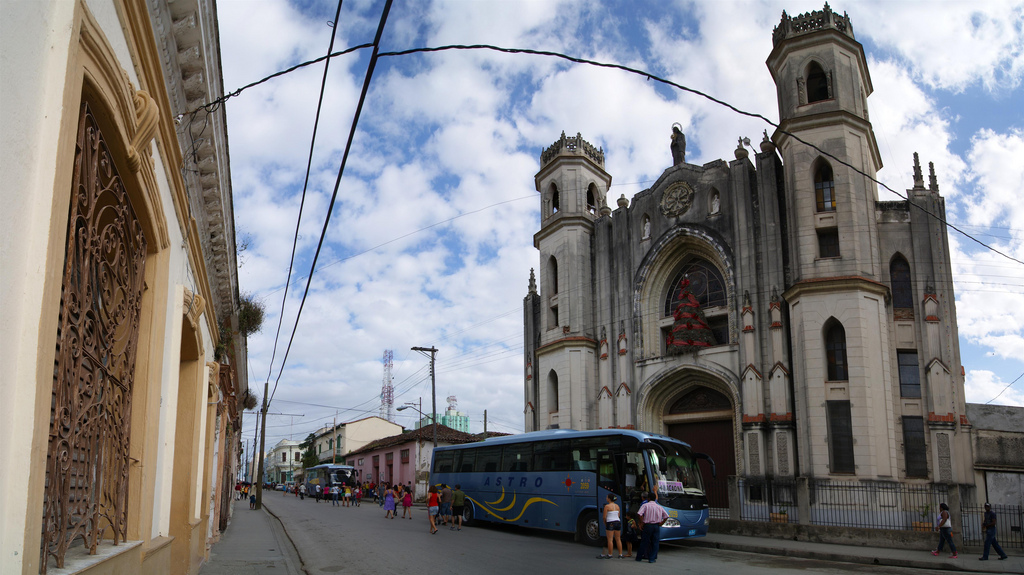
- Santa Clara de Asís
- 22.40635°N 79.96780°W
- Location: Santa Clara
- Country: Cuba
- Denomination: Catholic
- Website: Official website

History
- Status: Parish church
- Founded: 1692 (The 1738 replacement building was demolished in 1923. The current one was built in the 1940s.)
- Founder: Padre Conyedo (1738)
- Dedication: Saint Clare of Assisi
- Consecrated: 1954

Architecture
- Functional status: Active
- Architect: Saul A. Balbona
- Architectural type: Church
- Style: Gothic Revival
- Groundbreaking: June 30, 1940
- Completed: 1954

Administration
- Province: Villa Clara
- Diocese: Santa Clara

The Catedral de Santa Clara de Asís (Cathedral of Saint Clare of Assisi) is a Roman Catholic cathedral located in the city of Santa Clara, Cuba. It lies on Calle Marta Abreu, one of the city's main arteries, only two blocks from Parque Vidal and next to the cultural centre "El Mejunje".

== Overview ==
The cathedral is the most important religious building in the city. The much argued-about church was built in 1940 after its colonial predecessor in Parque Vidal was demolished in 1923. Neo-Gothic in style, the new cathedral includes a wonderful collection of leaded stained glass windows, the marble "pilón" or holy water basin used for baptisms for most of the city's history (those thereby baptized are called "pilongos"), and the statue of Jesus in the upper front holding a gold monstrance. But the most impressive piece of art is the larger-than-life statue of the Virgin Mary inside the structure, locally known as "la Virgen del camino" (Travelers' Virgin). Until the Cuban Revolution, this statue was located on the road to Havana as a way to bless travelers. It was pulled down soon after and it disappeared for more than three decades. It was finally re-discovered around 1995 in a ditch, covered by soil and undergrowth. Already forgotten by the citizens of Santa Clara, a political battle ensued to decide whether to give it to a museum or the church. It was finally granted to the religious authorities.

The construction of the cathedral went through several public controversies. It was a heated electoral issue for ruling mayors in colonial times. Most of them and a number of citizens back in the 1920s were torn between the possibility of keeping the colonial "Iglesia Mayor" (Grand Church, 1738) located in Parque Vidal, or tearing it down in order to make space for a re-designed and bigger plaza and re-locating the cathedral in a nearby location. Some people insisted on keeping the historic building, since it was one of the oldest in the growing city, realizing its importance as heritage. Eventually it was destroyed and two decades later the new one was constructed. Not happy with this action, Church authorities raised a formal complaint versus the city and won, although the church has never received the compensation that was awarded.

== Gallery ==
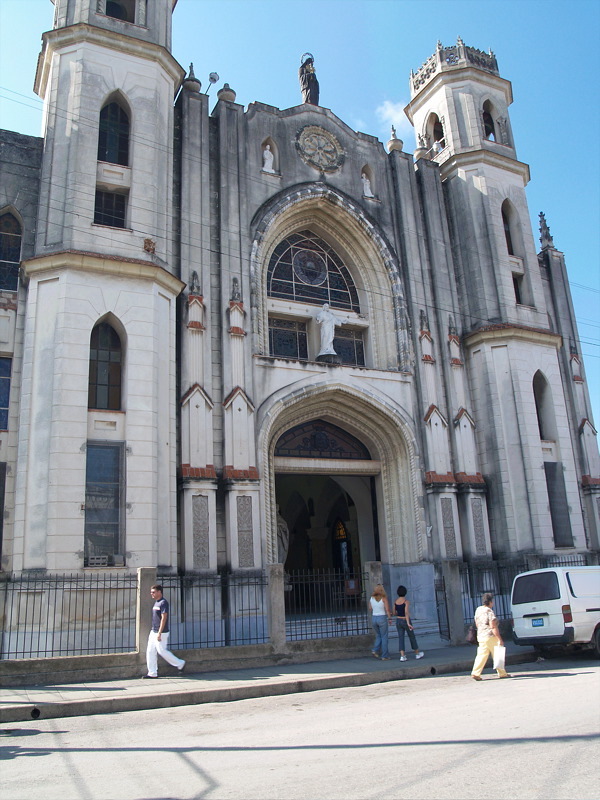
Santa Clara de Asís Cathedral in 1997.

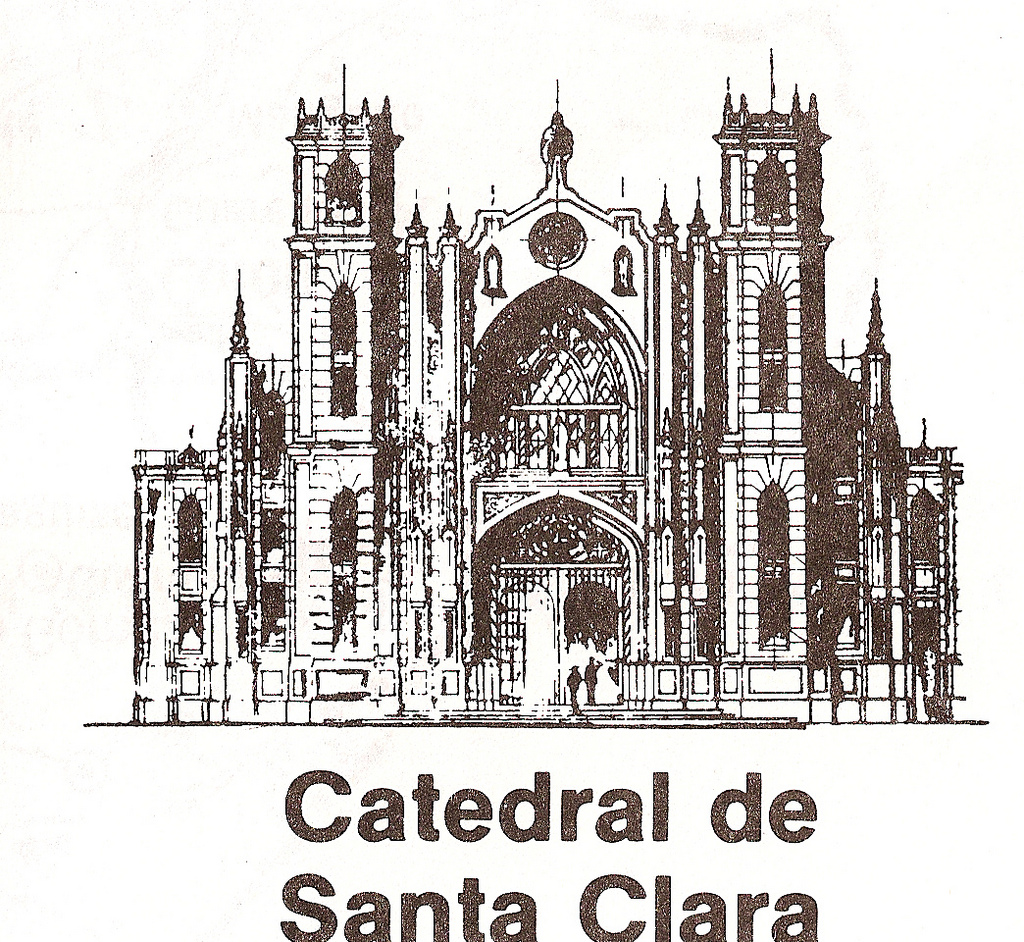
Drawing of Santa Clara de Asís front, published in 1933.

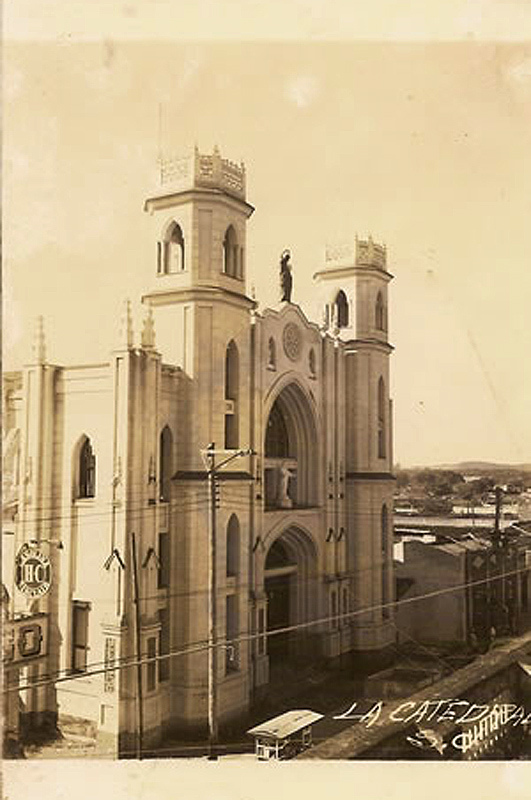
Historic photo of Santa Clara Cathedral in the 1950s.

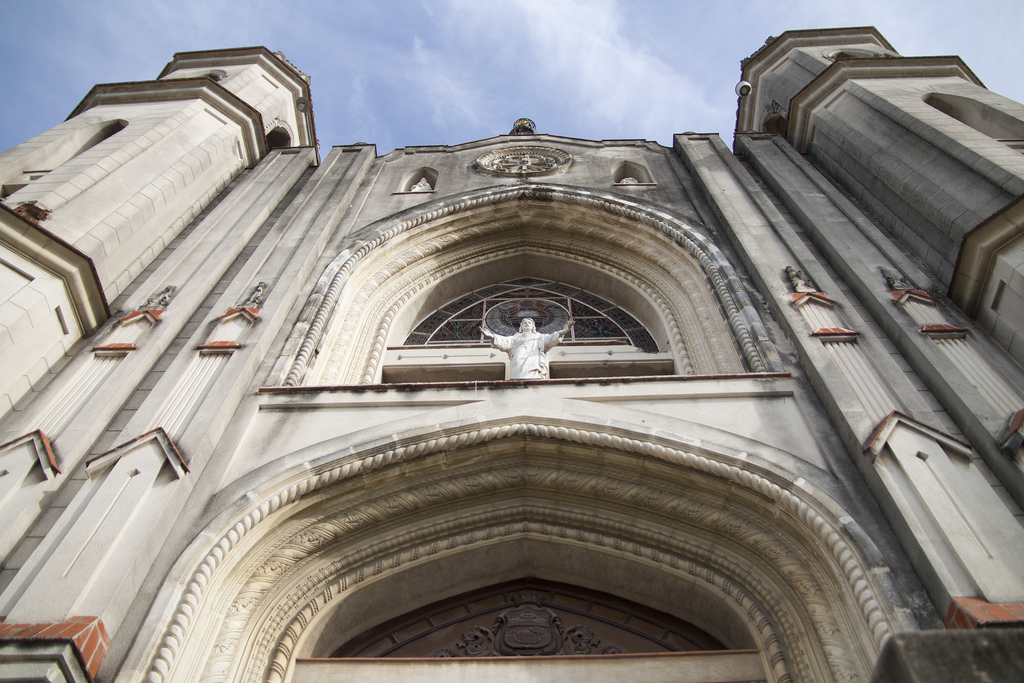
Front detail of Santa Clara de Asís Cathedral.

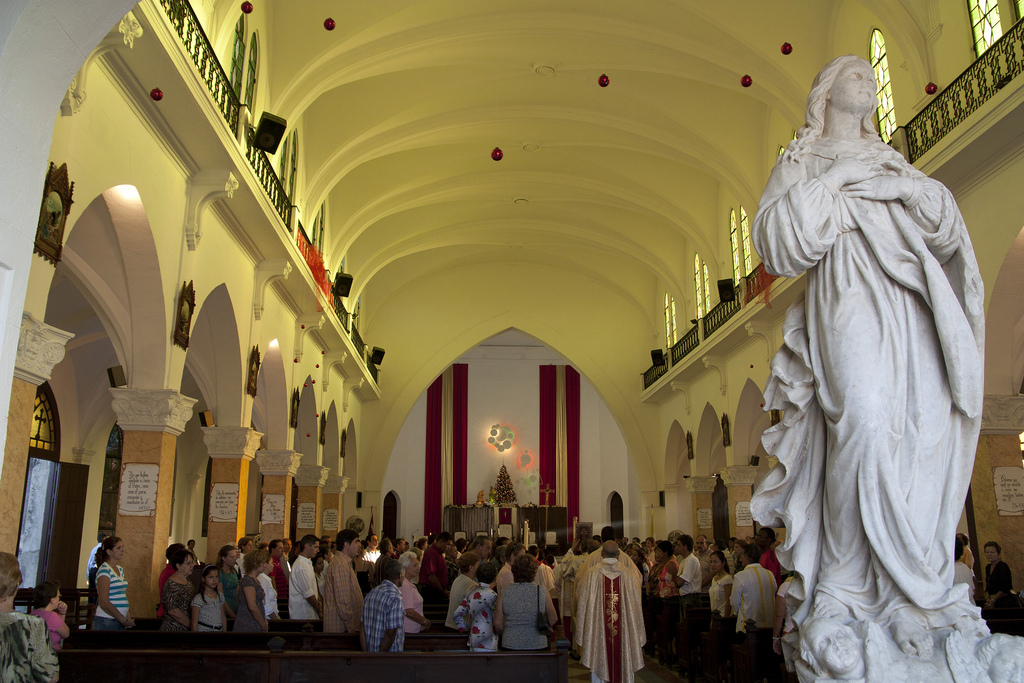
Interior of Santa Clara de Asís Cathedral.

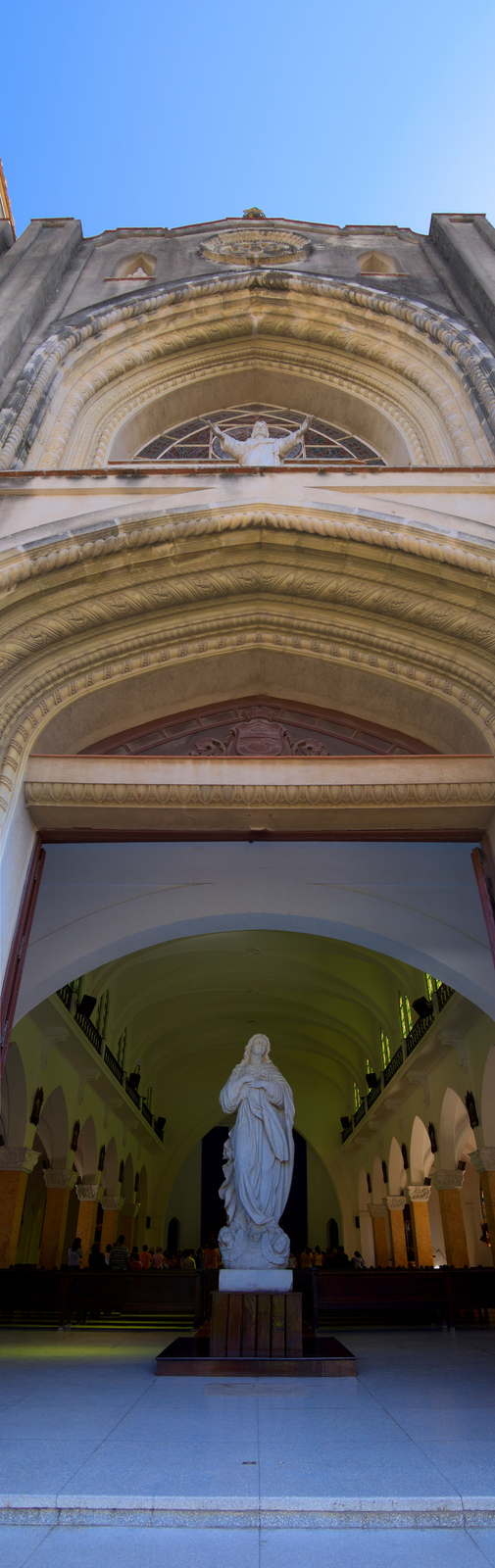
Vertical panorama of Santa Clara de Asís Cathedral.

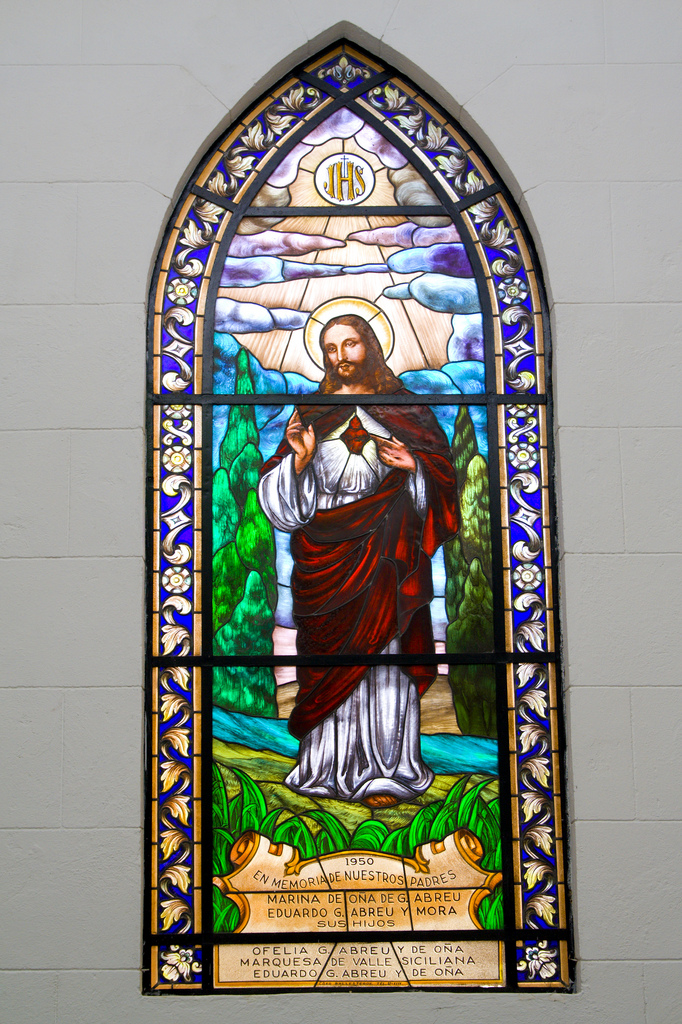
One of the stained glass windows inside Santa Clara de Asís Cathedral. The Sacred Heart of Jesus, built in 1950.

== Bibliography ==
- "Catedral" (official website). Diócesis de Santa Clara, 2013.
- Cristobal Garcia, Angel - El teatro La Caridad. Colección Escambray, PUBLICIGRAF, 1993.
- Cristobal Garcia, Angel - El parque Vidal. Colección Escambray, PUBLICIGRAF, 1993.
