= Catholic Church in Cuba =

The Catholic Church in Cuba is part of the worldwide Catholic Church, under the spiritual leadership of the Pope in Rome. Catholics make up approximately half of the population of Cuba.

== History ==
Catholicism has historically been the majority religion since Cuba's colonization. However, Communist Cuba is no exception to the ideological clash between Communism and religion that was common in communist countries. After Fidel Castro's ascent to power in 1959, he imposed restrictions on religious activities such as Christmas celebrations, and in 1962 barred personnel of the Church from joining the Communist Party of Cuba - following a communist tradition of Marxist-Leninist atheism. However, Castro's efforts were not as successful as in traditionally communist countries such as the USSR or China.

When the Cold War ended, such restrictions were lifted and the atheist guidelines outlined in the Cuban Constitution were removed. Catholics have been able openly join the Party since 1990. In 1998 Pope John Paul II made an official visit to Cuba and met Fidel Castro in person. Castro honored the Pope publicly. Pope Benedict XVI visited in 2012, meeting both Fidel and First Secretary of the Communist Party of Cuba Raúl Castro, as did Pope Francis in 2015. Raúl Castro was so moved by Pope Francis’s visit and speeches that he said “If the Pope continues to speak like this, sooner or later I will start praying again and I will return to the Catholic Church – and I’m not saying this jokingly.”

== Current status ==
The Catholic Church body in Cuba is governed by the Cuban Bishops Conference. There are over six million Catholics - around 60.5% of the total population. The country is divided into three archdioceses and eleven dioceses.

The Catholic Church in Cuba has taken on a more politically active role than in many other countries. It claims to have engaged in discussion with the government on issues such as political prisoners and free market reforms.

In 2026 Catholic bishops spoke out about the crisis facing the country because of the fuel blockade, with Bishop Arturo González Amador of Santa Clara, head of the country's Bishops' Conference, saying "this is the saddest and most difficult time that I am aware of in the history of my people. Everything is a struggle to survive. The present is unsafe and the future is completely unknown.” The bishops also published a statement to the "Catholics of Cuba and all Cubans of good will" warning of the risk of violence and social chaos. Pope Leo XIV made reference to this statement in his Angelus address on 1 February 2026.

Catholics in Cuba have greater religious freedom than those in other Communist countries such as China, Laos, North Korea, and Vietnam.

== 2025 Jubilee ==
Following a meeting between Pope Francis and First Secretary of the Communist Party of Cuba Miguel Díaz-Canel in August 2022, Cuba released more than 500 prisoners from their sentences to honor the Catholic Church's 2025 Jubilee Year. According to Díaz-Canel, in his statement accompanying the prisoner release, Cuba maintains “a respectful, frank, and constructive relationship with the Vatican and the Supreme Pontiff, which facilitates decisions such as the one recently taken.”

== Structure ==
- Archdiocese of San Cristóbal de la Habana
  - Diocese of Pinar del Río
  - Diocese of Matanzas
- Archdiocese of Camagüey
  - Diocese of Ciego de Avila
  - Diocese of Cienfuegos
  - Diocese of Santa Clara
- Archdiocese of Santiago de Cuba
  - Diocese of Guantánamo-Baracoa
  - Diocese of Holguín
  - Diocese of Santísimo Salvador de Bayamo y Manzanillo

== See also ==
- Conference of Catholic Bishops of Cuba
- List of Central American and Caribbean Saints
- Religion in Cuba
