= Parque Vidal =

Park in Santa Clara, Cuba

Coordinates: 22°24′24.91″N 79°57′53.78″W

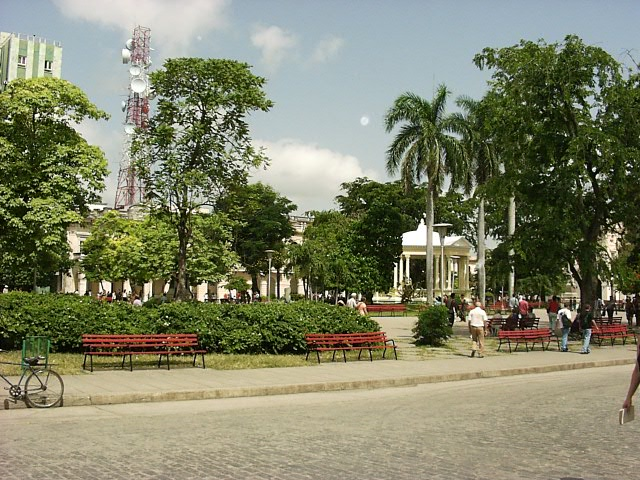
Parque Vidal

Parque Vidal (also known by its previous names of Plaza Central and Plaza Mayor) is a park located in the center of Santa Clara, Cuba, covering an entire square block of the city. Due to its surrounding architecture, combining eclectic neo-classical and colonial-style buildings, as well as the large number of historic monuments dating from different historical periods, the park was designated as a National Monument in a ceremony in 1998.

== Monuments in the park ==
The Glorieta gazebo in the center of the park, erected in 1911, still serves for weekly public concerts by the city's Philharmonic Band. North of the Glorieta is a bust of Leoncio Vidal, the War of Independence colonel who died on that spot fighting Spanish forces, and for whom the Park is named. Next to this bust is an obelisk, the first monument erected in the park, dedicated to the priest who migrated from the coastal town of Remedios with other families and founded the city. Between these monuments is a statue of “el niño de la bota” (The Boy with the Leaking Boot), one of the symbols of the city. This bronze statue depicts a boy with a leaking boot in his hand. The original base was changed to a more contemporary red granite in the 1960s, and remained that way until the 1990s when, in an effort to recover the original design, the city restored it to its original form; however, the use of cheap materials has corroded the base. South of that statue is another, a 1924 bronze statue of Marta Abreu, a local patron much loved by the people of Santa Clara. The base of her statue is said to be a time capsule, containing papers, magazines and objects collected during the construction and placed inside for future generations to find.

== Buildings around the park ==
At the border of the park is the Santa Clara Libre Hotel (formerly the Santa Clara Hilton), considered by critics and the public to be very unattractive compared to the rest of the park, as it clashes with all the surrounding architecture both in scale and design. It is thought that the Cuban Revolution of 1959 caused the cancellation of further projects for higher towers in the plaza, which would have contributed to further destroying the existing colonial and eclectic architectural style of the plaza. However, the building is rich in history. The walls of the hotel still show multiple machine gun marks from the attack of Che Guevara and Camilo Cienfuegos' rebel forces during the 1959 revolt. The Teatro de La Caridad (Charity’s Theater) is one of the Eight Grand Theaters of the Cuban Colonial Era. Other buildings around the plaza include the Plaza Central Hotel, former City Hall and the Colonial de Santa Clara center of dance, and in the corner is the Museum of Decorative Arts, which houses one of the biggest collections of colonial decorative arts in the country.

== Gallery ==
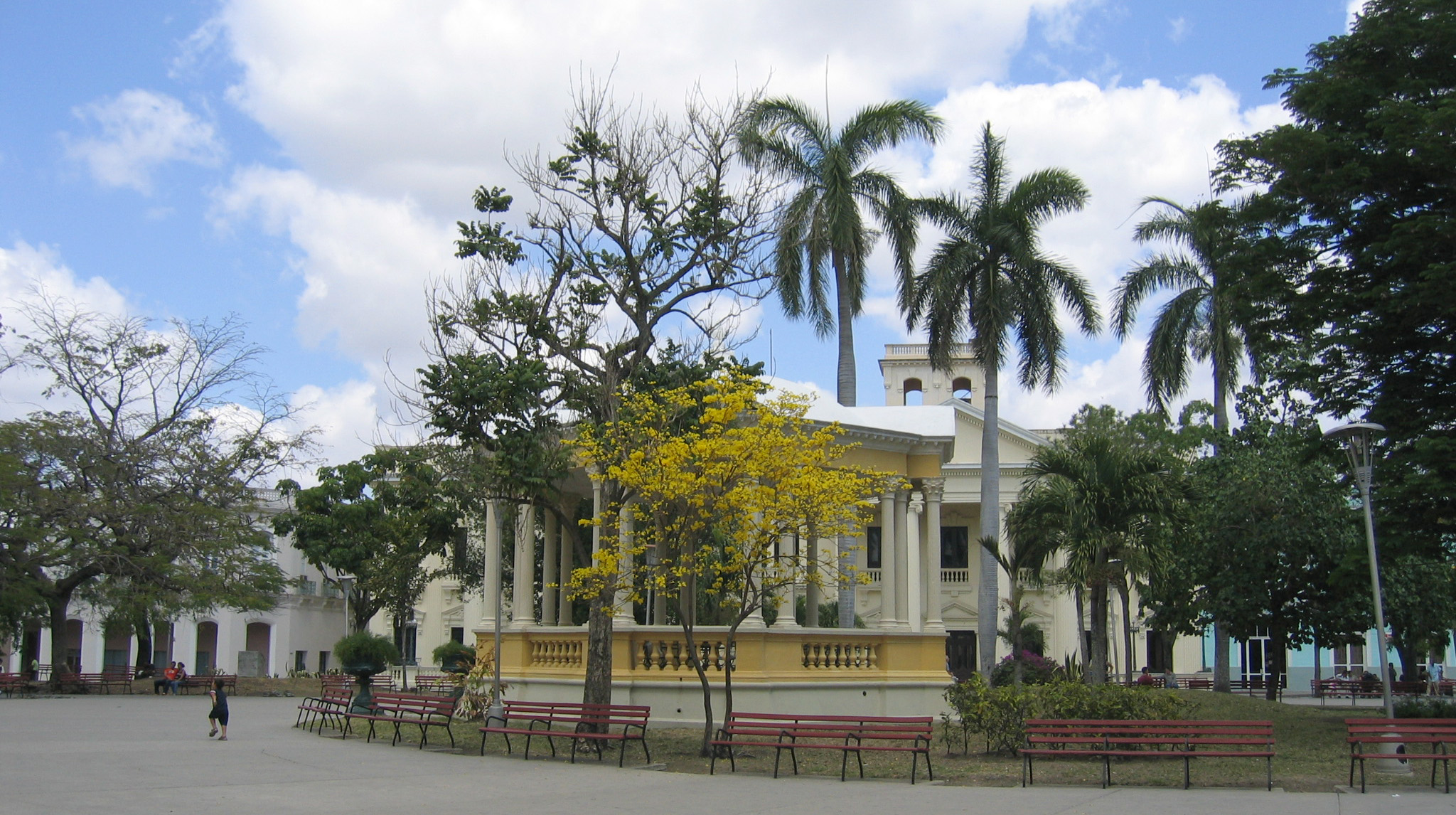
Glorieta

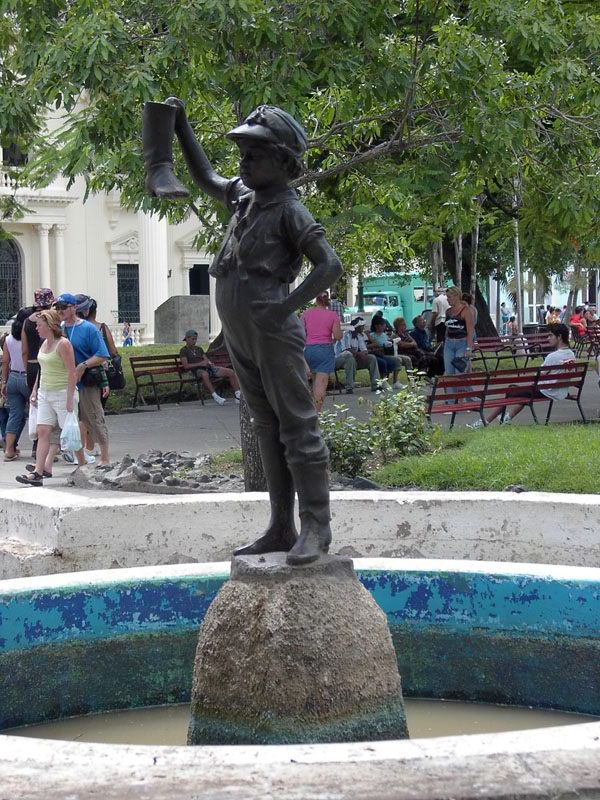
Niño de la bota (Child with leaky boot)

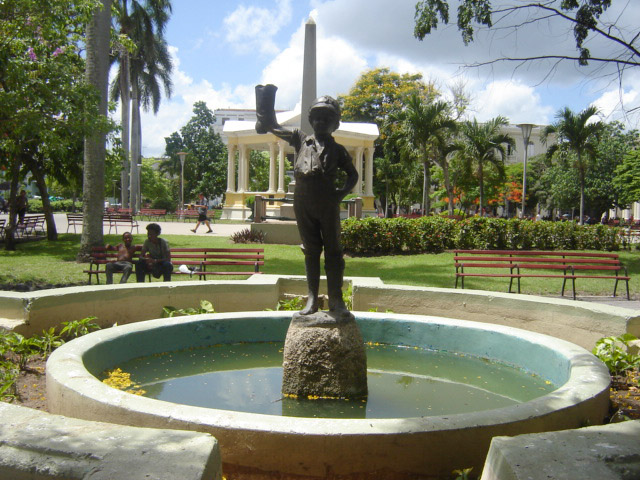
Between the fountain with the Niño statue and the Glorieta is an obelisk honoring the city's first priest

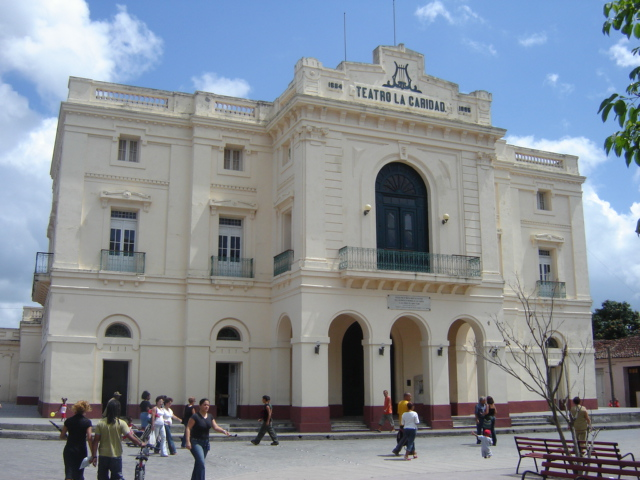
Teatro La Caridad
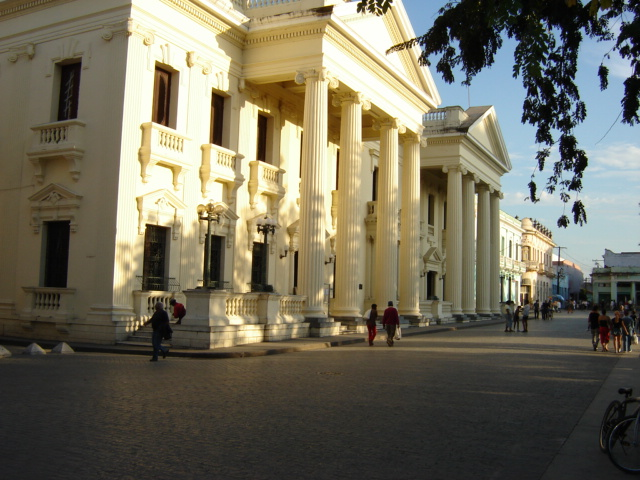
Former City Hall, now Martí Library

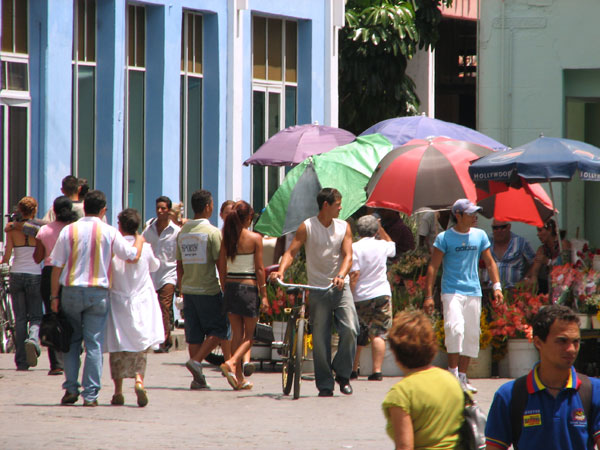
Flower vendors' stalls in Parque Vidal

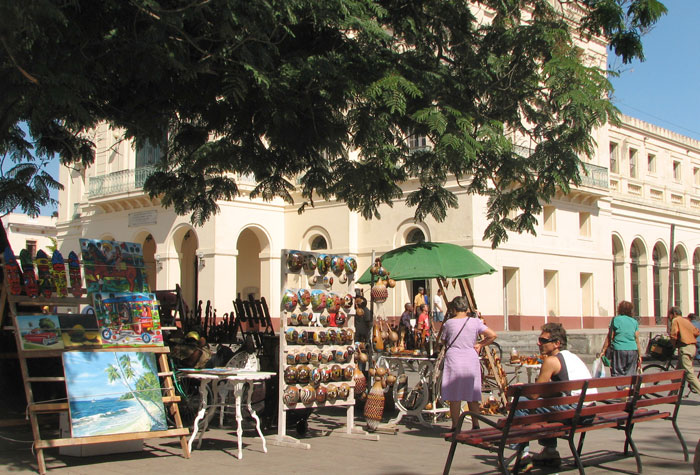
Craftsmen and artist vendors' stalls in Parque Vidal

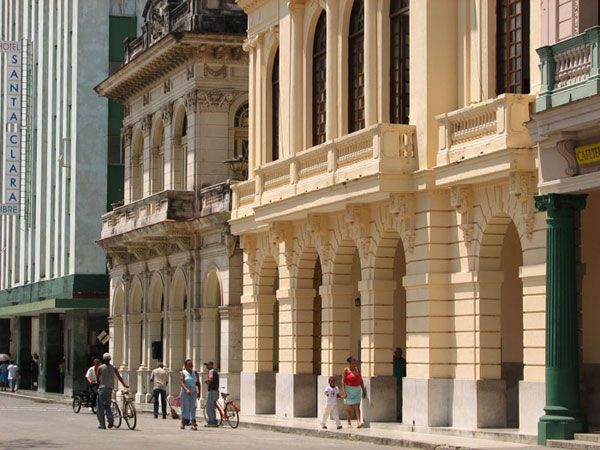
Historic eclectic buildings serving as Cultural Centre and radio station, facing the park
