= Circuba =

Cuba's national circus

- Born: Havana, Cuba
- Movement: Cuban culture Performing arts Circuses

Circuba is the national circus of Cuba. It is associated with the Cuban National Circus School, which was founded on June 6, 1968.

Members of the Circuba company must complete the standard Cuban education in order to be eligible for the four-year program of training in the circus arts. The circus consists of approximately twenty artists, aged between 19 and 30. Twenty-one artists graduated in 1979.
