= Eusebio Hernández Pérez =

Cuban guerilla and doctor (1853–1933)

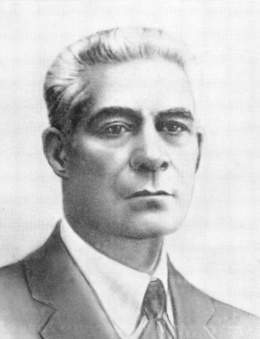
- Born: 18 January 1853; Colón, Captaincy General of Cuba, Spanish Empire
- Died: 23 November 1933 (aged 80); Havana, Republic of Cuba
- Burial place: Colon Cemetery, Havana
- Other name: "Father of Cuban Obstetrics"
- Spouse: Ángeles Mesa de Hernández
- Children: Eusebio Adolfo Hernández
- Military career
- Allegiance: Ejército Mambí
- Service years: 1869; 1897–1898
- Rank: Brigadier general of health
- Known for: Homicultura, contributions to obstetrics
Battles/wars
Conflicts	Ten Years' War; Jagüey Grande Uprising; Little War; Cuban War of Independence; Battles of Saratoga; Attack on Loma del Hierro; Battles of Cascorro; Capture of Guáimaro; Capture of Las Tunas; Capture of Guisa

Eusebio Hernández Pérez (18 January 1853 – 23 November 1933) was a Cuban eugenicist, obstetrician, and mambí in the Ten Years' War, Little War, and Cuban War of Independence. He reached the rank of brigadier general in the Ejército Mambí and was professor at the University of Havana. Sarduy Nápoles named him "The Father of Cuban Obstetrics". He and Domingo Ramos Delgado posited the idea of homiculture, which integrated into the eugenics movement with the two diverging in thought.

== Struggle for Cuban independence ==
=== Early life, initial revolutions, and education ===
Hernández was born in Colón, Cuba on 18 January 1853 to Francisco Hernández and Rosario Pérez. On 10 February 1869, he participated in the Jagüey Grande Uprising led by Gabriel García Menocal, father of Mario García Menocal, during the Ten Years' War. He was imprisoned and sentenced to death but escaped at his execution. Prior to his involvement, he was studying for his Bachelor of Arts degree, then finishing at the Instituto de Segunda Enseñanza de La Habana in 1873. In 1874, he began studying medicine at the Central University of Madrid, which was also interrupted by his participation in the movement. During the Little War, he supported mambises in Matanzas Province and Las Villas Province as well as promoted Cecilio González Blanco. He was the correspondent between rebels in Oriente Province and Havana until fleeing to escape arrest.

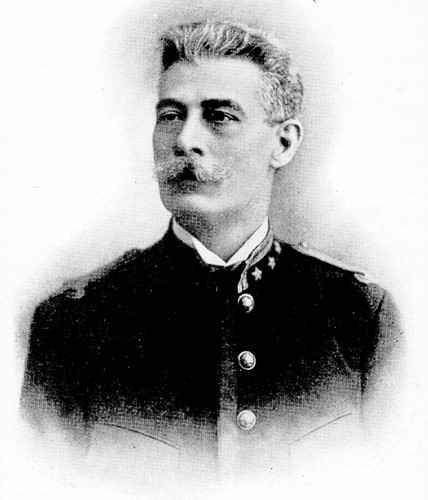

In October 1880, he was in the Colony of Jamaica with his friend, Antonio Maceo. Hernández was his personal and family doctor, delivering his son, Antonio Maceo Marryat. (Note: He also delivered Bernarda Toro and Máximo Gómez's son, Fernando.) The two kept close correspondence between 1880 and 1887. In 1881, he left for Honduras and arrived in Puerto Cortés with Carlos Roloff. He then worked at the San Felipe General Hospital and the National Autonomous University of Honduras. His involvement in the Gómez-Maceo Plan, the 1884–1886 attempt to organize further revolution after the failure of the Little War, had him travel to Guatemala and El Salvador to raise funds and recruit men. Lisandra Pérez suggests Hernández motivated José Martí to attend a 1884 meeting in New York City. Hernández attended these meetings while acting as Máximo Gómez's doctor. He went to Madrid, graduating from the Central University with his medical license, and after his marriage in 1888, settled in Paris. Until 1892, he studied gynaecology and obstetrics under Adolphe Pinard. In this position, Hernández worked on a method for breech birth and treatments for placenta praevia. In 1891, he visited Berlin to study. In 1893, he returned to Cuba and worked towards his doctorate at the University of Havana; he submitted his thesis, Nueva causa de rigidez anatómica del cuello uterino durante el parto, in 1899, at which point he became Doctor of Medicine. From 1893 to 1895, he was head of gynaecology and obstetrics at the Practical School of Medicine of Havana.

=== Cuban War of Independence ===
He joined the physical fight again as a military doctor during the Cuban War of Independence under the command of Calixto García; during the conflict he was also connected to Antonio Maceo, Máximo Gómez, José Maceo, and José María Rodríguez Rodríguez. The Bermuda vessel transported him and 78 mambises (Note: Included were figures Pedro Betancourt Dávalos and Cosme de la Torriente y Peraza.) to Maraví (near Baracoa) on 24 March 1896. He later joined the general staff of Gómez as lieutenant colonel, being promoted to colonel after his performance in the Battles of Saratoga, near Camagüey. On 21 August, he fought in the Attack on Loma del Hierro under García. Between 21 September and 3 October, he participated in the Battles of Cascorro under Gómez. Between 17 and 28 October, he fought in the Capture of Guáimaro under García. The Government Council appointed him secretary of foreign affairs, but he resigned due to issues with President in Arms Salvador Cisneros Betancourt. He rejoined the efforts of his previous generals, fighting in the Capture of Las Tunas from 28 to 30 August and Guisa in November. In January 1898, García sent him to the United States to recover his health as the rebel encampments were in harsh conditions. On 24 August, Hernández was promoted to brigadier general of health and made representative to the Assembly of Santa Cruz del Sur; while in New York City, he resigned the latter position in 1899 due to American occupation after the 1898 Treaty of Paris as an opponent of American intervention in Cuban affairs. He published a memoir of his experiences entitled El período revolucionario de 1879 a 1895 in 1914.

== Later life ==
=== U.S. occupations and early republic ===
On 9 January 1899, he returned to Cuba to pay respects to the deceased García by the request of his son, Carlos García Vélez. He continued to combat annexionist calls and supported progressive causes. There was public outrage at the suffrage grants drafted by the American administration in 1900, which only lent the right to men who owned at least $250 in assets and were literate. They were deemed as worse than those in the Autonomy Charter of Cuba of 25 November 1897 that established universal manhood suffrage. Hernández was a member of the Cuban commission that collaborated with the administration on this policy, (Note: The commission's collaboration was not unanimous: its designated members were mainly men who were seen as friendly to the administration, such as Enrique José Varona, Manuel Sanguily Garritte, Even Pierra, and Autonomistas.) but agreed with the dissidents. Since 1899, he worked as a professor of obstetrics at the Clinic of the University of Havana.

During the 1901 general election of the Republic of Cuba, Hernández was a candidate for the Liberal ticket; he supported universal health care, women's rights, welfare, and the right to education. Afterward he ran for the vice presidency along with Bartolomé Masó's bid. He did not support President Tomás Estrada Palma but also detested those in the 1906 August Revolution. In a 1907 speech during the Provisional Government of Cuba's administration, he demanded sovereignty be restored and declared that since the beginning of the 19th century, geopolitics had been consumed by American imperialism. During the 1908 Cuban general election, he was the Liberal candidate for vice president under José Miguel Gómez but ceded the position to Alfredo Zayas.

=== Homicultura and death ===
In 1911, with Domingo F. Ramos Delgado (1881–1961), another student of Pinard, he published Homicultura (English: Homiculture). They posited an expansive eugenicist concept based on Pinard's puericulture; it outlined a national project for maternal and child health, which were seen as linked, and "took a holistic view of view of influences on human development, linking 'human fitness to a nation’s capacity for peace, order, and prosperity.'" The proposal applied foreign policies such as German Kinderschutzen, centers for women who recently gave birth; French gouttes de lait, distribution centers for pasteurized milk; French crèches, and the French Roussel Law, which monitored wet nursing. Its intended immediate effect was to reduce infant mortality. They also published for general audiences in the journal Vida Nueva. In 1913, the National Homiculture League was founded and included people such as Francisco Carrera y Jústiz and María Luisa Dolz. To spread the idea, Hernández taught a class on homiculture and preventative sexual health at the José Martí Popular University. Proposals in La Habana Province (Note: Modern-day La Habana Province, Artemisa Province, Mayabeque Province, and Isla de la Juventud.) that stemmed from homiculture included prenuptial medical examinations, and legal protection for women, and campaigns for improved working conditions and child nutrition. Homiculture did not receive attention from the government until President Mario García Menocal established the Children's Hygiene Service, which accepted Hernández and Ramos's proposals: inspections on wet nurses and milk and tubercular sanatoriums. The service did not live up to the expectations of the pair as it was limited to Havana and acted as a means of surveillance on women, schools, and daycares. Hernández's wife, Ángeles Mesa de Hernández, along with other Havana women formed the Ladies Committee for the Protection of Children in 1914; it served the poor children of working women as a daycare and source of nutritious food. However, the government did not provide financial support. Hernández consistently followed neo-Lamarckian eugenics but Ramos increasingly turned Mendelian towards the 1920s. Ramos established the Pan American Central Office of Eugenics and Homiculture which had its first international conference in 1927. 28 delegates, representing 16 countries, and other unofficial members attended; included were Mexican Rafael Santamarina Sola (1884–1966), Peruvian Carlos Enrique Paz Soldán, and American Charles Davenport. Ramos, supported by Davenport, suggested a white supremacist code entailing the classification of non-white immigrants and indigenous people as inferior and promoted policies of forced sterilization and racial segregation, as done in the United States. The code was unpopular and the Argentine, Costa Rican, Mexican, and Peruvian delegates in particular contested. In addition to positing homiculture, Hernández modified the Tarnier forceps and Farabeuf's pelvimeter, and developed method for an open-air symphysiotomy.

In 1923, he founded the José Martí Popular University with Julio Antonio Mella; his last public appearance was when Mella's ashes were spread. Hernández's son, Eusebio Adolfo Hernández, was a professor of social sciences here. He also participated in the Soviet solidarity movement with his father. In 1926, he became a member of the Cuban Academy of Sciences and French Society of Obstetrics. That year, Hernández self-diagnosed colon cancer and went to Berlin for his successful colostomy. On 23 November 1933, he died in Havana from pulmonary edema. He was veiled in the Cuban Academy of Sciences rather than the Augla Magna (University of Havana) due to pressure from President Ramón Grau. He was buried in Colon Cemetery, Havana and was awarded the Grand Cross of Carlos Manuel de Céspedes and the Order of the National Red Cross. On 18 January 2016, his remains were moved to the veterans' area of the cemetery in a ceremony headed by José Ramón Machado Ventura, Ramón Espinosa Martín, Roberto Morales Ojeda, and Eusebio Leal.

== Works ==
=== Monographs and articles ===
- Estudio clínico del fórceps en el estrecho inferior (1891)
- Progresos de la Obstetricia contemporánea en Francia. Enseñanzas del profesor A. Pinard (1891)
- La sinfisiotomía. Sigault (1763), Baudelocque (1776), Pinard (1891) (1892)
- Tratamiento del cáncer del útero grávido (1893)
- Diagnóstico del embarazo vesicular (1895)
- El parto consciente sin dolor (1911)
- Cirugía obstétrica de las estrecheces pélvicas (1917)
- La sinfisiotomía en el tratamiento curativo de la insuficiencia pelviana (1924)

=== Published books ===
- Homicultura (1911)
- El período revolucionario de 1879 a 1895 (1914)
- Historia crítica de las pelviotomías. Estado actual, según la práctica del autor (1922)
- Dos conferencias históricas (1935)

== Bibliography ==
- Castillo Canelas, Patricia Elizabeth (26 July 2019). "Inmigración y colonización en Honduras durante la Reforma Liberal, 1876-1891". Población y Desarrollo - Argonautas y Caminantes. 15: 26–33. doi:10.5377/pdac.v15i0.8114. S2CID 212982275.
- Delgado García, Gregorio (2012). "Hernández Pérez, Eusebio (1853-1933)" (PDF). Revista de Ciencas Médicas. 18 (1): 150–151.
- González Quijano, Humberto; Suárez Díaz, Rosa Margarita (2017). "Semblanza del General de Brigada Eusebio Hernández Pérez". Revista Cubana de Medicina Militar (in Spanish). 46 (2): 196–205. ISSN 1561-3046.
- Hoffnung-Garskof, Jesse (7 May 2019). Racial migrations: New York City and the revolutionary politics of the Spanish Caribbean, 1850-1902. Princeton, New Jersey: De Gruyter. ISBN 9780691185750.
- Jeifets, Víctor; Jeifets, Lazar (2017). América Latina en la internacional comunista 1919-1943.: diccionario biografico. Buenos Aires: CLACSO. ISBN 978-2-8218-9582-9.
- Oxford University Press (2010). The Oxford handbook of the history of eugenics. New York: Oxford University Press. ISBN 978-0-19-537314-1.
- Pérez, Lisandro (2018). Sugar, cigars, and revolution: the making of Cuban New York. New York: De Gruyter. ISBN 9781479842643.
- Rodriguez, Daniel A. (2017). ""The dangers that surround the child": Gender, Science, and Infant Mortality in Postindependence Havana". Cuban Studies (45): 297–318. ISSN 0361-4441. JSTOR 44782940.
- Sarduy Ruíz, Esmely; Rojas Tejeda, Daniel (2020). "Approaches to the social-political and teaching-research work of Professor Eusebio Hernández in the neocolonial Republic". Revista Cubana de Obstetricia y Ginecología (in Spanish). 46 (1): 1–13.
- Tarragó, Rafael E. (December 2009). "La lucha en las Cortes de España por el sufragio universal en Cuba". Colonial Latin American Review. 18 (3): 383–406. doi:10.1080/10609160903336218. S2CID 162423266.
