= Capture of Las Tunas =

- Part of Second Eastern Campaign of the Cuban War of Independence
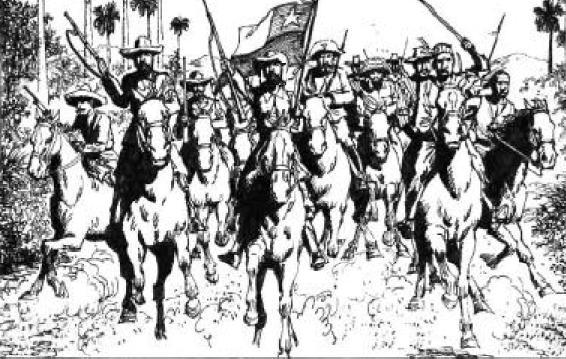
- Calixto García's cavalry charge during the engagement
Date	August 27–30, 1897
Location	Las Tunas, Oriente, Cuba, Spain
Result	Cuban victory

Belligerents
Cuban rebels Supported by: United States	Spain

Commanders and leaders
Calixto García; Mario García; Carlos García; José M. Capote; Frederick Funston	Unknown

Strength
1,200 soldiers, 300 horsemen and 6 cannons	350 soldiers and 100 volunteers, with artillery

Casualties and losses
29 killed, 60 wounded	161 killed, 176 wounded, 409 captured

The Capture of Las Tunas was a military engagement of the Cuban War of Independence. It took place from August 27 to 30, 1897 at Las Tunas, Oriente.

== The Capture ==
In the final days of August 1897, the forces commanded by Lieutenant General Calixto García laid siege to the important military plaza of Victoria de Las Tunas which was almost uninhabited, since most of its inhabitants had gone to the jungle.

After three days of bloody combat, the Cuban forces managed to make the Spanish garrison surrender and capture the plaza, after which they set it on fire, but not before seizing important caches of weapons and ammunition, as well as food and medicine. The casualties of the battle consisted of 29 killed and 60 wounded for the Cubans and 161 killed, 176 wounded and 409 captured.

== Aftermath ==
The Capture of Las Tunas represented an important military victory for the Cuban Liberation Army, as well as a demoralizing defeat for the Spanish Army. At the media level, it served to discredit the propaganda campaign that Captain General Valeriano Weyler carried out about his supposed "pacification" of Cuba and the supposed "success" of his feared and despised reconcentration policy of him. It represented one of the last Spanish military defeats, before the dismissal of Weyler as head of Cuba and the promulgation, in November of the same year, of the Autonomy Charter of Cuba, which sought to placate independence spirits by granting autonomy, something that didn't work either.
