= Second Eastern Campaign =

1898 military campaign in the Oriente Province of Cuba

- Part of Cuban War of Independence
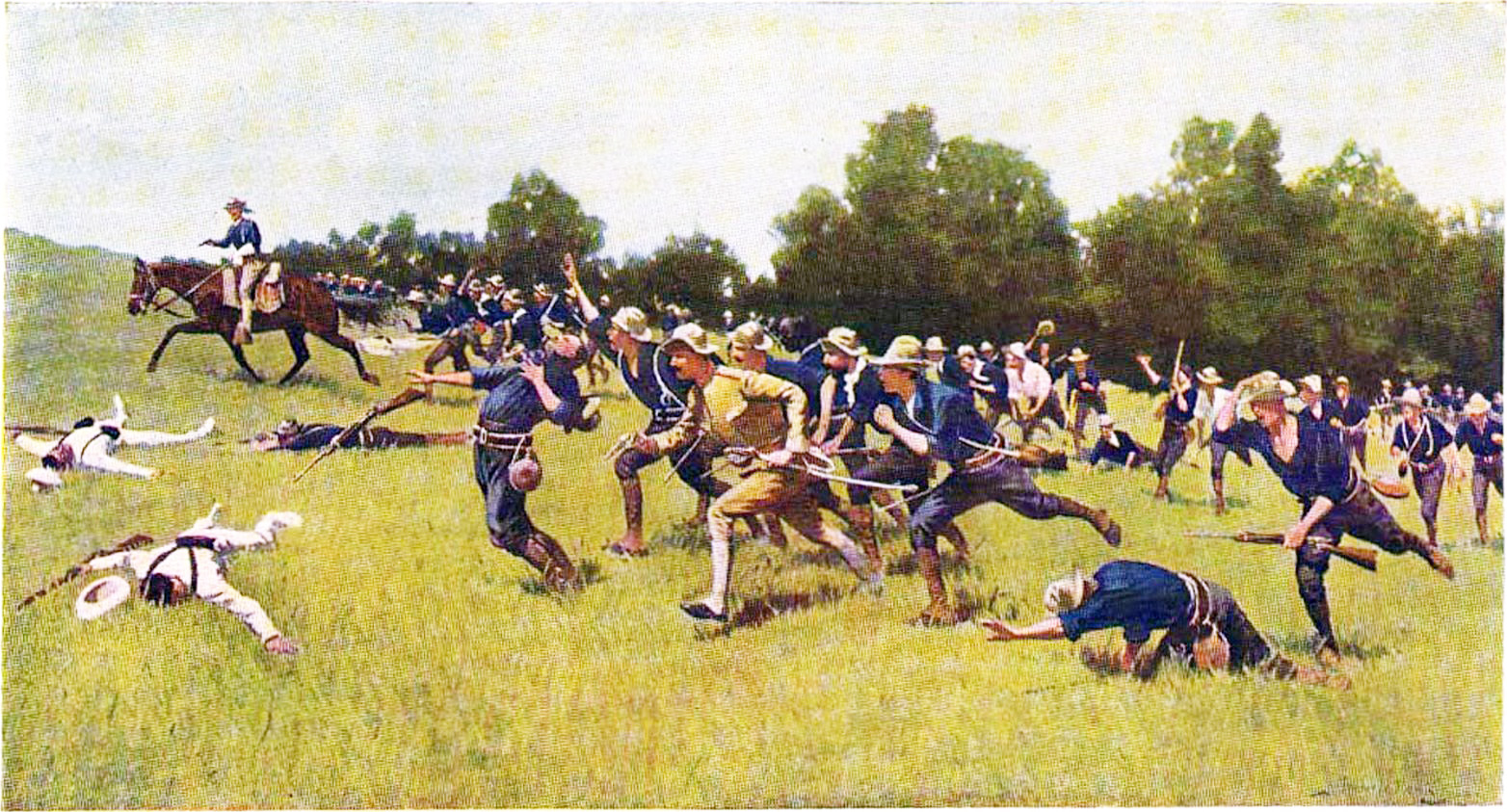
- The Rough Riders charging at the Battle of San Juan Hill
Date	August 12, 1898
Location	Oriente Province, Cuba, Spain
Result	Cuban victory: End of the War; Cuban independence

Belligerents
Cuban rebels	Spain

Commanders and leaders
Calixto García; Jesús Rabí; José M. Capote; Mario García; Carlos García	Valeriano Weyler; Ramón Blanco

Strength
35,000 infantry	7,800 infantry

Casualties and losses
624 killed	2,365 killed

The Second Eastern Campaign was a military campaign that took place between August 1 to 12, 1898, in the Oriente Province of Cuba during the Cuban War of Independence. It was the shortest military campaign of the entire war and it was the one that marked the end of Spanish reign in Cuba and the Spanish Empire in Latin America.

== Background ==
Once the 1890s began, Cuban exiles, coming from the United States, began to group around the increasingly prominent figure of José Martí. The Cuban Revolutionary Party was founded on April 10, 1892, as a single party that brought together all Cubans and non-Cubans who wanted the complete independence of Cuba with the additional objective of also helping Puerto Rico. With Martí as Delegate Chief of the Party, it was decided to name Generals Máximo Gómez and Antonio Maceo, as first and second chiefs, respectively, of the future third war of Cuban independence that was being planned in 1893.

By the end of 1894, all the material and organizational conditions seemed to be well prepared, both inside and outside the island, to start the new war. However, the failure of the Plan de la Fernandina, was a serious setback for Cuban independence plans. However, it was decided to start the war, with or without favorable conditions on February 24, 1895, which was a day of carnivals and popular festivals so that the rebels could catch the Spanish colonial authorities off guard and facilitate the start of the war. Several of the planned uprisings failed, resulting in the death or capture of some important chiefs.

However, the war continued, with the success of the uprisings in the provinces of Oriente and Las Villas, but it did not gain its true strength until the arrival of the Maceo Brothers, Martí and Gómez in April. After many ups and downs, the Maceos, Martí and Gómez, along with other disembarked chiefs, managed to assume command of the Mambisa troops which were becoming more numerous every day with the incorporation of veterans and new recruits. With this, the First Eastern Campaign began in the first days of May 1895 and the Circular Campaign in June of the same year. The first, commanded by Lieutenant General Antonio Maceo and the second by Generalissimo Máximo Gómez. After success of the Cuban forces, the Invasion from East to West in Cuba was unleashed between October 1895 and January 1896 which was also a victory for the Cubans.

However, Major General Antonio Maceo was killed on December 7, 1896, during the Battle of San Pedro. This untimely death was a severe blow to the Cuban forces. The General in Chief of the Cubans, Major General Máximo Gómez, decided to appoint Major General Calixto García as Maceo's successor to the Cuban First Army Corps. General Calixto immediately set about intensifying the war in his home province of Oriente which began the Second Eastern Campaign.

== The Campaign ==
The main battles of this campaign were Guáimaro in September 1896, Cascorro from September to November 1896, Jiguaní and Baire, both in March 1897, the Capture of Las Tunas in August 1897 and the Battle of Guisa from November 1897.

After the entry of the United States into the war, in June 1898, General Calixto's efforts focused on aiding the American landing in eastern Cuba and in the battles of El Caney and San Juan Hill. The war ended in August 1898, and with it the Second Eastern Campaign .

The set of actions carried out in Oriente Province, not only provided abundant war material, but also proved the strength of the Cuban Liberation Army two and a half years into the war. The campaign resulted in victory for the Cubans, helping to end the war.

== Aftermath ==
The victory of this important military campaign resulted in the intensification of the war in Eastern Cuba, as well as showing that the Cuban forces were active and experienced at combat, counteracting the Spanish media campaigns, which tried to affirm that the Cubans were defeated and close to surrender. Likewise, the Cuban forces obtained important military victories, the incorporation of a large number of recruits into the ranks of the Cuban Liberation Army and obtaining new weapons and ammunition.

Along with this campaign, General Gómez developed the La Reforma Campaign. In full development of both military campaigns, the Assembly of La Yaya took place at the end of 1897, in which the Government of the Republic of Cuba in Arms was reconstituted, appointing Major General Bartolomé Masó as president, replacing Salvador Cisneros Betancourt, as had been agreed upon before the war began. Following the successful conclusion of both campaigns, the war and Spanish authority over Cuba ended.
