= Capture of Guisa =

Event of the Cuban War of Independence

- Part of Cuban War of Independence
Date	November 28 – 29, 1897
Location	Guisa, Oriente Province, Cuba
Result	Cuban victory

Belligerents
Cuban rebels	Spain

Commanders and leaders
Calixto García; Mario García; Carlos García; José M. Capote	Unknown

The Capture of Guisa was an event during the Cuban War of Independence. It took place from November 28 to 29, 1897 of the war as the Cuban forces overran the Spanish forces at the town and proceeded to burn it down.

== Capture and Burning ==
In the final days of November 1897, the forces commanded by Lieutenant General Calixto García laid siege to Guisa military plaza which was an important military plaza for the Spanish. However it was almost uninhabited since most of its inhabitants had fled to the nearby jungles. After two days of bloody combat, the Cubans managed to get the Spanish forces to surrender and capture the plaza, after which they set it on fire under direct orders from García but not before seizing important caches of weapons and ammunition, as well as food and medicine. After the burning, the Spanish prisoners were released. For his service and command at the battle, García was promoted to Lieutenant General.

== Aftermath ==
The Capture of Guisa represented a very important military victory for the Cuban Liberation Army as well as a demoralizing defeat for the Spanish Army. In the media sphere, it served to discredit the disinformation campaign that Captain General Valeriano Weyler carried out about his supposed “pacification” of Cuba and the supposed “success” of his feared and despised Reconcentration of him. It represented one of the last Spanish military defeats, before the dismissal of Weyler as head of Cuba and the promulgation, in November of the same year, of the Autonomous Charter, which sought to placate the spirits of independence by granting autonomy, something that did not work either. Spain would end up losing Cuba, Puerto Rico, the Philippines and Guam in 1898 after American intervention in the War.
