= Cuban League (disambiguation) =

The Cuban League was a professional baseball league in Cuba from 1878 to 1961.

Cuban League may also refer to:

- Cuban National Series, an amateur baseball league in Cuba since 1961
- Cuban Elite League, the top-level baseball league in Cuba since 2022
- Cuban National League, a former political party in Cuba
