= James Rymer =

British medical writer

James Rymer (1750–1829; fl. 1775–1822) was a Scottish naval surgeon and medical writer.

== Life ==
James Rymer was born in Kirkcaldy, Fife, on 5 August 1750, the son of Alexander Rymer, merchant, by his wife, Elisabeth Thomson. He claimed to be related to the family of Thomas Rymer, compiler of the Fœdera. His father died when he was young, but he was carefully educated by his mother. After having served an apprenticeship to a surgeon and apothecary, he studied anatomy and medicine at Edinburgh University. In 1770 he left Edinburgh for London. He was there appointed surgeon's mate on HMS Montreal, with which he made two voyages in the Mediterranean and Levant. Soon afterwards he joined the Trident, the ship of Rear-admiral Sir Peter Denis; subsequently went a voyage to Nevis in the West Indies, and in December 1775 became surgeon to the sloop Hazard. He very soon exchanged into the Surprise, commanded by Captain Robert Linzee, which reached Quebec in May 1776, and thence accompanied Admiral Montagu's squadron to St. John's, Newfoundland. On the return voyage, in November 1776, putrid fever broke out.

Rymer was next attached as surgeon to the sloop Alderney, which was stationed at Great Yarmouth. While there he wrote a Sketch of Great Yarmouth, with some Reflections on Cold Bathing, 1777, 12mo. In 1778, in which year he says he published a volume of Remarks on the Earl of Chesterfield's Letters, he was transferred to the Conquistador, which was stationed at the Nore for the reception and distribution of impressed men and volunteers. After fifteen months' service he was transferred to the Marlborough, which was ordered for foreign service. Rymer, who attributed his transference to the dislike of his commanding officer, wrote a somewhat scurrilous pamphlet under the title Transplantation, or Poor Crocus pluckt up by the Root, 1779. He appears to have remained in the Navy till 1782.

Rymer married at Reigate, Surrey, on 28 June 1784, Mary Stanning, by whom he had two daughters and three sons. He practised medicine afterwards at Reigate whilst promoting the sale of his quack medicines. He died at Reigate on 22 January 1829. His last surviving daughter died at Brighton on 13 June 1855. (Note: Gentleman’s Magazine, 1855, ii. 331.)

== Son ==
Rymer has been conflated with his eldest son and namesake, James Rymer (1790–1876), who was baptised at Reigate on 16 June 1790 and apprenticed to surgeon-apothecaries in Guildford, and became a surgeon at Ramsgate, Kent. In 1828 he published A Treatise on Diet and Regimen, to which are added a Nosological Table, or Medical Chest Directory, Prescriptions, &c., 1828, 8vo, which he dedicated to John Abernethy. He died at Ramsgate in April 1876.

== Works ==
Rymer wrote, besides the works already noticed:

1. Introduction to the Study of Pathology on a Natural Plan, containing an Essay on Fevers, 1775, 8vo.
2. Description of the Island of Nevis, with an Account of its Principal Diseases, &c., 1776, 8vo.
3. An Essay on Medical Education, with Advice to Young Gentlemen who go into the Navy as Mates, 1776, 8vo.
4. The Practice of Navigation on a New Plan, by means of a Quadrant of the Difference of Latitude and Departure, 1778, 4to.
5. Observations and Remarks respecting the more effectual means of Preservation of Wounded Seamen and Mariners on board H.M.'s ships in Time of Action, 1780, 8vo; 2nd edit. 1782.
6. Letter on the Scurvy, 1782, 8vo.
7. Chemical Reflections relating to the Nature, Causes, Prevention, and Cure of some Diseases, particularly the Sea Scurvy, 1784, 8vo.
8. A Tract upon Indigestion and the Hypochondriac Disease, and on Atomic Gout, 1785, 8vo; 5th edit. 1789.
9. On the Nature and Symptoms of Gout, 1785, 8vo.
10. Physiological Conjectures concerning certain Functions of the Human Œconomy in Fœtus and in the Adult, 1787, 8vo.
11. A Short Account of the Method of treating Scrofular and other Glandular Affections, 1790, 8vo.
12. Essay on Pestilential Diseases, 1805, 8vo.
13. On the Nutriferous System in Men and all Creatures which have Livers, 1808, 8vo.

Rymer also contributed to the Gentleman's Magazine for June 1822 (Supplement) "Observations on Hydrophobia", for which he recommended the old remedy of immersion in cold or tepid water, with injections of the same; and he translated Analysis of the Section of the Symphysis of the Ossa Pubis, as recommended in cases of Difficult Labour and Deformed Pelvis. From the French of Alphonse Le Roy, 1783.

== Bibliography ==
- Norgate, Gerald le Grys (1897). "Rymer, James" . In Lee, Sidney (ed.). Dictionary of National Biography. Vol. 50. London: Smith, Elder & Co. p. 65.
- Norgate, G. Le G.; Herrick, Claire E. J. (2004). "Rymer, James (1750–1829), naval surgeon". In Oxford Dictionary of National Biography. Oxford: Oxford University Press.
