= Enrique Acosta =

Early 20th-century Mexican American actor

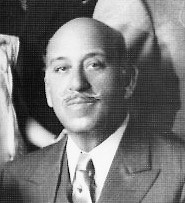
- Enrique Acosta, age 61, Los Angeles, California, 1931
- Born: 26 February 1870; Mexico City, Mexico
- Died: 22 May 1949 (aged 79); Culver City, California, United States
- Occupation: Actor
- Children: 3 sons

Enrique Acosta (26 February 1870 - 22 May 1949) was a Mexican American movie actor. He appeared in multiple films from 1925 to 1947, such as "Don Q, Son of Zorro" (1925) and "A Message to Garcia" (1936).

== Early life ==
Acosta emigrated with his family to Los Angeles, California, in the United States of America, from Mexico after 1910, to escape the violence created by the Mexican Revolution. His theater career began in Mexico, though there is not yet significant information. After he emigrated, Enrique Acosta, bilingual in English and Spanish, acted in many of Hal Roach's Spanish-language shorts in the early 20th century, as well as films where he spoke English. He lived with his three sons and wife, Josefa A Acosta, in Culver City near the Hal Roach studios. Some of his extended family resided in Playa del Rey, California—including his adult son, Joaquín Enrique Acosta Sr., and daughter in law, Catalina Ortiz Acosta, a pianist working with Juanita Roos, wife of Charles Roos in the Indianist Movement.

In the early 20th Century, Culver City was a Sundown town, making it necessary for the Acosta family to declare themselves "white" to live and work in Culver City during that time. Declaring themselves to be white on birth certificates and other public documents was common practice for many Mexican Americans in Los Angeles County during the 20th century.

== Career ==
Being bilingual in both Spanish and English, Acosta was able to obtain niche opportunities as a Latino supporting actor in the nascent Southern California film industry, Enrique Acosta was both a silent film actor then continued his acting career into "talkies", the name at the time for sound film. He was described as, "... a character actor with Mexican Indian features, a burly frame..."

Behind the camera, he was the listed film director for Hollywood, City of Dreams (Spanish:Hollywood, ciudad de ensueno) in 1931. A Spanish-language film made in the United States.

His acting roles in silent films include Don Q, Son of Zorro, a 1925 silent film by Donald Crisp, starring Douglas Fairbanks and Mary Astor, Enrique Acosta played Ramon. Whispering Sage in 1927, (he played Pedro). In a few short years, the Silent Film Era was almost completely over by 1931, pushed into oblivion by the huge success of The Lights of New York (1928) film.

Enrique Acosta worked with many early 20th Century film stars including Laurel and Hardy in many of Hal Roach Studio's Spanish-language shorts. Politiquerías is a Spanish language version feature film expanded from the English language Chickens Come Home (1931) Laurel and Hardy short film by Hal Roach Studios. He is cited as a Mexican American actor in many early Western films including The Texan.

At age 66, he played General Calixto García in A Message to Garcia (1936), starring a very young Barbara Stanwyck. In many of his film roles he usually played an authority figure such as a judge, military officer or police officer. When he wasn't an authority figure, he was an elegant guest. He had many other uncredited roles. The filmography cross-referenced with the AFI Catalog of Feature Films.

Enrique Acosta died in Culver City, California, May 22, 1949, at the age of 79. He was buried in the Holy Cross Cemetery in Culver City, California. His wife, Josefa A. de Acosta died two years later and shares the headstone. His eldest son, Joaquin Enrique Acosta Sr., also died in 1949 and is buried nearby.

== Filmography ==
Date	Film	media	Character
1925	Don Q, Son of Zorro	silent film	Ramon
1927	Whispering Sage	silent film	Old Pedro
1930	El Jugador de Golf	sound film	
1930	Tiembla y Titubea (Laurel and Hardy)	sound film	Police Chief
1930	Huye, Faldas (Laurel and Hardy)	sound film	Father
1930	Una Cana Al Aire''	sound film	Sr. Gilstrom, Charlie's boss
1930	The Texan	sound film	Sixto
1930	Ladrones (Laurel and Hardy)	sound film	Police Chief
1930	Un precio de un Beso''	sound film	
1930	Estrellados	sound film	Chamber of Commerce Pres.
1930	Locuras de Amor	sound film	
1930	Así es la Vida	sound film	Sr. Franklin
1931	Monerías	sound film	El Capitán
1931	Politiquería (Laurel and Hardy)	sound film	Judge / El Juez
1931	El Alma de a Fiesta	sound film	Senador
1931	Los Presidiarios	sound film	Warden
1931	De Bote en Bote	sound film	The Warden
1932	Thunder Below	sound film	Pacheco
1933	Dos Noches	sound film	Manuel Jiménez Blanco
1933	Una Viuda Romántica	sound film	Bartender
1934	One Night of Love	sound film	Bartender
1934	Tres Amores	sound film	Presidente
1934	The Prescott Kid	sound film	servant
1935	The Black Room	sound film	Judge
1935	El Cantante de Nápoles	sound film	Papá Daspuro
1935	Te Quiero con Lucura	sound film	Coronel
1936	A Message to Garcia	sound film	General Calixto García
1936	Fatal Lady	sound film	Paris café guest
1936	Desire	sound film	Pedro
1936	Romana	sound film	guest
1939	Only Angels Have Wings	sound film	tourist
1940	Argentine Nights	sound film	
1940	Cassablanca	sound film	uncredited character
1941	Six Lessons from Madame La Zonga	sound film	excited Cuban
1942	Crossroads	sound film	Adolph Faylauer (assoc. judge)
1946	Masquerade in Mexico	sound film	spectator
1947	Twilight on the Rio Grand	sound film	Lamplighter
