= John M. Rowan =

American politician (1829–1910)

9th Treasurer of West Virginia
- In office 1893–1897
- Governor: William A. MacCorkle
- Preceded by: William T. Thompson
- Succeeded by: M. A. Kendall

16th Speaker of the West Virginia House of Delegates
- In office 1887–1889
- Preceded by: Thomas H. Dennis
- Succeeded by: Louis Bennett

Personal details
- Born: John Madison Rowan; May 17, 1829 Craig County, Virginia, U.S.
- Died: March 13, 1910 (aged 80)
- Party: Democratic
- Spouses: Virginia Summers (m. 1855; died 1862); Susan McDaniel Tiffany (m. 1864; died 1894); Mame Bibby McIntyre (m. 1906)
- Children: 6, including Andrew

Military service
- Allegiance: Confederate States
- Branch/service: Confederate States Army; Virginia militia
- Rank: Colonel
- Unit: 108th Regiment
- Battles/wars: American Civil War

John Madison Rowan (May 17, 1829 – March 13, 1910) was an American politician. A native of Craig County, Virginia, he was about sixteen years old he came to Gap Mills, Virginia to work as a clerk for Andrew Summers. He worked there for several years until the California Gold Rush in 1849. After receiving word about this new opportunity he joined in partnership with several other man and purchased a ship at Richmond, Virginia. The ship was provisioned for two years and then set on its journey around Cape Horn and to California. It was here that John had a fair amount of success with his gold hunting. After his successful time in California he returned to Gap Mills where he married Virginia Summers in 1855. On April 23, 1857, Virginia gave birth to a son, Andrew Summers Rowan, who was named for her father. In 1860 and 1862 he was elected to the Virginia House of Delegates. He became a Democratic member of the West Virginia House of Delegates, serving as Speaker of the House from 1887 to 1889. In 1891 he was appointed to the newly created state board of agriculture and from 1893 to 1897 served as West Virginia State Treasurer. In 1904, he was a delegate to the Democratic National Convention.
