= The Texan (1930 film) =

1930 film

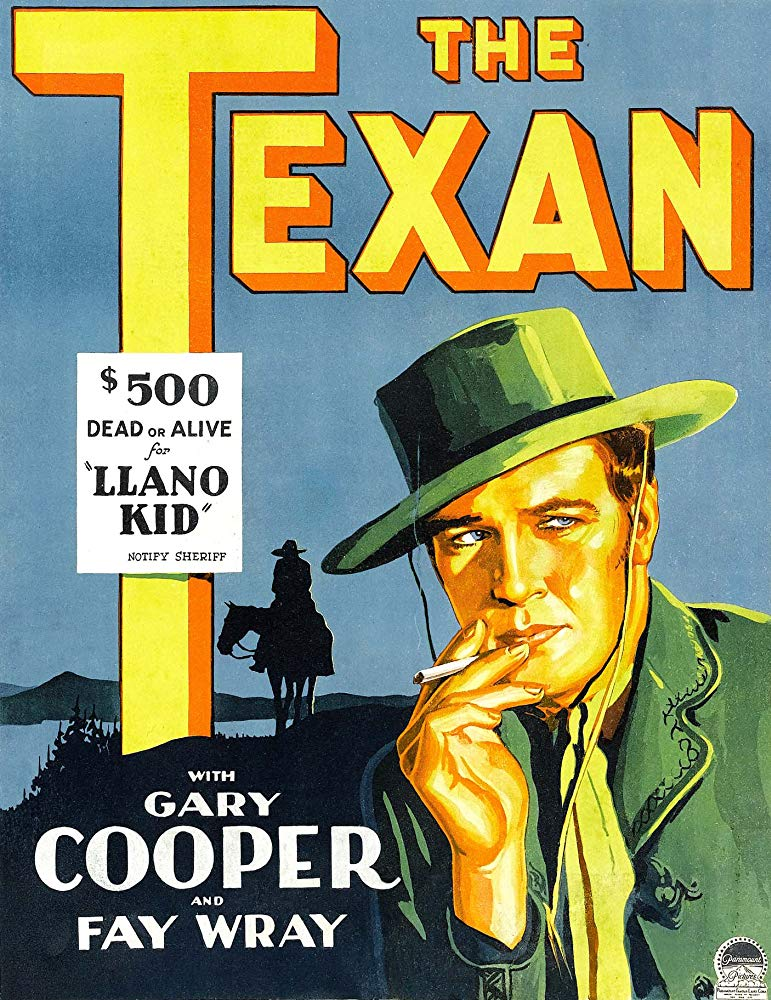
- Theatrical release poster
- Directed by: John Cromwell
- Written by: Oliver H.P. Garrett (adaptation); Victor Milner (adaptation)
- Screenplay by: Daniel Nathan Rubin
- Based on: "The Double-Dyed Deceiver" by O. Henry
- Produced by: Hector Turnbull
- Starring: Gary Cooper; Fay Wray
- Cinematography: Victor Milner
- Edited by: Verna Willis
- Production company: Paramount Pictures
- Distributed by: Paramount Pictures
- Release date: May 10, 1930 (US)
- Running time: 79 minutes; 9 reels, 7,142 ft
- Country: United States
- Language: English

The Texan is a 1930 American Western film directed by John Cromwell and starring Gary Cooper and Fay Wray. Based on the short story "The Double-Dyed Deceiver" by O. Henry, the film is about a daring bandit called the Llano Kid who shoots a young gambler in self-defense and is forced to hide from the law. He is helped by a corrupt lawyer who involves the bandit in a scheme to swindle a Mexican aristocrat whose son turns out to be the young gambler killed by the Llano Kid. The screenplay was written by Daniel Nathan Rubin, and the story was adapted for the screen by Oliver H.P. Garrett and Victor Milner. Produced by Hector Turnbull for Paramount Pictures, The Texan was released in the United States on May 10, 1930. The film received positive reviews upon its theatrical release.

== Plot ==
A young bandit called the Llano Kid is wanted by the law and has a price on his head. After seeing the local blacksmith, John Brown, a highly religious man who fancies himself a sheriff, the Kid gets into a poker game during which he notices a young gambler cheating, confronts him, and is forced to kill him in self-defense. The Kid is then pursued by Sheriff Brown and is almost apprehended, but is able to get the draw on the zealous lawman. As the Kid leaps into the saddle, Brown pledges, "God will deliver you into my hands."

Later aboard a train, the Kid meets an unscrupulous lawyer named Thacker, who convinces him to pose as the son of Señora Ibarra, a wealthy South American widow whose son Enrique disappeared 15 years earlier. Having set himself up as the widow's agent hired to find the lost son, Thacker plans to return with her "son" and swindle the widow out of her gold. Soon, the two men set sail aboard a schooner to South America, where they arrive at Señora Ibarra's family hacienda in a little seaport town of Buenas Tierras. With his basic Spanish-language skills, new sideburns, and tattooed hand (similar to Enrique's), the Kid is able to pass himself off as Enrique.

Their plans are disrupted, however, when the Kid meets and falls in love with his lovely cousin Consuelo. Softened by Señora Ibarra's affection for him and his newfound love, he begins to have second thoughts about the scheme. When the Kid learns that Señora Ibarra's son was, in fact, the man he shot in self-defense, he calls off his deal with Thacker. Angered by this turn of events, Thacker organizes a gang to steal the gold outright.

Meanwhile, Sheriff Brown arrives at Buenas Tierras, having finally tracked down the Llano Kid, who has been "delivered into his hands". He waits until nightfall before making the arrest. During the ensuing gunfight, the Kid is wounded and Thacker is killed. Afterwards, Brown has a change of heart after seeing the Kid's true character and courage. The sheriff agrees to keep the Kid's identity secret so Enrique can continue his life with his new family.

== Cast ==
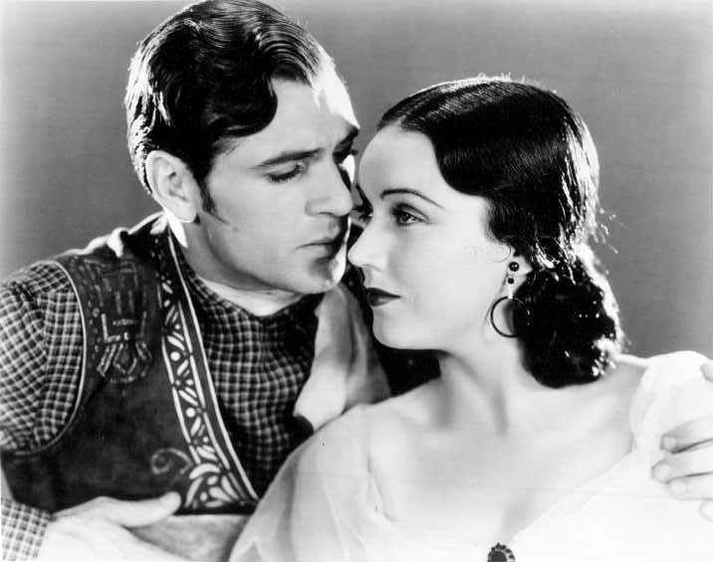
Film still with Gary Cooper and Fay Wray

- Gary Cooper as The Llano Kid
- Fay Wray as Consuelo
- Emma Dunn as Señora Doña Marguerita Ibarra
- Oscar Apfel as Thacker
- James A. Marcus as Sheriff John Brown
- Donald Reed as Nick Ibarra
- Soledad Jiménez as The Dueña
- Veda Buckland as Mary, a Nurse
- César Vanoni as Pasquale
- Ed Brady as Henry
- Enrique Acosta as Sixto
- Romualdo Tirado as Cabman

== Production ==
The Texan is based on the short story "The Double-Dyed Deceiver" by O. Henry, which was first published in Everybody's Magazine in December 1905. The story was previously filmed as A Double-Dyed Deceiver (1920) with Jack Pickford in the lead role. The railroad scenes were filmed on the Sierra Railroad in Tuolumne County, California.

== Critical response ==
In his review for The New York Times, Mordaunt Hall called the film "an expertly touched-up audible pictorial adaptation of O. Henry's story". Hall praises Cooper for his "capital acting", comparing his performance to his earlier success, The Virginian. "The lean, lanky Mr. Cooper elicits a great deal of sympathy as the double-dyed deceiver," Hall observes. He also acknowledges the supporting performances by screen veterans Oscar Apfel, the "splendid" James Marcus, the "pleasing" Emma Dunn, and Fay Wray, who "has never been more captivating than she is as Consuelo". Hall gives most of the credit for the film's success to director John Cromwell and screenwriter Oliver H. P. Garrett, who are able to balance the irony of O'Henry's original story with a love interest that is "adroitly introduced without hindering the dénouement".
