= Guisa =

- Municipality
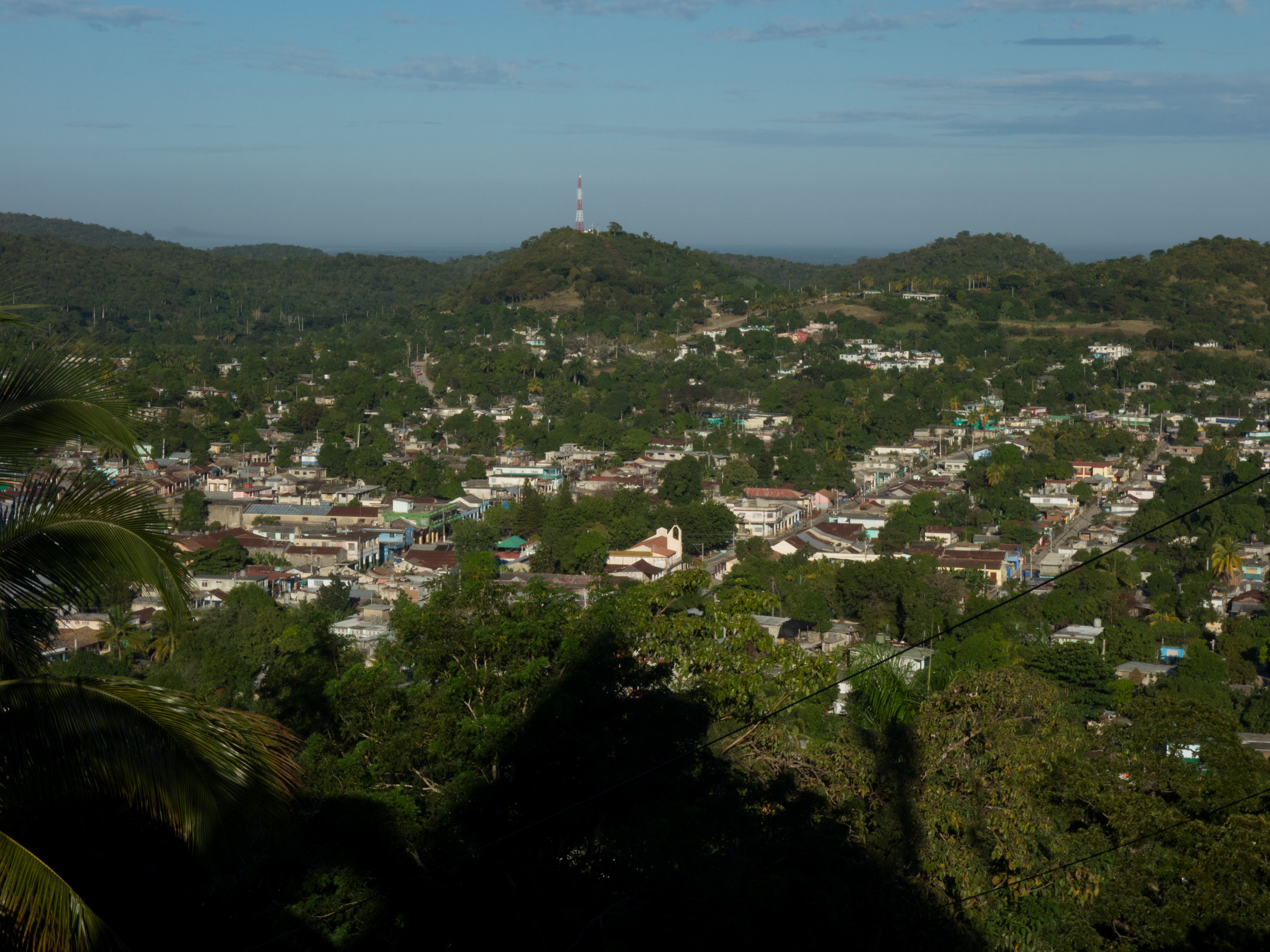
- Village of Guisa

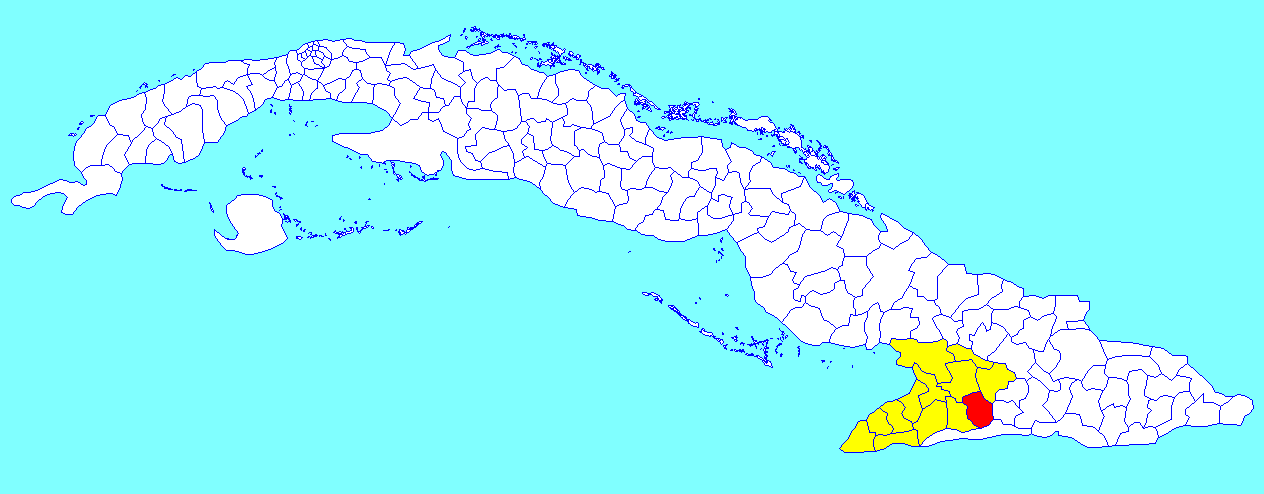
- Guisa municipality (red) within Granma Province (yellow) and Cuba
- Coordinates: 20°15′39″N 76°32′17″W
- Country: Cuba
- Province: Granma

Area
  - Total: 596 km^{2} (230 sq mi)
- Elevation: 190 m (620 ft)

Population (2022)
  - Total: 44,566
  - Density: 74.8/km^{2} (194/sq mi)
- Time zone: UTC-5 (EST)
- Area code: +53-23
- Website: https://www.guisa.gob.cu/es/

Guisa is a municipality and town in the Granma Province of Cuba. It is located 19 kilometres (12 mi) south-east of Bayamo, the provincial capital.

== Demographics ==
In 2022, the municipality of Guisa had a population of 44,566. With a total area of 596 km^{2} (230 sq mi), it has a population density of 75/km^{2} (190/sq mi).

== History ==
The town was founded in the mid-18th century, in 1765. During the last third of the 19th century, the Ten Years' War, the Little War, and the War of Independence took place here.

Being located in the eastern part of the country and very close to the Sierra Maestra, Guisa was the site of numerous military operations during this period. The most notable of these was the Capture of Guisa (1897) by the forces of Cuban Lieutenant General Calixto García.

Additionally, during the Cuban Revolution (1956-1959), the decisive rebel victory occurred in the Battle of Guisa (1958).

== Economy ==
The economy of Guisa, like that of the province to which it belongs, is primarily agricultural.

== See also ==
- Municipalities of Cuba
- List of cities in Cuba
