= Alphonse Leroy (physician) =

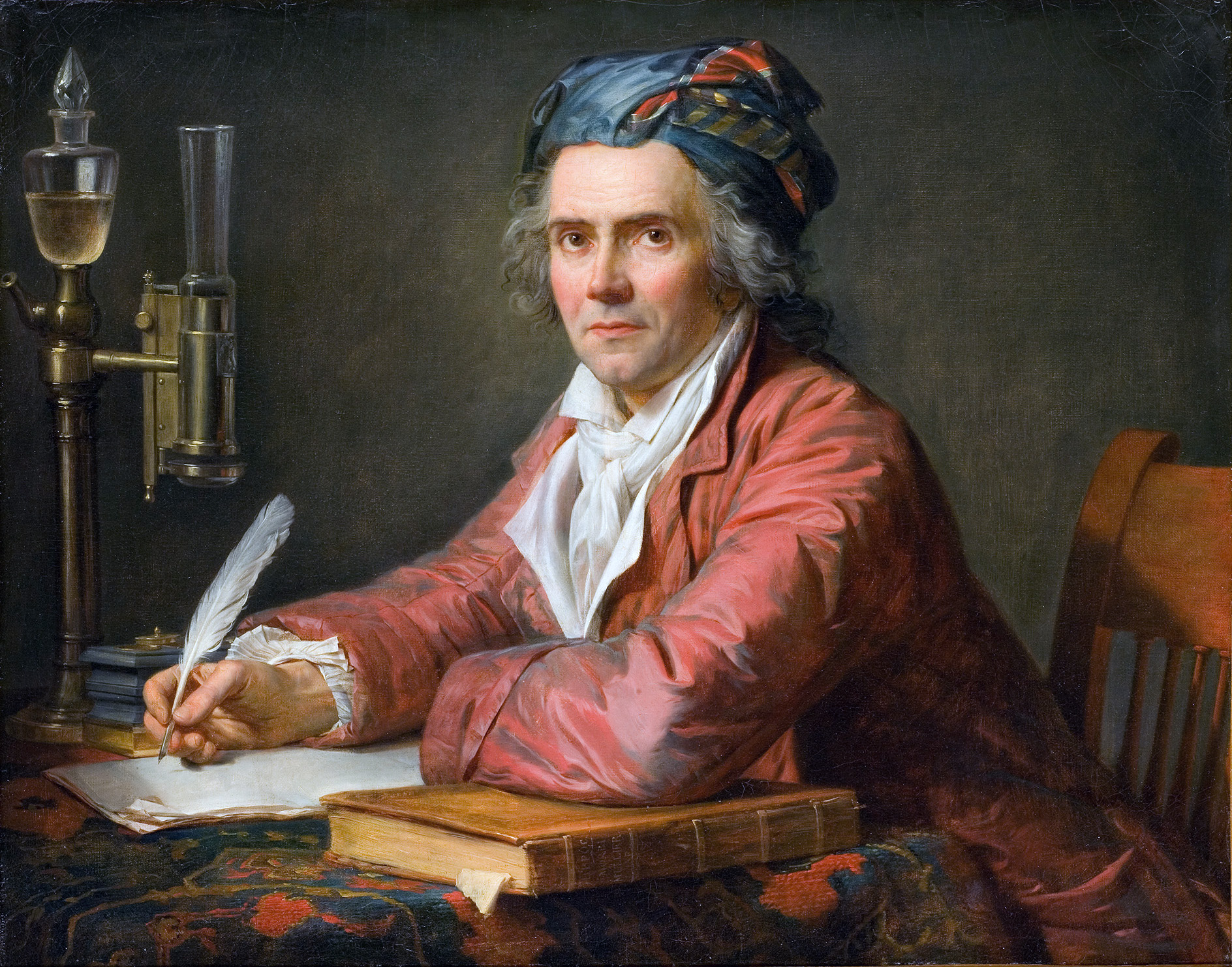
1783 Portrait of Doctor Alphonse Leroy by Jacques-Louis David

Alphonse Leroy (23 August 1742 - 15 January 1816) was a French medical doctor.

== Life ==
Born Alphonse-Louis-Vincent Leroy in Rouen, he initially studied law and wished to become a lawyer, but the fame of the Rouen-born surgeon Claude-Nicolas Lecat gave him the idea of switching to medicine. He began studying medicine with Lecat before completing his studies in Paris. He was received as a Doctor-Regent in 1768 and soon afterwards as a professor in Paris' medical faculty.

He specialised in children's and women's diseases and voiced several innovations in the teaching of midwifery. He published several works - these and his skill in public speaking gained him an appointment as professor of midwifery in the Paris school of health. He was known for his impatience, stubbornness and exaggeration in debate. According to him animal substances and especially meat were always the best food for very young children. He was also a stubborn opponent of vaccination.

He was the first to hold a chair in midwifery at the medical faculty in Paris beside Jean-Louis Baudelocque. He was best known for symphysiotomy and exploited his celebrity as the second man to perform it after its inventor Jean-René Sigault. He was murdered in Paris by a servant whom he had dismissed a few days earlier.

== Main works ==
- Recherches sur les habillements des femmes et des enfants ou Examen de la manière dont il faut vêtir l’un et l’autre sexe, Paris, 1772
- La Pratique des accouchements, Paris, 1776
- Recherches historiques et pratiques sur la section de la symphyse du pubis, Paris, 1778
- Consultation médico-légale sur la question : l’approche de certaines femmes nuit-elle à la fermentation des liqueurs ?, Paris, 1780
- Essai sur l’histoire naturelle de la grossesse et de l’accouchement, Paris, 1787
- De la nutrition et de son influence sur la forme et la fécondité des animaux sauvages et domestiques, accompagné d'un Mémoire sur l’influence de la lumière sur l’économie animale, Paris : Impr. de Crapelet, chez C.-F. Maradan, 1798, in-8°, 4-95 p.
- Leçons sur les pertes de sang pendant la grossesse, lors et à la suite des accouchements, des fausses couches, et sur toutes les hémorragies, Paris, 1803
- Manuel des goutteux et des rhumatiques, Paris, 1803
- la Médecine maternelle, ou l’Art d’élever et de conserver les enfants, Paris, 1803
- Manuel de la saignée, 1807, in-8°
- De la conservation des femmes, Paris, 1811, in-8°
- De la Contagion régnante sur les vaches, sur les bœufs et sur l’homme, en quelques contrées de la France, des causes des contagions…, Paris : Janet et Cotelle, 1814, in-8°, IV-184 p.
- De la contagion sur l’homme, sur les vaches et sur les bœufs; de ses moyens préservatifs et curatifs; considérations sur les maladies des armées; aperçu des avantages des Abattoirs dans les grandes villes, Paris : Méquignon père, 1815, in-8°, ou in-16, 15 p.

== Sources ==
- (in French) Antoine Laurent Jessé Bayle, Biographie médicale, v. 2, p. 667-8.
- (in French) Pierre Larousse, Grand Dictionnaire universel du XIXe siecle, vol. 10, Paris, Administration du grand Dictionnaire universel, p. 399.
- (in French) Florian Reynaud, Les bêtes à cornes (ou l'élevage bovin) dans la littérature agronomique de 1700 à 1850, Caen, doctoral thesis (history), 2009, appendix 2 (publications)
