= A Message to Garcia (film) =

1936 film by George Marshall

- Theatrical release poster
- Directed by: George Marshall
- Screenplay by: W.P. Lipscomb and Gene Fowler; Sam Hellman (uncredited); Gladys Lehman (uncredited)
- Based on: Suggested by Elbert Hubbard's immortal essay and the book by Lieut. Andrew S. Rowan
- Produced by: Raymond Griffith (associate producer)
- Starring: Wallace Beery; Barbara Stanwyck; John Boles; Alan Hale; Mona Barrie; Herbert Mundin
- Cinematography: Rudolph Maté, A.S.C.
- Edited by: Herbert Levy
- Music by: Louis Silvers (musical direction)
- Production company: A Darryl F. Zanuck Twentieth Century Production
- Distributed by: 20th Century Fox
- Release date: April 10, 1936
- Running time: 85 minutes
- Country: United States
- Languages: English; Spanish

A Message to Garcia is a 1936 American adventure spy film directed by George Marshall and starring Wallace Beery, Barbara Stanwyck and John Boles.

== Plot ==
In 1898, Andrew S. Rowan is a first lieutenant in the U.S. Army. The United States had just declared war on Spain, starting the Spanish-American War. At this time, Cuba is a Spanish colony. President McKinley personally sends Rowan on a secret mission to Cuba. He wants him to deliver a letter to General Calixto García, the leader of the Cuban resistance to Spain.

Traveling undercover, Rowan first sails to British Jamaica. Posing as a Canadian merchant sailor, he joins the crew of a neutral British ship that is sailing to Cuba. However, the Spanish have already learned about the McKinley letter. They hire Dr. Ivan Krug to identify the American carrying it and stop him before he can reach Garcia. Krug takes passage on Rowan's ship and starts questioning everyone on board. Fearful of being uncovered, Rowan jumps ship at night off the Cuban coast and takes a row boat to shore.

At this point, Krug knows that Rowan is the courier. He and a Spanish patrol track Rowan to a cafe in Cuba. Rowan has hidden the letter in his belt. A fight ensues and Rowan is knocked unconscious. However, he is rescued from Krug by a Sergeant Dory, a conniving deserter from the U.S. Marine Corps. Dory spots the letter and reads it. When Rowan revives, Dory offers for 100 gold pieces to take him to the Maderas plantation. Old man Maderas' son is an aide to Garcia.

However, when they arrive at the plantation, they witness Spanish soldiers executing Maderas by firing squad. and kill the man. After the Spanish depart, Madera's daughter Lila arrives. She offers to take two men to Garcia, while warning Rowan that Dory is only interested in money.

Aided by villages of Cuban patriots, Rowan, Dory and Lila make their way to Garcia. Spanish troops led by Krug remain constantly on their trail, forcing the group to hide in the swamp. While there, they encounter Henry Piper, a British merchant from Sheffield, England, who has become lost. The Spanish catch up with the group and wound Lila as they run away.

Dory removes the bullet from Maderos. Rowan wants Dory to stay behind with her to provide care and protection. However, she says that Dory must guide Rowan, believing that his letter is more important than any one of their lives. The Spanish later capture Lila.

Dory successfully guides Rowan across an alligator-infested river and past Spanish patrols, delivering him to what he believes is Garcia's camp. Dory then departs. However, it was a trap; the Spanish had recently captured the camp. Before being apprehended, Rowan stuffs the Mckinley letter into the barrel of his handgun. Krug begins to torture Rowan to get the letter.

Meanwhile, Garcia and the rebels have captured Dory. He previously cheated them on an ammunition sale and Garcia wants to execute him. Dory's appeals to Garcia for help to rescue Rowan. Garcia refuses. At that point, Piper arrives in the new rebel camp and verifies Dory's story. Garcia and Dory then organize a rescue attempt for Rowan.

Krug has tortured Rowan, he has refused to give them the location of the message. The Spanish bring in Lila; she tries to persuade Rowan to end his suffering and reveal the message. Rowan still refuses. At that point, Garcia and Dory attack the Spanish camp. During the battle, Rowan and Lila are freed, but Dory is killed. At the end of the film, Rowan removes the McKinley letter from his handgun and gives it to Garcia. After reading it, Garcia tells Rowan and Lila ."This message means the liberation of our people."

== Cast ==
- Wallace Beery as Sergeant Dory
- Barbara Stanwyck as Senorita Raphaelita Maderos
- John Boles as Lieutenant Rowan
- Alan Hale as Dr. Krug
- Herbert Mundin as Henry Piper
- Mona Barrie as Spanish Spy
- Enrique Acosta as General Garcia
- Juan Torena as Luis Maderos
- Martin Garralaga as Rodriguez
- Blanca Vischer as Chiquita
- Jose Luis Tortosa as Pasquale Castova
- Lucio Villegas as Commandant
- Frederick Vogeding as German Stoker
- Pat Moriarity as Irish Stoker
- Octavio Giraud as Spanish Commandant

=== Uncredited ===
- Warren Hymer as Sailor departing from Brooklyn Navy Yard
  saying goodbye to his girlfriend
- Sam Appel as Proprietor
- Romualdo Tirado as Soldier
- Yorke Sherwood as Dakin
- Carlos Montalbán as Spanish gunner
- George Irving as Colonel Wagner
- Dell Henderson as President McKinley
- John Carradine as voice of President McKinley

== Production ==
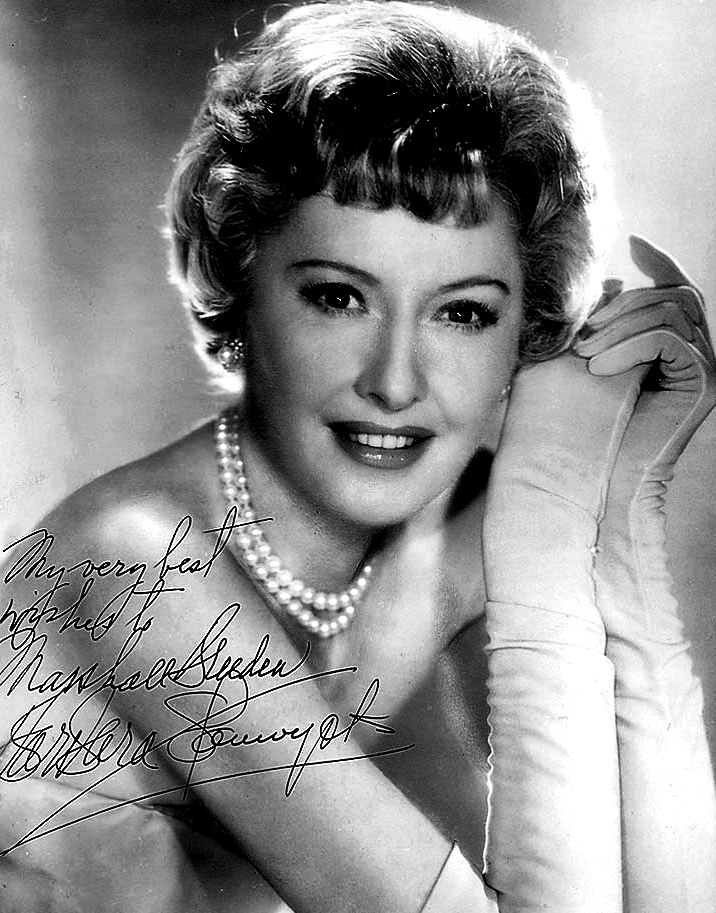
Barbara Stanwyck as Raphaelita Maderos

A Message to Garcia was inspired by the 1899 essay "A Message to Garcia" by Elbert Hubbard. The essay was loosely based on an incident happening during the ramp up to the Spanish–American War. The essay had previously been adapted into a 1916 silent film of the same name. In the story, U.S. Army Lieutenant Rowan, under cover, carries a secret message from President McKinley to General García, the leader of a rebellion against Spanish rule on the island of Cuba.

The 1936 A Message to Garcia was produced by Twentieth Century Pictures, but was distributed by 20th Century Fox following the merger between the two studios. The final day of filming was November 16, 1935. Twentieth Century Pictures had developed a reputation for producing high-budget prestige films, and A Message to Garcia was one of the company's final efforts. The parts of Dory and Raphaelita are fictional and were created for Beery and Stanwyck, both well-established box office stars. The British comedian Herbert Mundin appeared as Piper to add comic relief. Dell Henderson plays President William McKinley, but the character's stentorian voice was dubbed by John Carradine.

Before the film's release, the Government of Spain intimated that they might ban all 20th Century Fox films from Spain if A Message to Garcia was defamatory of their nation.
