= José Manuel Capote =

Cuban general and politician (1836–1934)

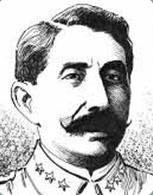
- Born: September 16, 1836; Bayamo, Oriente, Cuba
- Died: November 11, 1934 (aged 98); Location Unknown
- Relatives: Gonzalo Capote (brother)
- Military career
- Allegiance: Cuba
- Branch: Cuban Liberation Army
- Service years: 1868–1878; 1895–1898
- Rank: Major General
- Conflicts: Ten Years' War: Capture of Bayamo; Battle of Naranjo-Mojacasabe; Battle of Las Guásimas; Capture of Guáimaro; Second Battle of Las Tunas; Cuban War of Independence: Circular Campaign; Second Eastern Campaign

José Manuel Capote Sosa (1836–1934) was a Cuban Major General and politician who participated in the Cuban War of Independence. He was known as the mayor of Bayamo and the brother of Colonel Gonzalo Capote of the Cuban Liberation Army.

== Early years ==
Cuban historian and journalist Jorge Martín Quintana states that he was born on September 16, 1836, and according to his personal file corresponding to the Liberation Army records, he was born in Bayamo, Oriente. He was the son of Manuel Antonio Capote and María Josefa Sosa, both originating from La Palma, Canary Islands. He had at least five brothers: Gonzalo, Rafael, José Joaquín, Fernando and Francisco. All of them would also participate in the Cuban War of Independence alongside José.

== Ten Years' War ==
On October 13, 1868, he joined the Cuban Liberation Army in Holguín with Luis Figueredo. He participated in the Capture of Bayamo between October 18 and 20 of the same year. Later, on February 10, 1874, he fought in the army of Major General Máximo Gómez in the Battle of Naranjo-Mojacasabe. This was followed, between March 15 and 19 of that year, by the Battle of Las Guásimas. He was appointed Lieutenant Colonel in 1875. In 1876, within the Bonilla Regiment, he achieved distinctions in the Capture of Guáimaro on January 3, the Second Battle of Las Tunas between September 23 and 26 and Guisa.

== Little War ==
He later participated in the Little War where, in August 1879, he was captured by the Spanish Army, who locked him up in the prisons of Chafarinas, Cádiz for four years. In 1890, he participated in the failed conspiracy known as the Peace of Manganeso.

== Cuban War of Independence ==
During the Cuban War of Independence, he led 40 soldiers in an area located between Cauto el Paso and Bayamon, later joining the army of Major General Bartolomé Masó in Corralillo, near Guisa. On February 24, 1895, he was promoted to Colonel. On April 1, 1895, he fought at Los Moscones. On June 6, he started the Circular Campaign, fighting in it in its first stage and he was promoted to Brigadier General on June 5, 1895.

The Circular Campaign was followed in the same year by his fights in Altagracia (June 14), La Ceja (June 16), El Mulato (June 19) and San Jerónimo (June 22). But then on July 1 of that year, he had to return to Las Tunas, under the orders of Máximo Gómez whose army he belonged to since the beginning of the Cuban War of Independence, after which on August 11, 1895, he would fight in the Battle de Sao Claro.

The actions he carried out during the Campaign contributed to the invading column, led by Major General Antonio Maceo, passing the torch from Júcaro to Morón.

In February 1896, he led the Third Division of the Second Army Corps, fighting at Las Tunas and western Holguín. On August 29, 1896, he was promoted to Major General.

He was part of the army of Major General Calixto García between October 1896 and April 1898. Thus, during his stay in this army, he fought in Guáimaro (between October 17 and 28, 1896), Jiguaní (October 12, March 1897), Las Tunas 1 (between August 28 and 30, 1897, when he was promoted to Major General), Guisa (November 28, 1897), and in the Battle of Bayamón (April 28, 1898, occupying the towns of San Miguel, Maniabón and Puerto Padre the following month. Between August 16 and 17, 1898 he fought in the last combat of the military campaign, the Battle of Auras.

== Final years ==
After the war ended and Cuba was militarily occupied by the United States, the new American military government in Cuba appointed him Warden of the Prison of Santiago de Cuba. Capote was also the mayor of Bayamo .

Contrary to the policies of President Mario García Menocal, he rebelled against his re-election in February 1917. According to the Canarian journalist Luis Felipe Gómez Wangüemert, a few weeks before his death he was decorated with the Grand Cross of Carlos Manuel de Céspedes. He died on November 11, 1934, in Bayamo.

== Personal life ==
José Manuel Capote had at least two children: Enrique and Miguel Capote Frías. Both also participated in the War of Independence from its beginning to its end, achieving the ranks of Commander and Sergeant respectively.
