= A Message to Garcia =

1899 essay by Elbert Hubbard

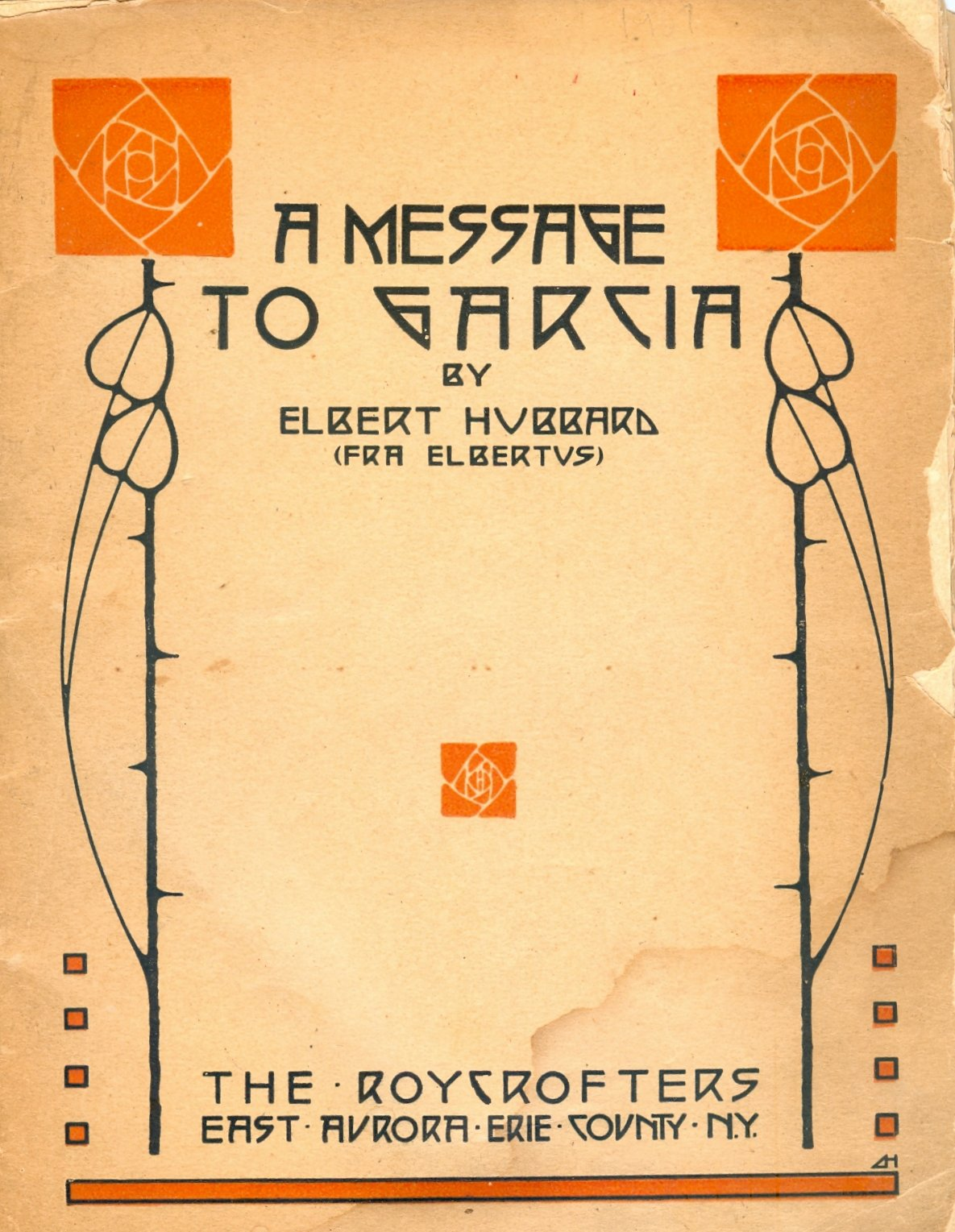
- Author: Elbert Hubbard
- Language: English
- Genre: Literature
- Publisher: The Roycrofters
- Publication date: 1899
- Publication place: United States
- Media type: Print (Hardcover, Paperback, E-Book)
- Pages: 42
- ISBN: 978-1-61720-215-5

A Message to Garcia is a widely distributed essay written by Elbert Hubbard in 1899, expressing the value of individual initiative and conscientiousness in work. The essay's primary example is a dramatized version of a daring escapade performed by an American soldier, First Lieutenant Andrew S. Rowan, just before the Spanish–American War. The essay describes Rowan carrying a message from President William McKinley to "Gen. Calixto García, a leader of the Cuban insurgents somewhere in the mountain fastnesses of Cuba—no one knew where". The essay contrasts Rowan's self-driven effort against "the imbecility of the average man—the inability or unwillingness to concentrate on a thing and do it".

The point I wish to make is this: McKinley gave Rowan a letter to be delivered to Garcia; Rowan took the letter and did not ask, "Where is he at?" By the Eternal! there is a man whose form should be cast in deathless bronze and the statue placed in every college of the land. It is not book-learning young men need, nor instruction about this and that, but a stiffening of the vertebrae which will cause them to be loyal to a trust, to act promptly, concentrate their energies: do the thing—"Carry a message to Garcia!"

== Publication history ==
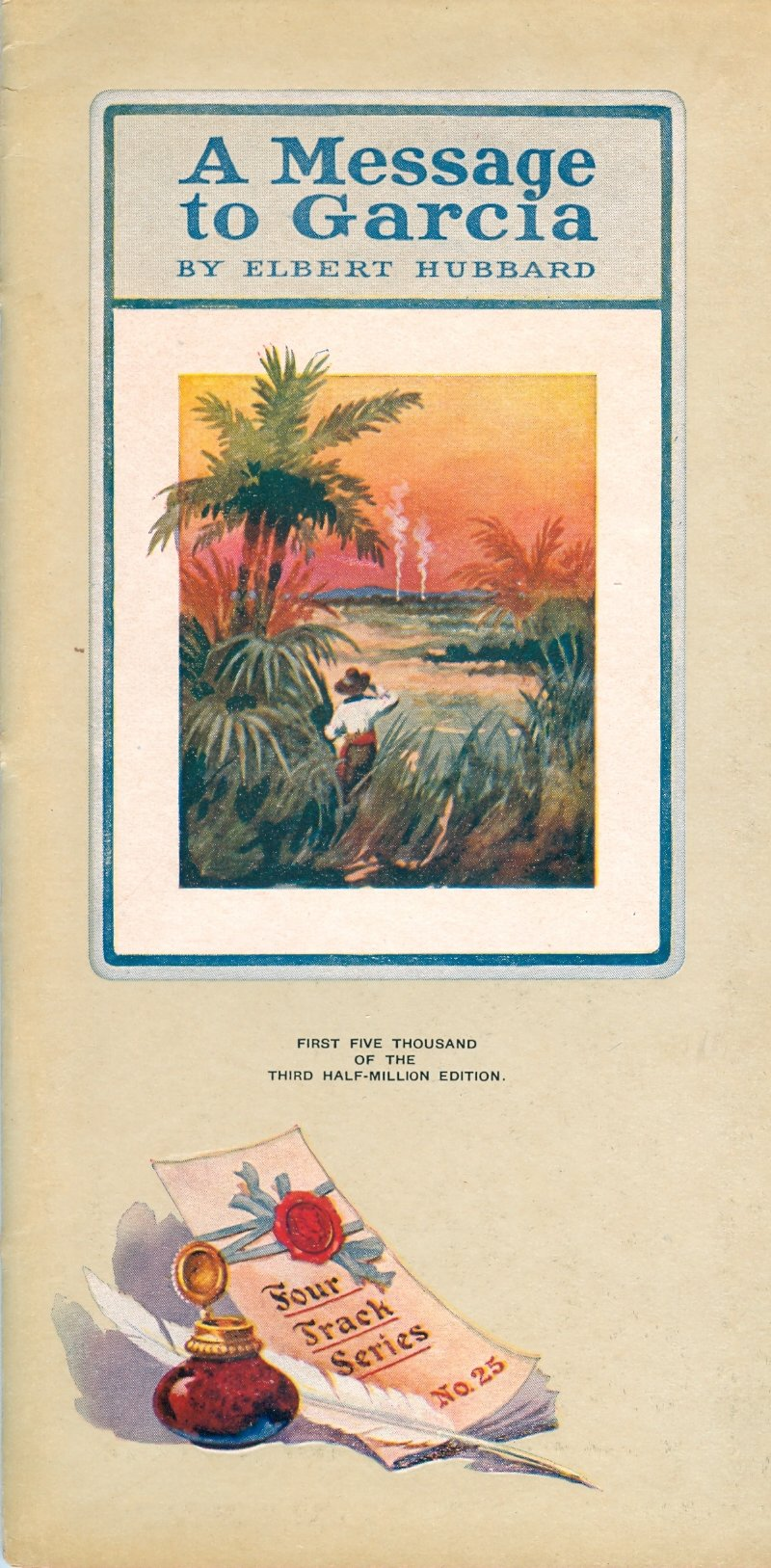
A Message to Garcia, New York central edition

A Message to Garcia was originally published as filler without a title in the March 1899 issue of The Philistine, a periodical which, at that time, was written entirely by Hubbard. His complaints about lazy and incompetent workers struck a chord with many corporate executives. One of these was George H. Daniels, a promotion-minded executive with the New York Central Railroad. Daniels reprinted the essay hundreds of thousands of times as part of the railroad's Four-Track Series of pamphlets. Hubbard's Roycroft Press, the publishing arm of an arts and crafts community he founded in East Aurora, New York, reprinted and sold the essay in a variety of bindings—suede, embossed, paperback, and so on—and as paid promotional literature for organizations as disparate as Wanamaker's department store, the Boy Scouts of America, and the United States Navy. It was also reprinted in many anthologies of inspirational literature. Modern editions are readily available today on the Internet.

== Historical accuracy ==
In Hubbard's version of Rowan's journey, President McKinley needed to communicate with Gen. Calixto Garcia, a leader of the Cuban insurgents.

[S]omeone said to the president there was 'a fellow by the name of Rowan will find Garcia for you if anybody can.' Rowan was sent for and given a letter to be delivered to Garcia. How the 'fellow by the name of Rowan' took the letter, sealed it up in an oilskin pouch, strapped it over his heart, in four days landed by night off the coast of Cuba from an open boat, disappeared into the jungle, and in three weeks came out on the other side of the Island, having traversed a hostile country on foot, and delivered his letter to Garcia – are things I have no special desire now to tell in detail.

In fact, the only true statement Hubbard wrote was that Rowan "landed...off the coast of Cuba from an open boat". All the rest, including McKinley's need to communicate with Garcia and Rowan's delivery of a letter to the general, was false.

It was Maj. Arthur L. Wagner, head of the Military Information Division, who successfully petitioned Adj. Gen. Henry Clark Corbin for permission to send spies to Cuba and Puerto Rico to gather military information. Wagner selected 40-year-old 1st Lt. Andrew S. Rowan to join García, who led the rebel forces in eastern Cuba. On April 9, Rowan, posing as a civilian, boarded a steamer in New York bound for Kingston, Jamaica. With the help of the U.S. consul in Kingston, he connected with the Cuban Revolutionary Junta, some of whose members transported him by open boat during one of their trips to the southeastern coast of Cuba. They went ashore the morning of April 25.

Following an eight-day horseback journey with rebels through the Sierra Maestra Mountains, Rowan met with García in the city of Bayamo on May 1. Rowan's assignment was to keep the War Department informed as to "the strength, efficiency, movements and general military situation". His orders were to stay in Cuba, to "accompany the Insurgent Forces, and to send back dispatches". Disregarding his orders, Rowan said he was there to learn what García needed to cooperate with the U.S. armed forces during a possible invasion. He added that he was eager to return to the U.S. García, seeing an opportunity, sent him back to the U.S. within hours of his arrival. Traveling with him were members of García's staff to confer with U.S. officials. After a five-day horseback journey to Manatí Bay on Cuba's north coast, they "drew a little cockle-shell of a boat from under a mangrove bush" and set sail for Florida. A passing sponging steamer carried them to Nassau, and from there they eventually sailed to Tampa, arriving on May 13.

Rowan had no sooner landed in Cuba on April 25 than details of his secret mission were splashed across the pages of America's newspapers. It was learned that, while in Jamaica, Rowan had revealed this information to an Associated Press correspondent named Elmer Roberts. This was not what Adj. Gen. Corbin anticipated. Had the news reports not made Rowan a popular hero, however falsely, Corbin might have had him court-martialed. Instead he was deemed as popular as Buffalo Bill, lauded by Maj. Gen Nelson A. Miles, commanding general of the army, and temporarily promoted to lieutenant-colonel in the 6th Regiment Volunteer Infantry.

== Exaggerated circulation claims ==
In 1914, Hubbard claimed the essay had been reprinted over 40 million times. His son Bert later reported 80 million times, and in a 1926 bill to promote Andrew Summers Rowan to major general, retired, it was stated there were 225 million copies printed. In their 1977 survey of best sellers, Alice Hackett and James H. Burke estimated a circulation of four million. Since then there has been an uncounted—and uncountable—number of copies, particularly if every digital copy is included, but no one has yet been able to prove a circulation of 40 million. In an oft-repeated story, Hubbard wrote that when "Mr. Daniels [of the NY Central] was distributing the Message to Garcia, Prince Hilakoff (Mikhail Khilkov), Director of Russian Railways, was in this country...and made a tour of the country under the personal direction of Mr. Daniels....When he got home he had the Message to Garcia translated into Russian, and a copy of the booklet given to every railroad employee in Russia," apparently unaware that at that time a large percentage of Russian railroad workers were illiterate. Hubbard further claimed that "[D]uring the Russo-Japanese War, every soldier who went to the front was given a copy." The Japanese found the pamphlet on Russian prisoners of war, had it translated, and the "Mikado" ordered a copy given "to every man in the employ of the Japanese government, soldier or civilian". The narrative is false: Khilkov was in the U.S. in October 1896, long before the essay was written, and only occasionally was he in the company of Daniels. Not a single copy of the purported Russian or Japanese government-issued pamphlets has been found. When Hubbard was writing about the Russian and Japanese translations, he also declared that the pamphlet traveled from Russia to "Germany, France, Spain, Turkey, Hindustan, and China", and claimed that the essay had been translated into "all written languages". That has yet to be demonstrated; however, it can today be found in many recent translations: Czech, German, Romanian, Chinese, Korean, and other languages.

== In popular culture ==
The phrase "to carry a message to Garcia" was in common use for years to indicate taking initiative when carrying out a difficult assignment. Richard Nixon can be heard using it on the Watergate tapes during conversations with Henry Kissinger and John Ehrlichman. It has also been used as the title of children's games and dramatized on radio shows, and it was tailor-made for the Boy Scouts of America. A passage in the 1917 Boy Scouts Yearbook emphasizes the connection: "If you give [a Boy Scout] a 'Message to Garcia' you know that message will be delivered, although the mountains, the wilderness, the desert, the torrents, the broad lagoons or the sea itself, separate him from 'Garcia'."

There have been two movies based on the essay, both titled A Message to Garcia. The first, a silent movie made in 1916 by Thomas A. Edison, Inc., was directed by Richard Ridgely and featured Robert Conness, Mabel Trunnelle, and Charles Sutton. As noted on the Turner Classic Movie site, "accuracy was not really a concern". The second film was produced in 1936 by Twentieth Century Fox and directed by George Marshall. It featured John Boles as Andrew Rowan, Wallace Beery, Barbara Stanwyck, Alan Hale, Herbert Mundin, Mona Barrie, and Enrique Acosta as Garcia—an "agreeable embroidery" according to Leslie Halliwell.
