= Andrew Summers Rowan =

United States Army officer (1857–1943)

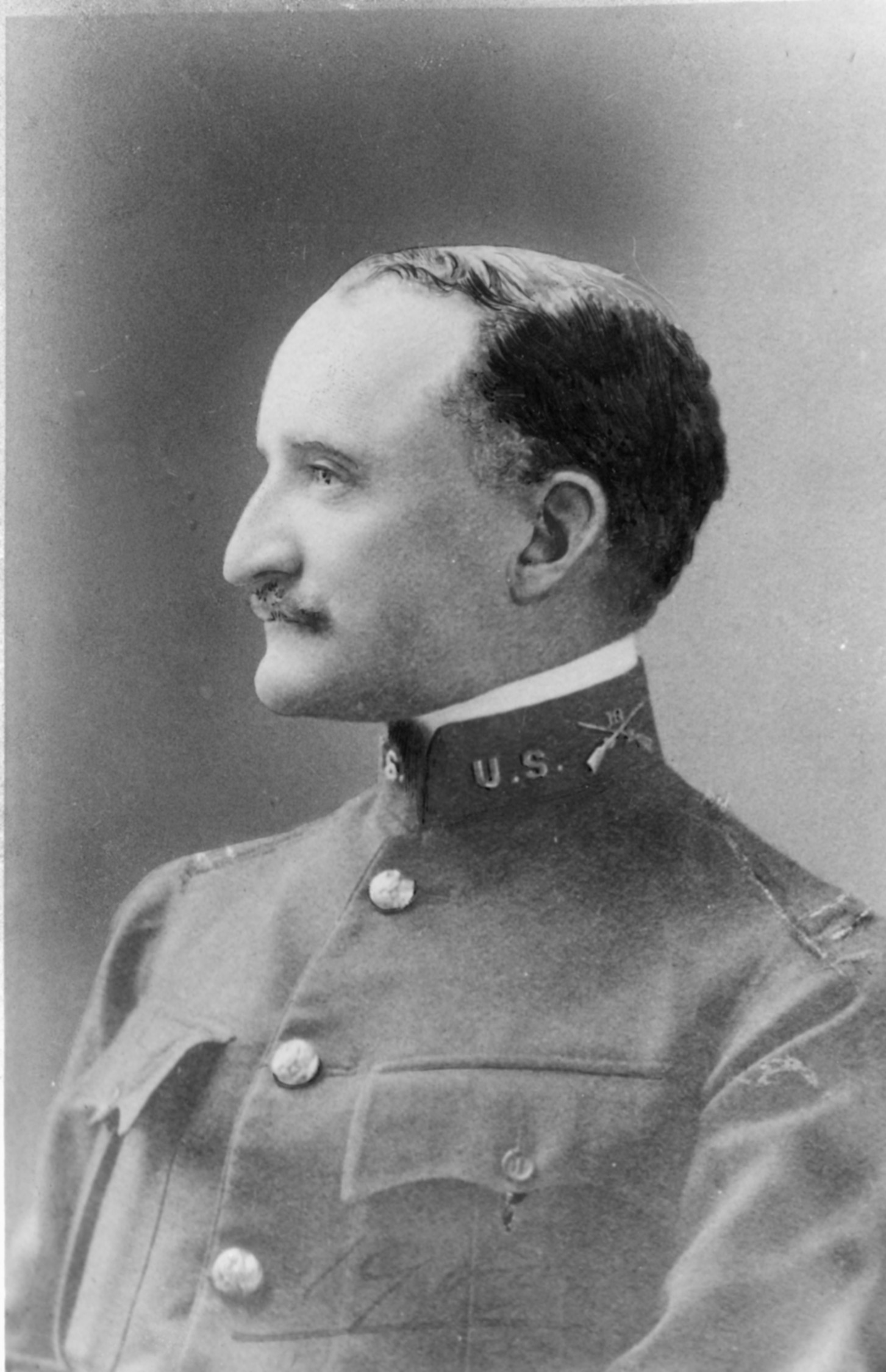
- Rowan c. 1904
- Born: April 23, 1857; Gap Mills, Virginia
- Died: January 10, 1943 (aged 85); The Presidio, San Francisco, California
- Burial place: Arlington National Cemetery, Arlington, Virginia
- Military career
- Allegiance: United States
- Branch: United States Army
- Rank: Lieutenant Colonel
- Conflicts: Spanish–American War, Philippine War, Moro Rebellion

Andrew Summers Rowan (April 23, 1857 – January 10, 1943) was born in Gap Mills, Virginia (now West Virginia), the son of John M. Rowan and Virginia Summers. He was an American army officer who served in the Spanish–American War, the Philippine War, and the Moro Rebellion, and became famous for reportedly delivering a message to Gen. Calixto Garcia in Cuba.

== Early career ==
Rowan enrolled in the United States Military Academy at West Point in 1877 at the age of twenty and was commissioned second lieutenant in 1881. For the next ten years he was assigned to several frontier posts and in 1887 married Ida M. Symns of Atchison, Kansas. While serving as a topographical officer at Fort Pembina, North Dakota, he volunteered for reconnaissance service along the Canadian border. In 1891 he was assigned as barometric hypsometrist and assistant astronomer with the Intercontinental Railway Survey, which was planning a (never-completed) rail line through Guatemala. After his return he was appointed head of the Military Information Division (MID) Map Section in Washington, D.C.. While serving in this capacity he co-authored a well-received book about Cuba.

== Spanish–American War ==
Following the explosion of the USS Maine in Havana Harbor on February 15, 1898, war between the United States and Spain, which then ruled Cuba, seemed inevitable. Maj. Arthur L. Wagner, head of the Military Information Division, successfully petitioned Adj. Gen. Henry Clark Corbin for permission to send spies to Cuba and Puerto Rico to gather military information. Wagner selected forty-year-old 1st Lt. Andrew S. Rowan to join Gen. Calixto García, commander of the rebel forces in eastern Cuba. Rowan, posing as a civilian, boarded a steamer in New York bound for Kingston, Jamaica. As a cover story, he carried papers designating him as a military attaché bound for Santiago, Chile. (The inclusion of this cover story in official documents has understandably led some to believe, incorrectly, that it was true. In fact, Rowan never set foot in Chile.) With the help of the U.S. consul in Kingston, he connected with the Cuban Revolutionary Junta, some of whose members transported him by open boat during one of their trips to the southeastern coast of Cuba. They went ashore the morning of April 25.

Following an eight-day horseback journey with rebels through the Sierra Maestra mountains, Rowan met with García in the city of Bayamo on May 1. Rowan's assignment was to keep the War Department informed as to "the strength, efficiency, movements and general military situation." His orders were to stay in Cuba, to "accompany the Insurgent Forces, and to send back dispatches." Disregarding his orders, Rowan said he was there to gather information regarding García's needs in order for him to cooperate with the U.S. armed forces; he said also that he was eager to return to the U.S. García, seeing an opportunity, sent him back to the U.S. within hours of his arrival. Traveling with him were members of García's staff to confer with U.S. officials. After a five-day journey to Manatí Bay on Cuba's north coast they "drew a little cockle-shell of a boat from under a mangrove bush" and set sail for Florida. A passing sponging steamer carried them to Nassau, and from there they eventually sailed to Tampa, arriving on May 9.

Rowan had no sooner landed in Cuba on April 25 than details of his secret mission were splashed across the pages of America's newspapers. It was learned that while in Jamaica Rowan had revealed this information to an Associated Press correspondent named Elmer Roberts. This was not what Adj. Gen. Corbin anticipated. Had the news reports not made Rowan a popular hero, however falsely, Corbin might have had him court-martialed. Instead he was deemed as popular as Buffalo Bill, lauded by Maj. Gen Nelson A. Miles, commanding general of the army, and temporarily promoted to lieutenant-colonel in the 6th Regiment Volunteer Infantry.

The United States declared war on Spain on April 25 and invaded Cuba on June 22. Less than two months later, Spain signed a protocol effectively ending the war. It officially ended with the signing of the Treaty of Paris on December 10, 1898. On August 22, under orders from Miles, Rowan and another officer began a horseback inspection tour of Cuba that lasted six weeks and resulted in a highly detailed report.

== Philippine War ==
By defeating Spain, the U.S. acquired a number of colonies, including the Philippine archipelago. The Filipinos, thinking the U.S. was freeing them from the Spanish, did not care to be ruled by yet another foreign power. They resisted U.S. control, and thus began the Philippine War (1899–1902). Now a captain, Andrew S. Rowan was assigned to Iloilo to take part as commander of the First Battalion of the 19th Infantry Regiment. He was sent to the island of Cebu in early September to assist in reconnaissance and gathering intelligence, where he was assigned to the subdistrict of Bogo. During this period he was involved in various expeditions and engagements with local insurgents, suffering a wound during one action.

While he was assigned as the leader of a garrison in Bogo, the US Army's headquarters in northern Cebu, he wrote a 82-page manuscript titled Conquest of Cebu, detailing military tactics on the attack on Sudlon from late July 1899 to early January 1900. Sudlon was a barrio and a fortress used by the Philippine army in Cebu.

He began writing shortly after the capture of Sudlon and submitted the essay, included with maps and photographs, to The Century Magazine in October 1900, but it was not published, He used the materials to supplement his teaching on military tactics until his retirement in 1909.

The materials he collected during his service in the Philippines were given to the Hoover Institution Library and Archives.

In December 1900 a detachment of 21 men led by Rowan was sent to the nearby island of Bohol to repair telephone lines. While traversing a deep cut, they were ambushed by bolo-wielding Boholanos. Three men were killed and five wounded. Rowan later returned to Bohol with 175 men of Company I, this time to occupy the village of Jagna. On April 29 one of his men was murdered by a Filipino in native dress who, it seemed, had intended to assassinate Rowan. The men of Company I responded by killing the man on the spot along with five other unarmed locals, and eventually burning many native homes. This resulted in renewed anti-American activity for which Rowan was held responsible. In the end he was found innocent of any malfeasance, and on May 28, 1902, when the war was all but over, he embarked for the U.S.

== Post-Philippine War ==
On September 12, 1902, Rowan reported for duty at Kansas State Agricultural College and Applied Sciences (now Kansas State University) in Manhattan, Kansas, to teach Military Science and Tactics. But he had acquired a serious drinking problem, and, as a direct result of a complaint from the local W.C.T.U. to President Theodore Roosevelt, he was relieved of his post. He then served as an umpire during war games at West Point, Kentucky, and Fort Riley, Kansas. His wife died on New Year's Eve, 1903, and Rowan took up duties at the Vancouver Barracks in Washington. In spite of continued incidents of intemperance, he was selected by Brig. Gen. Frederick Funston to assist in the selection of a local site for future maneuvers and to again serve as an umpire. It was during this period that he met and married Josephine Morris de Greayer, a wealthy clubwoman of San Francisco.

== Moro Rebellion ==
Having reestablished his reputation, Rowan was promoted to major and assigned command of the 1st Battalion, 15th Infantry Regiment at Camp Keithley on the island of Mindanao in the Philippines. He was there to participate in the so-called Moro Rebellion (1902–1913), an armed conflict between indigenous ethnic groups and the U.S. His wife accompanied him and remained on Mindanao throughout his entire tour of duty. The two of them returned to the U.S. in June 1907.

== Retirement and death ==
After various assignments in New York, Utah, and Wyoming, Rowan retired on December 1, 1909, and spent his final years in San Francisco and Mill Valley, California, where his fame lived on. He continued writing and speaking about his Cuban adventure, embellishing it over the years. Andrew Summers Rowan died at the Letterman Army Hospital in San Francisco on January 10, 1943, and is buried in Arlington National Cemetery.

== Rowan's fame ==
Andrew Rowan would have faded from history had it not been for Elbert Hubbard, publisher of The Philistine, a monthly periodical. In March, 1899, Hubbard published an essay praising Rowan for having dutifully completed his assignment to carry a message from President McKinley to General García. This was totally inaccurate, as was every other detail Hubbard wrote regarding Rowan's mission. There was, in fact, no message to García from McKinley; furthermore, Rowan had not completed his assignment. Yet, Hubbard's fictional account was almost universally believed. By the time Rowan left for the Philippines he was hailed everywhere as a hero. The people in Atchison, Kansas, birthplace of his wife, held a gigantic celebration to honor his daring deed. Even the Kansas governor was in attendance.

Movies depicting the journey were released by Thomas Edison (1916) and 20th Century Fox (1936). Both films, entitled "A Message to Garcia", were based on Elbert Hubbard's essay, but bore as little resemblance to the essay as the essay did to Rowan's actual adventure. Through the years, scores of newspaper and magazine articles recounted the famous journey. With rare exceptions, most were merely repetitions of Hubbard's fabrication. The essay, still in print today, has been reprinted in countless editions and translated into many languages.

== Honors and memorials ==
In 1922 Rowan was awarded the Distinguished Service Cross for "delivering a message to General Garcia [and securing] secret information . . . [that] had an important bearing on the quick ending of the struggle and the complete success of the U.S. Army." He was also awarded a Silver Citation Star for "gallantry in action during the Philippine Insurrection." Sixteen years later, as further recognition of his meeting with Gen. García, he received Cuba's highest honor, the Order of Carlos Manuel de Céspedes.

In his essay, Hubbard wrote, "By the Eternal! there is a man whose form should be cast in deathless bronze and the statue placed in every college of the land. It is not book-learning young men need, nor instruction about this and that, but a stiffening of the vertebrae which will cause them to be loyal to a trust, to act promptly, concentrate their energies: do the thing—'Carry a message to Garcia!' " As it turned out, only one bronze image of Rowan exists in the United States; it is a bas relief showing Rowan meeting Gen. García, and is installed in the dining room of the Army and Navy Club in Washington, D.C. It is a duplicate of another bas relief included with an equestrian statue of García in Havana, Cuba. A bronze bust of Rowan was placed in Havana in the Parque de Maine and a plaque commemorating him was installed on the Acera de Louvre. Both these memorials have disappeared; however, another bronze plaque, still extant, is affixed to the building in Bayamo in which Rowan and García met.

In 1943 a World War II liberty ship was christened the SS Andrew Rowan, and over the years his name has been attached to other items: a bridge connecting Virginia and West Virginia over the New River; a West Virginia Dept. of Agr. farm; a retirement home in Sweet Springs, West Virginia; a Civilian Conservation Corps camp; and a road in Guantánamo Bay, Cuba.

== Writings ==
- "Battle-Fields of the Canadian North-West Territories", Journal of the Military Service Institution of the United States 8, no.31 (1887)
- How I Carried the Message to Garcia. San Francisco: William D. Harney, 1922
- "How I Got the Message to Garcia", Washington Post, April 28, 1929
- "My Mission and My Message to García", n.d., Hoover Institution Archives, ASR Papers, Box 6
- "My Ride Across Cuba", McClure's 11, no. 4 (1898)
- "Operations in Bocaue Mountains", October 1–3, 1899, Annual Reports of the War Department for the Fiscal Year Ended June 30, 1900, Part 5, Washington: 1900
- "Pacifism and Its Cure, – Universal Training". ASR Papers, Hoover Institute Archives, Box 6
- "Report to Adjutant General, Military Sub-District of Cebu". Feb 18, 1900
- The Island of Cuba (with M. M. Ramsey), (New York: Holt, 1896)

== Archival material ==
- Andrew Summers Rowan Papers, Hoover Institution Archives, Stanford University
- Josephine Morris Rowan Papers, 1894–49, California Historical Society, San Francisco
- National Archives and Records Administration, Washington, D.C., and College Park, Maryland
- West Virginia Archives Library, Charleston, West Virginia
