= Cuban National League =

Political party in Cuba

The Cuban National League (Spanish: Liga Nacional Cubana) was a political party in Cuba. The league was one of two political groupings (the other one being the Cuban National Party) that emerged from the Junta Patriótica in Havana in March 1899.

The league was formally founded at a meeting at the Club Antillano de La Habana towards the end of March 1899. The meeting was chaired by Fidel G. Pierra. Other founders of the league were Cosme de la Torriente, Carlos García Vélez, Emilio del Junco Pujadas, Esteban Borrero Echevarría, Miguel F. Viondi, Antonio Mesa Domínguez and Antonio Martín Rivero.

The objectives of the league were national independence, decentralization of power to the provinces and the establishment of a Democratic Republican Government.

In April 1899, the Cuban National League merged into the neighbourhood committees of the Cuban National Party. On April 10, a joint declaration of the Propaganda Commission of the Cuban National League and the Organizing Committee of the Cuban National Party formalized this merger.
