= María Luisa Dolz =

Cuban writer, essayist, educator and feminist activist

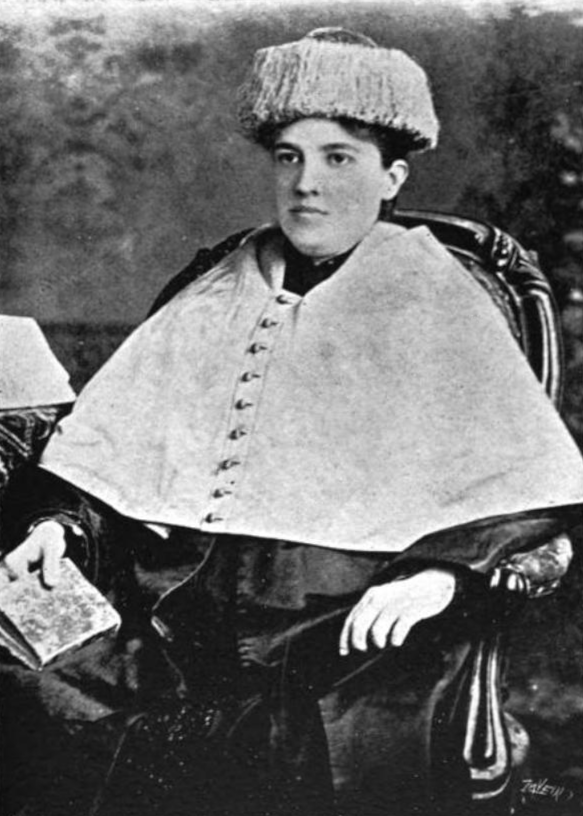
- Born: María Luisa Dolz y Arango; 4 October 1854; Havana, Captaincy General of Cuba
- Died: 27 May 1928 (aged 73); Marianao, Cuba
- Occupations: Writer, essayist, professor, feminist activist
- Writing career
- Language: Spanish
- Genre: Essay
- Notable works: Feminismo, injusticia de los Códigos (speech, 20 December 1894)
- Literary movement: Feminism

María Luisa Dolz y Arango (4 October 1854 – 27 May 1928) was a Cuban writer, essayist, educator, and feminist activist.

== Life and work ==
The daughter of Juan Norberto Dolz and María de la Luz Arango, María Luisa Dolz became an elementary school teacher in 1876 and a higher primary school teacher in 1877. She went on to earn a bachelor's degree in 1888, and graduated with a licentiate in Natural Sciences on 16 October 1890. In 1899 she completed her doctorate in the same specialty at the University of Havana, becoming the first woman to attain that degree in Cuba.

She was one of the first women to be included in secondary education at the Colegio Isabel la Católica, a level which would permit them access to a university. The school was later renamed Colegio María Luisa Dolz in her honor.

=== Activism ===
Together with Gertrudis Gómez de Avellaneda and Marta Abreu, she was one of the most prominent Cuban women of the late 19th and early 20th centuries, in both intellectual and social circles. She was a pioneer in the feminist field in her country, and undertook the defense of women's rights, specifically the right to education.
