= Jean-René Sigault =

French surgeon

Jean-René Sigault (born 1738) was a French surgeon.

Born in Dijon, he studied medicine at Angers and was interested in the obstetrics and operation of the pubic symphysis that Severin Pineau proposed in 1597. He defended his thesis on this subject in 1773 under the title An in partu contra natura sectio symphyseos ossium pubis sectione caesarea promptior et tutior.

Having settled in Paris, he made his first successful symphysiotomy in 1777. The Faculty of Medicine of Paris ordered his thesis printed and a medal was struck in his honor.
