= Autonomy Charter of Cuba =

The Autonomy Charter of Cuba (1897) was, along with the Autonomy Charter of Puerto Rico (1897), the first statute of autonomy granted by Spain to one of its overseas territories, specifically to the Captaincy General of Cuba. It authorized the formation of an autonomous government.

It was granted, under the liberal Práxedes Mateo Sagasta (1897–99) as Prime Minister, by royal decree signed on November 25, 1897, by Queen Regent Maria Christina of Austria on behalf of her son, Alfonso XIII. It was published in the Gaceta de Madrid on November 28 of that year, and in the Havana Gazette on December 19. Its main instigator and drafter was the liberal politician Segismundo Moret.

Its promulgation was accompanied by the establishment of universal male suffrage in all overseas provinces.

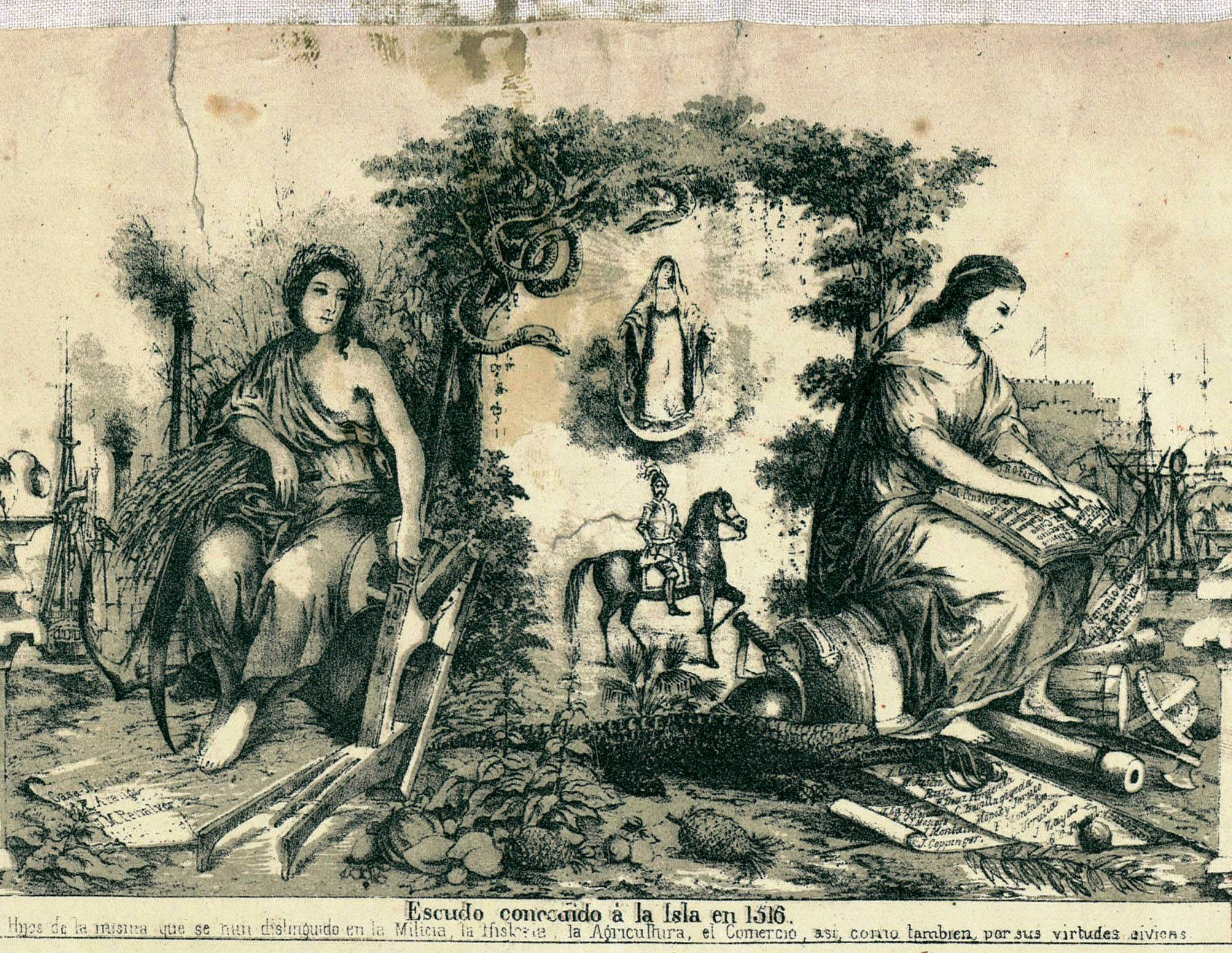
Coat of arms of the Primate of Cuba, granted by Cardinal Cisneros in 1516.

== Contents of the Autonomous Charter ==
The Charter consisted of 70 articles divided into 9 titles, plus 4 additional articles and 2 transitional articles.

An Insular Parliament was established, divided into a Chamber of Representatives (65 members elected every five years; one for every 25,000 inhabitants) and a Board of Directors (18 elected in half every five years and 17 appointed for life). The Parliament was responsible for regulating its revenue and expenditure budgets and all local affairs of the island, as well as for matters of Grace and Justice, Government, Finance, and Development.

Meanwhile, the Cortes and the Spanish executive reserved those relating to the State, Navy, and War. Its representative would be a governor-general, elected by the king upon the nomination of the Cortes, who would exercise Supreme Authority on behalf of the Metropolis. The power to legislate would rest with the insular chambers and the governor-general. The island government, or Office, would be presided over by a secretary appointed by the governor and composed of five secretariats, responsible to Parliament: those of Grace and Justice; Finance; Public Instruction; Public Works and Communications; and Agriculture, Industry, and Commerce.

Furthermore, Cuba's provincial councils (Pinar del Río, Havana, Matanzas, Santa Clara, Puerto Príncipe, and Santiago de Cuba) and municipalities would be maintained, and the island would continue to elect 30 deputies and 16 senators to the Spanish Parliament.

The charters of Cuba and Puerto Rico were the most advanced self-government documents, surpassing the demands of the Autonomist Party and fully comparable to the Dominion status granted by the United Kingdom to Canada in 1867.

== Development and end of self-government ==
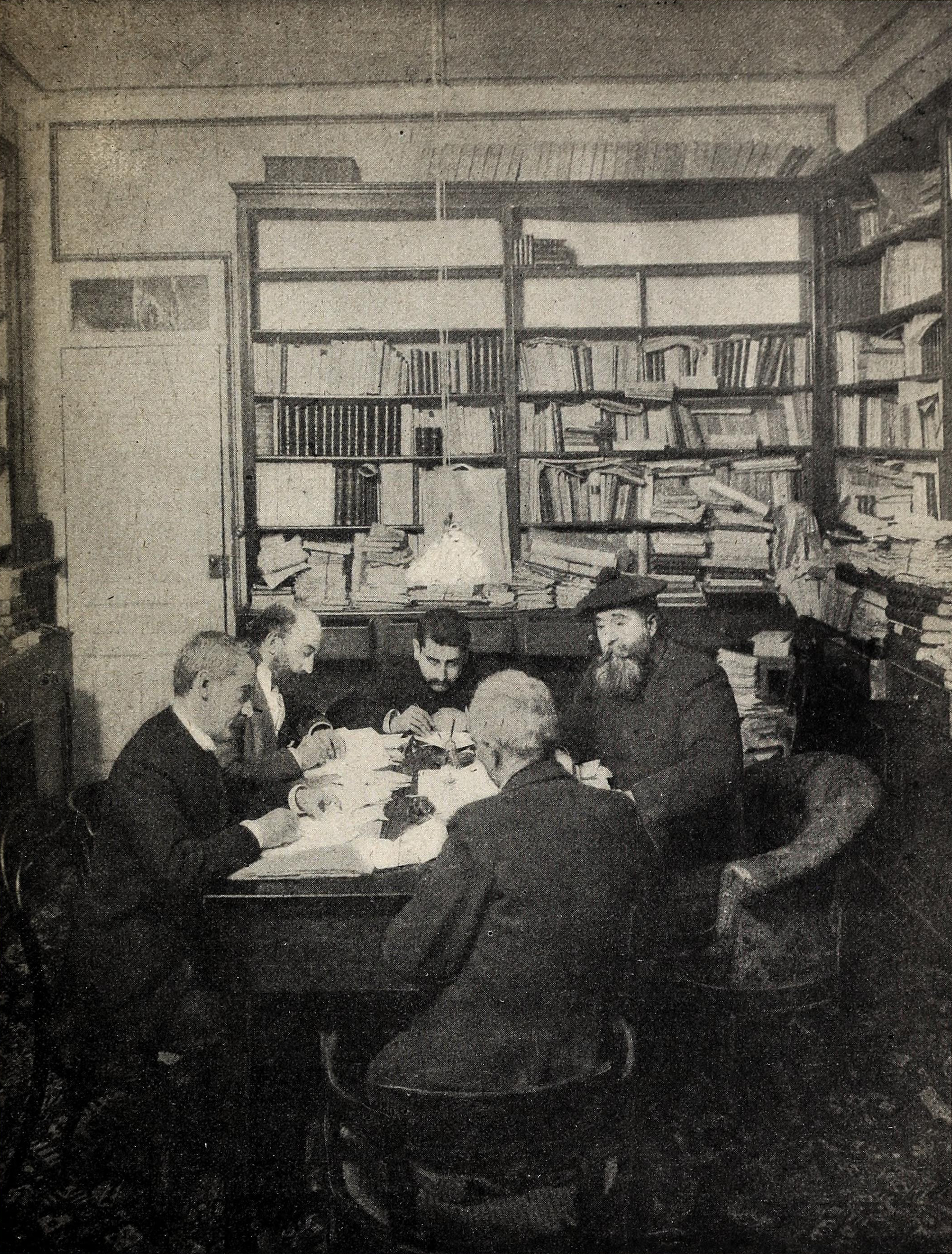
Segismundo Moret at home dictating the Autonomous Constitution to the stenographers (November 1897)

The autonomous system came into effect on January 1, 1898, when the new island government was sworn in before Governor Ramón Blanco. José María Gálvez Alonso, leader of the Cuban autonomists, was president; lawyer Antonio Govín was in charge of Grace and Justice; the Marquis of Montoro, Rafael Montoro, was in charge of Finance; Dr. Patricio Zayas was in charge of Public Education; Dr. Eduardo Dolz was in charge of Public Works and Communications; and businessman Laureano Rodríguez was in charge of Agriculture, Commerce, and Industry.

Cuban autonomy sparked a broad debate in the Spanish press, being celebrated by pro-government liberals and accepted by conservatives if it helped end the violence on the island. On the island, it was received with hostility by both the pro-independence camps and the more hardline, who yearned for the government of Valeriano Weyler, whose uproar was manipulated by the American tabloid press to disparage the new autonomous regime.

Two months after the sinking of the USS Maine on February 15, elections to form the Island Parliament were held between April 24 and 28, 1898, and were won by the moderate autonomist movement with 80% of the vote and a 48% turnout.

However, the Spanish-American War prevented the full development of self-government. On August 3, the island chambers were suspended and finally dissolved on October 28. By the Treaty of Paris of December 10, 1898, Spain renounced its sovereignty over Cuba. The island came under occupation by the United States until 1902, when Cuba was finally granted independence.
