= Circular Campaign =

Part of the Cuban War of Independence in 1895

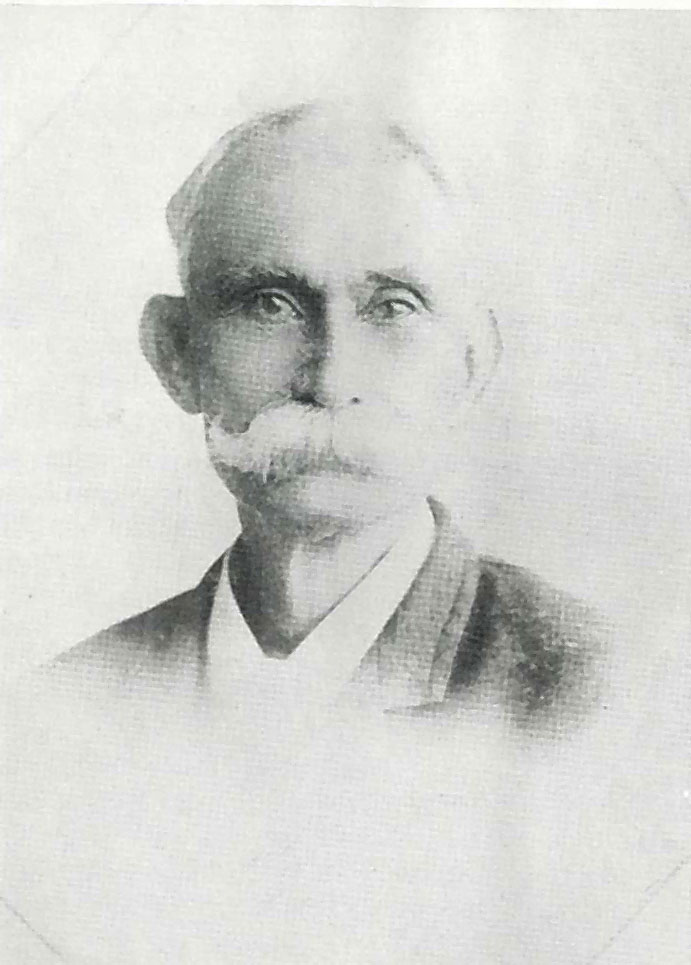
Máximo Gómez, 1894

The Circular Campaign (Spanish: la campaña circular) was a guerilla campaign carried out by general Máximo Gómez in the area of Puerto del Príncipe (now Camagüey Province), Cuba, during the Cuban War of Independence, in May–August 1895. It was named so because the strategy of Gómez was to constantly circle around the province in hit-and-run attacks.

Gómez started his operations at about the same time as the First Eastern Campaign of Antonio Maceo, with only 25 men, but on June 5 about 200 men from Las Tunas joined him. His largest success was burning Altagracia, which was left undefended. Later he took over small garrisons of El Mulato (June 18) and San Gerónimo (June 25).

The successes of both Circular and First Eastern campaigns allowed the rebels to amass several thousand men mid-1895. However, their major problem was lack of materiel, while they could requisition enough horses.
