= Carlos García Vélez =

Cuban general (1867-1963)

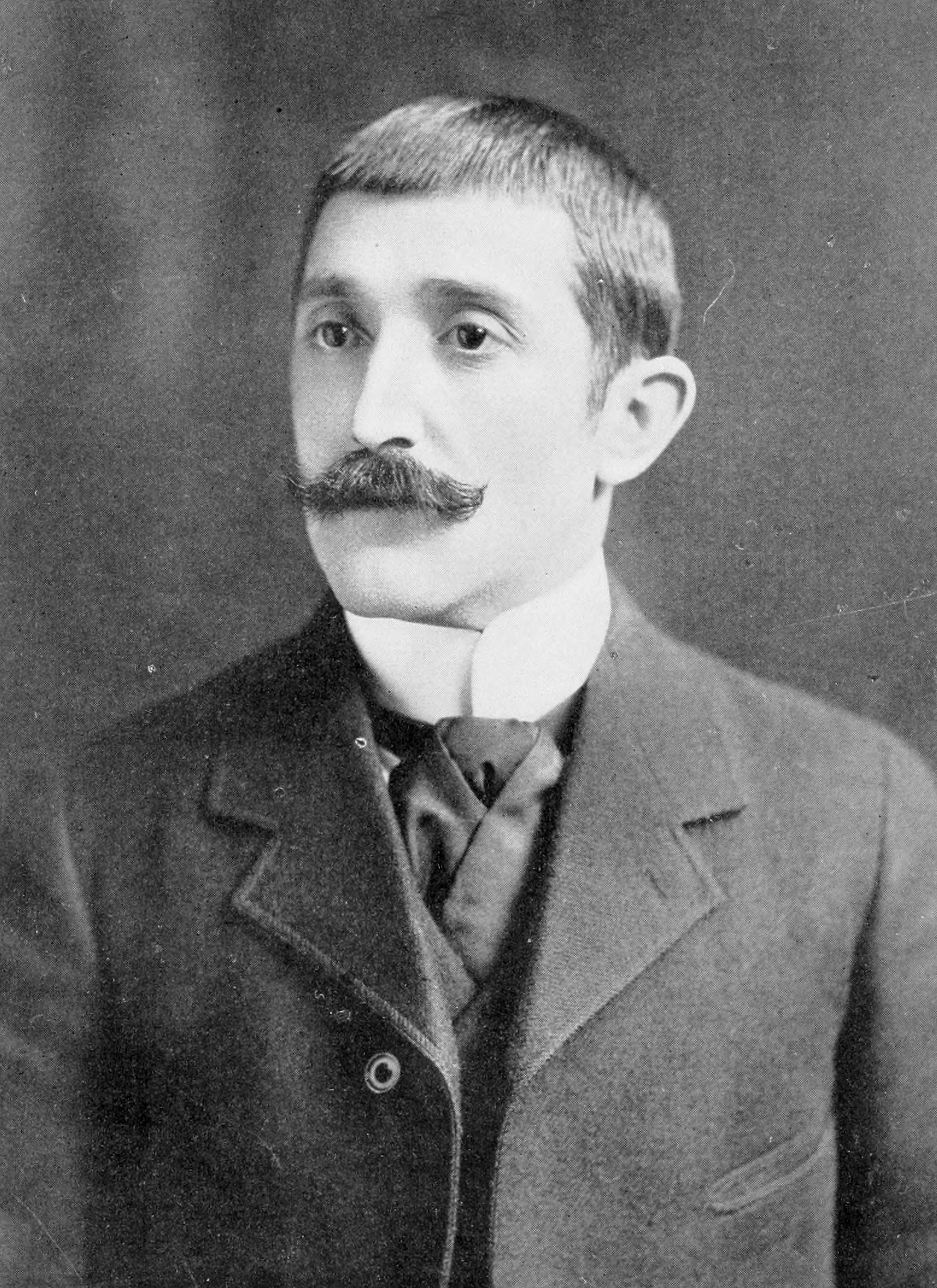
- Born: Carlos García y Vélez; April 29, 1867; Santa Rita, Jiguaní, Oriente Province, Captaincy General of Cuba, Spanish Empire
- Died: November 6, 1963 (aged 95); Havana, Cuba
- Relatives: Calixto García (father)
- Military career
- Allegiance: Cuba
- Branch: Cuban Liberation Army
- Rank: Brigadier general
- Conflicts: War of 1895; Spanish–American War

Carlos García y Vélez (April 29, 1867 - November 6, 1963) was a Cuban dental surgeon and army general during the Cuban War of Independence and Spanish–American War.

== Biography ==
=== Early history ===
Carlos García y Vélez was born in Santa Rita, Jiguaní, Oriente Province (now Granma Province), Spanish Cuba on April 29, 1867. He was the son of Cuban General Calixto García and Isabel Vélez Cabrera. In his early years, he migrated to the United States.

He studied dentistry in the United States and graduated from Penn Dental. By 1893, he worked as a dental surgeon in Madrid, Spain, and was noted in a medical paper for his use of anesthetic. García Vélez was the director of The Madrid Stomatological Journal (Spanish: La Revista Estomatológica de Madrid) in 1894. In 1895, he served as the recording secretary of the Spanish Society of Dentistry (Spanish: Sociedad Odontologica Española) formed in Madrid, to enact reform in dental education.

=== Cuban War of Independence ===
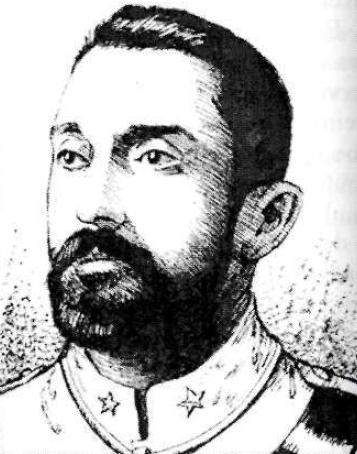
Carlos García Vélez

During the War of 1895 and Spanish-American War in 1898, he was colonel in the ranks of the Cuban Liberation Army. He was later promoted to Brigadier general.

In 1898, his father Maj. Gen. Calixto García died in Washington, D.C.

=== U.S. occupation of Cuba ===
He was among the founding members of the Cuban National League in March 1899.

On January 18, 1900, Military Governor of Cuba Leonard Wood created the office of General Inspector of Prisons of Cuba, appointing García Vélez. He held the position of Inspector General of Prisons until 1902, working to clear the prison abuses that characterized Cuban prisons.

During the Second Occupation of Cuba in 1906, liberal military and political leaders including García Vélez opposed the Cuban Rural Guard and advocated the creation of a regular military force as its replacement.

=== Minister Plenipotentiary ===
During the José Miguel Gómez administration, Gen. Carlos García Vélez was named the Envoy Extraordinary and Minister Plenipotentiary of the Republic of Cuba in the United States. He attended the 1909 Wright Brothers Homecoming Celebration medals ceremony held on June 18, 1909, at the Montgomery County Fairgrounds in Dayton, Ohio.

As a delegate of Cuba, he travelled to Buenos Aires for the 4th Pan-American Conference. The delegates were duly authorized to approve the recommendations, resolutions, conventions, and treaties which they might deem advantageous to the interests of the American republics. Standing committees were appointed and García Vélez was assigned president of the first committee with the topic of 'Rules and Credentials'. He also participated in the fourth committee which included one member for each delegation. On August 11, 1910, he attended the Pan-American Copyright Convention for the Republic of Cuba. He attended the Pan-American Trademark Convention of 1910 on August 20.

As plenipotentiary, he represented Cuba at Christiania, Paris, Chile, and Madrid. In 1913, he retained his place as a Cuban diplomat under the new administration of Mario García Menocal.

In 1914, the Cuban Minister to the England who had been in Cuba on leave of absence, arrived in New York. Germans held the Cuban envoy's son in prison in October 1914. The Cuban Government withdrew its consuls from Germany and ordered its legation in Berlin closed.

At the 5th International Conference of American States held at Santiago, Chile, March 25 to May 3, 1923, he served on the first committee known as the Political Committee with Manuel Márquez Sterling as delegates of Cuba. He was the dean of the Cuban diplomatic corps and Cuban Minister to Great Britain in 1923.

=== Veterans' and Patriots' Movement ===
García Vélez was also the president of the Supreme Council of the Veterans' and Patriots' Association. From 1923 to 1924, he led the movement in opposition to the Alfredo Zayas y Alfonso administration's nonpayment of military retirement benefits. In August 1923, at the Martí Theater in Havana, veterans led by García Vélez met to draft a list of demands for President Zayas. He threatened violence if Congress passed specific railroad and port legislation, leading to the movement losing the support of El Heraldo de Cuba. The Cuban junta, dedicated to overthrowing the current Zayas Administration, was covertly active in New York, where García Vélez arrived on March 20, 1924. By the summer of 1924, the majority of leaders were either imprisoned or in exile, with some accepting Zayas' offer of amnesty.

== Death ==
Carlos García y Vélez died on November 6, 1963, in Havana, Cuba.
