= Calixto García =

Cuban general (1839–1898)

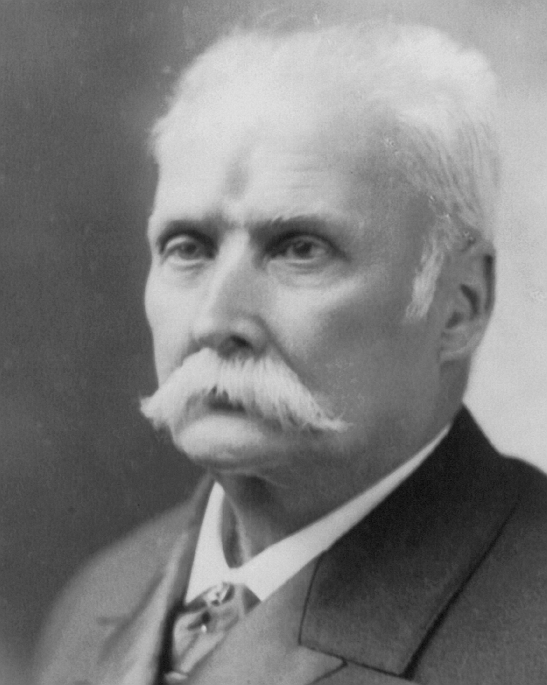
- Garcia in 1898
- Born: Calixto García y Iñíguez; August 4, 1839; Holguín, Cuba, Spain
- Died: 11 December 1898 (aged 59); Washington, D.C., U.S.
- Military career
- Allegiance: Cuba
- Branch: Cuban Liberation Army
- Rank: General
- Conflicts: Ten Years' War; Little War; Cuban War of Independence

Calixto García y Íñiguez (August 4, 1839 – December 11, 1898) was a Cuban general in three Cuban uprisings, part of the Cuban War for Independence: the Ten Years' War, the Little War, and the War of 1895, itself sometimes called the Cuban War for Independence, which initiated the Spanish–American War, ultimately resulting in national independence for Cuba.

== Ancestry and progeny ==
García was born in Holguín to parents of Cuban Criollo descent. He was a large, strong, educated man with a short temper. García was the grandson of Calixto García de Luna e Izquierdo, who had fought as a royalist in the Battle of Carabobo in 1821 during the Venezuelan War of Independence. His grandmother was Maria de los Angeles Gonzalez, said to be the daughter of a cacique from Valencia, Venezuela. His grandfather (who had dropped the aristocratic "de Luna" upon taking refuge in Cuba) had been jailed on March 18, 1837, for demanding emancipation of slaves, constitutional freedom for all, and allegedly trying to hang a priest who opposed him. As befitted a man of importance of that time, Calixto had a wife, Isabel Velez Cabrera, and a good number of mistresses; these women gave birth to many children both legitimate (about 7) and illegitimate (at least six, each to a different woman). A number of his sons, most notably Carlos García Vélez and Calixto Enamorado, fought in his armies.

== War record ==
Around the age of 28, García joined with a Cuban uprising which became the first war of independence (Ten Years' War). García fought against Spanish colonial rule for five years until his capture. Far from most of his troops, protected only by a small group who soon lay dead or dying around him, Garcia, in an attempt to avoid giving the Spanish the satisfaction of seizing him, shot himself under the chin with a .45 caliber pistol. Although the bullet went out of his forehead and knocked him unconscious, he survived; the wound left a great scar and gave him headaches for the rest of his life.

He was imprisoned until the Pact of Zanjón ending the Ten Years' War was signed in 1878. García travelled to Paris and New York between imprisonments. In keeping to his quest, García joined with Antonio Maceo Grajales in the Little War from 1879 to 1880 as well as the 1895 War for Independence. He, and at least three sons, separately escaped from Spain and arrived with a well-supplied expedition in 1896. In that last conflict he succeeded Maceo, once his subordinate in the Ten Years' War, as the second in command in the Cuban Army.

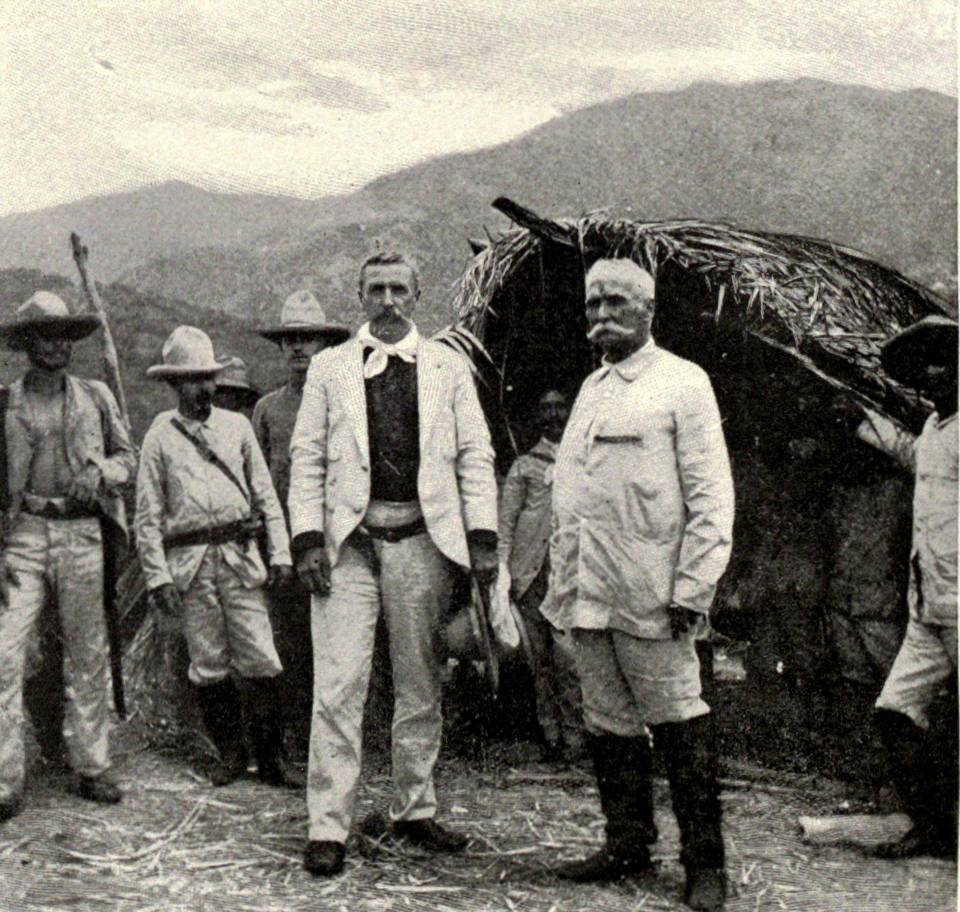
García with American brigadier general William Ludlow at the time of the landing of the American army in Cuba

Garcia had a long string of victories in this war, which included the taking of Tunas and Guisa, and the emotionally significant re-occupation of Bayamo. García made liberal use of spies to prepare for his attacks. These included Dominador de la Guardia father of Ángel de la Guardia and María Machado, illegitimate daughter of Spanish General Emilio March who helped prepare the taking of Tunas; Frederick Funston later US Major General and José Martí y Zayas Bazán son of José Martí the major Cuban National Hero directed artillery; Mario García Menocal a to-be president of Cuba who was wounded in a principal assault. Angel de la Guardia, also a major Cuban national hero, died in this battle on August 30, 1897.

At the time of the U.S. landings, García, with skilled use of mobile artillery, controlled the interior of old Oriente Province, and prepared the landing places for the U.S. Army near Santiago. His troops effectively supported the Marine forces at Guantanamo who, once out of range of the guns of the USS Marblehead, had difficulty dealing with Spanish guerrilla tactics. He was the general who dealt with the American troops and joined them in military actions, only to be denied entrance into Santiago de Cuba when the Spanish surrendered.

== Death ==
García died of pneumonia at the age of 59 on December 11, 1898, one day after the end of the Spanish–American War, while on a diplomatic mission in Washington, D.C. He was buried temporarily in Arlington National Cemetery in the U.S., then transported on the heavily armed seagoing warship USS Nashville to Cuba. His final burial in Havana, Cuba, was preceded by a number of emotional incidents, and his statues and busts are found throughout Cuba. A major statue is found on the Malecón near the US Interests Section in Havana. After his death, a large bronze tablet prominently inscribed with the phrase "Dulce et decorum est pro patria mori" was erected by the Freemasons at the place of his demise—the Raleigh Hotel in Washington, D.C. Today, this tablet resides at the private residence of one of García's direct descendants.

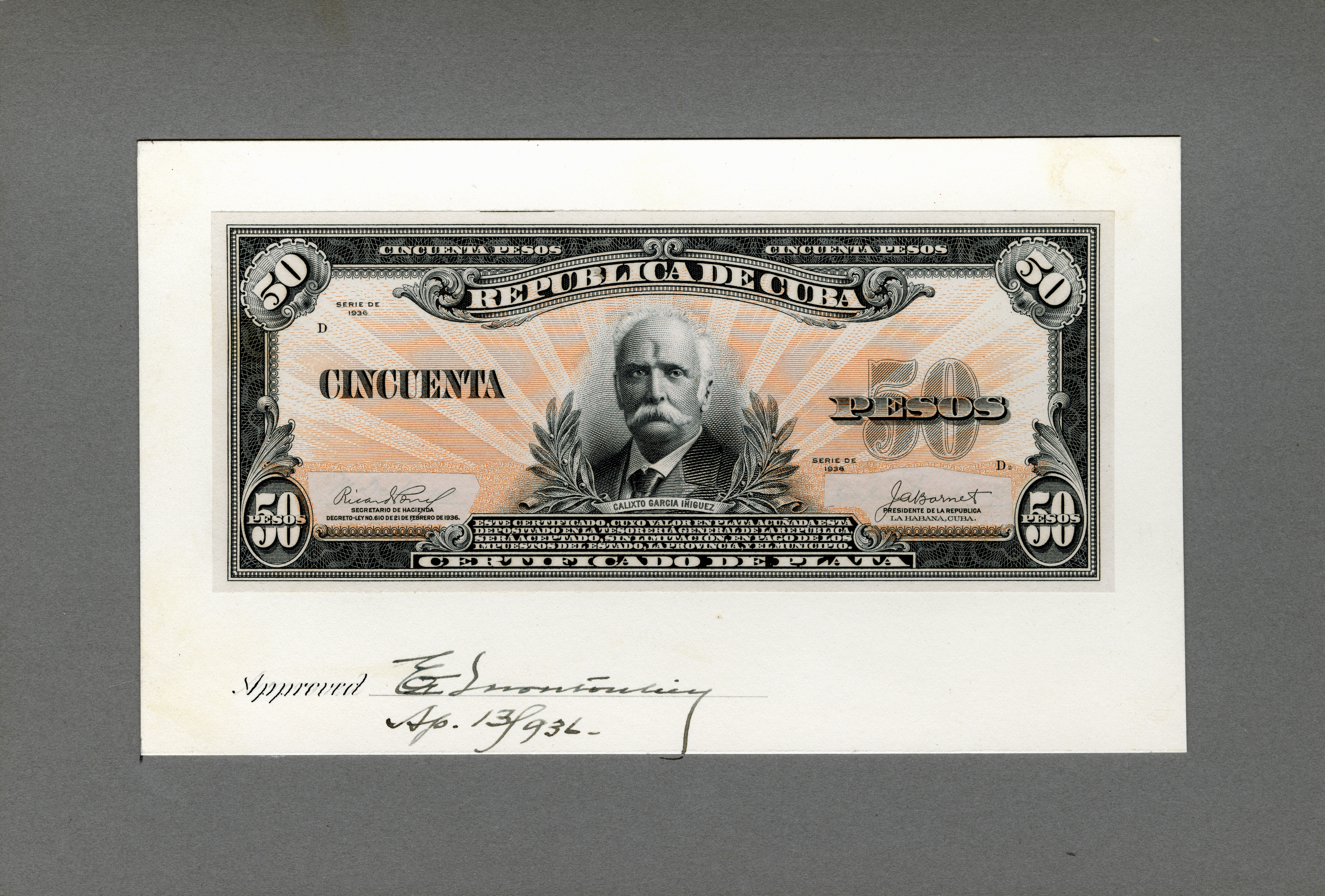
García depicted on the original artist/progress proof designed by the United States Bureau of Engraving and Printing for Cuban silver certificates (1936).

The essay "A Message to Garcia" by Elbert Hubbard was written in reference by U.S. intelligence officer Andrew Summers Rowan to establish contact with García early in the Spanish–American War. It was historically-inaccurate; Rowan had been instructed to join Garcia but actually returned promptly to the United States to find that the essay had already made him a popular hero. According to language expert Charles Earle Funk, "to take a message to García", meaning to accept an extremely difficult challenge, was a popular U.S. slang expression for years. The essay was made into two American films, the 1916 silent A Message to Garcia with García played by Charles Sutton and the 1936 film A Message to Garcia featuring Enrique Acosta.

In 1976, a municipality in Holguín Province was named Calixto García after him. His portrait is on the 50 Cuban peso banknote.

== Print sources ==
- Castellano García, Gerardo 1927. Tierras y Glorias de Oriente (Calixto García Iñiguez) Editorial Hermes Havana
- Escalante Beaton, Anibal 1946. Calixto García Su Campaña en el 95. Arrow Press Havana. (Introduction by General Carlos García Velez, son of the mayor general and a firsthand witness to many of the events described.)
- Rice, Donald Tunnicliff, 2016. Cast in Deathless Bronze: Andrew Rowan, The Spanish–American War, and the Origins of American Empire. Morgantown: West Virginia University Press. (This volume contains more information regarding García's life and career than any other English-language publication.)
