= Advisory Law Commission of Cuba =

Cuban law commission (1906–1909)

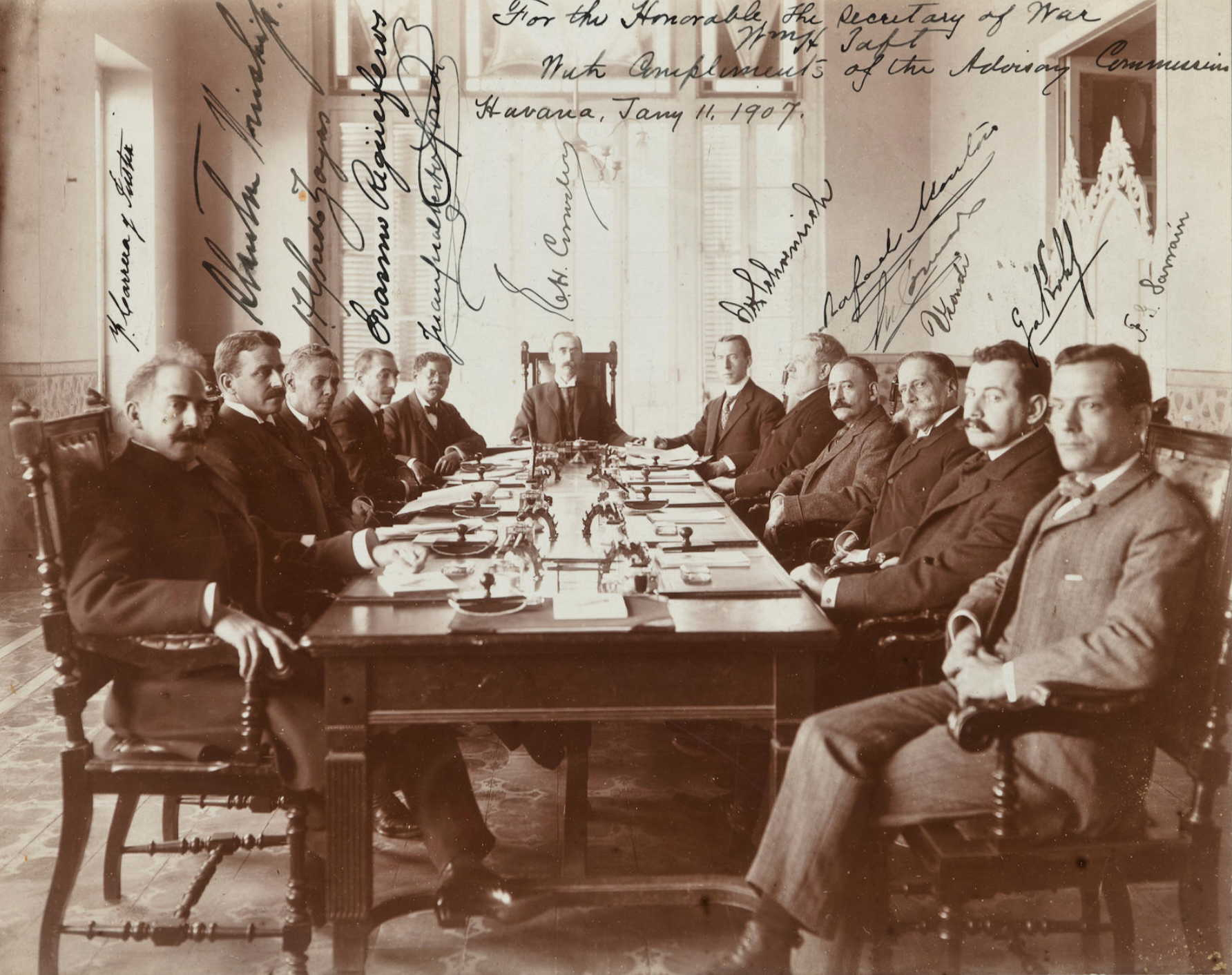
The Advisory Law Commission of Cuba, Havana, January 11, 1907. Enoch Crowder is seated at the head of the table.

The Advisory Law Commission of Cuba (Spanish: Comisión Consultiva), established on December 24, 1906, was a temporary law commission under the Provisional Government of Cuba. The commission was created by Provisional Governor William Howard Taft, but largely presided over by his successor, Provisional Governor Charles Edward Magoon. Its primary objective was to draft and revise laws to modernize Cuba's legal framework, which was then based on outdated Spanish legislation from 1877 that centralized control at the national level.

The Advisory Law Commission played a crucial role in structuring nearly every part of the Cuban government. Its contributions were, in the words of the Bulletin of the International Bureau of the American Republics; "as important and far-reaching as was the drafting of the Constitution itself," as they were necessary to implement the Constitution effectively.

One of the Commission's significant contributions was the drafting of a new municipal law, adopted on January 24, 1908. This law aimed to decentralize administrative powers, granting greater autonomy to municipal governments and reducing the centralization that had characterized the previous legal framework. The efforts of the Advisory Law Commission were instrumental in transitioning Cuba's legal system from its colonial past to a more modern structure, laying the groundwork for future legal and administrative reforms in the Republic of Cuba.

The commission also developed an electoral code that introduced universal male suffrage, while at the same time limiting eligibility for public office to literate Cuban citizens. Additionally, it played a role in judicial reform by creating a legal framework that ensured the judiciary branch's independence, breaking away from the colonial-era system where the courts had been under the control of the executive branch.

== Members ==
Membership of the commission was composed of 12 members overall, with three representatives from the United States, and nine Cuban lawyers, from different political backgrounds. When the Advisory Council of eleven members was established, with General Enoch H. Crowder as chairman, it was predominantly composed of Liberals. Only two "Conservatives" were included, along with one member whose political affiliations were uncertain.

Three individuals—García Kohly, Viondi, and Carrera—were not part of the August revolutionists but were originally members of the Moderado party, which had supported former President Tomás Estrada Palma. Although they initially participated in the Commission as Independents, closely aligned with the Liberals, they later fully joined the Liberal party. The Council held significant influence over government appointments, ensuring that the administration during the Second U.S. Intervention was largely staffed by Liberal officials. This led to the dismissal of experienced personnel from Estrada Palma’s administration in favor of less qualified individuals who were selected primarily for their political allegiance.

Cuban voters, generally responsive to shifts in political power, took notice of the sudden prominence of the Liberal party. Previously lacking significant political and social influence, Liberal leaders began to gain recognition, seemingly with the approval of the United States or the commission overseeing Cuba from Washington. This perception contributed to the Liberals' electoral success, as many voters interpreted U.S. actions as indirect support for the party. The belief that the United States favored and would continue to back the Liberals played a crucial role in their political rise.

One example frequently cited to illustrate the unintended consequences of U.S. intervention was an order—reportedly issued by mistake—which stated that individuals who admitted to stealing a horse would be granted full ownership of the stolen animal and would not be required to return it. This order, which remained in Cuban legal records, became symbolic of the inconsistencies and perceived missteps of the intervention. While it did not reflect the overall policy of the U.S. administration, it was seen by many Cuban citizens as indicative of the flawed execution of governance during that period, leading to disillusionment among those who had initially placed great trust in American oversight.

=== United States representatives ===
- Colonel Enoch Crowder, President of the Commission
- Major Blanton C. Winship, Judge-Advocate
- Otto Schoenrich, Judge

=== Cuban representatives ===
==== Liberal Party – Zayista Campaign ====
- Juan Gualberto Gomez, Secretary of the Commission, was a well-known Black Afrocuban political leader and editor of El Liberal, a publication associated with the "Zayista movement."
- Erasmo Regüeiferos, Speaker of the Commission, a lawyer from Santiago de Cuba
- Alfredo Zayas y Alfonso, Cuban senator, also the presidential candidate
- Felipe González Sarrain, former member of the Havana City Council and Congressman

==== Liberal Party – Miguelista Campaign ====
- Miguel F. Viondi, former mayor of Guanabacoa and personal friend of José Martí

==== Conservative Party ====
- Manuel María Coronado, a conservative leader, owned and edited the newspaper La Discusión
- Mario García Kohly, a conservative and a member of the House of Representatives
- Rafael Montoro, a distinguished conservative statesman who had previously served as a diplomat to both England and Germany

==== Independent ====
- Francisco Carrera Justiz, author and professor of municipal government at the National University of Havana

== Archives ==
- Commission meeting minutes archives
- "Browse authors with titles: cuba capitania general boletin oficial ano i iii (1862 1864)". The Online Books Page.
