= Mario García =

Mario García may refer to:

- Mario García (athlete), Spanish runner
- Mario García Cames (1883–1951), Uruguayan diplomat and aviation pioneer
- Mario García (designer) (born 1947), American newspaper and magazine designer
- Mario García (footballer, born 1967), Mexican football manager and former midfielder
- Mario García (footballer, born 1980), Mexican football manager and former defender
- Mario García (footballer, born 1999), Spanish football left-back
- Mario García (footballer, born 2003), Spanish football left-back
- Mario García Incháustegui (c. 1924–1977), Cuban diplomat
- Mario García (judge), US magistrate judge
- Mario García Kohly (1875–1935), Cuban journalist, author and politician
- Mario García Menocal (1866–1941), president of Cuba, 1913–1921
- Mario García Palmieri (1927-2014), Puerto Rican politician and cardiologist
- Mario García Torres, Mexican conceptual artist
- Mario García Valdez, Mexican academic, president of the Autonomous University of San Luis Potosí
- Mario José García (born 1983), Spanish water polo player
