= Erasmo Regüeiferos =

Cuban politician

Erasmo Regüeiferos y Boudet
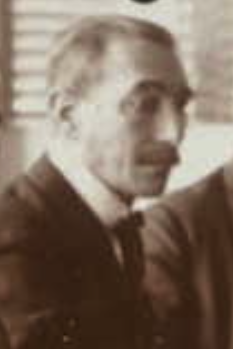

Secretary of Justice, Attorney General, and Director of Cuban Justice Department for the Republic of Cuba
- In office June 16, 1921 – 1925
- President: Alfredo Zayas y Alfonso

Speaker of the Cuban Advisory Law Commission for the Provisional Government of Cuba
- In office December 24, 1906 – January 1909 Serving with Alfredo Zayas y Alfonso
- Provisional Governors: William Howard Taft; Charles Edward Magoon
- Commission President: Enoch Crowder

Personal details
- Born: 1863 Santiago de Cuba
- Died: June 19, 1936 (aged 72–73)

Erasmo Regüeiferos y Boudet was a Cuban lawyer, politician, Speaker of the Cuban Advisory Law Commission (Spanish: Comisión Consultiva) under Colonel Enoch H. Crowder for the Provisional Government of Cuba, and the Secretary of Justice for Cuban President Alfredo Zayas, acting as the Attorney General and Director for the Cuban Department of Justice in the early 1920's.

== Career ==
Prior to his entry into the Provisional Government, he was a successful lawyer in his hometown of Santiago de Cuba, and was a playwright who wrote at least one play.

In 1923, he was implicated in the perceived corrupt sale of the Santa Clara convent, and was the subject of anti-government discourse by a group of young intellectuals led by Rubén Martínez Villena during the events of the Protest of the Thirteen, which interrupted the first public ceremony in which he had ever taken part.
