= Felipe González (disambiguation) =

Felipe González (born 1942) is a Spanish politician.

Felipe González may also refer to:

- Felipe González de Ahedo (1702–1792), Spanish navigator and cartographer
- Felipe González de Canales, Spanish agronomist and educator
- Felipe González González (1947–2023), Mexican politician and entrepreneur, governor of Aguascalientes
- Felipe González González (bishop) (born 1944), Spanish Roman Catholic prelate, ordinary of the Apostolic Vicariate of Caroní
- Felipe González Morales, Chilean international lawyer, United Nations special rapporteur for migrants
- Felipe González Ruiz (born 1958), Mexican politician, former federal deputy
- Felipe González Sarrain (1868–1950), Cuban lawyer and politician
