= Miguel F. Viondi =

Cuban lawyer and politician (1846-1919)

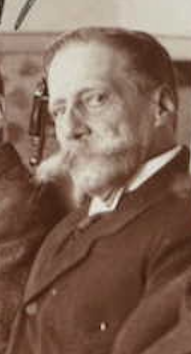

Member of the Advisory Law Commission of Cuba
- In office 1906–1909

Mayor of Guanabacoa
- In office ?

Representative in the Chamber of Representatives of the Republic in Arms
- In office ?

City Councilor of Guanabacoa
- In office ?

Personal details
- Born: October 7, 1846
- Died: November 14, 1919 (aged 73) Guanabacoa

Miguel Francisco Viondi y Vera was a prominent Cuban lawyer and political figure active in the late 19th and early 20th centuries. He played a significant role in Cuba's legal and political landscape during the island's transition from Spanish colonial rule to independence.

== Life ==
When José Martí moved back to Cuba after his first period of exile in Spain, Viondi formed a close friendship with him, along with Nicolás Azcárate y Escobedo, and Juan Gualberto Gómez. The four men became drinking buddies at the "Liceo de Guanabacoa."

Viondi served as vice president of the Literary and Artistic Lyceum of Guanabacoa while José Martí held the position of secretary. During the republican era, he held various public offices, including councilor, mayor of Guanabacoa, and representative in the Chamber. Observing the frequent meetings between Martí and Juan Gualberto Gómez in his law office, Viondi recognized their revolutionary activities and offered them a small room to use for their discussions. Officially, Martí and Gualberto became lawyers for Viondi's firm.

In August 1879, the Little War began.

On September 17, 1879, Spanish colonial authorities arrested José Martí in Havana for the second time. At that moment, Juan Gualberto Gómez was dining at his home but quickly left to alert Azcárate, who successfully lifted Martí's incommunicado status. Meanwhile, Viondi worked to dispose of newspapers and documents that could have implicated them in revolutionary activities.

Martí deeply valued his friendship with Viondi, referring to him as an "exemplary friend" in a letter dated October 13, 1879, written after his second deportation to Spain. He expressed his gratitude by recalling, "I will never forget those days in the lively law firm, nor the wounds you healed for me, nor the strength you restored in me." In several other letters, Martí continued to express his admiration and appreciation for Viondi. Martí also told Viondi that he was suffering from sadness and loneliness in exile, and that he longed for the freedom of Cuba and himself. Soon after this, Martí escaped to France, and then to the United States, where he remained for the next fourteen years.

Just five days after arriving in New York, Martí wrote another letter to Viondi, requesting his assistance in arranging for Martí's wife and son to join him in the city as soon as possible. Initially, he had intended to wait until April to make this request, hoping to establish himself and secure financial stability before bringing his family. However, within days of being in New York, he became certain that the city offered promising opportunities and declared, “It is here... that I will live.”

In 1895, Viondi served as the defense attorney for Julio Sanguily, a Cuban revolutionary accused of conspiracy against the Spanish colonial government. His eloquent defense highlighted the lack of substantial evidence and procedural irregularities in the trial.

In 1899, Viondi was among the founders of the Cuban National League (Liga Nacional Cubana), an organization that sought national independence, decentralization of power to the provinces, and the establishment of a democratic republican government. The league later merged with the Cuban National Party, reflecting the dynamic political environment of the time.

From 1906 to 1909, Viondi was appointed to the Advisory Law Commission of Cuba (Comisión Consultiva) under the Provisional Government of Cuba. This commission was responsible for drafting and revising laws to modernize Cuba's legal framework, transitioning from outdated Spanish legislation to a more autonomous system.

== Viondi Park ==
There is a public park in Guanabacoa, Cuba called "Viondi Park," where a bust made out of Carrara marble stands in his honor. (Coordinates: 23.124541942798167°N 82.306467246783°W) Viondi's house is next to the park, but the park and the house have been eroding due to a lack of public funds to maintain them. The Museum of Guanabacoa has been trying to maintain local history, but the Cuban economy have forced local citizens to re-use materials from abandoned properties like Viondi's house - ceiling tiles, flooring, and precious metals. Almost every surface of the home have been vandalized. To protect the marble bust from further erosion, a representative of the local government covered the whole statue in white paint, but this has covered up the plaque.
