= Alfredo Zayas y Alfonso =

Cuban lawyer, poet and politician

Alfredo Zayas
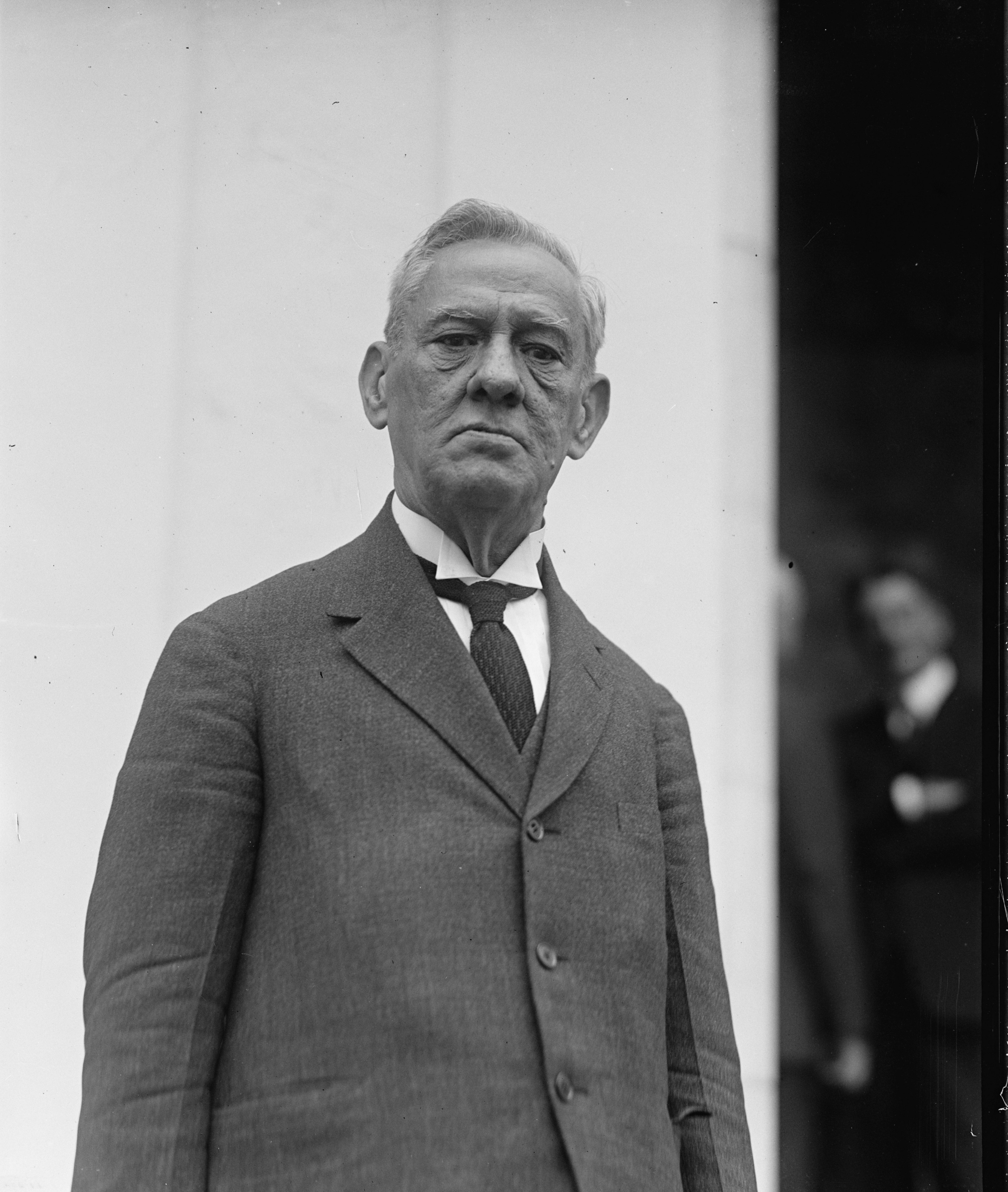
- Zayas in 1925

4th President of Cuba
- In office 20 May 1921 – 20 May 1925
- Vice President: Francisco Carrillo
- Preceded by: Mario García Menocal
- Succeeded by: Gerardo Machado

3rd Vice President of Cuba
- In office January 1909 – May 1913
- President: José Miguel Gómez
- Preceded by: Enrique José Varona
- Succeeded by: Domingo Méndez Capote

Personal details
- Born: February 21, 1861 Havana, Spanish Cuba
- Died: April 11, 1934 (aged 73) Havana, Cuba
- Party: Liberal Party
- Other political affiliations: National League
- Spouse(s): 1st Margarita María Teresa Claudia del Carmen Arrieta y Diago, 2nd 1914 María Asunción de las Mercedes Jaén y Planas
- Children: Margarita Zayas y Arrieta; Alfredo Zayas y Arrieta; Francisco Zayas y Arrieta; Maria-Teresa Zayas y Arrieta; Alfredo Zayas y Mendez
- Occupation: Attorney, politician

Military service
- Battles/wars: Chambelona War

Alfredo de Zayas y Alfonso (February 21, 1861 – April 11, 1934), usually known as Alfredo de Zayas under Spanish naming customs and also known as Alfredo Zayas, was a Cuban lawyer, poet and political figure who was President of Cuba.

He served as prosecutor, judge, mayor of Havana, secretary of the Constitutional Convention, senator in 1905, president of the Senate in 1906, Vice President of Cuba from 1909 to 1913 and President of Cuba from May 20, 1921, to May 20, 1925.

== Background ==
Born in Havana into an aristocratic family with old sugar plantations, he was the 5th child of Dr. José María de Zayas y Jiménez (1824–1887), a noted lawyer and educator, and Lutgarda Alfonso y Espada (1831–1898). He was brother to Dr. Juan Bruno de Zayas y Alfonso (1867–1896), a medical doctor and revolutionary hero who died in the war for Cuba's independence, and of Dr. Francisco de Zayas y Alfonso (1857–1924), Cuba's long-time Minister to Paris and Brussels. He also had an illegitimate brother, whose name was lost. As one of the leaders of the Cuban Insurrection of 1895, he ceased using the noble-sounding "de" in his name and became known simply as Alfredo Zayas. Besides his successful legal practice, he was active in Cuban literary circles and was co-editor of the journal "Cuba Literaria".

== During the last Cuban war for independence ==
Zayas was an intellectual, not a military leader, and during the 1895-1898 Cuban War of Independence, he was arrested and sent to prison in the African possession of Ceuta. When deported (September 20. 1896), while in transit to Spain's Cárcel Modelo of Madrid, he wrote some of his best poetry, like "Al Caer la Nieve," subsequently published in his Obras Completas, Vol. 1, Poesia. Zayas was sometimes referred to as the "erudite civilian president," because unlike his predecessor and his successor he did not have experience in the field of battle.

== Political career ==
Upon his return to Cuba after the Spanish–Cuban–American War (known in the U.S. as Spanish–American War), he became acting mayor of Havana. He was a member of the Constitutional Convention of 1901 and became its secretary. A vocal leader of the opposition against the U.S. annexation of Cuba, he voted against the Platt Amendment and against granting naval bases to the United States in Guantánamo and Bahia Honda.

From 1906 to 1909, Zayas served as one of six Cuban lawyers on the Advisory Law Commission for the Provisional Government of Cuba, under Colonel Enoch H. Crowder.

Zayas became leader of the Liberal Party (left-wing) and was elected Vice-president 1908. In the contested, 1916 presidential election in which the populist Liberal Party used violent tactics, he obtained more votes than the pro-U.S. candidate, Cornell graduate General Mario García Menocal. The Chambelona War ensued, which, after some reverses, was won by the Conservative Forces of Garcia Menocal with the covert support of the United States. Zayas surrendered in Cambute near Guanabacoa where it was said he was hiding. The United States provided military support to García Menocal from Guantánamo Naval Base, without formally invoking its right of intervention pursuant to the Platt Amendment, incorporated in the U.S.-Cuba Treaty of 1903. However, the United States only deployed forces in Oriente Province.

Receiving the most votes in the 1920 Cuban general election, which was marred by accusations of election fraud. Zayas was inaugurated as president on May 20, 1921.

He served only one term, during which he started the process to give the vote to Cuban women (resolution in the Senate, 1921), negotiated the return of Cuban sovereignty over the Isle of Pines (Isla de la Juventud, 2,204 square kilometers) which had been occupied by the U.S. since 1898 (Hay-Quesada Treaty of 1903), obtained a US$50 million loan from J.P. Morgan, and for the first time allowed full freedom of expression and of the press. On 10 October 1922 he launched PWX, the first Cuban radio station.

Although his administration was systematically defamed by the opposition as corrupt, it actually was less corrupt than preceding and subsequent administrations, and Zayas refrained from censoring the press or arresting critics, unlike prior and later Cuban presidents. This brought him the nickname "el Chino" (the Chinaman), because of his stoicism ("la flema de Zayas") and his "oriental patience". Sometimes he was also nicknamed "pesetero", because since his imprisonment in Madrid he had always carried a Spanish Peseta coin in his vest pocket. When he took office in 1921, the country was in bankruptcy, with debts exceeding US$40 million, and sugar prices plummeting from 22 cents to 3 cents per pound. In spite of this, he carried out a number of reforms, particularly in the field of education.

President Zayas, as well as other Cuban administrations, had to struggle with the implications of the Platt Amendment, which resulted in significant U.S. meddling in Cuban's financial affairs. Particularly, under the terms of the Platt Amendment, the Zayas administration needed either the implicit or the outright explicit approval of the U.S. when it came to securing large financial loans.

=== Presidential Cabinet members ===
- José Manuel Cortina, Executive Secretary
- Rafael Montoro Valdés, Secretary of State
- Demetrio Castillo Duany, Secretary of War and the Navy
- Francisco Zayas y Alfonso, Secretary of Education and Art
- Orlando Freyre y Cisneros, Secretary of Public Works
- Juan Guiteras, Secretary of Health
- Francisco Martínez Lufriú, Secretary of the Interior
- Erasmo Regüeiferos, Secretary of Justice
- José María Collantes, Secretary of Agriculture, Trade, and Labor

== Family life ==
In 1884, Zayas married Margarita Teresa Claudia del Carmen Arrieta y Diago and they had four children, Margarita (1886–1964), Alfredo (1888–1929), Francisco (1889–1934), and Maria-Teresa Zayas Arrieta (1892–1952). In 1914, he married a second time to Maria de la Asuncion Jaen y Planas, who served as Cuba's First Lady during Zayas's presidency. He had one other child out of wedlock, Alfredo Zayas y Mendez (1916- )

His great-grandson is the lawyer, UN employee, and historian Alfred-Maurice de Zayas.

== Later life ==
He did not run for reelection and devoted his last years to giving conferences and pursuing his manifold literary and historical interests, including the publication of his major work, the two-volume "Lexicografia Antillana", which had seen an earlier edition in 1914, and occupying the post of president of the "Academia de la Historia" until his death. In the next election Gerardo Machado was elected, but turned dictatorial, and after a series of coups that followed when Machado was forced to step down Fulgencio Batista rose to power.

== Bibliography ==
=== Alfredo Zayas ===
- Alfredo Zayas, "Obras Completas", Vol.I: Poesías, Vol.2 Discursos y Conferencias, La Habana 1941–42.
- Alfredo Zayas, "Un Capítulo de la Historia de Cuba", La Habana, 1916.
- Alfredo Zayas, "Lexicografía Antillana", Bd. 1–2, La Habana, 1931–32.
- Alfredo Zayas, "La Poesía Patriótica en Cuba hasta 1868", Academia Nacional de Artes y Letras, La Habana, 1931.
- Alfredo Zayas, "El presbiterio don José Augustin Caballero y su vida y sus obras", La Habana, 1891.
- Alfredo Zayas, "La Evolución Social" La Habana, 1891.
- Alfredo Zayas, "Por la Gloria de Luz y Caballero" La Habana 1909.

=== Other authors ===
- Juan Bruno Zayas de la Portilla: "Orígenes. Compendio Histórico-Genealógico del Linaje Zayas, Descendencia del Infante Don Jaime de Aragón". Zayas Publishing, Missouri, EE.UU. 2003, Vol. I, p. 413. www.origenesdezayas.com
- Nestor Carbonell Cortina: "Perfil Histórico del IV Presidente de Cuba Republicana Alfredo Zayas y Alfonso", San Juan, Puerto Rico 1985.
- Jose Manuel Carbonell, "Evolución de la Cultura Cubana". La Habana, Imp. Montalvo y Cardenas, 1928, Tomo III (La Oratoria en Cuba) pp. 102–105, Tomo IV, 30f.
- Juan J. Remos, "Historia de la Literatura Cubana", Miami, Mnemosyne Publishing Co., 136f.
- Vidal Morales, "Iniciadores y Primeros Mártires de la Revolucion Cubana", La Habana, La Moderna Poesia, 1931 Tomo III, pp. 113ff.
- Carlos Márquez Sterling, "Historia de Cuba", Miami, pp. 289ff.
- Carlos Márquez Sterling & Manuel Márquez Sterling, "Historia de la Isla de Cuba", 1975, New York, Regents Publishing Co. pp 178–181
- Fernando de Zayas, "Prosa y Versos", La Habana 1909
- Harry Frank Guggenheim, "The United States and Cuba: A Study in International Relations", New York, Arno Press, 1970, pp. 156ff.
- Francisco López Leiva: "Juan Bruno Zayas, General de Brigada del Ejército Libertador". La Habana, 1922.
- Emilio Roig de Leuchsenring, "Historia de la Enmienda Platt: Una Interpretacion de la Realidad Cubana", La Habana, 1935.
- Francisco Xavier de Santa Cruz, "Historia de Familias Cubanas", Editorial Hércules, La Habana, 1943.

See also the respective entries in the "Enciclopedia universal Espasa Calpe" and in Merriam Webster "New Biographical Dictionary".

=== Chambelona War ===
- González, Reynaldo 1978 Nosotros los liberales nos comimos la lechona. Editorial de Ciencias Sociales. Havana
- Waldemar Leon Caicaje: Batalla Final de una Revuelta. pp. 100–103, 113
- Morales y Morales, Vidal 1959 (printed 1962) Sobre la guerra civil de 1917. Documentos del Siglo XX, Boletín del Archivo Nacional. Volume 58 pp. 178–256.
- Portell Vila, Herminio La Chambelona en Oriente. pp. 12–13, 112–125.
