= Enrique José Varona =

Cuban author (1848-1933)

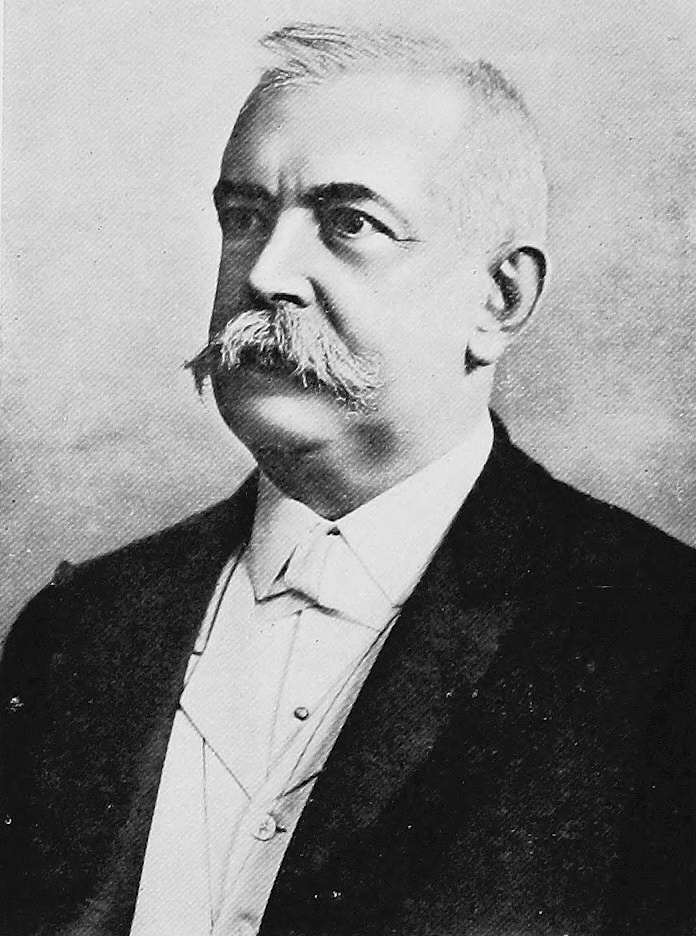

4th Vice President of Cuba
- In office 20 May 1913 – 20 May 1917
- President: Mario García Menocal
- Preceded by: Alfredo Zayas y Alfonso
- Succeeded by: Emilio Núñez

Enrique José Varona (April 13, 1848, Puerto Principe, Cuba – November 13, 1933, Havana) was a Cuban author.

He was educated in Puerto Principe, and began his literary career in 1864 as a contributor to reviews. In 1874, he moved to Havana, dividing his time between teaching and journalism. In 1885 he was elected representative for Puerto Principe in the Cortes in Madrid. In 1885 he founded the Revista Cubana, a literary, scientific, and philosophical review.

During the US Military Occupation of Cuba, Varona was appointed Minister of Finance, and later as Minister of Public Instruction. He was elected in 1912 as Vice President of Cuba under President Mario García Menocal. Varona retired to a private academic and literary life in 1917.

== Works ==
- Odas Anacreónticas (Puerto Principe, 1868)
- Poesías (Havana, 1878)
- Paisajes Cubanos (1879)
- Conferencias filosóficas: Lógica (1880)
- Conferencias filosóficas: Psicología (1881)
- Estudios literarios y filosóficos (1883)
- Seis Conferencias (Barcelona, 1887)

His Lógica has been translated into French.
