= Felipe González Sarrain =

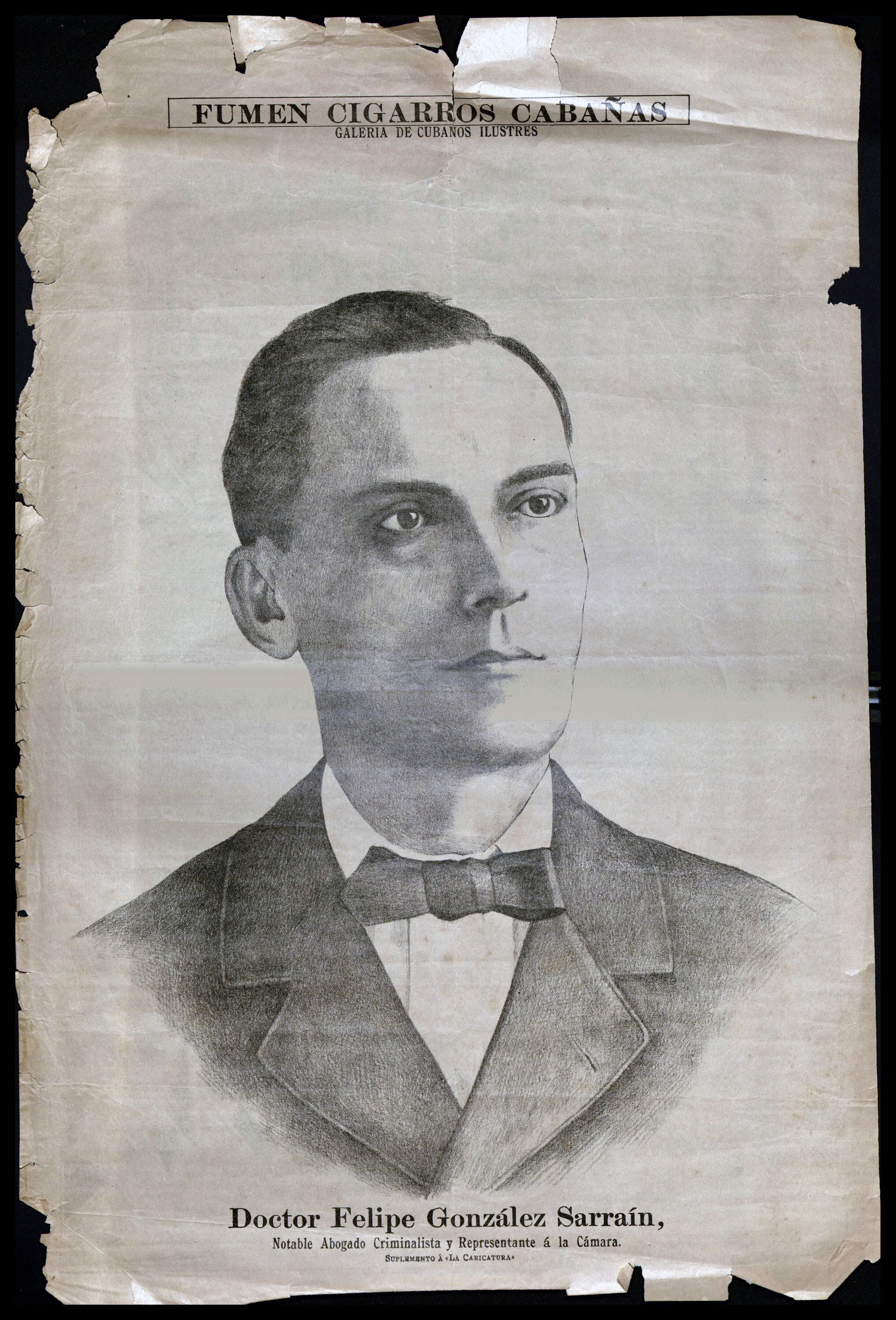

City Councilor for Havana
- In office Military Government of Cuba

Representative for the Congress of Cuba
- In office 1902–1906
- Constituency: Havana Province

Member of the Advisory Law Commission of Cuba for the Provisional Government of Cuba
- In office 1906–1909
- Commission Chair: Enoch Crowder

Representative for the Congress of Cuba
- In office 1908–1918
- Constituency: Havana Province

Personal details
- Born: May 1, 1868 Havana
- Died: June 17, 1931 (aged 63) Havana
- Party: Liberal Party of Cuba

Felipe González Sarrain was a Cuban lawyer, city councilor, member of the Advisory Law Commission of Cuba, and Congressional representative.

== Life ==
González Sarrain received his education at the Colegio de Belén, completing his studies for a bachelor's degree in 1883. He then attended university, where he studied law, earning a Licentiate degree in 1887 and a Doctorate in 1893.

Under the Military Government of Cuba, he served as a member of the Havana City Council and later acted as legal counsel for the council. He played a key role in establishing the Liberal Party, under which he was elected as a representative for Havana Province in 1902 and re-elected in 1904.

Under the Provisional Government of Cuba he became part of the Advisory Law Commission of Cuba, formed by Provincial Governor Charles Magoon and contributed to drafting new legislation implemented at that time.

In 1908 González Sarrain was once again elected as a representative for Havana Province, securing re-election in 1910 and 1914. Throughout his tenure in the Chamber, he was recognized for his strong parliamentary skills and effective public speaking.
