= Mario García Kohly =

Cuban diplomat (1875–1935)

Don Mario García Kohly
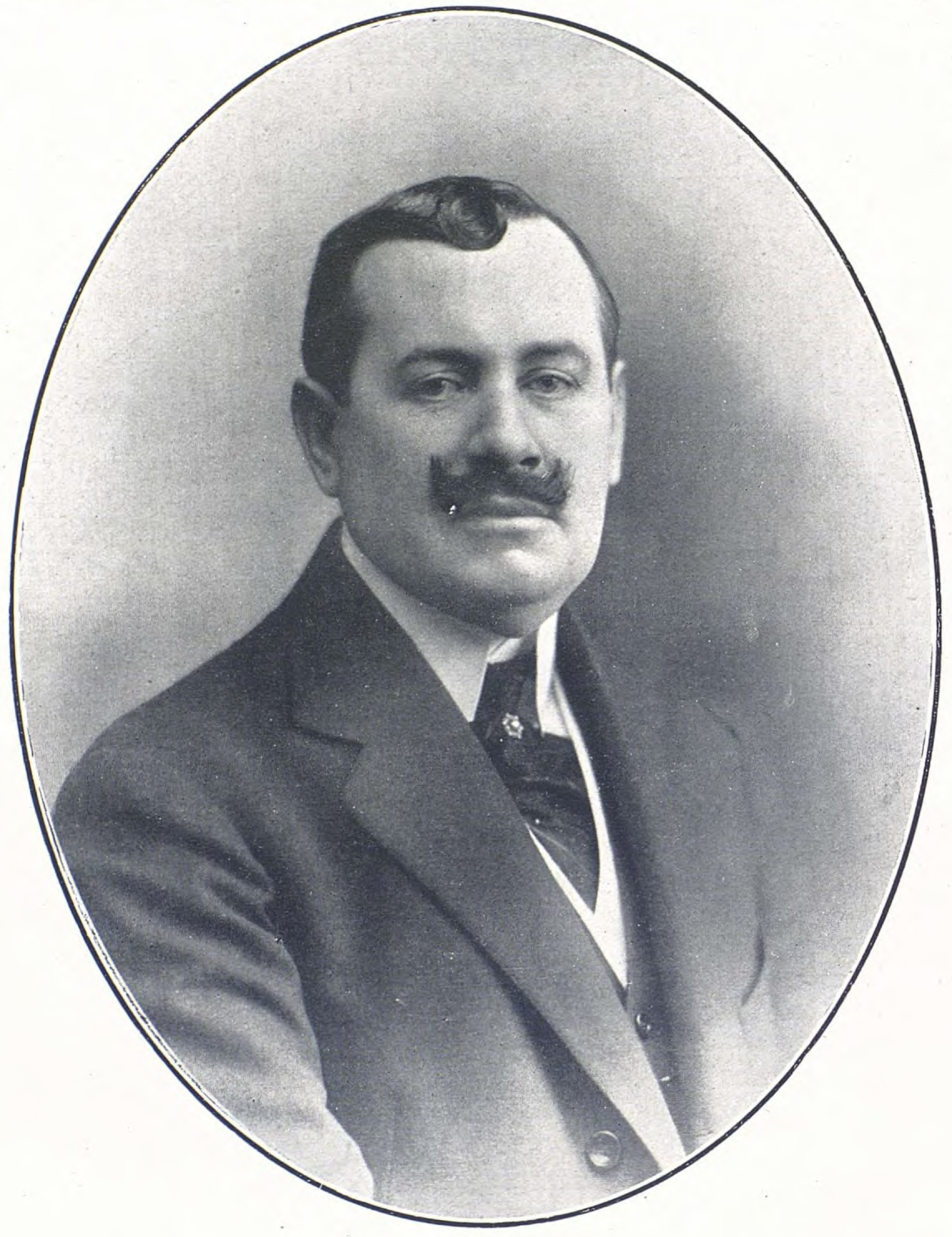

City Councilor for Havana
- In office 1901–1902

Deputy at the Congress of Cuba
- In office 1902

Chief of Cuban Immigration Office at the Cuban Embassy in Madrid
- In office 1902–?

Member of the Advisory Law Commission of Cuba
- In office 1906–1909

Envoy Extraordinary and Minister Plenipotentiary
- In office 1913–1924

Cuban Ambassador to Spain
- In office 1924–1933

Personal details
- Born: April 10, 1875 Havana
- Died: July 22, 1935 (Aged 64) Madrid
- Resting place: San Justo Cemetery
- Children: Mario García Kohley, Jr.
- Awards: Grand Cross of Carlos Manuel de Céspedes; Grand Red Cross of Cuba; Grand Cross of Isabel la Católica; Grand Cross of Alfonso XII; Commander of the Legion of Honor

Don Mario García Kohly was a Cuban journalist, author, and politician, who served on the Havana City Council, Presidential Cabinet of Mariano Gómez, the Congress of Cuba, and as the Cuban ambassador to Spain. When President Gerardo Machado was overthrown in 1933, García Kohly ran a failed Presidential campaign against Alberto Herrera Franchi. He was also the chair of the short-lived Havana Symphony Orchestra in 1910, which only performed six performances.

== Life ==
García Kohly was born in Havana in 1871. He completed his Law degree in the same city and was involved in political struggles in the years leading up to the Cuban War of Independence, forcing him to seek refuge in Mexico in 1895, where he began contributing to various newspapers, becoming known as a political and legal writer. At some point, he returned to Cuba.

Upon his return to his homeland, García Kohly wrote for the newspaper La Discusión and also founded El Patriota while serving as the director of Patria.

In 1901, he was elected to be a councilor for the Havana City Council. In 1902, he became a deputy in the Congress of Cuba.

He cut his congressional service short when he was appointed First Class Secretary at the Cuban Embassy in Madrid, Spain, managing the Cuban Immigration Office there.

He returned to Cuba years later to actively participate in its political life. Some of the fundamental and organic laws of his country are his work. From 1906 to 1909, García Kohly was a member of the Advisory Law Commission of Cuba.

At some point, Kohly served in the Presidential Cabinet, as Secretary of Public Instruction for President Miguel Mariano Gómez.

In 1913, he was promoted to Envoy Extraordinary and Minister Plenipotentiary. By 1926, when Cuba elevated its diplomatic representation, he assumed the role of ambassador in Madrid.

In 1913, García Kohly was appointed as an Extraordinary Envoy and Plenipotentiary Minister to Spain. In 1924, he took on the role of Cuban Ambassador to Spain.

Throughout his career, García Kohly worked to strengthen ties between Cuba and Spain. His writings and journalistic contributions reflected his deep respect and admiration for Spain. In 1933, he voluntarily stepped down as ambassador to manage a Presidential campaign bid, but remained a widely respected figure in Madrid's diplomatic circles. His affinity for Spain led to him being named an honorary doctorate from the Central University in October 1928. He was also a member of the Paris Academy of International Law and a Commander of the Legion of Honor.

He wrote numerous books, including;

- Laley Penal Militar (Military Penal Law)
- En la tierra de Juárez (In the Land of Juárez)
- Gambatta
- Franklin
- Grandes hombres de Cuba (Great Men of Cuba)

== See also ==
- Foreign relations of Cuba
