= Manuel María Coronado =

Cuban newspaper owner, lawyer, and politician

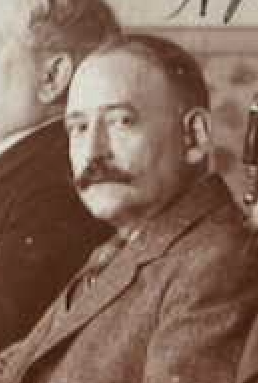

Member of the Advisory Law Commission of Cuba
- In office 1906–1909

Senator of Cuba
- In office November 1, 1912 – December 18, 1920
- Additional Office: Vice President of the Senate
- Constituency: Oriente Province

Personal details
- Born: May 19, 1860 Havana
- Died: December 18, 1920 (aged 60) Havana
- Party: Conservative Party of Cuba

Military service
- Branch/service: Cuban Liberation Army
- Rank: Colonel
- Commands: Auditor of the General Command of the Liberation Army
- Battles/wars: Little War; Cuban War of Independence

Manuel María Coronado Alvarado was a Cuban revolutionary soldier, lawyer, politician, and owner of one of the most popular newspapers in Cuba, La Discusión. Coronado also participated in joint venture to bring the first ever aircraft to the island of Cuba. He was the Vice President of the Cuban Senate at the time of his death.

== Life ==
In November 1879, Coronado joined the Little War in Las Villas as an Alférez (second lieutenant). In early 1895, at the behest of Major Generals Máximo Gómez and Antonio Maceo, he acquired the newspaper La Discusión to support the independence movement.

However, when Valeriano Weyler re-took possession of the island during the Cuban War of Independence, he shut down production of the newspaper.

Following the suspension of La Discusión in 1896, Coronado relocated to the United States. He later returned to Cuba as part of the Cuban Liberation Army, aboard the third expedition of the steamship Sommers N. Smith, which landed on September 15, 1897, at the mouth of the Arimao River in Cienfuegos, Las Villas, under Lieutenant Colonel Fernando Méndez's command.

After spending ten days in the Cienfuegos Brigade (2nd Brig. 2nd Div. 4th Corps), he was transferred to the Trinidad Brigade (3rd Brig. 1st Div. 4th Corps).

On December 31, 1897, he was appointed auditor of the General Command of the Liberation Army. He was promoted to Captain on September 15, 1897; to Commandant on January 27, 1898; to Lieutenant colonel on March 19, 1898; and to Colonel on April 8, 1898.

After the war, Coronado resumed publishing La Discusión, elevating it to become one of the most popular newspapers in Cuba. He was a founding member of the Conservative Party and served as a senator for Oriente province.

From 1906 to 1906, Coronado served as a member of the Advisory Law Commission of Cuba, which rewrote many of the laws of Cuba to disentangle the country from its former Spanish Imperial legal framework.

In 1910, Coronado, Ricardo Dolz Arango and Mario Díaz Irizar, purchased a French replica Blériot XI and displayed it in the portals of the Lombillo Palace, in the Plaza de la Catedral in Havana.
