= Cuba–Spain relations =

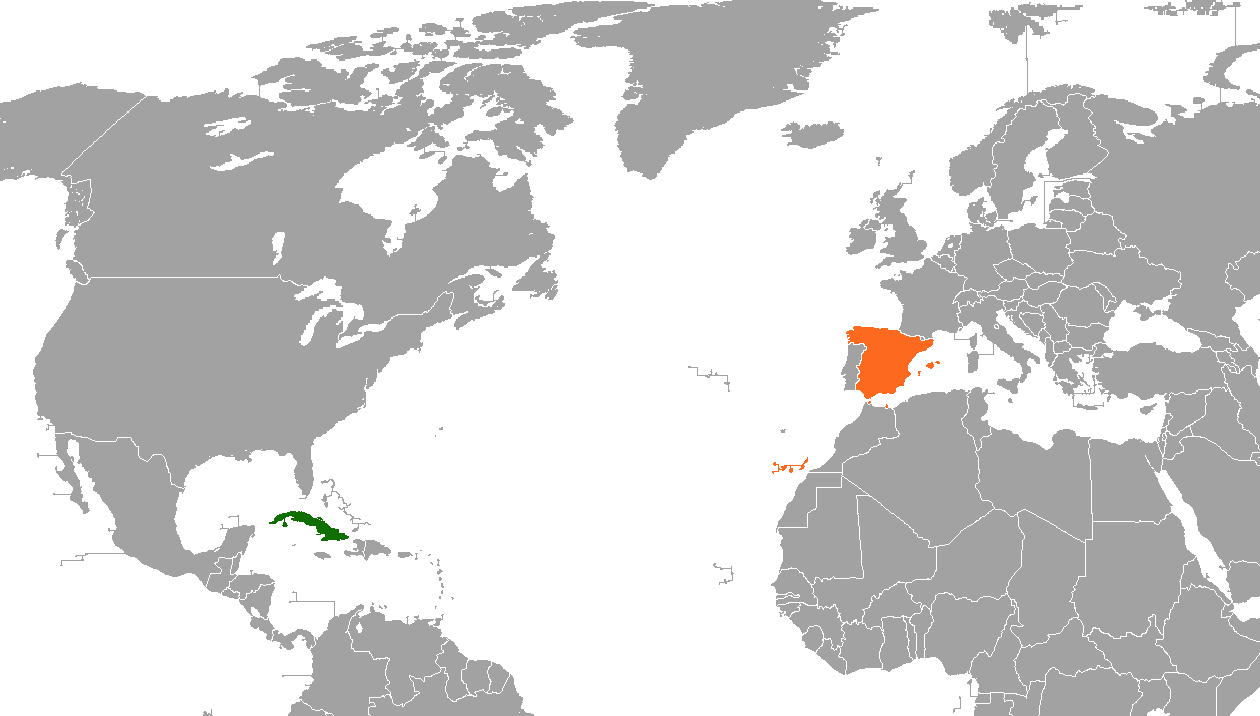

- Cuba: Spain

Diplomatic mission
- Embassy of Cuba, Madrid: Embassy of Spain, Havana

The bilateral relations between the Republic of Cuba and the Kingdom of Spain (Spanish: Relaciones entre la República de Cuba y el Reino de España) date back to the 15th century. Cuba was a Spanish colony from 1492 up until 1898, when the United States took over the territory in the Spanish–American War. Many Cubans have ancestry from Spain. Many Spaniards escaped the first Spanish Civil War and went to Cuba, and other countries, around 1820–1825.

== History ==
=== Spanish colonization ===
The first contact between Spain and the island of Cuba was in October 1492 when explorer Christopher Columbus arrived to Cuba. The first permanent Spanish settlement on the island began in 1511 when Spanish conquistador Diego Velázquez de Cuéllar established a settlement in Baracoa. Cuba would become the launching point for further Spanish exploration on the American continent. By 1521, Cuba became part of the Spanish Empire and was governed from the Viceroyalty of New Spain based in Mexico City.

During Spanish administration of Cuba, the island became a substantial producer of sugarcane and in order to meet global demands, Spain began to import slaves from Africa to work in Cuba. This made the economy of Cuba highly volatile to world prices as its economy depended on one single crop.

=== Independence ===
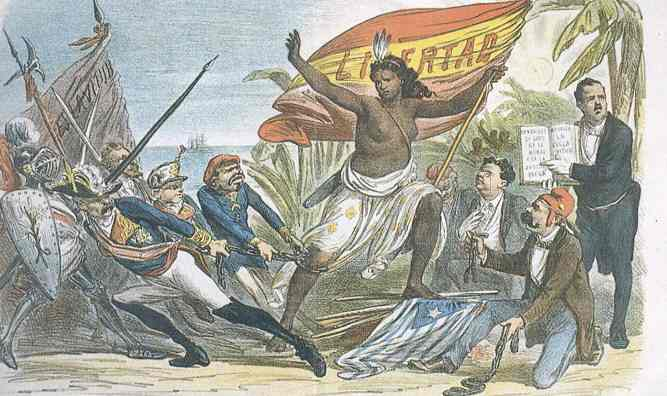
The call for Cuban Independence

By 1868, many countries in Latin America had obtained independence from Spain. In October 1868, Cuban planter and sugar mill owner Carlos Manuel de Céspedes and his followers proclaimed independence for Cuba. This proclamation led to the Ten Years' War with Spain and ended in the independence movement defeat in 1878. In August 1879, a second struggle ensued known as the Little War and lasted until September 1880 with the independence movement defeat once more.

In February 1895, a new independence struggle movement began and is known as the "Cuban War of Independence" and was led by Cuban Poet José Martí who died in May 1895 at the Battle of Dos Ríos. The war lasted until 1898 when the United States deployed forces to the island. That same year, American naval ship, USS Maine (ACR-1) exploded and sank in the Havana Harbor and resulted in the United States blaming the incident on Spain. This resulted in the Spanish–American War which began in April 1898 until August 1898. At the end of the war, the United States came out as the victors in the war and obtained Cuba as a possession and it resulted in the defeat and collapse of the Spanish Empire. In 1902, Cuba seceded from American governance and became an independent nation.

=== Post independence ===
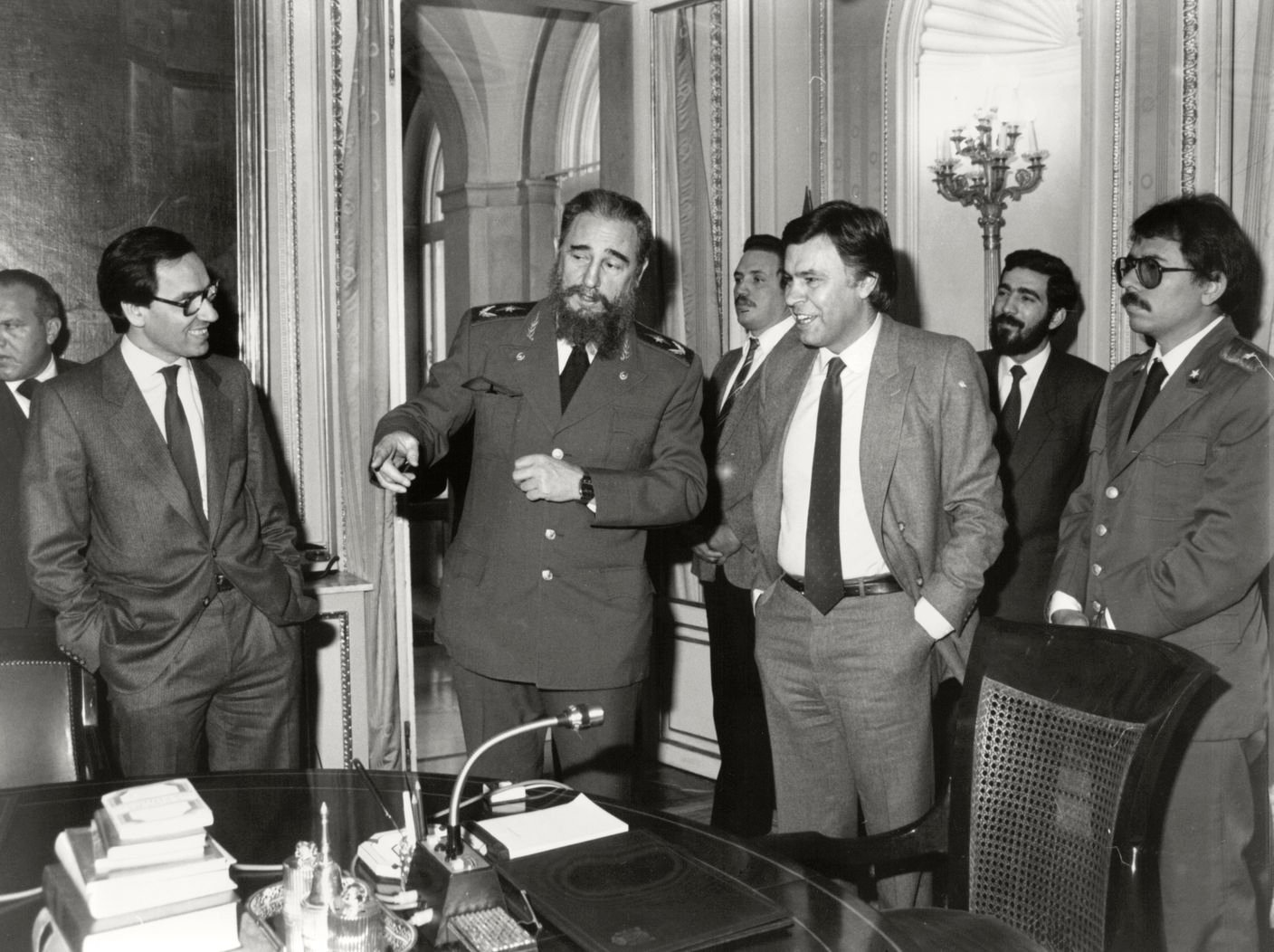
Spanish Prime Minister Felipe González with Cuban leader Fidel Castro in Madrid, accompanied by Daniel Ortega and Alfonso Guerra; February 1984.

The first Spanish consul general, José Felipe Sagrario arrived to Cuba in July 1899 during the US occupation. Spanish consul general Joaquín María Torroja became the chargé d'affaires after the formal establishment of the Cuban Republic in May 1902. In 1902, Cuba and Spain established diplomatic relations. Between 1902 and 1928, Cuba would receive more than 1.2 million Spanish immigrants.

During the Spanish Civil War (1936-1939), the Cuban government showed a neutral stance with inclinations to the Spanish Republican faction. In 1937, Cuban President Fulgencio Batista's position favored the Franco regime, reflecting his changing relations with the United States.

In spite of Franco's anticommunism, Cuba and Spain held diplomatic relations after Fidel Castro came into power and became Prime Minister of Cuba in 1959. In 1960, Prime Minister Castro expelled the Spanish ambassador Juan Pablo de Lojendio e Irure after an argument on TV, where Castro accused the Spanish embassy of supporting counter-revolutionary groups in Cuba. The Spanish ambassadorship in Cuba would remain vacant for the next 15 years, however, diplomatic relations between both nations continued at the level of chargé d'affaires.

During Franco's regime in Spain, Prime Minister Castro welcomed Spanish Republicans, such as the Communist Dolores Ibárruri, General Enrique Líster and Alberto Bayo, who had taught guerrilla warfare to the Cuban revolutionaries in Mexico. When the United States decreed an embargo against Cuba in 1960 and 1962, its Latin American and European allies followed suit, however, Francisco Franco did not place an embargo on Cuba. American pressure against the Spanish embargo breach was deflected by the renegotiation of the American military bases in Spain in 1963.

After Franco's death, Cuba decreed three days of mourning. In 1974, ambassadors between Cuba and Spain were appointed. After the Spanish transition to democracy, Spanish Prime Minister Adolfo Suárez visited Cuba in 1978.

In July 1992, Fidel Castro visited Spain for the first time to attend the 2nd Ibero-American Summit in Madrid. During his time in Spain, Castro also paid a visit to the town of Láncara in Galicia where his father was born. Castro returned to Spain in 1998 to meet with Spanish Prime Minister José María Aznar.

In November 1999, Spanish monarch Juan Carlos I paid an official visit to Cuba and to attend the 9th Ibero-American Summit being held in Havana. He returned to Cuba in 2016 to attend Fidel Castro's funeral.

In 2018, Spanish Prime Minister, Pedro Sánchez made an official visit to Cuba. While in Cuba, Prime Minister Sánchez met with Cuban President Miguel Díaz-Canel and both leaders signed a memorandum for the establishment of permanent political contacts through annual meetings. In November 2019, Felipe VI paid a state visit to Cuba.

== High-level visits ==
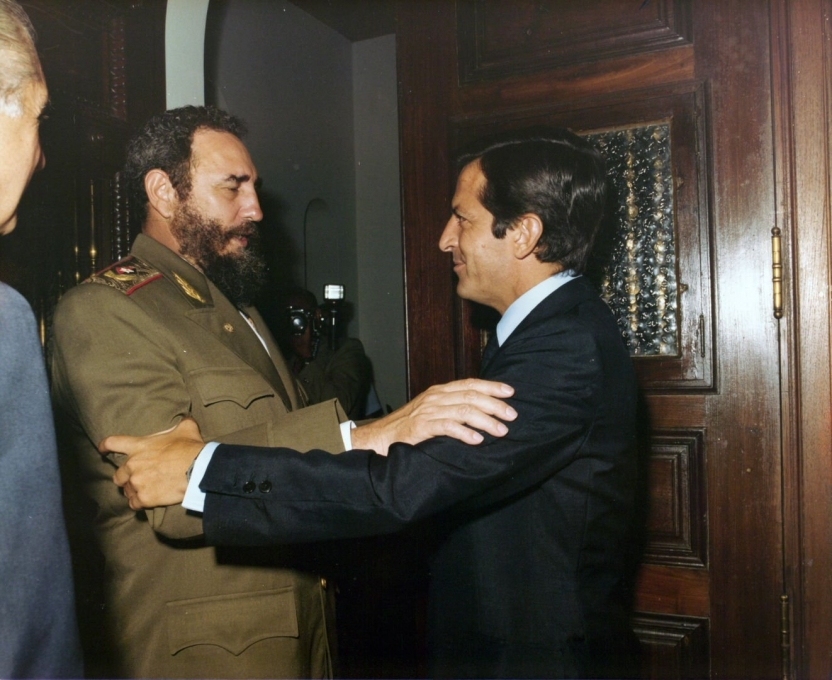
Cuban President Fidel Castro and Spanish Prime Minister Adolfo Suárez in Havana; 1978.

High-level visits from Cuba to Spain

- President Fidel Castro (1984, 1992, 1996, 1998)
- Vice President Raúl Castro (2005)

Royal and Prime Ministerial visits from Spain to Cuba

- Prime Minister Adolfo Suárez (1978)
- Prime Minister Felipe González (1986)
- King Juan Carlos I (1999)
- Prime Minister José María Aznar (1999)
- Prime Minister Pedro Sánchez (2018)
- King Felipe VI (2019)

== Bilateral relations ==
Over the years, both nations have signed numerous bilateral agreements, such as an Extradition Treaty (1905); Scientific and Technical Agreement (1978); Trade Agreement (1982); Cultural and Education Cooperation Agreement (1982); Promotion and Protection of Investments Agreement (1994); Double-Taxation Avoidance Agreement (1999) and an Air Transportation Agreement (2005), among others.

== Transportation ==
There are direct flights between Cuba and Spain through the following airlines: Air Europa, Cubana de Aviación, Iberia, Iberojet, and World2fly.

== Trade ==
In 2024, trade between Cuba and Spain totaled €832 million Euros. Cuba's main exports to Spain include shrimp, rum, tobacco, and sugar cane. Spain's main exports to Cuba include machinery, food, automobile parts, and electrical equipment. Spain is the largest foreign investor in Cuba from the European Union; Cuba is Spain's 42nd largest trading partner globally and 4th largest from Latin America (after Mexico, Brazil and Chile).

== Resident diplomatic missions ==
of Cuba in Spain

- Madrid (Embassy)
- Madrid (Consulate-General)
- Barcelona (Consulate-General)
- Las Palmas (Consulate-General)
- Santiago de Compostela (Consulate-General)
- Seville (Consulate-General)

of Spain in Cuba

- Havana (Embassy)
- Havana (Consulate-General)
- Camagüey (Consulate-General)

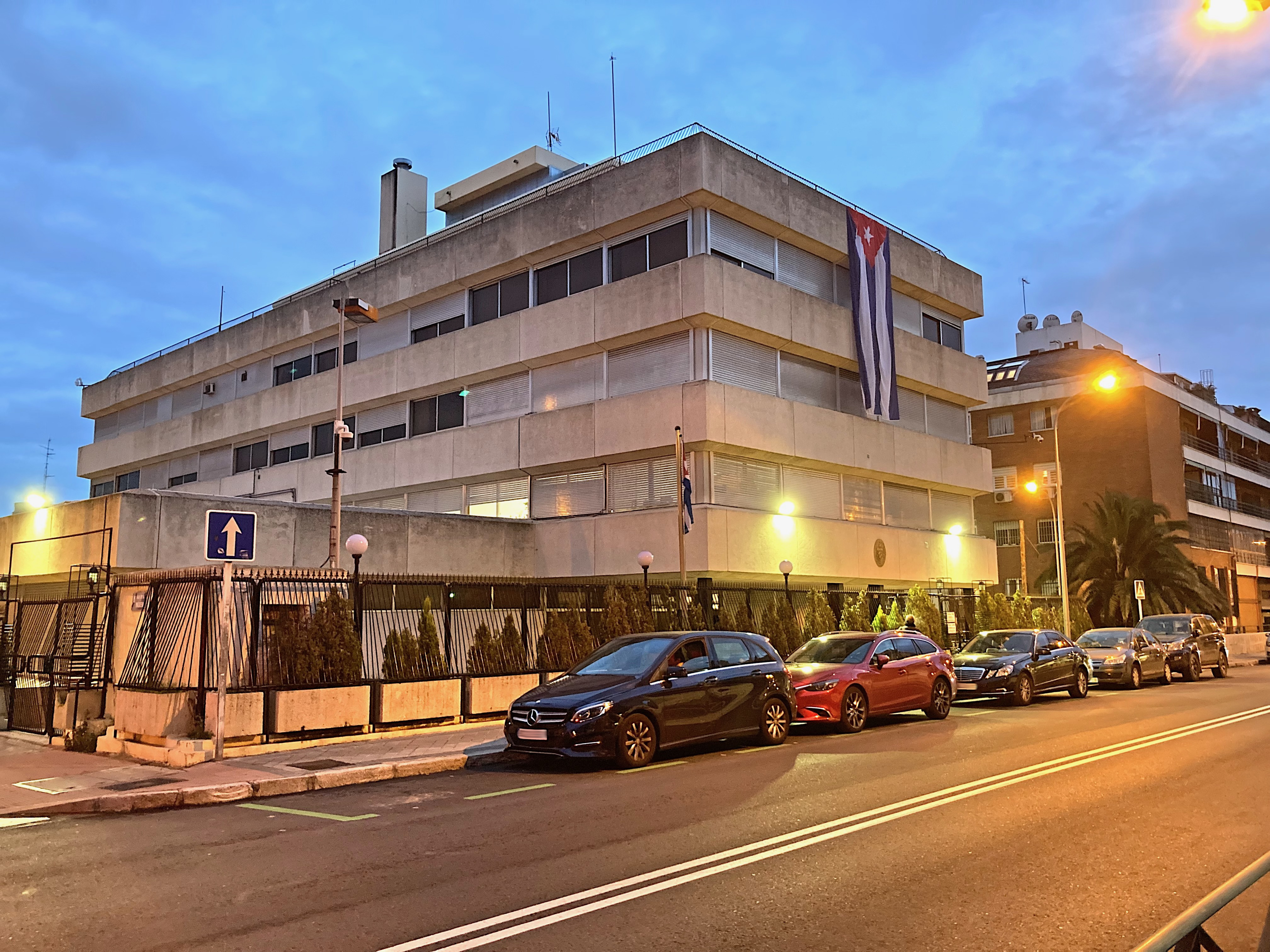
Embassy of Cuba in Madrid

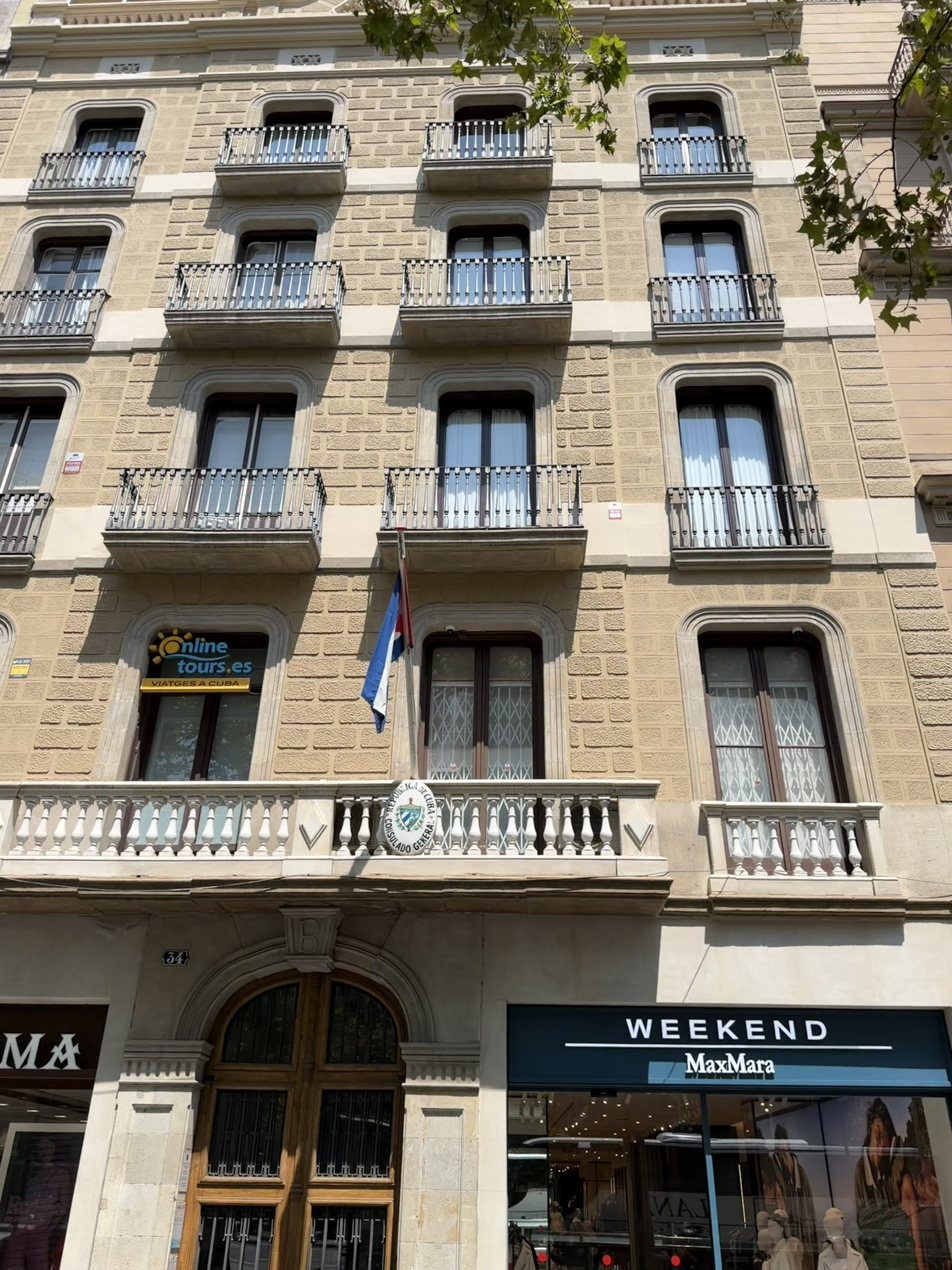
Consulate-General of Cuba in Barcelona

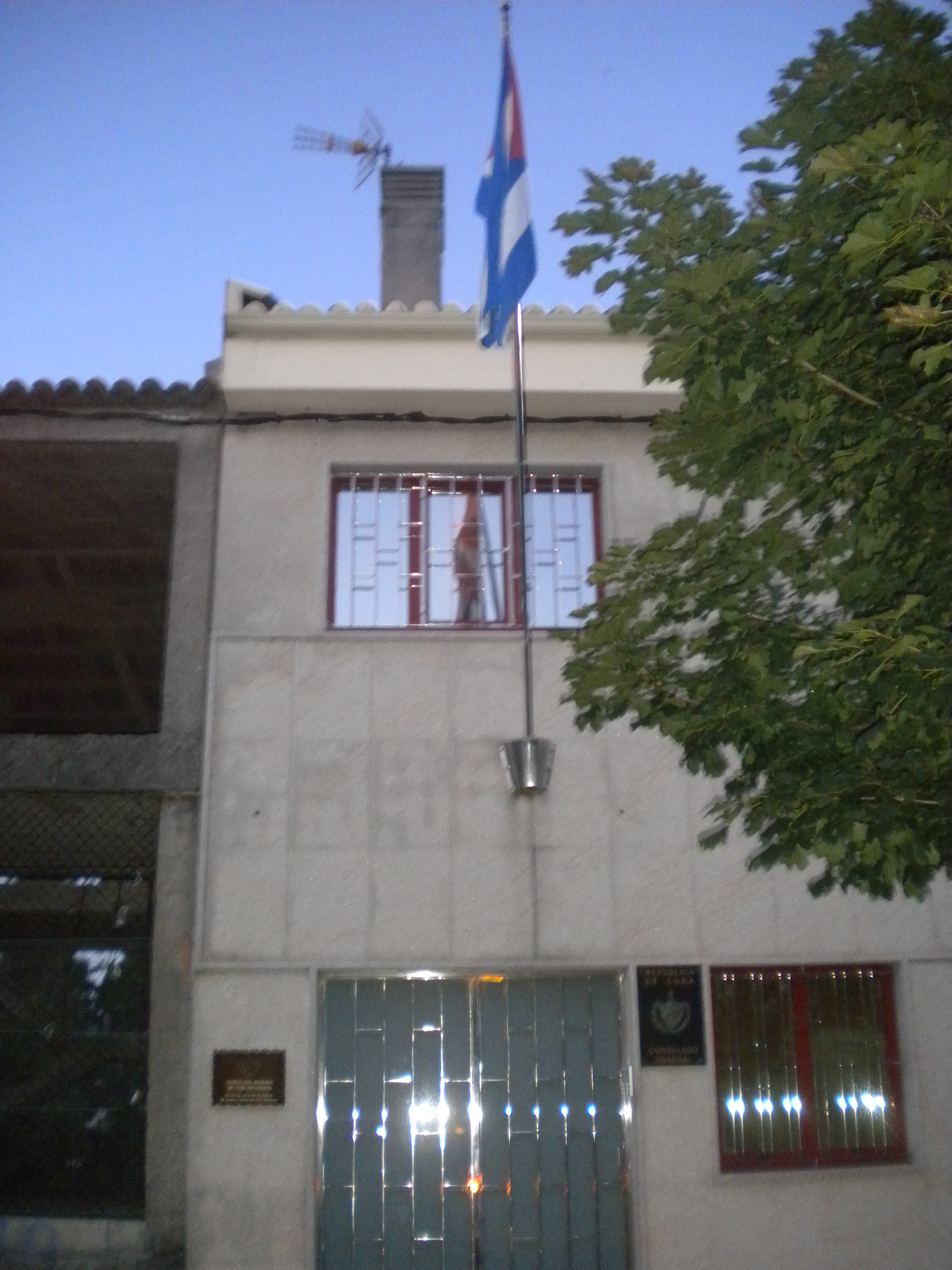
Consulate-General of Cuba in Santiago de Compostela
Embassy of Spain in Havana

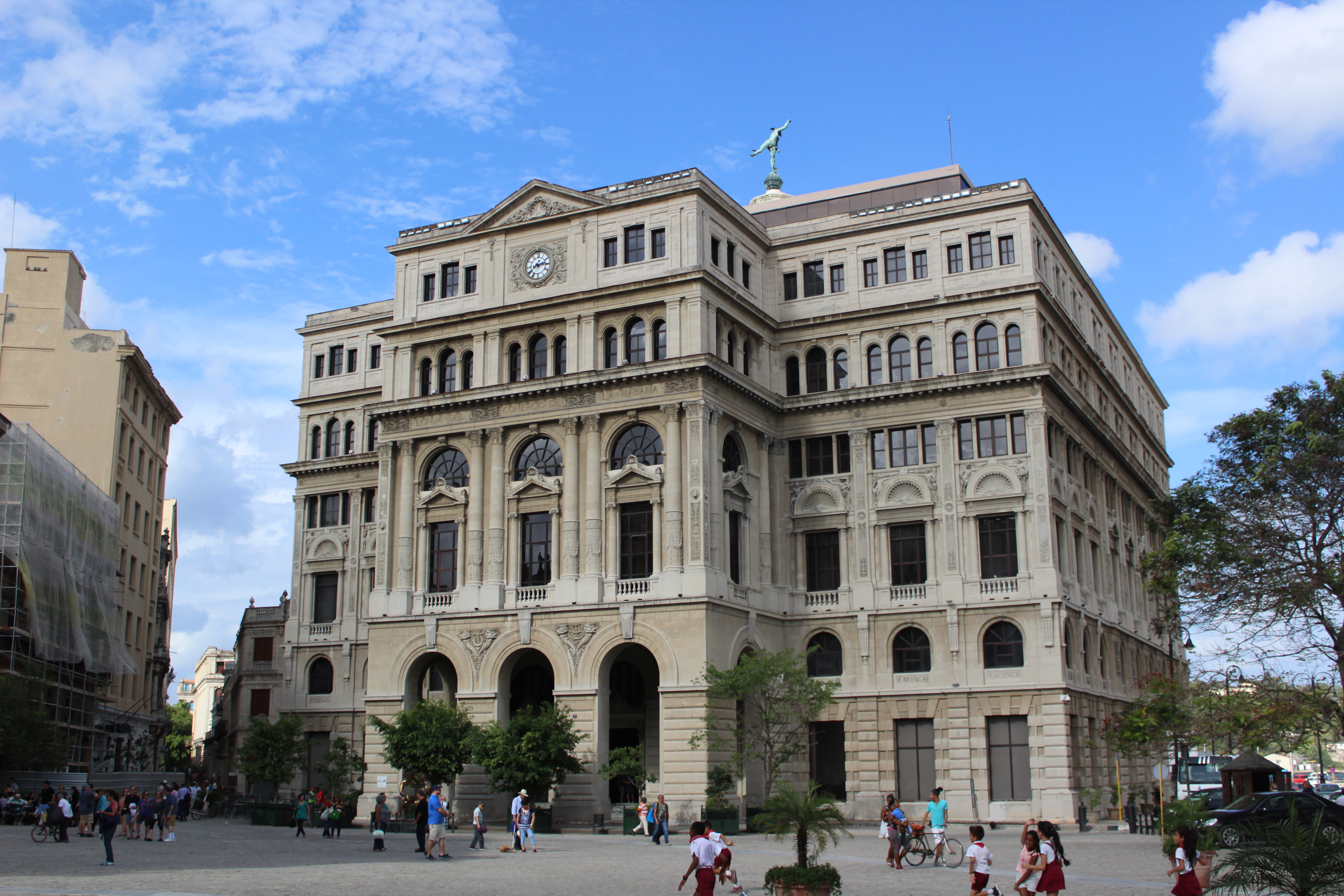
Building hosting the Consulate-General of Spain in Havana

== See also ==
- List of ambassadors of Spain to Cuba
- Spanish immigration to Cuba
