= Mario García Cames =

Uruguayan diplomat and sports leader (1883–1951)

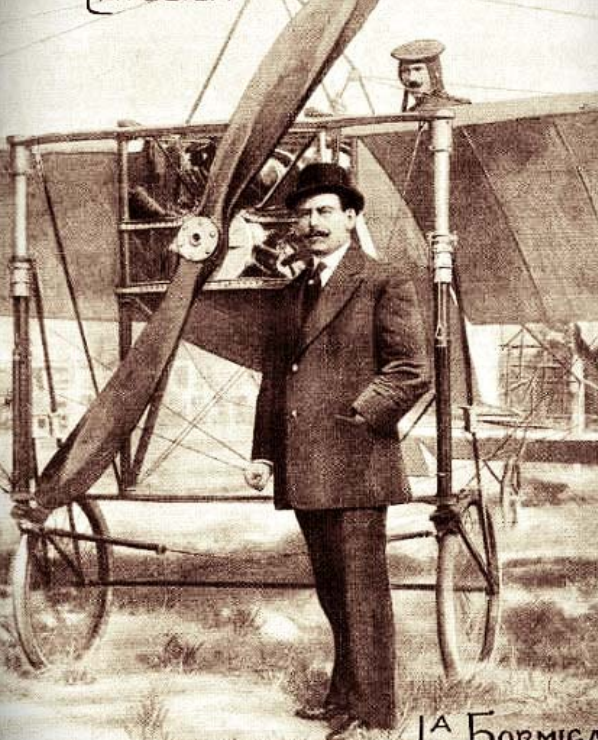
- García Cames with his airplane. Behind him, pilot Julien Mamet
- Born: 22 July 1883; San José de Mayo, Uruguay
- Died: 26 December 1951 (aged 68); Libertad, Uruguay
- Citizenship: Uruguayan
- Occupations: Diplomat; Aviation pioneer; Sports leader
- Known for: 5th President of the CD Tenerife

5th President of Tenerife Sporting Club
- In office October 1919 – October 1920
- Preceded by: Abelardo Sacramento Molowny
- Succeeded by: Melchor Ordóñez

7th President of Tenerife Sporting Club
- In office May 1921 – November 1921
- Preceded by: Melchor Ordóñez
- Succeeded by: Ricardo Martín

1st President of CD Tenerife
- In office 8 August 1922 – January 1924
- Preceded by: Jacinto Casariego
- Succeeded by: Juan Muñoz Pruneda

Mario García Cames (22 July 1883 – 26 December 1951) was a Uruguayan diplomat, aviation pioneer, and sports leader who served as the first president of the Spanish club CD Tenerife between 1922 and 1924.

In the early 1910s, he became a prominent promoter of aviation in the Iberian Peninsula, organizing the first documented complete flights in the history of Barcelona, Madrid, and Lisbon.

== Early life and education ==
Mario García Cames was born in the city of San José de Mayo, Eastern Republic of Uruguay, on 22 July 1883, as the son of Isidro García Curbelo, a Canarian merchant, and the Uruguayan Cipriana Cames Ferreyra. In 1900, the restless and adventurous García Cames decided to drop out from his studies in the University of Brussels for the sake of pursuing a sporting career, something that was within his reach thanks to both his "extraordinary physical abilities", and his family's comfortable socioeconomic position, which covered all of its expenses.

== Sporting career ==
García Cames began his sporting career by cycling with several Swiss teams, such as the Plainpalais Cycling Club in Geneva, and the Roue Libre club in Carouge. A versatile athlete, however, he soon practiced many other sports, such as weightlifting, participating in the Swiss Strength Championship in Geneva in 1905; motorcycling, conducting tourist excursions through Switzerland and the French Savoy; and car racing, participating in the Coupe d'Ostende in September 1908, one of the most important motor races of the time, where he drove a vehicle from the prestigious Belgian brand Pipe.

== Aviation pioneer ==
Perhaps inspired by the historic flight of French pilot Louis Blériot, who had crossed the English Channel on 25 July 1909, García Cames enrolled at the newly opened Blériot Aviation School in Pau, Pyrénées-Atlantiques in late 1909, where he met Frenchman Julien Mamet, one of Blériot's most accomplished disciples. Thanks to his family's wealth, he was able to buy a Blériot XI airplane shortly after taking his first lessons. In early 1910, some members of the newly established Asociación de Locomoción Aérea, based in Barcelona, traveled to Paris where they offered significant sums to a pilot willing to fly in the Catalan capital, which turned out to be Mamet, who agreed to fly the plane owned by his disciple, García Cames. Knowing Mamet's virtues, García Cames was calm and confident when the plane took off from the Can Tunis racetrack on 11 February 1910, traveling about 2 kilometers in a flight that lasted 2 minutes and 8 seconds. This was the catalyst for many more flights in the Catalan capital in the following days, with the audience attendance exceeding even the most optimistic predictions, as they were eager to see the "artificial bird".

García Cames went on to become a prominent promoter of aviation in the Iberian Peninsula, organizing these flights at the newly inaugurated Ciudad Lineal aerodrome in Madrid in March 1910, which was followed by the Belem aerodrome in Lisbon in April. The displays in Barcelona, Madrid, and Lisbon went down as the first documented complete flights in history in these cities. He then took his business to the Malvarrosa beach in Valencia in May, where the contractual relationship between him and Mamet was severed, so García Cames decided to become a pilot, which he achieved just a few months later, on 8 November, thus becoming the first civil aviation pilot in Uruguay.

== Life in Tenerife ==
In the mid-1910s, García Cames married a young native of Montevideo, María Esther Sayago Velazco, with the couple soon moving to Santa Cruz de Tenerife, where they settled at number 15 on Calle de Emilio Calzadilla. Shortly after, on 24 October 1916, he was appointed vice-consul of the Oriental Republic of Uruguay in Tenerife, the city where his three children were born: Mario (1917), Rosa (1919), and José Antonio (1920). Well integrated into the Tenerife society, he participated in several banquets organized in honor of the theater producer Ildefonso Maffiotte (1919 and 1922) and the poet Manuel Verdugo Bartlett (1922).

In October 1919, García Cames was appointed president of the city's football club, Tenerife Sporting Club. The following month, in November, Tenerife faced Real Betis, which marked the first time that a team from the peninsula visited the island, albeit the negotiations had been initiated by the previous president, Abelardo Sacramento Molowny. In September 1920, he offered a trophy, the artistic Copa del Camping Club del Uruguay, to the winners of a match between Tenerife and the champion team from Las Palmas. The following month, however, he stepped down from the presidency for the sake of one of his trips to Uruguay, but he again assumed the club's reins in May 1921, just to step down six months later, in November 1921.

On 8 August 1922, García Cames, together with his ten colleagues, reorganized the extinct Tenerife Sporting Club into CD Tenerife, with him being elected as the club's first-ever president. In the club's first season in 1922–23, the Tenerife team played 52 matches, winning the Copa La Suprema, the Sixto Machado Medallion, and beating several Madeiran teams during the celebrations of the 500th anniversary of the discovery of Madeira in late 1922, as well as a 7–1 trashing of Cádiz in May 1923, and a 1–0 win over Celta de Vigo in July 1923. It was around that time that Ángel Arocha made his debut with CD Tenerife, who went on to become one of FC Barcelona's all-time top scorers.

García Cames held the presidency for nearly two years, from 1922 until January 1924, when he was replaced by vice president Juan Muñoz Pruneda, having obtained a posting as consul in Pernambuco, Brazil.

== Later life ==
In May 1929, García Cames was appointed consul in Biarritz, France, a position that he held for over seven years, until September 1936, when he obtained a new posting in Turin, Italy.

== Death ==
García Cames died in Libertad on 26 December 1951, at the age of 68.
