= Mario García (judge) =

United States magistrate judge

Magistrate Judge of the United States District Court for the Southern District of Indiana
- Incumbent
- Assumed office April 5, 2021

Personal details
- Born: Bloomington, Indiana
- Education: Ball State University (BA); Indiana University Robert H. McKinney School of Law (JD)

Mario García is a magistrate judge of the United States District Court for the Southern District of Indiana.

== Early life and education ==
Garcia was born in Bloomington, Indiana. His mother is Polish American and his father is an immigrant from Mexico. Mario Garcia earned a Bachelor of Arts degree in criminal justice and criminology from Ball State University in 1995 and Juris Doctor from Indiana University Robert H. McKinney School of Law in 1999. While at Indiana University School of Law, Garcia was awarded the Cale J. Holder Scholarship and F. Emerson Boyd Scholarship. He was also a member of the Order of the Barristers and the Hispanic Law Society.

== Career ==
Garcia joined the Indianapolis law firm of Brattain & Minnix (later known as Brattain Minnix Garcia) as an associate after he graduated law school. He became a partner in the firm in 2008 and eventually served as its Managing Member. Garcia is also a registered civil mediator. Garcia represented indigent clients as a member of the Southern District of Indiana's Criminal Justice Act panel. He also provided pro bono services to participants in the District Court's Re-Entry and Community Help (REACH) Program, which helps individuals re-entering society after incarceration.

Garcia served on the United States Sentencing Commission's Practitioner's Advisory Group as the Seventh Circuit Representative and on the District Court's Local Rules Advisory Committee for the Southern District of Indiana (Nov 2017 - 2021). He served as a Trustee and Vice Chairman of the board of trustees for The Orchard School and Member of the board of directors for La Plaza, Inc. (formerly The Hispanic Center, Inc., where he served as board chairman). He also served as chairman of the board for the Indiana Federal Community Defenders, Inc.

On April 5, 2021, Garcia was sworn in as Magistrate Judge of the United States District Court for the Southern District of Indiana, becoming the first judge of Hispanic heritage to serve Southern District of Indiana. 31 applicants applied and a selection committee recommended five candidates for the position Garcia was selected for.

== Personal life ==
Garcia regularly spends time volunteering for the Alzheimer's Association Greater Indiana Chapter.
