= Rafael Montoro =

Cuban politician, lawyer, historian, writer and literary critic

Marquis of Montoro Rafael Montoro
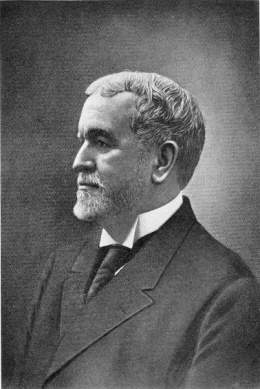

Personal details
- Born: October 24, 1852; Havana
- Died: August 14, 1933 (Aged 80); Havana

Rafael Montoro y Valdés (1852–1933) was a Cuban and Spanish politician, lawyer, historian, writer and literary critic, who became Cuban nationalized after the independence of Cuba. His basic training was influenced by the German philosophers Immanuel Kant and Georg Wilhelm Friedrich Hegel. He stood out for his brilliant and eloquent oratory. He took part in the brief Cuban autonomous government of 1898, as Secretary of the Treasury.

== Life ==
Rafael Montoro was born in Havana, Cuba, at that time known as the Captaincy General of Cuba. He completed his training in his hometown and in the 1862-1863 academic year he studied at the school of El Salvador.

At the age of twelve he moved to Europe, where he visited England and France, and the United States. He completed his basic studies in New York in 1866, returning to Cuba the following year enrolling in the San Francisco de Asís school where he received his first oratory classes from Antonio Zambrana.

=== Residence in Madrid ===
He returned to France in 1868, and moved to Spain to settle in Madrid. In the capital of Spain, he enrolled in university to study law. He collaborated in the Revista Contemporánea in which he published several articles, and actively participated in the work of the Ateneo where he coincided with relevant figures of Madrid's intellectual life such as Cánovas, Azcárate and Castelar. He was secretary of the Association of Spanish Writers and Artists. During his stay in the Iberian Peninsula, he met the father of Cuban independence, José Martí.

In 1897 King Alfonso XIII granted him the title of "Marquis of Montoro."

=== Return to Cuba ===
In 1878 he returned to the island and founded together with José María Gálvez Alonso the Liberal Autonomist Party of Cuba of which he was its leader and ideologue for more than twenty years. Eight years after the foundation, Rafael Montoro was elected deputy in the Spanish Cortes. Two years earlier he had graduated in Civil and Canon Law from the University of Havana.

In 1898 he acted as secretary of Finance of the brief autonomist government and upon obtaining independence he held various positions in the different governments, occupying, in the period between 1921 and 1925, the Secretary of State under the presidency of Mario García Menocal, he had already been secretary of the Presidency between 1913 and 1921. In 1908 he had tried to make a pact with the Conservative Party to obtain the vice presidency, but they did not get the agreement.

In 1910, the National Academy of Arts and Letters was founded in Cuba, in which Montoro appeared as a member since its foundation. In 1926 he entered the Royal Spanish Academy.

Rafael Montoro died in his hometown in 1933.

== His work ==
Montoro's work was extensive and diverse with philosophical, sociological, economic and political themes, as well as in the. He published more than 350 articles in different written media, both from Cuba and Spain. His parliamentary speeches, those of the Spanish Cortes and the Congress of Cuba, as well as political ones and conferences have been published in the United States. They are an example of clear and rich oratory. Almost all of his work has been published, in four volumes, in Cuba, two years before his death.

== Bibliography ==
- Biography of Rafael Montoro
- Article by Rafael Montoro
