= Enoch Crowder =

American Army lawyer (1859–1932)

Enoch Herbert Crowder
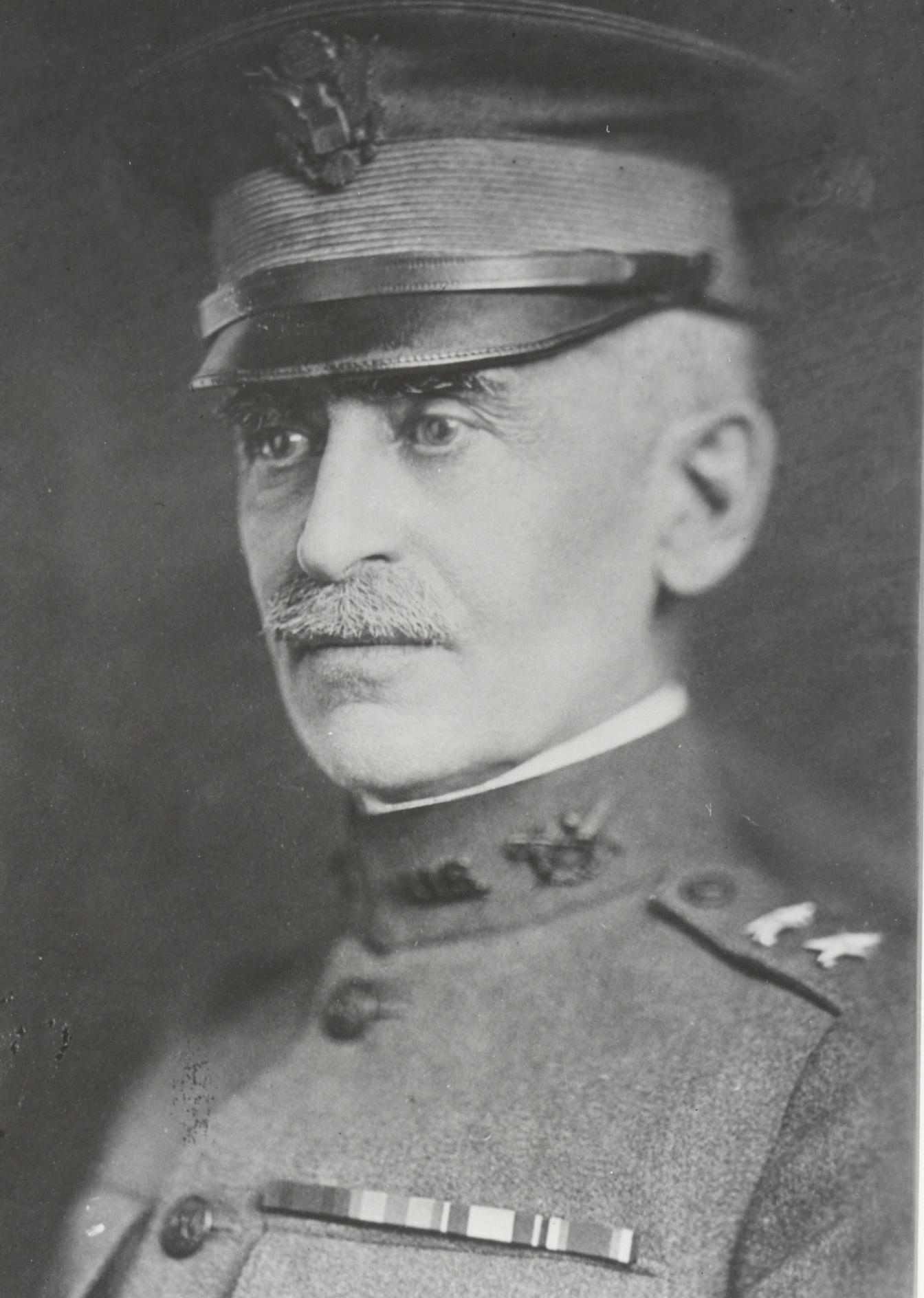
- Major General Enoch Herbert Crowder; 13th Judge Advocate General of the United States Army
- Born: April 11, 1859; Edinburg, Missouri
- Died: May 7, 1932 (aged 73); Washington, D.C.
- Burial place: Arlington National Cemetery; Arlington, Virginia
- Military career
- Allegiance: United States
- Branch: United States Army
- Service years: 1881–1923
- Rank: Major General
- Service number: 0-10
- Commands: Judge Advocate General
- Conflicts: American Indian Wars; Spanish–American War; Russo-Japanese War; World War I
- Awards: Distinguished Service Medal

Major General Enoch Herbert Crowder, USA (April 11, 1859 – May 7, 1932) was an American Army lawyer who served as the Judge Advocate General of the United States Army from 1911 to 1923. Crowder is most noted for implementing and administering the United States Selective Service Act of 1917, under which thousands of American men were drafted into military service during World War I.

== Early life and education ==
Enoch Crowder was born in Edinburg, Missouri in 1859. After graduating from Grand River College at 16, he taught at local schools until applying for the United States Military Academy (USMA) at West Point, New York on the advice of his mother, Mary Crowder. He entered West Point in 1877, graduating 31st of 53 in 1881. Lieutenant Crowder was assigned to the 8th Cavalry, stationed around Brownsville, Texas. During this tour he studied law and received a license to practice law in Texas in 1884. The same year, Crowder obtained a transfer to the Jefferson Barracks in Missouri.

In 1885, Lieutenant Crowder was assigned Professor of Military Science at the University of Missouri. Here he instructed two companies of cadets and created the first ROTC cadet band in the United States, which later became known as Marching Mizzou. While at Missouri, he obtained a law degree and became a member of the Zeta Phi chapter of Beta Theta Pi. Soon after graduating in 1886, Crowder was promoted to First Lieutenant and ordered to rejoin his regiment as a troop commander in the Geronimo campaign. Following the campaign's conclusion in September 1886, he resumed teaching at the University of Missouri until 1889.

== Judge Advocate General ==
Upon completion of this detail, Lieutenant Crowder returned to the 8th Cavalry at Fort Yates, Dakota Territory, where he participated in the final campaign against Sitting Bull. In 1891, upon his promotion to captain he accepted a position as the acting Judge Advocate General of the Department of the Platte in Omaha, Nebraska. In January 1895, this temporary branch transfer became final and Crowder was promoted to major.

The beginning of the Spanish–American War marked his promotion to lieutenant colonel. From 1898 to 1901, while in the Philippines, he served as a judge advocate, and later served as secretary to the island governors, one of whom was Arthur MacArthur Jr., father of Douglas MacArthur. He also served on the commission which arranged the Spanish surrender of the Philippines. During his service in the Philippines, he filled many important posts in the military government of the Islands, specializing in military law. In 1899, he headed the Board of Claims, served on the Philippine Supreme Court, and drafted the new Philippine criminal code. While in the Philippines, Crowder impressed then Governor General William Howard Taft with his legal acumen. Taft had Crowder serve as a de facto advisor to the Vatican's counsel regarding the transfer of "friars' lands" to Philippine nationals in an attempt to create a system of indigenous land ownership in the hopes that the people of the Philippines would have a stake in their eventual independence.

Impressed with the ability Crowder had demonstrated in the Philippines, Judge Advocate General Davis in 1901 called him to Washington to serve as deputy judge advocate general. In this capacity, Crowder assisted in the prosecution of the then noteworthy Deming case in 1902, became a member of the general staff, and attained the rank of colonel. In the Russo-Japanese War of 1904–1905 he was senior American observer with the Japanese Army. From 1906 to 1909, while serving on the staff of the provisional governors in Cuba, he oversaw the Cuban elections in 1908, and later helped draft a body of laws for Cuba.

In 1910, he represented the United States at the Fourth Pan American Conference in Buenos Aires and in that capacity made official visits to Chile, Peru, Ecuador, Colombia, and Panama. On February 11, 1911, after studying the military justice and penal systems of France and England on a European tour, he returned to Washington to be promoted to brigadier general and assume the duties as Judge Advocate General of the United States Army, a post he held for 12 years.

As Judge Advocate General, General Crowder initiated a number of innovations, including the regular publication of Judge Advocate General opinions; the issuance of a new digest (published in 1912) of all JAG opinions issued since 1862; and a program for the legal education of line officers at government expense. He additionally supervised the revision of the Articles of War for the first time since 1874, revised the Manual for Courts-Martial and took an active part in prison reform in the army.

== Selective Service Act ==
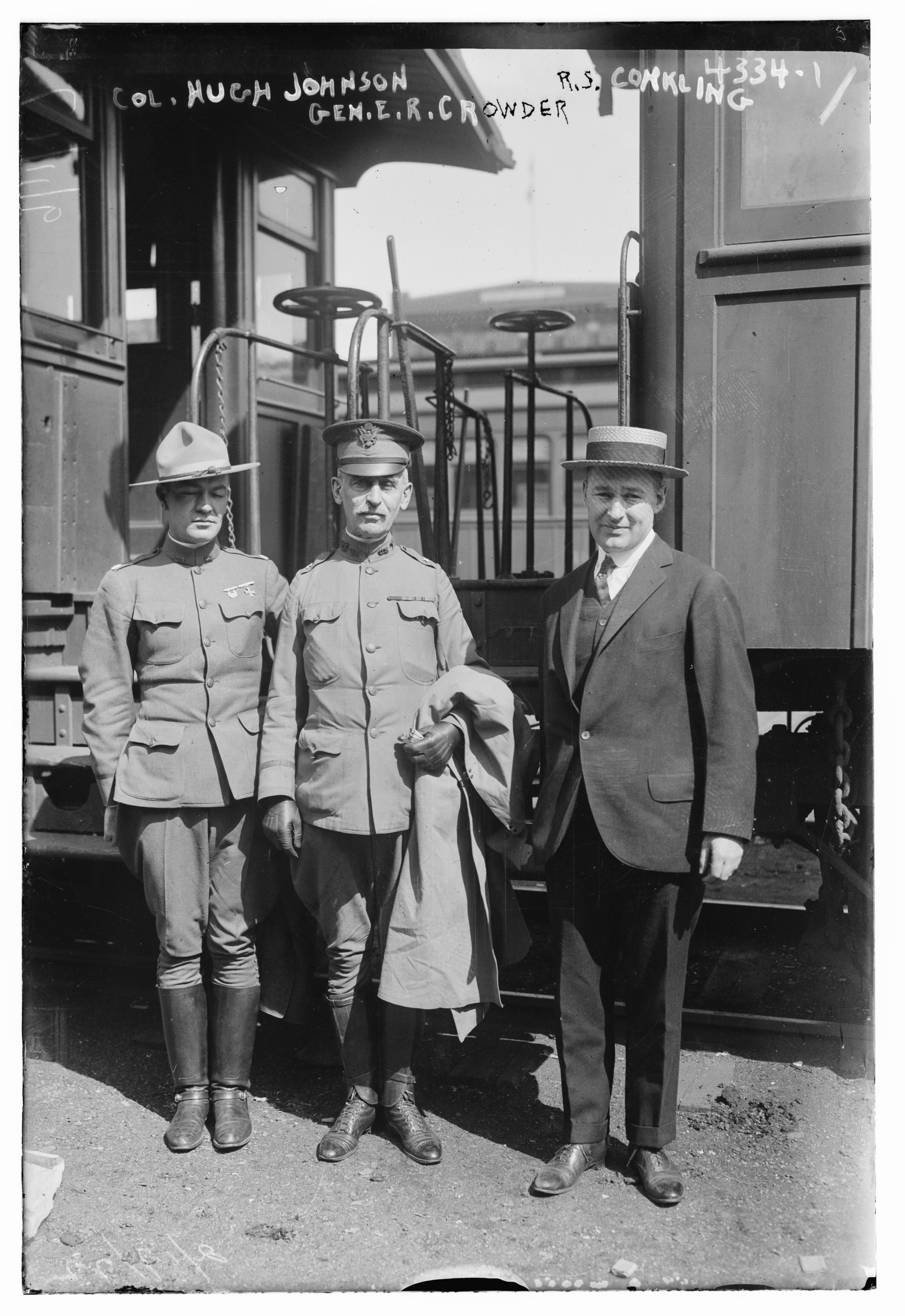
Crowder and Hugh S. Johnson and Roscoe S. Conkling at Camp Upton in 1917.

On April 6, 1917, the United States officially entered World War I. As Provost Marshal of the Army, Crowder led the drafting of the Selective Service Act which was passed by Congress in May 1917. General Crowder, as he became known, was also responsible for directing of the Selective Service and supervised the draft – the registration, classification, and induction – of all American men who were 18–30 years of age into the armed services – over 2,800,000 men during the war.

The officers who served under General Crowder during this period are legion. Among these are the following: Major Hugh S. Johnson, Major Cassius Dowell, Lieutenant Colonel Allen W. Gullion, Major John H. Wigmore, Major Charles B. Warren, Captain M. C. Cramer, and Lieutenant Colonel E. A. Kreger. Although offered a promotion to the rank of lieutenant general in 1918, General Crowder, mindful of public and Congressional opposition to “swivel chair” generals, refused the promotion, seeking instead a field command.

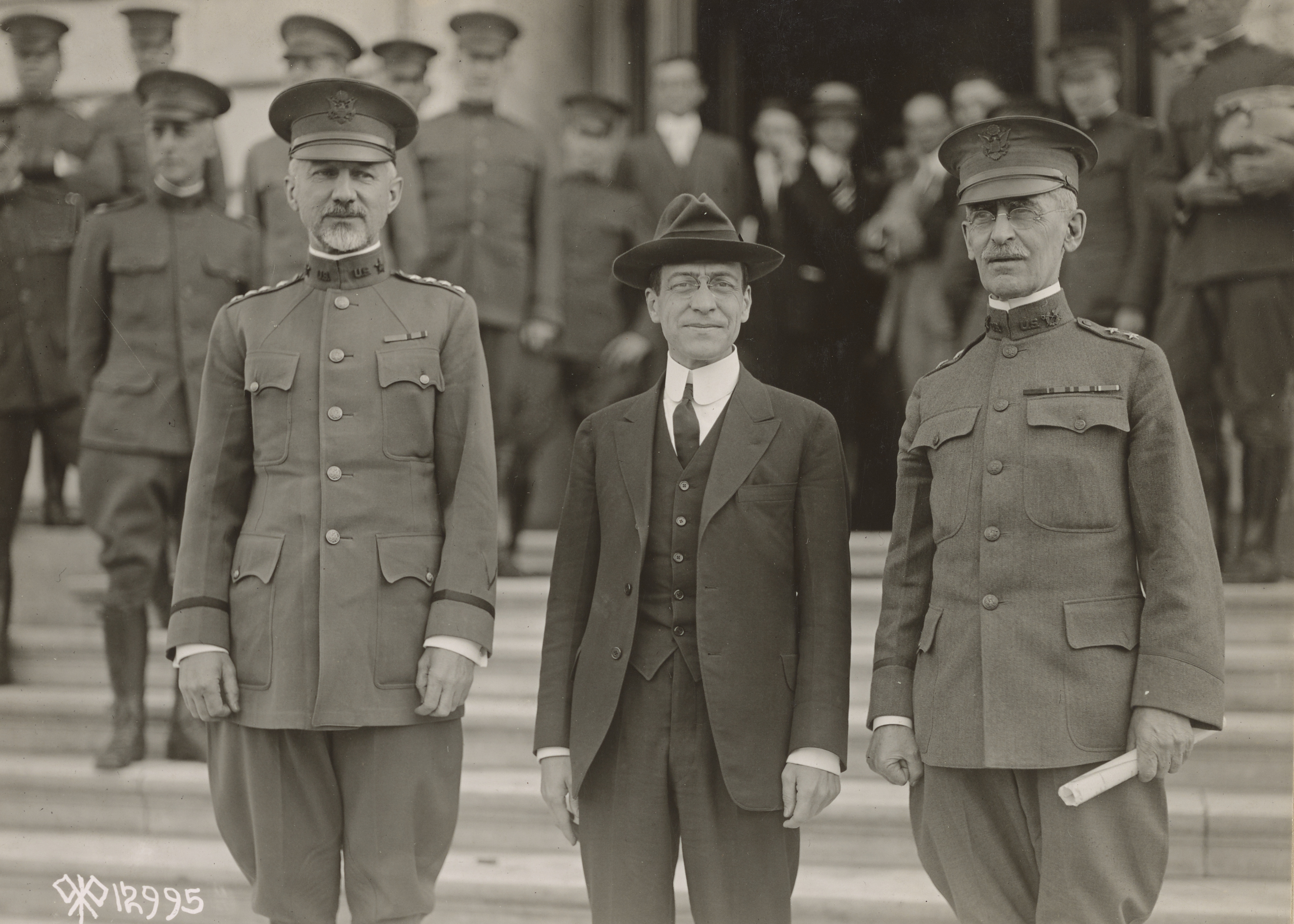
General Peyton C. March, Secretary Newton D. Baker and Major General Enoch Crowder standing outside a Senate building, Washington, D.C., just before starting the drawing of the second draft, June 27, 1918.

In October 1917, Crowder was promoted to major general. As Judge Advocate General, he supervised the administration of military justice in the army during the period when the number of general courts-martial rose from 6,200 in 1917 to over 20,000 in 1918. In 1918, the offices of Secretary of War Newton D. Baker issued the "work or fight" order, and Crowder became in charge of executing the order which mandated that virtually every activity in the country support the war effort. Crowder was also instrumental in ensuring that the United States applied the laws of war to German prisoners of war, and he sought to limit military jurisdiction to uniformed personnel.

On September 26, 1918, in response to newspaper reports of military camps being overcome by the Great Influenza Pandemic, Crowder cancelled the military draft calls for October.

He wrote a book entitled The Spirit of Selective Service.

== Post–World War I ==
After the war, General Crowder found himself, along with the entire military justice system, the center of a storm of controversy, stemming from charges that the military justice system was "un-American." Crowder, a perceptive critic of the system who had already commenced work on needed reform, now accelerated his efforts. The specific recommendations he submitted to Congress, most of which were subsequently adopted, included greater safeguards for the accused, changes in the composition and powers of special courts-martial, and the addition of an authority in the President to reverse or alter any court-martial sentence found to have been adjudged erroneously.

=== Ambassador to Cuba ===
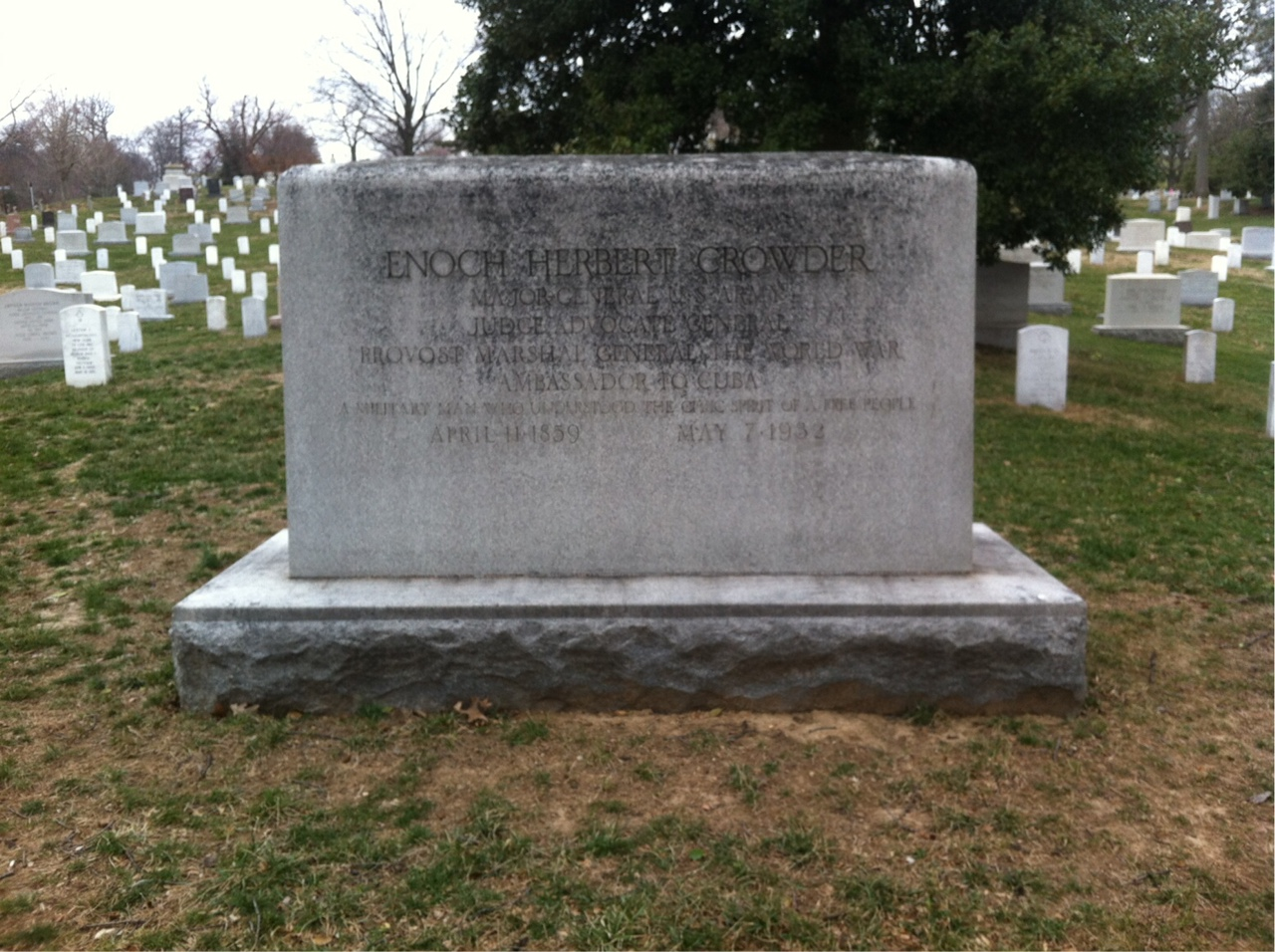
The grave of Major General Enoch Crowder at Arlington National Cemetery.

In the spring of 1919, at the invitation of Cuban President Menocal, Crowder went to Cuba to advise on revisions to the election laws which he had helped write years earlier. He stayed for several years with the U.S. title Special Representative of the President and imposed reforms and appointments on the government of President Alfredo Zayas before a U.S. bank would make a critical loan to the Cuban government. Once the loan was made, Zayas undid those reforms and appointments. Nevertheless, Crowder retired from the army on February 14, 1923, and on the same day was appointed the first Ambassador from the United States to Cuba, a post which he held until 1927.

=== Retirement and death ===
From 1927 until his death in 1932, General Crowder was engaged in the private practice of law in Chicago. Crowder died in Washington, D.C., on May 7, 1932. He was buried at Arlington National Cemetery.

== Awards and honors ==
Among his honors and decorations were the Distinguished Service Medal, the Cuban Order of Carlos Manuel de Cespedes, the Japanese Order of the Rising Sun, Knight Commander of the British Order of St. Michael and St. George, Commander of the Legion of Honor, and Commander of the Italian Order of the Crown. The citation for his Army DSM states the following:

The President of the United States of America, authorized by Act of Congress, July 9, 1918, takes pleasure in presenting the Army Distinguished Service Medal to Major General Enoch Herbert Crowder, United States Army, for exceptionally meritorious and distinguished services to the Government of the United States, in a duty of great responsibility during World War I, as Provost Marshal General in the preparation and operation of the draft laws of the Nation during the war.

== Legacy ==
Perhaps the most apt description of the service to his country by Enoch H. Crowder is contained in the words of the late Henry L. Stimson, Secretary of State in the cabinet of President Herbert Hoover and Secretary of War in the cabinets of Presidents William Howard Taft and Franklin D. Roosevelt, who said of General Crowder:

His record as Judge Advocate General and his later record as Provost Marshal General have constituted a page in the history of our Army upon which we can all look with deep satisfaction and admiration.

His name is memorialized in his home state of Missouri through the naming of a state park in his honor and through the designation of the World War II training center at Neosho, Missouri, as Camp Crowder. The ROTC building at the University of Missouri, Crowder Hall, is also named in his honor. He has been the subject of biographical studies.

== See also ==
- Fort Crowder (a.k.a. Camp Crowder)
- Crowder College (established on the grounds of the fort)
- Crowder State Park

== Bibliography ==
- Coffman, Edward M. (1998). The War to End All Wars: The American Military Experience in World War. University Press of Kentucky. ISBN 978-0-8131-0955-8.
- Davis, Henry Blaine Jr. (1998). Generals in Khaki. Raleigh, North Carolina: Pentland Press. ISBN 1571970886. OCLC 40298151.
- Kastenberg, Joshua E. (2017). To Raise and Discipline an Army: Major General Enoch Crowder, the Judge Advocate General's Office, and the Realignment of Civil and Military Relations in World War I. Northern Illinois University Press. ISBN 978-0875807546.
- Lockmiller, David Alexander (1955). Enoch H. Crowder: Soldier, Lawyer, and Statesman. University of Missouri Press. ISBN 978-0826205384.
- Venzon, Anne Cipriano (2013). The United States in the First World War: an Encyclopedia. Hoboken, NJ: Taylor and Francis. ISBN 978-1-135-68453-2. OCLC 865332376.

Diplomatic posts
Preceded by new office	United States Ambassador to Cuba; 1923–1927	Succeeded by Noble Brandon Judah
