= Provisional Government of Cuba =

1906–1909 U.S. military occupation of Cuba

Provisional Government of Cuba Gobierno Provisional de Cuba (Spanish)
- 1906–1909
- Flag Coat of arms

- Great Seal of the USA

- Status: Military occupation by the United States
- Capital: Havana
- Common languages: Spanish, English
- Provisional Governor
  - 1906: William H. Taft
  - 1906–1909: Charles E. Magoon
- Chief of Staff of the Army of Cuban Pacification
  - 1906–1907: William Wallace Wotherspoon
  - 1907–1909: Millard Filmore Waltz
- Historical era: Modern Era
  - U.S. invasion: 28 September 1906
  - Full withdrawal: 6 February 1909
Preceded by	Succeeded by
Republic of Cuba	Republic of Cuba
- Today part of: Cuba

Second Occupation of Cuba
- Part of the Banana Wars
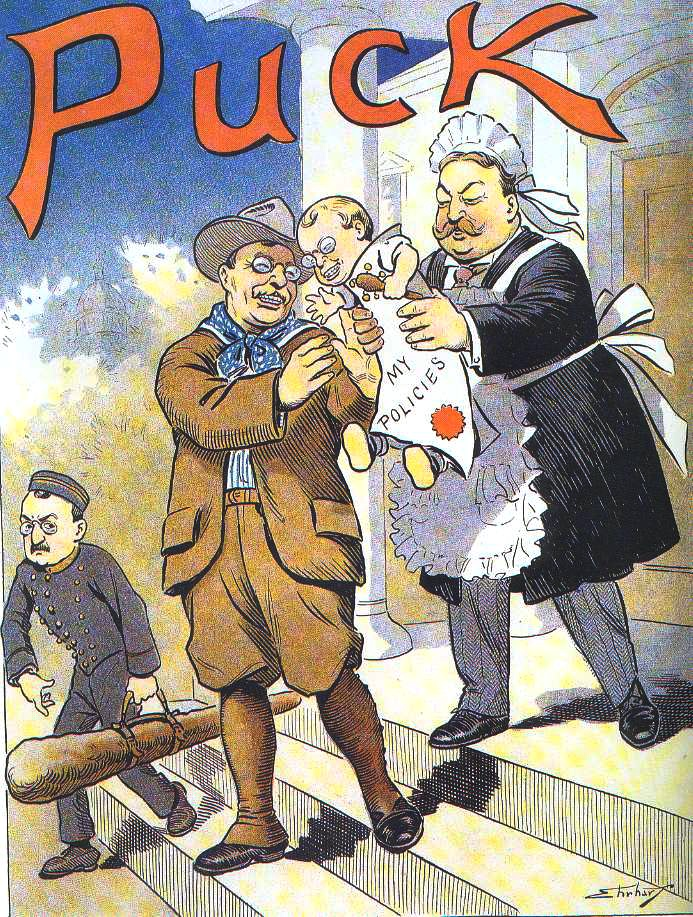
- A 1909 cartoon from Puck showing President Theodore Roosevelt, dressed in his Rough Riders uniform, handing off his policies to the future president, William H. Taft. William Loeb Jr. is at left, holding Roosevelt's "Big Stick."
- Type: Military occupation
- Location: Cuba
- Objective: Protect United States interests, stabilize Cuba, hold free elections
- Date: 1906–1909
- Executed by: United States

The Provisional Government of Cuba (Spanish: Gobierno Provisional de Cuba) lasted from September 1906 to February 1909. This period was also referred to as the Second occupation of Cuba.

When the government of Cuban President Tomás Estrada Palma collapsed, U.S. President Theodore Roosevelt ordered U.S. military forces into Cuba. Their mission was to prevent fighting between the Cubans, to protect U.S. economic interests there, and to hold free elections in order to establish a new and legitimate government. Following the election of José Miguel Gómez in November 1908, U.S. officials judged the situation in Cuba sufficiently stable for the U.S. to withdraw its troops, a process that was completed in February 1909.

An earlier occupation lasted from 1898 to 1902, from the conclusion of peace between the United States and Spain at the end of the Spanish–American War until the inauguration of the Republic of Cuba.

== Background ==
The role of the United States in Cuban affairs, its responsibilities and prerogatives, derived from the Cuban–American Treaty of Relations of 1903, which Cuba and the United States had signed on 22 May of 1903, and ratified in 1904. Article III stated: It contained this provision:

The Government of Cuba consents that the United States may exercise the right to intervene for the preservation of Cuban independence, the maintenance of a government adequate for the protection of life, property, and individual liberty, and for discharging the obligations with respect to Cuba imposed by the Treaty of Paris on the United States, now to be assumed and undertaken by the Government of Cuba.

The conflict between Cuba's political parties began during the presidential election of September 1905, in which Estrada Palma and his party rigged the election to ensure victory over the liberal candidate, José Miguel Gómez. The liberals orchestrated a revolt in August 1906, known as the Little August War. Both sides sought United States military intervention, the government expecting support in suppressing the rebellion and its opponents hoping for new, supervised elections. When Estrada Palma asked for U.S. troops, President Roosevelt was initially reluctant. He sent the Secretary of War William H. Taft and Assistant Secretary of State Robert Bacon to hold discussions in search of a negotiated resolution of the parties' differences. Arriving on 19 September, Taft and Bacon met with the leaders of both parties. When Estrada Palma recognized that Roosevelt was not prepared to support his position, he resigned on 28 September 1906.

== Occupation ==
The day following Palma's resignation, Secretary Taft invoked the terms of the 1903 treaty, established the Provisional Government of Cuba and named himself Provisional Governor of Cuba. The de jure or letter of the law character and scope of the U.S. provisional government was arguably set forth in the proclamation made by then Secretary of War and first provisional governor of Cuba, William H. Taft, which he made immediately upon the establishment U.S. provisional government on 29 September 1906,

“To the People of Cuba:

The failure of [the Cuban] Congress to act on the irrevocable resignation of the President of the Republic of Cuba [Palma] or to elect a successor leaves this country without a government at a time when great disorder prevails, and requires that, pursuant to a request of President Palma, the necessary steps be taken in the name and by the authority of the President of the United States to restore order, protect life and property in the Island of Cuba and islands and keys adjacent thereto, and for this purpose to establish therein a provisional government. The provisional government hereby established by direction and in the name of the President of the United States will be maintained only long enough to restore order and peace and public confidence, and then to hold such elections as may be necessary to determine those persons upon whom the permanent government of the Republic should be devolved. In so far as is consistent with the nature of a provisional government, established under authority of the United States, this will be a Cuban government, conforming, as far as may be, to the constitution of Cuba. The Cuban flag will be hoisted as usual over the Government buildings of the island. All the executive departments and the provincial and municipal governments, including that of the city of Habana, will continue to be administered as under the Cuban Republic. The courts will continue to administer Justice, and all laws not in their nature inapplicable by reason of the temporary and emergent character of the Government will be in force. President Roosevelt has been most anxious to bring about peace under the constitutional government of Cuba and has made every endeavor to avoid the present step. Longer delay, however, would be dangerous. In view of the resignation of the cabinet, until further notice the heads of all departments of the central government will report to me for instructions, including Maj. Gen. Alejandro Rodriguez, in command of the Rural Guard and other regular Government forces, and Gen. Carlos Roloff treasurer of Cuba. Until further notice the civil governors and alcaldes will also report to me for Instructions. I ask all citizens and residents of Cuba to assist in the work of restoring order, tranquility, and public confidence.

William H. Taft Secretary of War of the United States, Provisional Governor of Cuba, Habana, 29 September 1906.”

On 23 October 1906, President Roosevelt issued Executive Order 518, ratifying Taft's actions. U.S. officials ordered the United States Navy to land a brigade of marines. Under the command of Colonel Littleton Waller, they were to protect American citizens and patrol the island until the regular army arrived. The rebels offered no resistance and viewed the American intervention as a sign of success. The U.S. Army General Frederick Funston supervised the surrender of the rebels even before the army arrived. Funston resigned soon after though and was replaced by General James Franklin Bell.

On 6 October, the first army soldiers landed from the transport Sumner. The force was originally called the Army of Cuban Intervention but Taft renamed it on 15 October the Army of Cuban Pacification. The U.S. Congress and Roosevelt authorized the deployment of 18,000 men to Cuba for the expedition but the number in Cuba never exceeded 425 officers and 6,196 enlisted men. About half of the troops were from the 11th Cavalry Regiment under Colonel Earl Thomas and half from the 2nd Regiment, 1st Expeditionary Brigade. In one historian's account, the "Army of Cuban Pacification served as a strong moral presence on the island to encourage stability and obedience to the provisional government." Many of the officers were veterans of the Filipino War and exercised strict discipline to prevent serious incidents of misconduct. Since the rebels had already laid down their arms, the Americans focused on building roads and outposts. A total of 92 kilometers of new roads were constructed during the occupation and the army manned about thirty different posts in both the rural and urban areas, including Guantanamo Bay. Headquarters was at Camp Columbia, west of Havana. The military administration worried about their troops contracting typhoid, malaria and gonorrhea, and ten percent of the soldiers contracted a venereal disease during the occupation.

Most of the troops were stationed in Santa Clara Province, near the population centers and strategically deployed along railways, roads, and other shipping lanes used to transport sugar cane, the principal American-owned business ventures in Cuba. In anticipation of future political unrest and rebellion, the Americans organized a Military Intelligence Division (MID) to gather information about Cuban military capacity and resources available to government opponents. The MID prepared a list of names of all those who had participated in the revolt of 1906 and printed accurate maps of the Cuban topography. They also took detailed photographs for every strategic railroad bridge and waterway. Other troops reorganized and trained the Cuban Rural Guard (Spanish: Guardia Rural Cubana), with an emphasis on improving discipline and morale and ending promotions based on politics. This effort had little impact, because the Cuban government decided to emphasize a reorganized and permanent Cuban army in place of the Rural Guard. Creating a stronger and permanent military force was controversial because it could serve the political interests of the party in power, but its proponents argued that only a permanent fighting force could ensure longterm stability.

On 13 October 1906, Charles Edward Magoon assumed the position of Cuba's provisional governor and he decided that the country was stable enough to hold elections. Regional elections took place on 25 May 1908, and the presidential election on 14 November, both supervised by the U.S. military. The elections took place without incident and José Miguel Gómez was elected. He took office on 28 January 1909. The U.S. troops were withdrawn over the following weeks, with the last American forces leaving the island country on 6 February 1909.

Assessing the operation, President Roosevelt praised its efficiency ("the swiftest mobilization and dispatch of troops over sea ever accomplished by our Government") and said it confirmed his support for organizing U.S. forces under the General Staff in the Army and the General Board in the Navy.

=== Baseball ===
During the occupation, the Afro-Cuban pitcher José de la Caridad Méndez faced the visiting Cincinnati Reds in December 1908. In a three-game exhibition series, he pitched 25 consecutive scoreless innings, including a five-hit shutout in the last game.

== See also ==
- The Sugar Intervention, a third occupation
- Army of Cuban Pacification Medal
