= Fawzia =

Fawzia, Faouzia, Fawziya, Fouzieh, or Fouzia (Arabic: فوزية) is a feminine given name of Arabic origin meaning victorious. Notable people with the name include:

== Given name ==
=== Faouzia ===
- Faouzia (born 2000), Moroccan-Canadian singer-songwriter and musician
- Faouzia Aloui (born 1957), Tunisian poet and writer
- Faouzia Charfi (born 1941), Tunisian scientist, intellectual, and politician
- Faouzia Mebarki (born 1959), Algerian diplomat

=== Fawzia ===
- Princess Fawzia of Egypt (disambiguation), various members of Egyptian royalty
- Fawzia Al-Abbasi (1940–2021), Egyptian journalist and television pioneer
- Fawzia Yusuf Adam, Somali politician
- Fawzia Afzal-Khan (born 1958), Pakistani-American academic
- Fawzia Arshad, Pakistani politician
- Fawzia Al-Ashmawi (died 2022), Egyptian academic, writer, and translator
- Fawzia Assaad (1929–2023), Egyptian novelist
- Fawzia Fahim (born 1931), Egyptian biochemist and environmental biologist
- Fawzia Karim Firoze, Bangladeshi lawyer
- Fawzia Gilani-Williams, British scholar of Islamic children's literature
- Fawzia Saeed Hai (1942–1968), Pakistani model
- Fawzia Koofi (born 1975), Afghan politician and women's rights activist
- Fawzia Mirza, Pakistani-American actress
- Fawzia al-Otaibi, Saudi women's rights activist
- Fawzia Peer, South African politician
- Fawzia Rhoda, South African politician
- Fawzia Amin Sido, a Yazidi woman who lived in Palestine until October 2024
- Fawzia Zainal (born 1961), Bahraini politician
- Fawzia Zouari (born 1955), Tunisian writer and journalist

=== Fawziya ===
- Fawziya Abdoulkarim (born 1989), Cameroonian volleyball player
- Fawziyya Abu Khalid (born 1955), Saudi poet, essayist, sociologist, and professor
- Fawziya Mahran (1931–2019), Egyptian writer and critic
- Fawziya Abikar Nur, Somali politician
- Fawziya Rashid (born 1954), Bahraini novelist
- Fawziyya al-Sindi (born 1957), Bahraini poet and activist

=== Fouzia ===
- Fouzia Assouli, Moroccan human rights activist
- Fouzia El Bayed, Moroccan women's rights advocate and politician
- Fouzia Habib (died 2026), Pakistani politician
- Fouzia Hameed, Pakistani politician
- Fouzia El Kassioui (born 1992), Moroccan Paralympic athlete
- Fouzia Khan (born 1957), Indian politician
- Fouzia Ejaz Khan, Pakistani politician
- Fouzia Rhissassi (born 1947), Moroccan professor of social sciences
- Fouzia Saeed (born 1959), Pakistani social activist

=== Fouzieh ===
- Fouzieh Majd, Iranian composer and ethnomusicologist

== See also ==
- Fawzi
