= List of political parties in Cuba =

This article lists political parties in Cuba. Cuba is a single-party authoritarian regime, led by the Communist Party of Cuba, where political opposition is not permitted. No party is allowed to campaign or endorse candidates for election, including the Communist Party. Candidates for National Assembly of People's Power elections are nominated by organizations that are firmly controlled by the Party. Candidates are elected on an individual referendum basis without formal party involvement, though elected assemblies predominantly consist of members of the dominant party alongside non-affiliated candidates. Elections in Cuba are neither free, nor democratic. As a result, political rallies by opposition parties occur only sporadically on the island.

Cuban law also stipulates that it is punishable to receive funds from a foreign government for purposes of a political organization.

== Current political parties ==
=== Official parties ===
Party	Abbr.	Founded	Ideology	Political position	Leader	National Assembly
Communist Party of Cuba; Partido Comunista de Cuba	PCC	1965	Communism; Marxism–Leninism	Far-left	Miguel Díaz-Canel	442 / 470

=== Unofficial parties ===
Party	Abbr.	Founded	Ideology	Political position	Leader	National Assembly
Christian Democratic Party of Cuba; Partido Demócrata Cristiano de Cuba	PDC	1959	Christian democracy; Christian humanism	Centre	Elena Larrinaga	0 / 470
Christian Liberation Movement; Movimiento Cristiano Liberación	MCL	1988	Christian democracy; Anti-communism	Centre-right	Eduardo Cardet	0 / 470
Democratic Social-Revolutionary Party of Cuba; Partido Social-Revolucionario Democrático de Cuba	PSRDC	1992	Democratic socialism	Left-wing	Jorge Valls	0 / 470

- Cuban Libertarian Party – José Martí (Partido Libertario Cubano - José Martí)
- Cuban Democratic Socialist Current (Corriente Socialista Democratica Cubana)
- Cuban Liberal Solidarity Party - An amalgamation of the National Liberal Party and the Democratic Solidarity Party
- Cuban Liberal Union (Unión Liberal Cubana, member LI)
- Orthodox Renovation Party (Partido de la Renovación Ortodoxa)
- Social Democratic Co-ordination of Cuba (Coordinadora Social Demócrata de Cuba)

== Historical parties ==
Party	Abbr.	Ideology	Political position	Leader	Years active
Cuban Revolutionary Party; Partido Revolucionario Cubano	PRC	Liberalism; Radicalism; Cuban nationalism; Anti-imperialism	Centre	José Martí; Tomás Estrada Palma	1892–1898
Cuban Revolutionary Party – Authentic; Partido Revolucionario Cubano – Auténtico	PRC-A	Cuban nationalism; Left-wing nationalism; Economic nationalism; Liberal nationalism; Corporatism; Left-wing populism; Social democracy	Centre-left to left-wing	Ramón Grau (1934–1948); Carlos Prío Socarrás (1948–1959)	1934–1959
Democratic Solidarity Party; Partido Solidaridad Democrática	PSD	Liberalism; Human rights; Anti-communism	Centre to centre-right	Fernando Sánchez López	1992–2014
Liberal Party of Cuba; Partido Liberal de Cuba	PLC	Autonomism; Classical liberalism	Centre to centre-right	José Miguel Gómez; Gerardo Machado	1878–1959
National Liberal Party of Cuba; Partido Liberal Nacional de Cuba	PLNC	National liberalism; Anti-communism	Centre-right		2004–2014
Party of the Cuban People – Orthodox; Partido del Pueblo Cubano – Ortodoxos	PPC-O	Left-wing populism; Direct democracy; Anti-corruption; Progressivism; Anti-imperialism; Agrarian reform; Free market economics; Social corporatism; Reformism; Socialism; Factions: Democratic socialism; Classical liberalism	Centre-left to left-wing	Eduardo Chibás; Emilio Ochoa	1947–1952
Popular Socialist Party; Partido Socialista Popular	PSP	Communism; Marxism–Leninism	Far-left	Blas Roca Calderio	1925–1961
Progressive Action Party; Partido de Acción Progresista	PAP	Authoritarianism; Conservatism; Economic liberalism; Liberalism; Anti-communism; Right-wing populism; Militarism; Pro-foreign investment; Pro-free markets (in practice); Keynesianism (in practice); Structuralist economics (in practice)	Right-wing	Fulgencio Batista	1949–1959
United Party of the Socialist Revolution of Cuba; Partido Unido de la Revolución Socialista de Cuba	PURSC	Communism; Marxism–Leninism; Revolutionary socialism; Fidelismo; Guevarism	Far-left	Fidel Castro	1962–1965

- Constitutional Union Party
- Cuban National League
- Cuban National Party
- Cuban Popular Party
- Cuban Socialist Party
- Democratic Federal Republican Party of Santiago de Cuba
- Democratic Party
- Democratic Union Party
- Federal Republican Party of Las Villas
- Independent Colored Party
- Independent Republican Party
- National Conservative Party
- People's Labour Party
- People's Party
- Republican Party of Havana
- Saguan Democratic Party
- Socialist Party of the Island of Cuba
- Socialist Party of Manzanillo
- Socialist Workers Party

== See also ==
- List of ruling political parties by country
- Liberalism in Cuba
- Cuban dissident movement
