= Fevzi =

Fevzi is the Turkish form of the Arabic name Fawzi (فوزيّ) meaning "triumph". Notable people with the name include:

- Fevzi Aksoy (1930–2020), Turkish physician
- Fevzi Çakmak (1876–1950), Turkish field marshal
- Fevzi Davletov (born 1972), Uzbekistani football player
- Fevzi Elmas (born 1983), Turkish football player
- Fevzi Lütfi Karaosmanoğlu (1900–1978), Turkish politician and journalist
- Fevzi Mostari (c. 1675–1747), Bosnian writer
- Fevzi Pasha (disambiguation), multiple people
- Fevzi Pakel (born 1936), Turkish athlete
- Fevzi Şeker (1962–2011), Turkish wrestler
- Fevzi Tuncay (born 1977), Turkish football player
- Fevzi Türkeri (born 1941), Turkish general
- Fevzi Zemzem (1941–2022), Turkish football player
