= People's Party (Cuba) =

Former political party in Cuba (1900-1902)

People's Party Partido Popular
- Founded: 1900
- Dissolved: 1902
- Headquarters: Havana, Cuba
- Ideology: Socialism

The People's Party (Spanish: Partido Popular) was a short-lived political party in Cuba. It was founded on November 7, 1900, by Diego Vicente Tejera (who had formed the Cuban Socialist Party the preceding year). The People's Party sought to mobilize the working class of Cuba into political action. However the party failed to make any significant political breakthrough. Tejera took part in the Constituent Convention of 1901 as a delegate from the People's Party.

The government barred the party from contesting the 1901 elections by issuing a demand that it produce a register showing that it had 5,000 members in each of Cuba's major cities and 500 in several smaller towns. The demand was issued just two hours before the closure of the registration offices for the elections. Needless to say, the party failed to produce such a register in such a short time-span and could not contest. Tejera denounced the action of the government as electoral fraud in an article in La Discusión on June 18, 1901.

Tejera died on November 5, 1903. The two short-lived parties he had launched, the Cuban Socialist Party and the People's Party, were the first attempts to build working class parties in Cuba. In August 1901, a People's Labour Party appeared as a continuation of the People's Party. Seemingly, Tejera had no links to this party as his signature did not figure amongst the signatures of the party program released on August 9, 1901. Tejera's efforts were later continued by the formation of the Socialist Propaganda Club, the Socialist Workers Party and the Socialist Party of Manzanillo.
