= Prize For Freedom =

- Type: annual international award
- Awarded for: defence of freedom and human rights
- Description: The Prize for Freedom is awarded annually by Liberal International to honour an individual who has made an exceptional contribution to the advancement of human rights and political freedoms. Recipients come from across the world and have fought on issues from women’s empowerment to establishing democracy.
- Country: United Kingdom
- Presented by: Liberal International
- Eligibility: 1. Nominees must be individuals who champion liberal values, including freedom of conscience, human rights, democracy, the rule of law, and peace 2. individuals who are key contributors to significant changes in a country or region 3. individuals to whom this award might offer protection from extreme forms of political persecution
- Motto: To be given to a well-known personality of liberal conviction who has made outstanding efforts for the defence of freedom and human rights
- Status: Active
- Established: 1984

Highlights
- Total: 41
- Total recipients: 41
- Website: Prize For Freedom

The Prize For Freedom is an annual prize presented by the Liberal International to individuals who had made exceptional contributions to human rights and political freedoms.

== Background ==
Established in 1984 with the agreement of Liberal International Executive Committee. With the prize the organization honors an individual which has made an exceptional contribution to human rights and political freedoms. The Prize is one of the highest awards focused on the people who would persevere and promote world liberality.

== Awards ==
Year	Awardee	Country
1984	Raúl Alfonsín	Argentina
1985	Sheena Duncan	South Africa
1986	Corazon Aquino	Philippines
1987	Hans-Dietrich Genscher	West Germany
1988	Benazir Bhutto	Pakistan
1989	Václav Havel	Czechoslovakia
1990	Gitobu Imanyara	Kenya
1991	Domingo Laino	Paraguay
1992	María Elena Cruz Varela	Cuba
1993	Mary Robinson	Ireland
1994	Sadako Ogata	Japan
1995	Aung San Suu Kyi	Myanmar
1996	Martin Lee	Hong Kong
1997	Olusegun Obasanjo	Nigeria
1998	Khalida Messaoudi	Algeria
1999	Lennart Meri	Estonia
2000	Asma Jahangir	Pakistan
2001	Chen Shuibian	Taiwan
2002	Helen Suzman	South Africa
2003	Abdoulaye Wade	Senegal
2004	Grigory Yavlinsky	Russia
2005	Antonino Zichichi	Italy
2006	Sam Rainsy	Cambodia
2007	Alaksandar Milinkievič	Belarus
2008	Padraig O'Malley	United States
2009	Eric Lubbock	United Kingdom
2010	Shirin Ebadi	Iran
2011	Chee Soon Juan	Singapore
2012	Colin Eglin	South Africa
2013	Dick Marty	Switzerland
2014	Waris Dirie	Somalia
2015	John Alderdice	United Kingdom
2016	Raif Badawi	Saudi Arabia
2017	Ilham Tohti	China
2018	Leila de Lima	Philippines
2019	María Corina Machado	Venezuela
2020	Zeid bin Ra'ad	Jordan
2021	Sima Samar	Afghanistan
2022	Volodymyr Zelenskyy	Ukraine
2023	Vladimir Kara-Murza	Russia
2024	Victoire Ingabire Umuhoza	Rwanda
2025	Osman Kavala	Turkey
2026	Jimmy Lai	Hong Kong

== See also ==
- Oxford Manifesto

== Sources ==
- Prize for Freedom
- Aliaksandr Milinkevich
