= Rangoni =

Rangoni is a surname. Notable people with the surname include:

- Beatrice Rangoni Machiavelli (born 1936), Italian politician, author, and activist
- Luca Rangoni (born 1968), Italian auto racing driver
- Ercole Rangoni (died 1527), Italian Catholic Cardinal
