= International Network of Liberal Women =

- Formation: 1990; 36 years ago
- Type: Non-governmental organization
- Location: Wassenaar, Netherlands
- Website: inlw.org

The International Network of Liberal Women (INLW) is an association of women from around the world who support liberal values, which they define as "Individual freedom, human rights, the rule of law, tolerance, equality of opportunity, social justice, free trade and market economy." It is a member of Liberal International.

INLW's aims include empowering women and expanding their participation in politics. INLW sends consultants to conferences such as the United Nations Commission on the Status of Women, the Council of Asian Liberals and Democrats, and the Istanbul Convention to provide expertise on issues such as discrimination and violence against women. Chapters include the Netherlands, Morocco, West Africa, and Asia-Pacific.

== History ==
INLW was founded in 1990 at the Congress of Liberal International (LI) in Helsinki by a group of women representing Belgium, Canada, Finland, France, Germany, Israel, Italy, Netherlands, Sweden, Switzerland and the United Kingdom. Barbro Westerholm, a member of the Swedish parliament, was the group's first Coordinator.

== Leadership ==
At the General Meeting in Dakar, Senegal, on November 28, 2018, the following leaders were elected: Jayanthi Devi Balaguru of Malaysia, President; Khadija El Morabit of Morocco, Deputy President; Lysbeth van Valkenburg, Treasurer; and several regional vice presidents including Sal Brinton (Europe), Maysing Yang (Asia), Loubna Amhair (MENA), Awa Gueye Kebe (Africa), and Patricia Olamendi (Latin America). Leticia Gutíerrez and Ruth Richardson were appointed to the board. The group also created a Consultative Committee with members from Spain, the Netherlands, South Africa, and the Ivory Coast.

INLW patrons include Annemie Neyts-Uyttebroeck, former president of Liberation International; Beatrice Rangoni Machiavelli of the Italian Liberal Party; Lorna Marsden, Canadian politician and academic; Annette Lu, former vice president of Taiwan; Kandia Camara, Minister of Education for the Ivory Coast; and Hakima El Haité, former INLW vice president and environmental minister of Morocco.

== See also ==
- Yabloko, Russian women's rights organization and INLW member
- Fouzia El Bayed, Moroccan politician and first president of the Moroccan chapter of INLW
