= Mebarki =

Mebarki is a surname. Notable people with the surname include:

- Billel Mebarki, Algerian retired footballer
- Faouzia Mebarki, Algerian ambassador to Austria and Slovakia
- Meriem Mebarki, Algerian fencer
- Ryma Mebarki, Algerian volleyball player
