= Fawzi =

Fawzi, Faouzi, Fawzy or Fevzi (in Arabic فوزي) is an Arabic name and surname meaning "triumph". Notable people with the name include:

== Given name ==
=== Fawzi ===
- Fawzi Al Shammari (born 1979), Kuwaiti athlete who competes in the 200 and 400 metres
- Fawzi al-Ghazzi (1891–1929), Syrian politician known for being the father of the Syrian constitution
- Fawzi al-Mulki (1910–1962), Jordanian diplomat and politician
- Fawzi al-Qawuqji (1890–1977), the field commander of the Arab Liberation Army during the 1948 Arab-Israeli War
- Fawzi Allymun, Mauritian politician
- Fawzi Bashir Doorbeen (born 1984), Omani football midfielder
- Fawzi Fayez (born 1987), Emirati footballer
- Fawzi Hariri (born 1958), Iraqi politician
- Fawzi Husseini (died 1946) was a Palestinian Arab political figure notable for leadership of the New Palestine Society (Filastin al-Jadida) and his interest in the political program of binationalism in Palestine during the Mandate period.
- Fawzi Moussouni (born 1972), Algerian international football player
- Fawzi Salloukh (born 1931), Lebanese politician
- Fawzi Selu (1905–1972), Syrian military leader, politician and head of state

=== Faouzi ===
- Faouzi Aaish (born 1985), Bahraini footballer
- Faouzi Abdelghani (born 1985), Moroccan footballer
- Faouzi Bensaïdi (born 1967), Moroccan film director, actor, screenwriter and artist
- Faouzi Benzarti (born 1950), Tunisian footballer and coach
- Faouzi Chaouchi (born 1984), Algerian footballer
- Faouzi Ghoulam (born 1991), Algerian footballer
- Faouzi Khidr (1950–2025), Egyptian teacher, journalist, writer, and manuscript specialist
- Faouzi Kojmane (born 1992), French rapper of Moroccan origin known as Zifou
- Faouzi Lahbi (born 1960), Moroccan middle-distance runner
- Faouzi Mansouri (1956–2022), Algerian footballer
- Faouzi Rzig (born 1982), Tunisian Paralympian athlete
- Faouzi Yaya (born 1989), Algerian footballer

== Surname ==
=== Fawzi ===
- Hussam Fawzi (born 1974), Iraqi footballer, former captain of the Iraq national football team
- Mahmoud Fawzi (1900–1981), Egyptian diplomat and political figure
- Mohamed Fawzi (singer) (1918–1966), Egyptian composer and singer
- Mohamed Fawzi (general) (1915–2000), Egyptian general
- Mohamed Fawzi (footballer) (born 1990), Emirati football player

=== Faouzi ===
- Mohammed Faouzi (born 1987), Dutch footballer
- Soufiane El-Faouzi (born 2002), German footballer

=== Fawzy ===
- Khaled Fawzy (born 1957), Egyptian intelligence official
- Mahmoud Fawzy (born 1992), Egyptian wrestler
- Mofeed Fawzy (1933–2022), Egyptian television presenter
- Samy Fawzy (born 1963), Egyptian Anglican bishop
- Sherif Fawzy (born 1990), Egyptian footballer

== See also ==
- Fawzia
