= Liberalism in Cuba =

This article gives an overview of liberalism in Cuba. It is limited to liberal parties with substantial support, mainly proved by having had a representation in parliament. The sign ⇒ means a reference to another party in that scheme. For inclusion in this scheme it isn't necessary so that parties labeled themselves as a liberal party.

== Introduction ==
From the founding of the Republic in 1902 to the Cuban Revolution of 1933, the Cuban Liberal Party held the presidency on numerous occasions.

Since the triumph of the Cuban Revolution of 1959, there have been three liberal parties in existence. Those parties are: the Liberal Democratic Party (Partido Liberal Democrático, observer LI), the Democratic Solidarity Party (Partido Solidaridad Democrática, observer LI) and the illegal Cuban Liberal Movement (Movimiento Liberal Cubano). In exile the Cuban Liberal Union (Unión Liberal Cubana, member LI) is active.

== The timeline ==
=== Cuban Revolutionary Party (PRC) ===
- 1892: Left-wing classical liberals formed the Cuban Revolutionary Party (Partido Revolucionario Cubano), to fight for Cuban independence and liberal democracy.
- 1902: The PRC is dissolved.

=== Liberal Party ===
- 1902: The Liberal Party of Cuba was founded by many of those who had formerly been members of the PRC.
- 1908: The Independent Colored Party is formed, fighting for agrarian reform, democratic nationalism, and the civil rights of Black Cubans.
- 1925: The Liberal Party wins the elections with Gerardo Machado as their candidate.
- 1929: Machado runs for a second term by altering the Constitution, and is fraudulently elected. The Liberal Party splits between "machadistas" and those against Machado.
- 1933: The Revolution takes place, in which a group of students, the FEU, led by Ramón Grau San Martín, a Professor of Physiology at the University of Havana, seek to overthrow Machado, and later, the US backed provisional government of Carlos Manuel de Cespedes. Allying themselves with a group of soldiers led by Fulgencio Batista, the provisional government is overthrown and Grau is made President.

=== The Second Cuban Revolutionary Party (PRC), the Party of the Cuban People (PPC) and the Liberal Party ===
- 1934: After Grau's removal from the presidency by Batista, a group of former students, Grau, and several former members of the Liberal Party form the new Authentic Cuban Revolutionary Party, or PRC (Partido Revolucionario Cubano- Autentico) to fight for their beliefs. The PRC begins to compete with the traditional Liberal Party, which was stained by its support of Machado.
- 1940: Fulgencio Batista is elected President of Cuba with the support of the Liberal Party. The new Constitution is promulgated later that year, with Carlos Márquez Sterling as President of the Convention.
- 1944: Ramón Grau San Martín is elected President of Cuba, with the support of several former Liberal Party members, as the PRC wins its first elections.
- 1947: Eduardo Chibas breaks off from the PRC to protest the corruption of the Grau government and forms the Partido del Pueblo Cubano-Ortodoxo (PPC) or the Party of Cuban People-Orthodox. Several former PRC and Liberal Party members, including Márquez Sterling, join.
- 1948: Carlos Prío Socarrás of the PRC is elected President of Cuba.
- 1951: Eduardo Chibas dies from an accidental suicide. Had he survived, the PPC would most likely not have fragmented as it did during the 1950s.

=== Batista's coup and second government ===
- 1952: The Liberal Party of Cuba supports Batista's coup of 1952 and joins the provisional government, and later Batista's second government. By now the Liberal Party is a shell of its former self, controlled by Batista.
- 1952–1958: The PRC and PPC split between those who argue for revolution and support Castro, and those who seek compromise with Batista and support free and fair general elections.
- 1958: The General Elections of 1958 fail, as Batista rigs the elections to ensure the victory of the government candidate Andrés Rivero Agüero and a member of the Liberal Party, against Carlos Márquez Sterling running for the Partido del Pueblo Libre.
- 1959: Castro takes power and outlaws all political parties except the Communist Party. The traditional Liberal Party, PRC, and PPC legally cease to exist. The Liberal Party continues underground and extralegally.

== Liberal leaders ==
- José Martí, founder of the PRC and leading Cuban intellectual
- Martín Morúa Delgado, Afro-Cuban and President of the Cuban Senate
- Juan Gualberto Gómez, Afro-Cuban revolutionary leader, close collaborator of Martí's, served as part of the committee of consultations that drafted and amended the Constitution of 1901, and as a Representative and Senator
- José Miguel Gómez, the first member of the Liberal Party elected to the presidency of Cuba
- Gerardo Machado, a president of Cuba elected under the Liberal Party
- Orestes Ferrara, a professor at the University of Havana, Cuban Secretary of State and delegate to the Constitutional Convention
- Carlos Márquez Sterling, a leading member of the Liberal Party during the 1930s and 1940s and President of the Constitutional Convention in 1940. He later served in the first government of Fulgencio Batista.

== See also ==
- History of Cuba
- Politics of Cuba
- List of political parties in Cuba
