= Deborah Digges =

American poet

- Born: Deborah Sugarbaker; February 6, 1950; Jefferson City, Missouri, US
- Died: April 10, 2009 (aged 59); Amherst, Massachusetts, US
- Education: University of California, Riverside, B.A.; University of Missouri, M.A.; Iowa Writers' Workshop, M.F.A.
- Occupations: Writer; poet; teacher
- Writing career
- Notable works: Vesper Sparrows (1986); Rough Music (1995)
- Notable awards: Ingram-Merrill Award (1985); National Endowment for the Arts grant (1987); Delmore Schwartz Memorial Award (1987); Guggenheim Fellowship, (1988); Kingsley Tufts Poetry Award (1996)

Deborah Digges (February 6, 1950 – April 10, 2009) was an American poet and teacher.

Digges was an academic who taught in the writing and English faculties of the New York University, the Boston University, the Columbia University, and the Tufts University. She published four volumes of poetry, two volumes of memoirs, and her translation of the poems of María Elena Cruz Varela. She committed suicide by jumping from the top of the bleachers of the Warren McGuirk Alumni Stadium.

== Biography ==
She was born Deborah Leah Sugarbaker in Jefferson City, Missouri, on February 6, 1950. Her father was a physician and her mother was a nurse; she was the sixth child in a family of ten children.

Digges received a Bachelor of Arts degree from the University of California, Riverside in 1976, a Master's from the University of Missouri in 1982, and her Master of Fine Arts in Poetry from the Iowa Writers Workshop in 1984. In the course of her academic career, she taught in the writing and English faculties of New York University, Boston University, Columbia University, and Tufts University.

She authored four books of poetry and two memoirs. Her first book of poems, Vesper Sparrows, won the Delmore Schwartz Memorial Prize for Poetry. In 1997 Digges was awarded the Kingsley Tufts Poetry Award, the largest prize for a single work of poetry, for her book Rough Music. She was also the winner of two Pushcart Prizes. Digges translated the poems of the Cuban poet María Elena Cruz Varela. A book of poetry, The Wind Blows Through the Doors of My Heart: Poems, was published by Knopf in 2010.

== Suicide ==
Digges died April 10, 2009, in Amherst, Massachusetts. Her death was reported as a suicide following her fatal fall from the top of the bleachers of Warren McGuirk Alumni Stadium at the University of Massachusetts Amherst.

== Bibliography ==
Poetry

- Vesper Sparrows (Atheneum Publishers, 1986)
- Late In The Millennium (Knopf, 1989)
- Rough Music (Random House, 1997)
- Trapeze (Knopf, 2004)
- The Wind Blows Through the Doors of My Heart: Poems (Knopf, 2010, posthumous)

Memoirs

- Fugitive Spring (Knopf, 1992)
- The Stardust Lounge: Stories from a Boy's Adolescence (Anchor Books, 2001).

Translation

- Ballad of the Blood/Balada De La Sangre: The Poems of Maria Elena Cruz (Ecco Press, 1997)

== Honors and grants ==
- Delmore Schwartz Memorial Prize
- Kingsley Tufts Poetry Award
- Ingram Merrill Foundation grant
- National Endowment for the Arts grant
- John Simon Guggenheim Foundation grant
