= National Liberal Party of Cuba =

Political party of Cuba from 2004 to 2014

National Liberal Party of Cuba Partido Liberal Nacional de Cuba
- Founded: 2004
- Dissolved: 20 February 2014
- Merged into: Cuban Liberal Solidarity Party
- Headquarters: Havana
- Ideology: National liberalism Anti-communism
- Political position: Centre-right
- International affiliation: Liberal International

The National Liberal Party of Cuba (Spanish: Partido Liberal Nacional de Cuba, PLNC) was a political party of Cuba, founded in 2004 and dissolved in 2014.

== History ==
The party was founded under the name Cuban Liberal Movement (Spanish: Movimiento Liberal Cubano) in 2004. It changed its name to PLNC in 2007. Party members were often intimidated, arrested, or imprisoned by political police.

On February 20, 2014, it merged with the Democratic Solidarity Party, adopting the name Cuban Liberal Solidarity Party (Spanish: Partido Solidaridad Liberal Cubano, PSLC).

== Ideology ==
The National Liberal Party of Cuba was a party of liberal ideology, since it defended postulates like nonintervention of the state and absolute economic freedom. The PLNC struggled to end Cuba's socialist system and respect for human rights. It was open to engaging in a dialogue with all pro-democratic forces in Cuba, especially those of liberal descent.

== See also ==
- List of political parties in Cuba
- Liberalism
- Contributions to liberal theory
- Liberalism by country
- Liberal democracy
- Liberalism in Cuba
