= Democratic Solidarity Party =

Democratic Solidarity Party Partido Solidaridad Democrática
- Leader: Fernando Sánchez López
- Founded: 1992
- Dissolved: 20 February 2014
- Merged into: Cuban Liberal Solidarity Party
- Ideology: Liberalism; Human rights Anti-communism
- Political position: Centre to centre-right
- International affiliation: Liberal International

The Democratic Solidarity Party (Partido Solidaridad Democrática) was a political liberal party in Cuba. Although changes to the Cuban constitution in 1992 decriminalized the right to form political parties other than the Communist Party of Cuba, these parties are not permitted to campaign or engage in any public political activities on the island. The Democratic Solidarity party described itself as "an organization from within Cuba promoting democracy and the respect for human rights by the peaceful route." The last President of the party was Fernando Sánchez López. The party was a full member of Liberal International.

It merged with the National Liberal Party of Cuba in February 2014 to form the Cuban Liberal Solidarity Party (Spanish: Partido Solidaridad Liberal Cubano, PSLC).

== Membership ==
In February 2007 the following persons were elected to the national executive committee of PSD:

1. Fernando Sánchez López, President.
2. Antonio Torres Justo, Vice president pro tempore and executive secretary
3. Carlos Aitcheson Guzmán, international relations pro tempore
4. Marcos Fiallo Samper, Finances
5. Ignacio Padrón Navarro, Organizer
6. Osmar Laffita, public relacions and spokesperson
7. Orestes Cartaya Lirio, youth issues
8. Juan de Dios Duke, human rights and attention to political prisoners
9. Raúl Chávez Valdivia, Representative of the oriental provinces Granma, Santiago de Cuba, Guantánamo.
10. Wilber Hernández Acosta, epresentantive of the oriental provinces Ciego de Avila, Camagüey, Las Tunas, Holguín
11. Rolando Delgado, epresentantive of the occidental provinces
12. Jorge Verrier Rodríguez, epresentantive of the central provinces
13. Rafael Arias Carmona, workers and farmers issues
14. Adolfo Fernández Sainz, international relations, imprisoned in the Black Spring of 2003
15. Margarita Cienfuegos, women's secretary

Provincial delegates

1. Rolando Delgado Ramos, Pinar del Río
2. Ignacio Padrón Navarro, Havana province
3. Hermes Diago Gómez, Matanzas
4. Ricardo Filgueira Fajardo, Cienfuegos
5. Juan de Dios Ortueta, Villa Clara
6. Rubén Mulén Torno, S.Spíritus
7. Israel Savigñon Revé, Camagüey
8. Amauri Peña Rodríguez, Las Tunas
9. Raúl Chávez Valdivia. Granma
10. Eidy Graña Toledo, Holguín
11. Dr. Arnoldo de la Cruz Bañobre, Santiago de Cuba.
12. Argos Alejandro Matos Ricardo, Havana city

== See also ==
- List of political parties in Cuba
- Contributions to liberal theory
- Liberalism worldwide
- List of liberal parties
- Liberal democracy
- Liberalism in Cuba
