= Democratic Social-Revolutionary Party of Cuba =

Democratic Social-Revolutionary Party of Cuba Partido Social-Revolucionario Democrático de Cuba
- General Secretary: Jorge Valls (Until 2015)
- Founded: 1992; 34 years ago
- Headquarters: Miami, United States
- Ideology: Democratic socialism
- Political position: Left-wing
- International affiliation: Progressive International
- Colours: Red

Website
- www.psrdc.org

The Democratic Social-Revolutionary Party of Cuba (Partido Social-Revolucionario Democrático de Cuba, PSRDC) is a democratic socialist political party in Cuba. Although changes to the Cuban constitution in 1992 decriminalized the right to form political parties other than the Communist Party of Cuba, no parties are permitted to campaign or engage in public political activities on the island. Public engagements by party members are typically restricted to international gatherings of democratic socialist groups.

The main political aims of the PSRDC are to persuade the Cuban government to declare a political amnesty and to reinstall a sovereign National Constituent Assembly which the party believes was abandoned following Fulgencio Batista's coup d'état in 1952. They also call for more freedom in Cuba's state controlled press and an end to what they consider Cuba's human rights violations. The party also condemns the role of the United States in the region, requesting that both Cubans and Americans overcome the compulsion to compare the merits and shortfalls of each system, describing such dialogue as unconstructive.

== See also ==
- List of political parties in Cuba
