= International Women's Forum =

Organization connecting women leaders

- Abbreviation: IWF
- Formation: 1974; 52 years ago
- Purpose: To support women leaders
- Location: Washington, D.C.
- Members: c. 7,800
- Website: www.iwforum.org
- Formerly called: Women's Forum of New York

The International Women's Forum (IWF), founded in 1974 as the Women's Forum of New York, is an invitation-only women's organization with some 7,800 members. Its mission is "to support the women leaders of today and tomorrow". The IWF hosts two conferences each year to address women's issues and it provides intensive leadership training programs for women. The Leadership Foundation, Inc., a supporting organization, provides a Fellows Program and the Women Athletes Business Network (WABN) Program.

== Members ==
The IWF has been described as "highly influential". Notable members of the organization have included Hillary Clinton, Madeleine Albright, Sandra Day O'Connor, Coretta King, Betty Friedan, and Katharine Graham, and among the membership are "inventors, entrepreneurs, CEOs, heads of state, academics, scientists, astronauts, Olympic athletes, artists, filmmakers, financiers, philanthropists, and more".

== History ==
The group started as the Women's Forum of New York, founded in 1974 by Elinor Guggenheimer, Muriel Siebert, Eleanor Holmes Norton, and Muriel Fox. Over the next few years, it expanded to Atlanta, Chicago, Colorado, Los Angeles, New York, San Francisco, and Washington, D.C. In 1982, it became international with the addition of the United Kingdom and was renamed the International Women's Forum in 1987. It is active in Europe, Asia, Latin America and the Middle East as well as the United States.

== "Women Who Make a Difference" ==
The IWF maintains an International Hall of Fame and confers an annual "Women Who Make a Difference" award. Past awardees have included:

- 2000: Italian politician Beatrice Rangoni Machiavelli
- 2010: American judge Leigh Saufley
- 2011: Singaporean urban planner and architect Dr. Cheong Koon Hean
- 2012: Nyamko Sabuni, Swedish Minister for Gender Equality
- 2014: Zanele Mbeki, founder of the Women's Development Banking Trust and former First Lady of South Africa
- 2015: Sister Stanislaus Kennedy, founder of Focus Ireland
- 2016: American lawyer Gloria Allred
- 2016: Ilya Espino de Marotta, engineer who led the Panama Canal Expansion Project
- 2017: American lawyer and academic Danielle Conway
- 2018: American author and organizer Charlotte Bunch
