= Social Democratic Co-ordination of Cuba =

Social Democratic Co-ordination of Cuba Corriente Socialdemócrata Cubana
- Ideology: Social democracy
- Political position: Centre-left
- International affiliation: Progressive Alliance

The Social Democratic Co-ordination of Cuba (Spanish: Coordinadora Social Demócrata de Cuba) is a political party in Cuba, with a social democratic ideology.

== See also ==
- List of political parties in Cuba
