= Khwaja Saeed Hai =

Pakistani tennis player (1930–2021)

- Country (sports): Pakistan
- Residence: Karachi, Pakistan
- Born: 5 March 1930 British India
- Died: 31 March 2021 (aged 91)
- Turned pro: 1953 (amateur)
- Retired: 1962
- Plays: Right-handed

Singles

Grand Slam singles results
- French Open: 2R (1956)
- Wimbledon: 1R (1955, 1956)
- US Open: 1R (1964)

Khwaja Saeed Hai (5 March 1930 – 31 March 2021) was a Pakistani No. 1 tennis player, and the first Pakistani tennis player to reach the main draw of a Grand Slam through qualifying matches. He featured in the main draw of the Wimbledon Championships in 1955 and 1956, and reached the second round of French Open. He also played in the U.S. Open in 1964, and played in the Davis Cup for Pakistan.

== Early life and education ==
He studied at the Aligarh Muslim University, where he honed his skills. At Wimbledon he played men's singles, men's doubles and mixed doubles.

== Career ==
Apart from playing in the Davis Cup, he captained Pakistan's Davis Cup team 32 times with results that have not been achieved by any other captain from the country.

When the French Tennis Federation celebrated 100 years of French Championship at Roland Garros stadium, they built a commemorative wall displaying the names of players who had done well during the championship which included the name of Saeed Hai. In 1956 he won the Wiltshire County Open Championships on grass at Trowbridge in England against the American player George Ball.

Saeed Hai was also the founder President of the International club whose head office is in England. Membership is only open for Grand Slam and Davis Cup players.

The International Tennis Federation (ITF) awarded him a gold medal at their annual general meeting held in Lausanne (Switzerland) before 300 delegates from 198 affiliated associations of ITF including Pakistan.

He was senior vice president of the Pakistan Tennis Federation (PTF) and a sports legend in the country.

== Personal life ==
He married model Fawzia Saeed Hai, in the 1960. They remained married until her death and had four children together: three daughters and one son.

== Death ==
Khawaja Saaed Hai died on 31 March 2021 at the age of 91.
