= Qasim Razvi =

Hyderabadi Deccani Milita Leader (1902–1970)

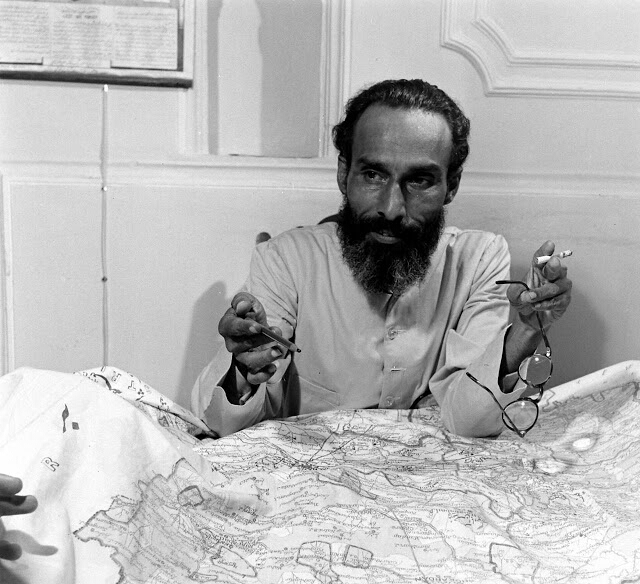
- Razvi during Operation Polo
- Born: Syed Muhammad Qasim Razvi; 17 July 1902; Lucknow, United Provinces, British India
- Died: 15 January 1970 (aged 67); Karachi, Pakistan
- Resting place: Paposh Nagar Graveyard
- Education: Aligarh Muslim University
- Occupations: Lawyer, politician
- Children: 10 (5 sons & 5 daughters) (Sarwar Sultana, Syed Ahmed Kazim Razvi, Syed Ahmed Asif Razvi, Syed Ahmed Arif Razvi, Zakia, Fouzia, Razia, Tayyaba, Syed Ahmed Nasir Razvi, Syed Ahmed Farooq Razvi)
- Parent: Syed Ahmad Khan Razvi

Syed Muhammad Qasim Razvi (17 July 1902 – 15 January 1970) was a politician in the princely state of Hyderabad. He was the president of the Majlis-e-Ittehadul Muslimeen party from December 1946 until the state's Annexation by India in 1948. He was also the founder of the Razakar militia in the state. He held the levers of power with the Nizam of Hyderabad, blocking the possibilities of his accommodation with the Dominion of India.

According to scholar Lucien Benichou, "[Razvi] can arguably be considered to have been the political figure whose influence and unrealistic vision proved the most detrimental to the interests of the State in the crucial years of 1947–48."

== Early life and career ==
Qasim Razvi was born in Lucknow, United Provinces and studied law at the Aligarh Muslim University. He migrated to state of Hyderabad after graduation and did a short apprenticeship with Mohammad Ali Fazil in the Hyderabad city. Then he settled down as a lawyer in Latur, Osmanabad district, where he had contacts through his father-in-law, Abdul Hai, who was a former Deputy Superintendent of Police.

According to former Hyderabad civil servant Mohammad Hyder, Latur had loose law and order. Razvi amassed a small fortune in shady dealings. After joining the Majlis-e-Ittehadul Muslimeen (Ittehad), Razvi is said to have donated all his property to the party, which made him famous and earned him the title of Siddique-e-Deccan.

After the premature death of Nawab Bahadur Yar Jung (the founding leader) in 1944, the Ittehad party fell into fractious extremism. Razvi tried to establish his distinctiveness by advocating political reforms, even though they were not palatable to the Ittehad membership. Then he established his own association in Latur, named Majlis-e-Islah Nazm-o-Nasq, ostensibly to bring about reforms but more likely to establish his own independent following away from the mainstream of the party.

In February 1946, the extremists in the party led by Abdur Rahman Rais staged a violent protest over the reconstruction of a mosque, burning down the house of the prime minister Nawab of Chhatari and Sir Wilfrid Grigson, the minister for revenue and police. The incident led to the resignation of the leader of the Ittehad. In the ensuing contest for the new president, Qasim Razvi defeated Rais to emerge as the leader of the Ittehad. His extremism matched that of Rais and the moderates in the party distanced themselves from both the candidates. From this point on, Razvi called the shots in Hyderabad politics.

== Leadership of Ittehad ==
The Razakars were Muslim separatists who advocated the continuation of Nizam's rule and tried to convince the Nizam to accede to Pakistan. After accession to Pakistan proved impossible owing to the distance of Hyderabad from Pakistan, Razvi encouraged the Nizam to take a hardline stance and ordered the Razakars to resist the accession of Hyderabad to the newly formed Government of India. Razvi even traveled to Delhi and had a stormy meeting with Indian leader Sardar Vallabhbhai Patel. He is quoted to have said "Death with the sword in hand, is always preferable to extinction by a mere stroke of the pen", prompting the Indian government to call him "the Nizam's Frankenstein monster". P. V. Kate characterizes him as a religious Muslim fanatic who "insisted on the right of Muslims to enslave the Hindu." Razvi launched criminal attacks on the Hindu population, leading to military action by India. He was also implicated in the murder of patriotic progressive Muslims such as Shoebullah Khan who condemned Razvi's Razakars and advocated merger with India.

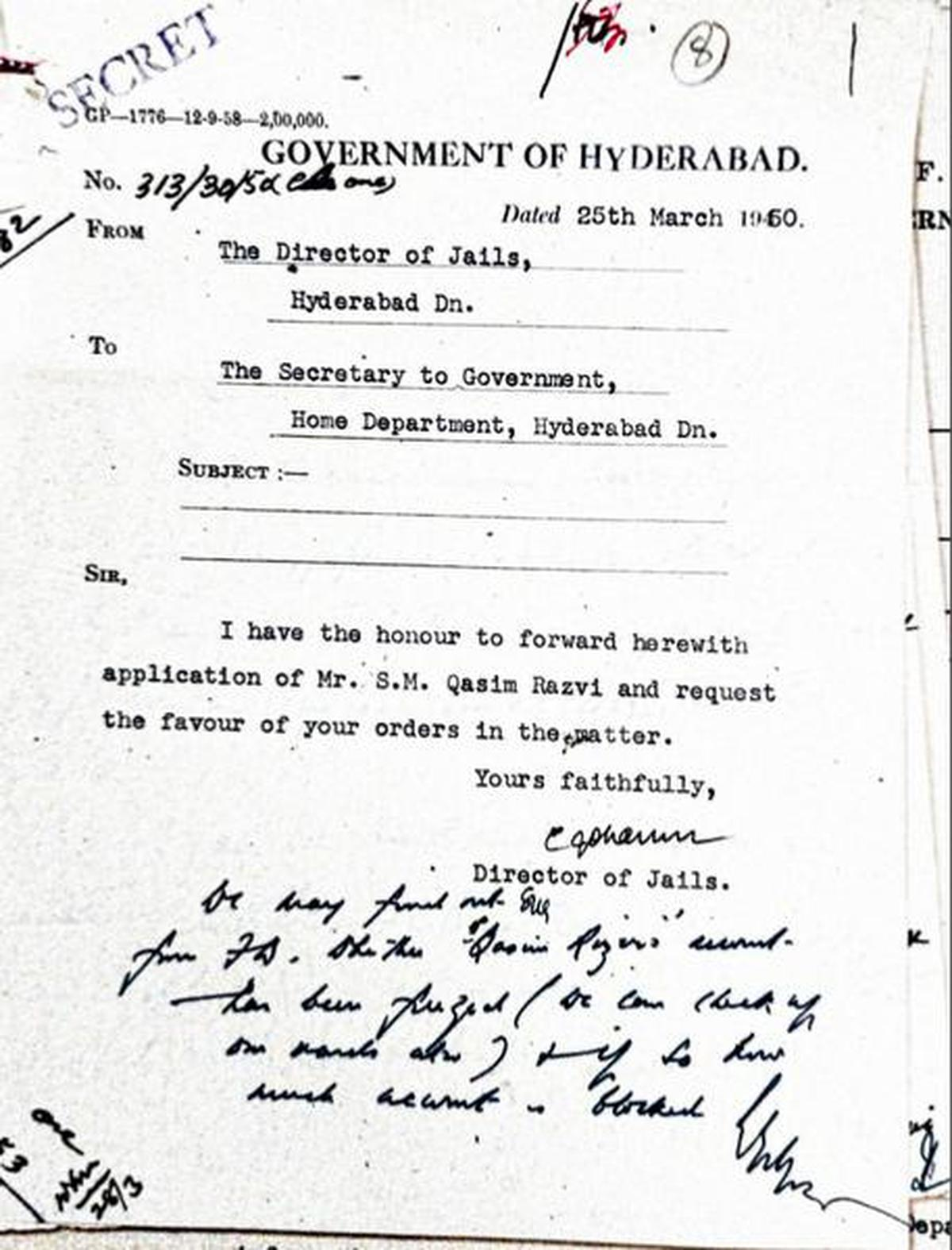
Request from Qasim Razvi for withdrawing money from frozen bank account to buy cigarettes

After Operation Polo, in which the Indian Army defeated the Razakars and annexed Hyderabad, merging it with India, Razvi was placed under house arrest and tried under Indian laws on seditious activities and inciting communal violence. He was jailed from 1948 to 1957 at Trimulgherry jail. He was released from prison only on an undertaking that he would migrate to Pakistan within forty-eight hours of his release. He agreed to migrate to Pakistan as a condition of his release from prison, where he died in 1970. His family had been residing there since 1949.

Qasim Rizvi was not in favour of cross-border conflict and maintained that his goal was self-defence and the preservation of the Hyderabad State:

"[I]f the Razakars attack the Indian territories they will not help the cause of the Hyderabad State nor its Muslims. Why should the Muslims of Hyderabad unnecessarily want to destroy themselves and others? For what purpose will Hyderabad indulge in such useless actions? It is the Indian Union, in contrast, which has every reason to attack Hyderabad."

According to the Former Prime Minister of Hyderabad state Mir Laiq Ali, many "anti-social elements" joined the Razakars and regretfully stated that with the expansion of the movement Qasim Rizvi was no longer able to control the Razakars.

== Personal life ==
Qasim had 10 children (5 sons & 5 daughters) including a "professor, doctor, fashion designer, [and] counsellor" who have settled in various countries around the world.

== See also ==
- Hyderabad massacres
- Annexation of Hyderabad
- Razakars (Pakistan)

== Bibliography ==
- Benichou, Lucien D. (2000), From Autocracy to Integration: Political Developments in Hyderabad State, 1938-1948, Orient Blackswan, ISBN 978-81-250-1847-6
- Hyder, Mohammed (2012), October Coup, A Memoir of the Struggle for Hyderabad, Roli Books, ISBN 978-8174368508
- Raghavan, Srinath (2010), War and Peace in Modern India, Palgrave Macmillan, ISBN 978-1-137-00737-7
