= María Elena Cruz Varela =

Cuban human rights activist (born 1953)

María Elena Cruz Varela (born 17 August 1953) is a Cuban human rights activist and poet. She became known as a leader within the Cuban opposition movement in the early 1990s, writing a popular pamphlet listing grievances against the government and demanding reforms, including national debates and free elections. Cruz Varela served a two-year custodial prison sentence between 1991 and 1993 on charges of "illegal association" and "defamation", during which time she was recognised by Amnesty International as a prisoner of conscience. In 1994, she left Cuba and currently lives in exile in the United States.

== Personal life ==
Cruz Varela was born in Colón, Matanzas Province on 17 August 1953. She later moved to Havana, where she had two children. In 1994, after leaving Cuba, she lived for a decade in Madrid, Spain, before moving to the United States, residing in Puerto Rico for a time before settling in Miami.

== Writing career ==
Cruz Varela began publishing poetry during the 1980s, including Afueras está lloviendo (1987) and Hija de Eva (1989). The latter won her the Julián del Casal National Poetry Prize in 1989, which increased her prominence within the Cuban literary scene. Cruz Varela's work was known for its reflections on her life and activism, as well as the experiences of disadvantaged communities within Cuba.

Following Cruz Varela's departure from Cuba in 1994, she wrote a new collection of poetry entitled Balada de la Sangre (lit. 'Ballad of the Blood'), which was published in 1996. In 2001, Cruz Varela released her autobiography, Dios en las cárceles cubanas (lit. 'God in the Cuban Jails'), in which she described her 1991 arrest and imprisonment.

== Activism ==
By 1990, Cruz Varela had become known for her criticisms of Fidel Castro, the then-leader of Cuba, which led to her becoming sidelined from her recently-attained prominence within the cultural scene in Havana. She co-founded and served as president of Criterio Alternativo (lit. 'Alternative Criteria'), an anti-Castro organisation that was part of the wider Cuban Democratic Convergence movement of loosely unified opposition groups. In 1991, Criterio Alternativo published a manifesto demanding reforms to Cuban political structures, including the holding of national debates and free elections. Cruz Varela was also among the signatories of the Carta de los diez (lit. 'Letter of the Ten'), an open letter to Fidel Castro signed by 10 prominent Cuban writers.

In November 1991, shortly before her arrest, Cruz Varela was among a group of dissidents who met with the President of the Principality of Asturias, Juan Luis Rodríguez-Vigil, during his state visit to Cuba.

=== 1991 arrest and imprisonment ===
Between 19 November and 21 November 1993, Cruz Varela's home in Havana was besieged by a mob consisting of officers from the Cuban Revolutionary Armed Forces. She and her children were prevented from leaving the home to access food and water, and Cruz Varela received injuries to her jaw after officers attempted to force feed her physical copies of the manifestos previously published by Criterio Alternativo. The siege of Cruz Varela's home ended when she was arrested and detained.

On 28 November 1991, Cruz Varela was sentenced to two years' imprisonment after being accused of writing "offensive, slanderous pamphlets" that had called for "public demonstrations and questioned the authority of the National Assembly"; she was found guilty of illegal association and defamation.

Cruz Varela served her sentence at Combinado del Sur Prison in Matanzas. In April and May 1992, she was hospitalised at Carlos J. Finlay Military Hospital for treatment for a gynaecological illness. Following her release, she was placed under house arrest for two years.

== Recognition ==
In 1992, while imprisoned, Cruz Varela received the Prize For Freedom from Liberal International in recognition of her contribution to human rights and political freedoms in Cuba. She was able to accept the award in person in 1994 after leaving Cuba. Amnesty International designated Cruz Varela as a prisoner of conscience during her time in prison.

In 1997, Nilo Cruz wrote a play, Two Sisters and a Piano, loosely based on Cruz Varela's life.

Cruz Varela's testimony of her experiences in Cuba are including in the University of Miami's Cuban Heritage Collection.
