= Hakima El Haite =

Moroccan climate scientist, entrepreneur and politician (born 1963)

- حكيمة الحيطي
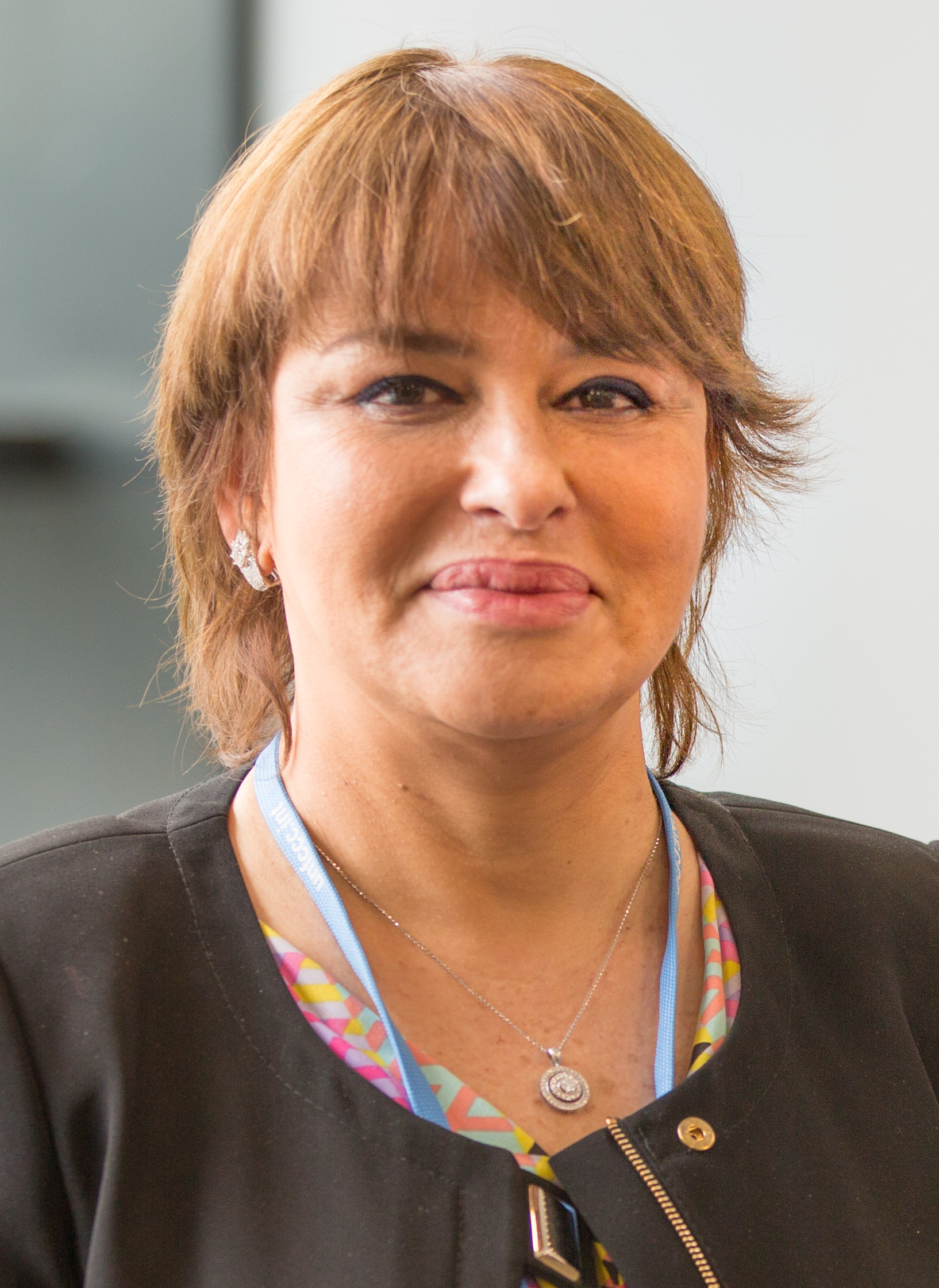
- Hakima El Haite in May 2016
- Born: 13 May 1963 (age 63); Fez, Morocco
- Education: Moulay Ismail University
- Occupations: Climate scientist, politician
- Political party: Popular Movement

Hakima El Haite (born 13 May 1963) is a Moroccan climate scientist, entrepreneur and politician.

In 1994 she founded EauGlobe, the first environmental engineering firm in the MENA region. She served as minister delegate in charge of the environment for the Kingdom of Morocco from 2013 to 2017. In 2015, she was elected vice president of the United Nations Climate Change Conference (COP21). She was appointed special envoy for climate change of the Kingdom of Morocco from 2015 to 2017 and the high level climate champion of the United Nations International Climate Conference (COP22) from 2016 to 2017.

She was the president of the Liberal International since December 2018 until December 2024. the first non-European in this post.

== Early life and education ==
El Haite was born in Fez on 13 May 1963. She has a degree in biology and microbiology from Sidi Mohamed Ben Abdellah University in Fez (1986), a postgraduate degree in ecotoxicology from Moulay Ismail University in Meknes (1987). She has two PhDs, one in environmental studies from the University of Meknes (1991) and one in environmental engineering from the École Nationale Supérieure des Mines de Saint-Étienne in Saint-Étienne, France with a thesis on the treatment of wastewater. She also has a diploma in political communication from the University of Washington in the United States (2008).

== Career ==
El Haite worked for the urban agency of Fez in territorial administration until 1993. She was also the Treasurer of the National Union of Women. In 1994, she founded the company EauGlobe, which specializes in engineering and environmental consulting. She is Vice President of US-NAPEO, the US-North Africa Partnership for Economic Opportunity, and ConnectinGroup International, the first organization training women for appointed office.

El Haite is a member of the Popular Movement political party. In 2007, she became president of the Association of Women Entrepreneurs in Morocco. She became president of the International Network of Liberal Women in 2012. Since December 2012, she has been president of the International Relations of the Popular Movement.

El Haite was appointed Minister Delegate in Charge of the Environment for the Minister of Energy, Mines, Water and Environment in 2013. In this position she oversees environmental policies in the constitution so that a sustainable development component is included in every public policy initiative. Morocco also has environmental police.

She participated in the 2013 United Nations Climate Change Conference in Warsaw and 2014 United Nations Climate Change Conference in Lima before taking a leading role in 2015 United Nations Climate Change Conference, the climate change negotiations in Paris in December 2015. In May 2016, she was appointed a "High Level Climate Change Champion" by the Conference of Parties to the United Nations Framework Convention on Climate Change.

On 19 September 2016, El Haite gave the keynote address at the opening event of Climate Week NYC in New York City, calling on world leaders to move from their Paris Agreement commitments to more robust climate action. She was a host of 2016 United Nations Climate Change Conference in Marrakesh in November 2016.

== Personal life ==
El Haite is fluent in Arabic, English and French.

== Awards and honours ==
In 2014, El Haite was awarded the Freedom Prize by the Spanish Foundation Women for Freedom and Democracy. In December 2016, she received the insignia of Chevalier of the Legion of Honour of the French Republic from President François Hollande. The award was presented by former Prime Minister Laurent Fabius for her national and international commitment to the ecological cause.

== Publications ==
- El Haite, Hakima (12 April 2010). "Traitement Des Eaux Usees Par Les Reservoirs Operationnells et Reuse Pour L'Irrigation" (doctoral thesis). Ecole Nationale Supérieure des Mines.
- El Haité, Hakima (2015). "Les passions d'une ministre engagée". Vraiment Durable. 1: 137–146.
- El Haite, Hakima (23 November 2016). "COP22: Time for Action". UNEP Climate Action.
