= Cuban Democratic Socialist Current =

Cuban Democratic Socialist Current Corriente Socialista Democrática Cubana
- Ideology: Democratic socialism Social democracy
- Political position: Centre-left
- International affiliation: Socialist International

Website
- partidoarcoprogresista.org

The Cuban Democratic Socialist Current (Corriente Socialista Democrática Cubana) is a Cuban social democratic party. In late 2001, it participated in the Socialist International meeting in Santo Domingo. In 2003 its president was Rolando Prats.

== See also ==
- List of political parties in Cuba
