= Cuban Liberal Union =

Cuban Liberal Union Unión Liberal Cubana
- Headquarters: Marbella, Spain
- Ideology: Liberalism; Anti-communism
- Political position: Centre
- International affiliation: Liberal International
- Regional affiliation: RELIAL

Website
- www.cubaliberal.org

The Cuban Liberal Union (Spanish: Unión Liberal Cubana) is a liberal party of Cuba composed of exiles, with no formal representation in the country. The party is a member of Liberal International.

== See also ==
- List of political parties in Cuba
- Liberalism worldwide
- List of liberal parties
- Liberalism in Cuba
