= International Socialist Group (Cuba) =

The International Socialist Group (Spanish: Agrupación Socialista International) was a political organization in Cuba, formed in 1905 by émigré Spanish socialists who were followers of the Spanish Socialist Workers' Party (PSOE). In November 1906 the group merged with the Socialist Workers Party, forming the Socialist Party of the Island of Cuba.
