= Fouzia El Bayed =

Moroccan women's rights advocate and politician

- فوزية البيض

Member of the Moroccan Parliament
- In office 2011–2016

Personal details
- Party: Constitutional Union

Fouzia El Bayed (also Elbayed; Arabic: فوزية البيض, romanized: Fawzīyah al-Bīḍ) is a Moroccan women's rights advocate, a former member of the Parliament of Morocco belonging to the Constitutional Union party, a member of the Human Rights Committee of Liberal International, and the first president of the Morocco chapter of the International Network of Liberal Women.
