= Beatrice Rangoni Machiavelli =

Italian politician, author and activist

Beatrice Rangoni Machiavelli is an Italian politician, author, and activist. She was President of the Economic and Social Committee of the European Union from 1998 to 2000.

== Life ==
Machiavelli was born in Rome to a prominent family and studied physics and political science. She started her career as a journalist and essayist. From 1985 to 1994 she co-edited Libro Aperto magazine with Giovanni Malagodi. For ten years she directed the weekly La Tribuna, the press organ of the Italian Liberal Party. In 1982 she became a member of the European Economic and Social Committee, on which she served until 2002. On October 15, 1998, she was elected President of the committee.

In an interview Machiavelli said that as a member of a wealthy Lombard family, she grew up around educated, emancipated women. It was not until she read Ainsi soit-elle by the feminist author Benoîte Groult that she became aware of the subjugation of women outside her privileged circle. She became a strong advocate for women's rights, as well as human rights in general. As a member of Les Femmes d'Europe, a feminist organization, she worked for the rights of women prisoners. She was the Italian correspondent for Women of Europe, a magazine published in nine languages by the European Community. She was part of the Italian delegation to the United Nations World Conference on Women in Nairobi, Kenya, in 1985.

She is a patron of the International Network of Liberal Women and a member of the Board of Directors of the National Association of Public Service Users (Assoutenti); Italian Society for International Organization (SIOI); Atlantic Committee (ATA); and the Italian Association of Women for Development (AIDOS). She has published essays and articles on economic and social problems and on the theme of European integration. In 2016 she self-published a memoir, Viaggio Nella Memoria.

== Awards ==
In 2000 she was named a "Woman Who Makes a Difference" by the International Women's Forum. The following year she was named an officer of the Legion of Honour by French president Jacques Chirac for her dedication to the European cause. In 2005 she was named a Grand Officer of the Order of Merit of the Italian Republic by president Carlo Azeglio Ciampi.
