= Saguan Democratic Party =

The Saguan Democratic Party (Spanish: Partido Democrático Sagüero) was a short-lived political party in Sagua la Grande, founded in 1899. The party was led by Calixto Casals, José V. Andreu and Eduardo F. Rodríguez. The party gathered local interests which opposed the U.S. military occupation of Cuba.
