= Fouzia Ejaz Khan =

Pakistani politician

Member of the National Assembly of Pakistan
- In office 2008–2012

Personal details
- Party: PMLN (2025-present)
- Other political affiliations: MQM-L (2008-2012)

Fouzia Ejaz Khan (Urdu: فوزیہ اعجاز خان) is a Pakistani politician who served as member of the National Assembly of Pakistan.

== Personal life ==
Fouzia is daughter of Pakistani politician Kasim Razvi of Hyderabad State. Her daughter, Atiya Khan is an ex- supermodel and Sufi filmmaker in Pakistan.

== Political career ==
She was elected to the National Assembly of Pakistan as a candidate of Muttahida Qaumi Movement on a seat reserved for women from Sindh in the 2008 Pakistani general election. She resigned from her National Assembly seat in 2012 due to having a dual nationality.
