= Faouzi Khidr =

Egyptian teacher and writer (1950–2025)

- فوزي خضر
- Born: 1950; Alexandria, Egypt
- Died: 4 December 2025 (aged 75)
- Citizenship: Egyptian
- Occupations: Writer, poet and teacher
- Notable work: Diwan Faouzi Khidr, Poets from Alexandria, Cities of the Unknown

Faouzi Khidr (Arabic: فوزي خضر; 1950 – 4 December 2025) was an Egyptian teacher, journalist, writer and manuscript specialist at the Bibliotheca Alexandrina, an advisor to the General Authority for Cultural Palaces, and a university professor.

== Early life ==
Faouzi began his life in Alexandria and was educated there by great professors who embrace and guide poets, as he said in one of his statements. He used to write his poems and present them to his professors, and the poet Mahjoub Musa was telling them about heritage and pre-Islamic poetry, and the atmosphere at that time was suitable for poetry and creativity according to it. The poet traveled to the Egyptian capital, Cairo, and got acquainted with the poet Salah Abdel Sabour, who presented him to the radio, discussing his poems, as he was enthusiastic about his poetic experience and heralded it.

During this period, newspapers began to publish about him and he had some poems, then he met the novelist Naguib Mahfouz in his weekly session, in which poets and writers used to gather. Then he returned to Alexandria and began reading. His contemporary with great poets and writers such as Amal Dunqul, Salah Abdel Sabour and Abdel Qader Al-Qat had the greatest impact on his experience and contact with this supportive and stimulating atmosphere for knowledge.

== Career ==
Faouzi Khidr published in 2005 the novel The Most Famous Trips to the Arabian Peninsula by Al Obeikan Publishing and Distribution. In the form of sessions between the Sheikh and his grandchildren. These trips are arranged in chronological order: Al-Saraqusti, Al-Hamdani Al-Yamani, Al-Masudi, Al-Astakhri, Al-Hamadhani Al-Khorasani, Ibn Hawqal, Al-Maqdisi, Al-Idrisi, Ibn Jubayr, and Yaqut Al-Hamawi.

The Egyptian writer has another novel, The Poet of Tortured Love, which was issued by the Egyptian Lebanese House in about 84 pages, in which Fawzi talks about the Andalusian civilization, specifically its writers, poets and thinkers, especially poets who were interested in the Arabic poem with what was known as muwashahat, which was considered a real revolution in the style of poetic performances by which special poetry was known. In his book, Faouzi touched on the poet Ibn Zaydun, who occupied the top of poetry in his time, as he said, and his news flew to the East with the birth of Bint Al-Mustaqfi to stand on an equal footing with the Arab love poets who were known in the literary ages of the East. This book roamed the life, thought and feeling of Ibn Zaydun, a life of intense suffering, as the Egyptian writer mentioned, characterized by ebb and flow, victory and frustration, madness and reason. The book The Arab Science in the Civilization of the West is considered one of the most famous works of the writer, which was issued by Delta Publishing and Distribution, as well as the book Diwan Faouzi Khidr (Part One) which was issued by the General Egyptian Book Organization as part of the Diwan of Arabic Poetry series in about 459 pages. As well as the book The Contribution of Arab Scientists to Human Civilization, which was issued by the Arab Nile Endowment for Publishing and Distribution in 288 pages, in which he talks about Faouzi and about a number of Arab scientists and how they contributed thanks to their scientific discoveries in building and developing human civilization. Cities of the Unknown is another novel published by the Egyptian writer and classified within the literature of the pre-Islamic Arab era. The novel was published by the General Egyptian Book Authority in about 126 pages. Poets from Alexandria is the title of another novel by Khidr in the Writers and Poets section. This novel was published sometime in 2006 by Dar Al-Wafa Ladonia Printing and Publishing in 235 pages, in which Faouzi talks in some detail about the city of Alexandria, which he considers his dream city as well as being the center of cultural radiation for him. Faouzi sees in this book that Alexandria, which lived its history, combined the civilization of the East and the civilization of the West, in which poets emerged who contributed with their creativity, starting from ancient times to Islamic times and finally in its modern eras. The author's oldest well-known work was the book Dr. Mustafa Al-Rafei, which was published by the International Book Company, a series of personalities from my country. This is the first book in the series and is concerned with talking about Mustafa Al-Rafei and his thoughts and positions.

In the first chapter, which consists of two chapters, the biography of Al-Rafei and his environment was discussed, as was the era of Al-Rafei, the position of Tripoli, the birthplace of Al-Rafei, his secondary and primary studies, his travel from the homeland and his return to it, his studies in Cairo, his entry into the battle of life, his marriage, his travel to Paris and his access to He has a doctorate in law and literature, his practice of law and then the legal judiciary, the difficulties that he encountered in his new career, his entry into the foreign corps, impressions of Al-Rafei's life in Beirut, his official invitation to visit America, and in the second chapter his printed traces are dealt with, as for his unprinted traces, which are a phrase on the books that are still out of print, namely: Islam, the constitution of life, life and seasons in Islam, lectures by Al-Rafei and his private memoirs, they were referred to as a reminder of their material, While the third chapter focused on Al-Rafei's position through the positions he occupied, to the sayings of men of thought and literature in which they praised Al-Rafei's research, and then the medals presented to him in appreciation of his knowledge, thought, and scientific and social status.

== Death ==
Khidr died on 4 December 2025, at the age of 75.

== Awards ==
Faouzi Khidr was received the Prince Abdullah Al-Faisal Prize for theatrical poetry, after a work trip that resulted in 75 printed books in Egypt, Saudi Arabia, Kuwait and Jordan, and Khidr also received a number of awards, including the State Incentive Award in poetry, and the first prize in radio writing on the level of Arab radio stations for his program "An Arab Book, Knowledge of the World", and other awards, and the winning poetic play bears the title "The Chief Sheikh Ibn Sina" and falls into three chapters. He received many other awards, including: The State Incentive Award in Poetry 1994 - The second prize at the level of the Arab countries in theatrical composition 1994. The first prize at the level of Arab radio stations in radio composition from 1991.

== List of his works ==
This is a list of the most prominent works of the Egyptian writer Faouzi Khidr:

• Diwan Faouzi Khidr

( Original title: Diwan Faouzi Khidr ).

• The most popular trips to Arabia

( Original title: Ashhar alrihlat ilaa jazirat alarab ).

• Ibn Zaydun: The Poet of Tortured Love

( Original title: Ibn Zidon : shaaer elhab elmoaazab ).

• Arabic Science in Western Civilization

( Original title: Al ilem alarabi fi hadarat algharb ).

• The contribution of Arab scholars to human civilization

( Original title: Esihah elolamai alarab fi alhadarah aliensaneyah ).

• Cities of the unknown

( Original title: Madaien almagehol ).

• Poets from Alexandria

( Original title: Shuaara min al'iskandaria )

• Dr. Mustafa Al-Rafei

( Original title: Alduktour Mustafaa Alraafiei ).
