= Princess Fawzia of Egypt (disambiguation) =

Princess Fawzia of Egypt (1921–2013) was the daughter of King Fuad I of Egypt, and the first wife of Mohammad Reza Pahlavi, Shah of Iran.

Princess Fawzia of Egypt (Arabic: الأميرة فوزية) may also refer to:

- Princess Fawzia of Egypt (1940–2005), daughter of King Farouk of Egypt
- Princess Fawzia-Latifa of Egypt (born 1982), daughter of King Fuad II of Egypt
