= Fawziya Mahran =

Egyptian writer and critic (1931–2019)

- Born: December 5, 1931
- Died: November 2, 2019 (aged 87); Al Qalyubia, Egypt
- Occupations: Writer and critic
- Awards: The State Appreciation Award in Literature

Fawziya Mahran (Arabic: فوزية مهران) (5 December 1931 – 2 November 2019) was an Egyptian writer and critic. Known as "Sayidat Albahar" and "Lady of the Sea", she wrote in various Arabic writing branches for around seventy years.

She came from the Alexandrian countryside to study English literature in Cairo's University where she graduated in 1956. In 2015, she received The State Appreciation Award in Literature.

== Career ==
Mahran's writing included fiction, theatre, criticism, journalism, intellectual writing, and translation. Her writing became popular when the Egyptian cinema produced one of her first novels as the film "Bait Al-Talibat", also known as "The Girls' Dormitory", directed by Ahmed Diaa Al-Din in 1976. The film was inspired by her arrival to the capital and her stay in the girls' dormitory while studying in Cairo's university. Other of her literary works have also been turned into films and TV series.

She was a pioneer in women's journalism in Egypt. Moreover, she contributed to the development of theatre in different parts of Egypt. She was one of the founders of Sabah Al-Khair magazine with the late Ahmed Bahaa El-Deen and Salah Jahin, who supported her in her early writing career. The first issue of the magazine was published in January 1956. In the early 1960s, she moved to Rose Al-Yosuf magazine where she was responsible for the culture section. Since the launch of Al-Osboa (The Week) newspaper in 1997, she had her own weekly column entitled 'Ayn' 'Eye'. She also wrote in various Egyptian and Arabic newspapers.

Fawziya translated some western books such as the novel "A Certain Smile" by Françoise Sagan, a book on "women in the literature of George Bernard Shaw", and others. Moreover, she presented a range of research and studies in theatrical and literary criticism such as: "The leaves of Latifa Al-Zayyat: The Fierce and Beautiful", "Contemporary Qur'anic Attitudes", "My Lord, Make for Me a Sign", "A Sign and a Good Tiding", and others.

Fawziya supported women's issues in her writings as well as shedding light on many new writers. She became a member the general syndicate of the Egyptian Writers Union since 1988 and became a member of its administration since 2001 to 2003. She was also a member of the film selection jury at the Cairo International Film Festival for more than twenty years. During her journalistic career, she met leading thinkers and writers including Taha Hussein and Abbas Al-Aqqad.

She was the first to report on the involvement of intelligence agencies in the US in the death of Marilyn Monroe. It was reported in New York, Washington, and Paris in addition to some newspapers in Britain, France, and Spain.

== Works ==
- Statues Commit Suicide (Al-Tamatheel Tantahir).
- The Horses of The Sea (Jiad Al-Bahr).
- The Breakwater (Hajiz Al-Amwaj).
- A Sign and A Good Tiding (Aya Wa Bushra).
- Contemporary Qur'anic Attitudes (Mwawaqif Qurania Mu'asra).
- The Leaves of Latifa Al-Zayyat.
- The Girls' Dormitory (Bait Al-Talibat).
- The Brothers' Lighthouse (Fanar Al-Akhawain).
- The Sea Song (Augniat Al-Bahr).
- Egyptian Women Are Pioneers and Innovators (Misriyat Ra'idat Mubdi'at).

== Awards ==
- Received The State Appreciation Award in Literature for all her literary works.
- In 2015, she was honored at the Permanent Arabic Narrative Forum in Cairo for her excellence in literary presentation.

== Death ==
She died on November 2, 2019, at the age of 87. Many of her career companions participated in the burial ceremony in Sandbis village in Qaha city in Al-Qalyubiyya Governorate. She suffered for years due to replaced joints, leading to a health crisis, which resulted in her being admitted to the intensive care unit at Badran hospital in Al-Duqa, where she remained in for four days. After her condition improved, she was moved to a normal room. She died at her home after leaving the hospital.
