= Annemie Neyts-Uyttebroeck =

Belgian politician

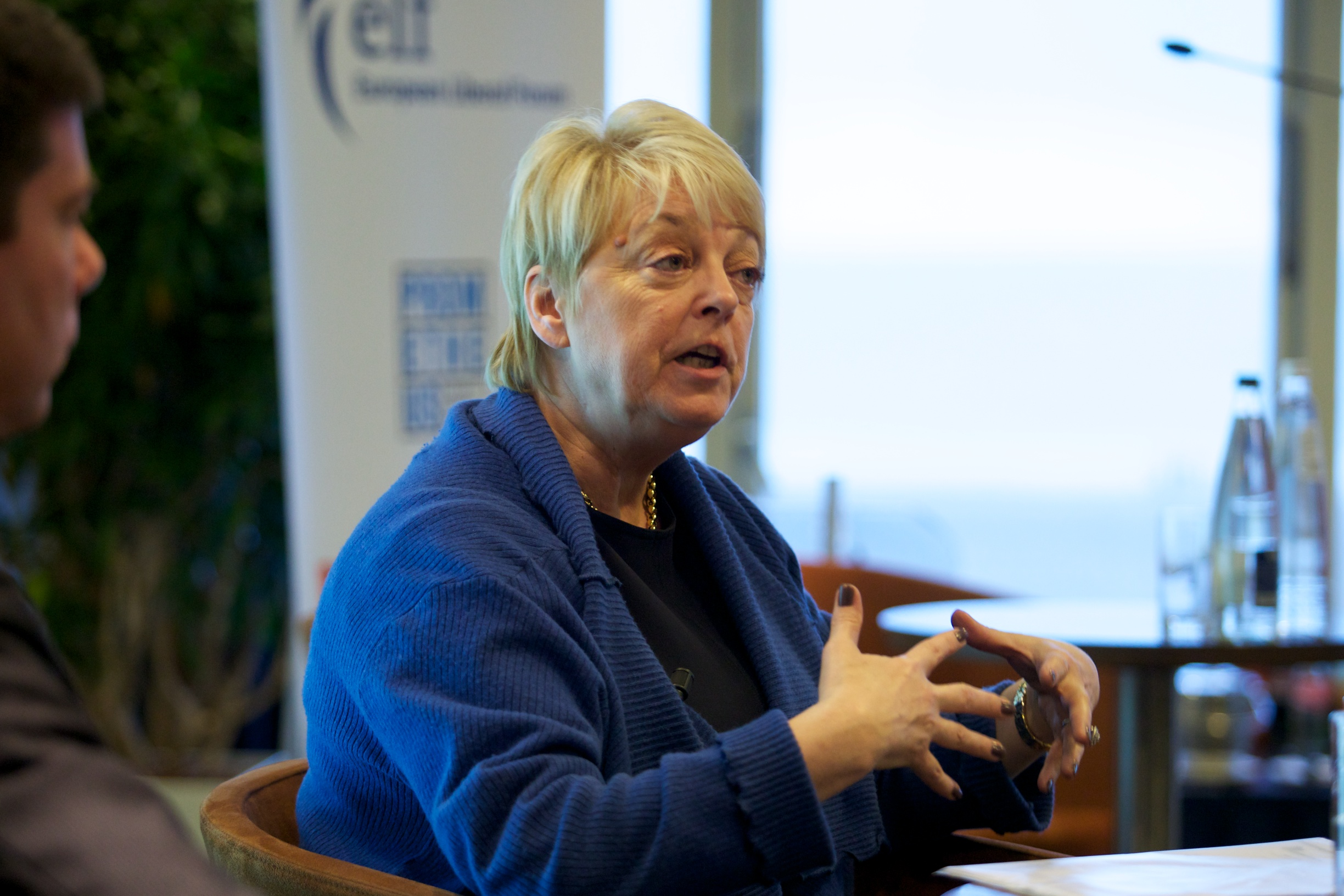

Personal details
- Born: Anne-Marie Cécile J. Uyttebroeck; 17 June 1944 (age 82) Ixelles, Belgium
- Party: Anders
- Spouse: Freddy Neyts
- Education: Free University of Brussels
- Website: annemie.eu

Anne-Marie Cécile J. "Annemie" Neyts-Uyttebroeck (Dutch pronunciation: [ˌɑnəˈmi nɛitsˈœytəbruk]; née Uyttebroeck; born 17 June 1944) is a Belgian politician and was a Member of the European Parliament for Flanders with Anders (formerly Open Flemish Liberals and Democrats), member of the Alliance of Liberals and Democrats for Europe, where she sat on the European Parliament's Committee on Foreign Affairs.

She was a third time member of the European Parliament (since June 2004), and former president of the Liberal International, from September 1999 to 2005. She was elected president of the European Liberal Democrat and Reform Party in September 2005, during a party congress in Bratislava, Slovakia.

She was a member of the Committee on Foreign Affairs and substitute for the Subcommittee on Security and Defense and a member of the Delegation for relations with NATO. She was the liberal spokesperson in the European Parliament on Foreign Affairs. She left the European Parliament on 1 January 2015.

== Education ==
- 1967: Degree in Romance philology from the Vrije Universiteit Brussel
- 1970: degree in press and communication sciences (Vrije Universiteit Brussel)
- graduate teaching qualification for secondary education (1967), (Vrije Universiteit Brussel)

== Career ==
- 1966–1973: French teacher
- 1993–1997: Held various offices, first in the PVV and then in the VLD, including PVV National Chairwoman (1985–1989) and VLD National Vice-chairwoman
- Has held various offices in Liberal International
- 1999: Chairwoman since September
- 1982–1989: Member of the Brussels City Council
- 1981–2004: Elected at various times to the national and regional parliaments (Brussels Council, the Flemish Council and the House of Representatives)
- 2001–2003: Held various government offices in the regional and national governments during that period, including Brussels Minister for Finance, the Budget, Public Office and External Relations (1999–2000) and Federal Minister attached to the Foreign Ministry, with responsibility for agriculture
- 1994–1999: Member of the European Parliament
- 1998–1999: First Vice-chairwoman of the ELDR Group
- Chairwoman of the Beursschouwburg (Théâtre de la Bourse)
- Chairwoman of the Vlaams-Nederlands Huis (Flemish-Dutch House)
- Chairwoman of the management council of the Foreign Trade Agency
- Co-chairwoman of the Committee on Intercultural Dialogue

== Decorations ==
- Officer and Commander of the Order of Leopold (Belgium)
- Knight of the Legion of Honour

Political offices
Preceded by Frits Bolkestein	President of Liberal International; 2000–2005	Succeeded by John Alderdice
