= Fawziya Rashid =

Bahraini novelist and short story writer (born 1954)

Fawziya Muhammad Rashid (born 1954) is a Bahraini novelist and short story writer.

Rashid is a native of Muharraq, and completed her secondary schooling prior to beginning her professional career. She was employed for a time in Dubai under the Ministry of Housing at the United Nations office there. She began writing fiction in 1977, first achieving notice for her work in 1983. She has since published numerous novels and volumes of short stories. Her work has been anthologized in English.
