= Fouzia Assouli =

Moroccan human rights activist

Fouzia Assouli is a Moroccan human rights activist who is a former president of the Euro-Mediterranean Women's Foundation, as well as Federation for the Democratic League of Women's Rights.

She was the recipient of the Mediterranean Foundation for Peace's 2017 Mediterranean Prize for Women. She has campaigned in Morocco and elsewhere for women's issues such as the right to divorce, individual freedoms, and literacy campaigns.
