= Socialist Party of the Island of Cuba =

The Socialist Party of the Island of Cuba (Spanish: Partido Socialista de la Isla de Cuba) was a political party in Cuba, formed in November 1906 through the merger of the Socialist Workers Party of Carlos Baliños and the International Socialist Group. The party published La Voz Obrera.
