= Oxford Manifesto =

The Oxford Manifesto, drawn up in April 1947 by representatives from 19 liberal political parties at Wadham College in Oxford, led by Salvador de Madariaga, is a document that describes the basic political principles of the Liberal International.

Fifty years on, in 1997, the Liberal International returned to Oxford and issued a supplement to the original manifesto, called The Liberal Agenda for the 21st century, describing Liberal policies in greater detail. It was adopted by the 48th Congress of Liberal International, which was held on 27–30 November 1997 in the Oxford Town Hall.

== Text ==
We, Liberals of nineteen countries assembled at Oxford at a time of disorder, poverty, famine and fear caused by two World Wars;
Convinced that this condition of the world is largely due to the abandonment of liberal principles;
Affirm our faith in this Declaration:

I
1. Man is first and foremost a being endowed with the power of independent thought and action, and with the ability to distinguish right from wrong.
2. Respect for the human person and for the family is the true basis of society.
3. The State is only the instrument of the community; it should assume no power which conflicts with the fundamental rights of the citizens and with the conditions essential for a responsible and creative life, namely:
Personal freedom, guaranteed by the independence of the administration of law and justice;
Freedom of worship and liberty of conscience;
Freedom of speech and of the press;
Freedom to associate or not to associate;
Free choice of occupation;
The opportunity of a full and varied education, according to ability and irrespective of birth or means;
The right to private ownership of property and the right to embark on individual enterprise;
Consumer's free choice and the opportunity to reap the full benefit of the productivity of the soil and the industry of man;
Security from the hazards of sickness, unemployment, disability and old age;
Equality of rights between men and women.
4. These rights and conditions can be secured only by true democracy. True democracy is inseparable from political liberty and is based on the conscious, free and enlightened consent of the majority, expressed through a free and secret ballot, with due respect for the liberties and opinions of minorities.

II
1. The suppression of economic freedom must lead to the disappearance of political freedom. We oppose such suppression, whether brought about by State ownership or control or by private monopolies, cartels and trusts. We admit State ownership only for those undertakings which are beyond the scope of private enterprise or in which competition no longer plays its part.
2. The welfare of the community must prevail and must be safeguarded from the abuse of power by sectional interests.
3. A continuous betterment of the conditions of employment, and of the housing and environment of the workers is essential. The rights, duties and interests of labour and capital are complementary; organised consultation and collaboration between employers and employed is vital to the well-being of industry.

III
Service is the necessary complement of freedom and every right involves a corresponding duty. If free institutions are to work effectively, every citizen must have a sense of moral responsibility towards his fellow men and take an active part in the affairs of the community.

IV
War can be abolished and world peace and economic prosperity restored only if all nations fulfil the following conditions:
a) Loyal adherence to a world organisation of all nations, great and small, under the same law and equity, and with power to enforce strict observance of all international obligations freely entered into;
b) Respect for the right of every nation to enjoy the essential human liberties;
c) Respect for the language, faith, laws and customs of national minorities;
d) The free exchange of ideas, news, goods and services between nations, as well as freedom of travel within and between all countries, unhampered by censorship, protective trade barriers and exchange regulations;
e) The development of the backward areas of the world, with the collaboration of their inhabitants, in their true interests and in the interests of the world at large.

We call upon all men and women who are in general agreement with these ideals and principles to join us in an endeavour to win their acceptance throughout the world.
