= Fawzia Saeed Hai =

Pakistani model (1942–1968)

- فوزیہ سعید حی
- Born: Fawzia Zahiruddin Babar; 14 July 1942; Shimla, British Raj, British India
- Died: 23 June 1968 (aged 25); Philadelphia, United States
- Other names: First Lux Lady of Pakistan; Lux Lady; Fouzia Hai; Fouzia Saeed Hai
- Occupation: Model
- Years active: 1956–1968
- Spouse: Khwaja Saeed Hai (m. 1960; died 1968) (husband)
- Children: 4
- Parent(s): Sahibzada Mirza Zahiruddin Babar (father); Qamar Begum (mother)
- Relatives: Raju Jamil (cousin)

Fawzia Saeed Hai (Urdu: فوزیہ سعید حی; July 14 1942 – 23 June 1968) was a prominent Pakistani model in the mid 1950s and 1960s, widely celebrated as the country's first "Lux Lady". Considered the leading female model of her era, her career was noted for defining the image of beauty and grace in early Pakistani media.

== Early life ==
Fawzia Saeed Hai was born on July 14, 1942, in Shimla, British India. She hailed from the educated and sophisticated Loharu family, a former princely state family. Her father was Sahibzada Mirza Zahiruddin Babar and her mother was Qamar Begum.

== Career ==
Fawzia began her modeling career at a young age, becoming the first model to be featured in the popular Lux soap advertisements in Pakistan when she was just 16 years old. Her face quickly became synonymous with the brand, and her image was featured prominently on billboards across the country.

A notable moment in her career occurred during Queen Elizabeth II's royal visit to Pakistan in January 1961. Fawzia was one of the models selected to participate in a special fashion show arranged for Her Majesty, which showcased "fine dresses of the region". The event was a high-profile diplomatic affair.

She was highly sought after for numerous press and media modeling campaigns and was the face of several major consumer brands in the 1960s, including Lux, Dalda, Jan-e-Saba Soap, Bano Banaspati, Tullo and Dew.

== Personal life ==
She married Pakistan's ace tennis champion, Khwaja Saeed Hai, in the 1960. They remained married until her death and had four children together: three daughters and one son.

== Illness and death ==
Fawzia Saeed Hai died suddenly on June 23, 1968, in Philadelphia, United States, just three weeks shy of her 26th birthday. She died while swimming at a friend's house in Philadelphia. She suffered an asthma attack while in the pool and drowned. She died due to aneurysm which occurred while she was swimming.

== Tribute ==
Fawzia's close friend poet Taufiq Rafat, a close family friend, wrote a poem titled "Poem for Fawzia" in her memory.

== Public image ==
Hai was known for her serene beauty, grace, and elegant, sophisticated persona, which made her a "darling" of the public and press.
