= Fouzia Hameed =

Pakistani politician

Member of the National Assembly of Pakistan
- In office 4 August 2014 – 31 May 2018
- Constituency: Reserved seat for women

Personal details
- Party: MQM-P (2023-present)
- Other political affiliations: PSP (2018–2023); MQM-L (2014-2018)

Fouzia Hameed (Urdu: فوزیہ حمید) is a Pakistani politician who had been a member of the National Assembly of Pakistan, from August 2014 to May 2018. Member of Sindh Assembly (MPA 2024- date)

== Political career ==
She was elected to the National Assembly of Pakistan as a candidate of Muttahida Qaumi Movement on a reserved seat for women from Sindh in the 2013 Pakistani general election.

In March 2018, she quit MQM and joined Pak Sarzameen Party (PSP).
