= People's Labour Party (Cuba) =

Defunct political party in Cuba

People's Labour Party Partido Popular Obrero
- Founded: 1901

The People's Labour Party (Spanish: Partido Popular Obrero) was a short-lived political party in Cuba. It appeared in public with its programme in August 1901. The party was a continuation of the People's Party of Diego Vicente Tejera. However, it appears that Diego Vicente Tejera had no links to the People's Labour Party.

== Overview ==
The statues and programmes of the party were edited by a commission consisting of Cristóbal de la Guardia, Joaquín Alba and Manuel Cendoya. It raised demands such as 8-hour working day, racial equality and the right to form trade unions. However the party failed to make any significant political breakthrough.

The party decided to support the presidential candidature of Bartolomé Masó in the 1901 elections.
