= Jorge Valls =

Cuban activist and poet

Jorge Valls Arango (February 2, 1933 – October 22, 2015) was a Cuban activist and poet of who spent more than two decades in prison for his opposition to Fidel Castro.

He was born in Mañanan, now part of Havana. He was the son of a Catalan father and Cuban mother, and could read and write Catalan. He was first arrested in 1952 while a student at the Faculty of Philosophy and Letters of the University of Havana, when he demonstrated his opposition to the 1952 Batista coup d'état. Valls was sentenced to a year in prison on July 22, 1955, for possession of a pipe bomb. University of Havana Chancellor Clemente Inclán persuaded Batista to quickly pardon him. In 1956, he joined the Directorio Revolucionario Estudiantil, a student group fighting the new regime. During the trial of Batista police informant Marcos Rodríguez in 1964, Valls was denounced for having been "a known anti-Communist" in the University of Havana "who demanded that the Directorio Revolucionario Estudiantil be an anti-Communist organization, and that Jorge Valls pronounced for the expulsion of Communist students from the university struggles." He was later a Christian socialist.

He was arrested in April 1964 after testifying on behalf of Batista police informant Marcos Rodríguez, with whom he had "a great friendship" and "a great affinity" between 1955 and 1959. The prosecutor accused Valls of "not being a revolutionary," of "defending" Rodríguez and "believing that he is innocent." He spent more than 20 years behind bars in many Cuban prisons and was released in 1984. After his release, he moved to Miami, Florida where in 1986, he wrote a book Twenty Years and Forty Days: Life in a Cuban Prison, in which he speaks about his experiences behind bars. He also published a couple of poem books in Spanish including Donde estoy no hay luz y está enrejado. He was the international secretary of the Democratic Social-Revolutionary Party of Cuba.

He died of cancer in 2015.
