= Fevzi Mostari =

Ottoman-Bosnian writer (c. 1675–1747)

- Born: c. 1675; Blagaj (near Mostar), Sanjak of Herzegovina, Bosnia Eyalet, Ottoman Empire
- Died: 1747
- Occupation: Writer
- Writing career
- Notable work: Bulbulistan

Fevzi Mostari (also spelled Fawzi or Fowzi, and also known as Fevzi Mostarac; c. 1675–1747) was a Bosnian writer, who authored the Persian work Bulbulistan ("A Place of Nightingales"; also spelled Bolbolestān) in 1739. Written in imitation of the Golestan of Saadi Shirazi (died 1291/2), it is the only extant prose work in Persian by a writer of Bosnian origin. It is viewed as an important artifact of the Bosnian literary tradition. He was born in Blagaj, near Mostar.

He became a member of the Sufi Mevlevi Order during his time in Constantinople.

== Bibliography ==
- Algar, Hamid (1994). "PERSIAN LITERATURE IN BOSNIA-HERZEGOVINA^{1}". Journal of Islamic Studies. 5 (2): 254–267. doi:10.1093/jis/5.2.254. JSTOR 26195619.
- Algar, Hamid (1999). "FEVZİ MOSTĀRĪ". In Yarshater, Ehsan (ed.). Encyclopædia Iranica. Vol. IX/6: Festivals VIII–Fish. London and New York: Routledge & Kegan Paul. pp. 571–572. ISBN 978-0-933273-34-4.
- Algar, Hamid (2003). "BOSNIA AND HERZEGOVINA". In Yarshater, Ehsan (ed.). Encyclopædia Iranica (Online ed.). Encyclopædia Iranica Foundation.
- Gačanin, Sabaheta (2022). "The Persian Literary Tradition in Ottoman Bosnia and Its Environs". Journal of Persianate Studies. 15 (1): 85–120. doi:10.1163/18747167-bja10027.
