= Fawzia Assaad =

Egyptian novelist (1929–2023)

Fawzia Assaad (Egyptian Arabic: فوزيه اسعد; 17 July 1929 – 2 October 2023) was an Egyptian novelist who wrote in French.

== Life and career ==
Fawzia Assaad was born in Cairo on 17 July 1929. Educated at French schools, she gained a doctorate in philosophy in Paris. Her autombiographical novel L'Égyptienne (1975) portrays the effects of the 1952 Egyptian revolution and the Arab–Israeli conflict on an Egyptian Coptic woman. Assaad died on 2 October 2023, at the age of 94.

== Works ==
- L'Égyptienne: roman. Paris: Mercure de France, 1975. Translated into English as Layla, an Egyptian woman, Trenton, NJ: The Red Sea Press, 2004.
- Préfigurations égyptiennes de la pensée de Nietzsche : essai philosophique. Laussane: L'Age d'homme, 1986.
- Des enfants et des chats. Lausanne: P.-M. Favre, 1987.
- La grande maison de Louxor: roman. Paris: L'Harmattan, 1992.
- Hatshepsout, femme pharaon: biographie mythique. Paris: Librairie Orientaliste Paul Geuthner. With a preface by Michel Butor.
- Hatshepsout, Akhenaton, Néfertiti: pharaons hérétiques. Paris : Geuthner, impr. 2007
- Préfigurations égyptiennes des dogmes chrétiens. Paris: Geuthner, 2013.
