= Fevzi Pasha (disambiguation) =

Fevzi Pasha may refer to:

- Ahmet Fevzi Big or Big Ahmed Fevzi Pasha (1871–1947), Ottoman general
- Mustafa Fevzi Çakmak or Mustafa Fevzi Pasha (1876–1950), Turkish field marshal and prime minister
- Ahmed Fevzi Pasha (d. 1842), Ottoman admiral and Kapudan Pasha 1836–1839
- Küçük Ömer Fevzi Pasha, ruler of Crete 1868–1870 and 1871–1872
