= Socialist Party of Manzanillo =

- Leader: Agustín Martín Vélez
- Founded: 1906
- Ideology: Marxism; Socialism
- Political position: Left-wing

The Socialist Party of the Manzanillo (Spanish: Partido Socialista de Manzanillo) was a political party in Manzanillo, Cuba, formed in 1906. Agustín Martín Vélez, a tobacco worker and former anarchist, was the leader of the party. The party was Marxist in its orientation and was active in leading the Federación Obrera de Manzanillo trade union movement. Some of the leaders of the party later became active in the Communist Party of Cuba.
