= Faouzia Mebarki =

Algerian ambassador (born 1959)

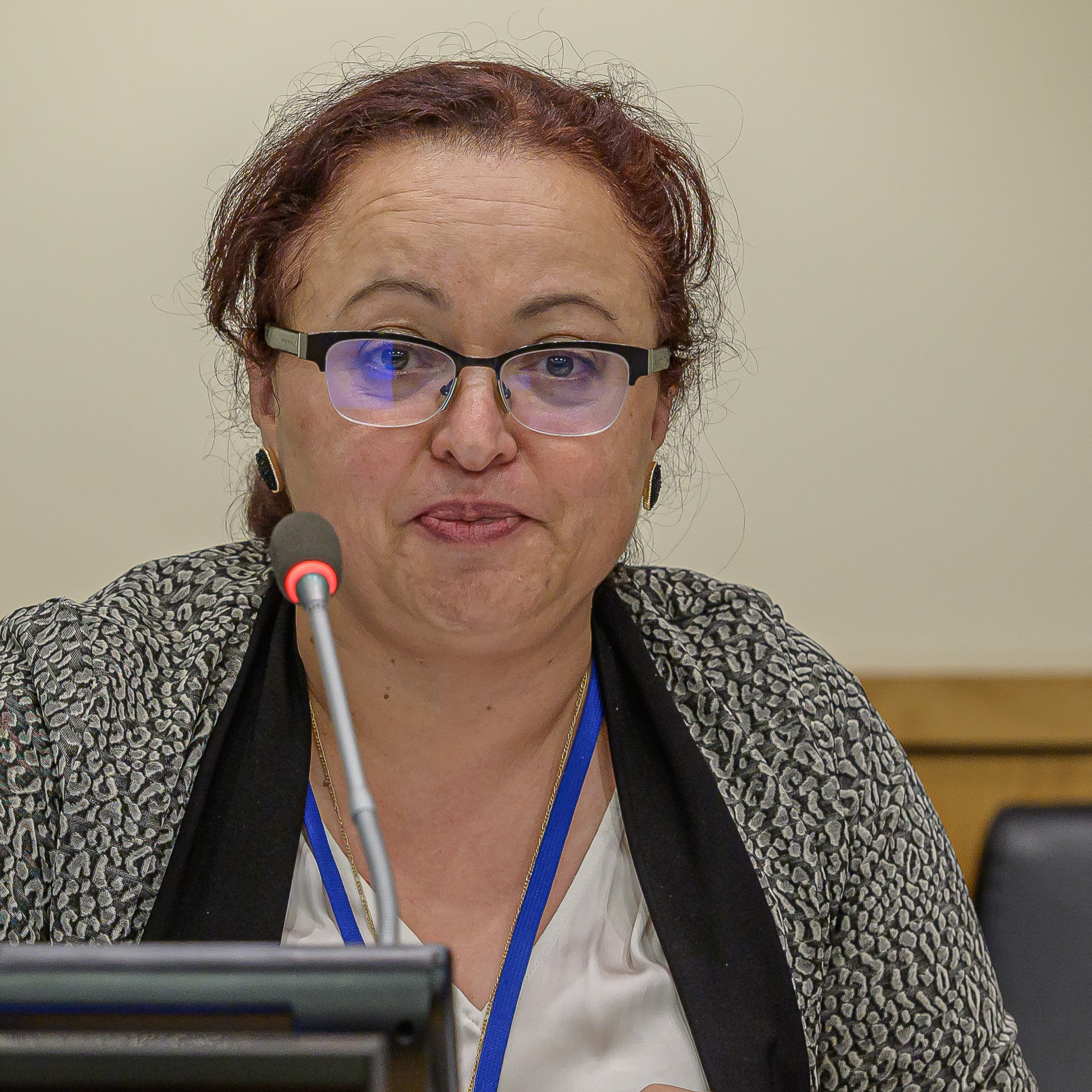
- Born: June 7, 1959 (age 66); Annaba, Algeria
- Occupation: Ambassador
- Known for: Algerian Ambassador
- Spouse: Ahmed Mebarki
- Children: one

Faouzia Mebarki (born June 7, 1959) is the Algerian ambassador to Austria and Slovakia. She was appointed in 2016 and she is based in Vienna where she represents Algeria at the other international organisations (including UNODC, UNIDO, CTBT, IAEA, OPEC, OFID, OSCE) that are based in that city.

== Biography ==
Mebarki was born in Annaba, Algeria, in 1959. In 1977 she gained a Baccalaureate in her home city at the Saint Augustine Secondary School. Three years later she left the École nationale d'administration (Algérie) in Hydra after taking Diplomatic Studies. Mebarki joined the Algerian Ministry of Foreign Affairs and she went to work in the head office for central Europe. In 2001 she was promoted to be a deputy director looking after "Social and Cultural Affairs" and then information and analysis.

In 2003 Mebarki went to Caracas where she studied ceremonial studies at the Pedro Gual Institute of Diplomatic Studies.

In 2010 she was in Belgium at the Algerian Embassy in Brussels where she was responsible for diplomatic relations with the European parliament.

Mebarki was appointed to be the Algerian Ambassador Extraordinary and Plenipotentiary to Austria and Slovakia on 24 May 2006. In 2016 she presented her credentials as Algeria's representative to the United Nations to the Director General Yury Fedotov in Vienna.

Mebarji sat as Algeria's representative at the Organization for Security and Co-operation in Europe in 2020 (OSCE). She was Chair of the negotiations for the first global treaty against cybercrime, the UN Cybercrime Convention.

Mebarji chaired the 55th session of the Comprehensive Nuclear-Test-Ban Treaty Organization (CTBTO) in December 2020.

== Private life ==
Mebarki is married to Ahmed Mebarki and they have a son.
