= Socialist Workers Party (Cuba) =

Defunct political party in Cuba

The Socialist Workers Party (Spanish: Partido Obrero Socialista, POS), initially known as the Workers Party of Cuba (Spanish: Partido Obrero de Cuba), was a political party in Cuba. The party published La Voz Obrera. It was founded by a group of workers in Havana in 1904. In the party was joined by Carlos Baliños, who had formed the Socialist Propaganda Club 1903. Baliños became the leading figure of the party, and the name was changed to POS. The party also adopted a socialist programme. In November 1906 POS merged with the International Socialist Group, forming the Socialist Party of the Island of Cuba. La Voz Obrera was taken over by the new party as its organ.
