= Cuban Socialist Party =

The Cuban Socialist Party (Spanish: Partido Socialista Cubano) was a political party in Cuba. The party was founded in March 1899 by Diego Vicente Tejera. The founding of the Socialist Party represented the first attempt in Cuban history to build a political party representing the working class.

The activities of the party were limited to the city of Havana. The party was dissolved in July 1899, and Tejera joined the Cuban National Party.
