= Liberal International =

International federation of liberal political parties

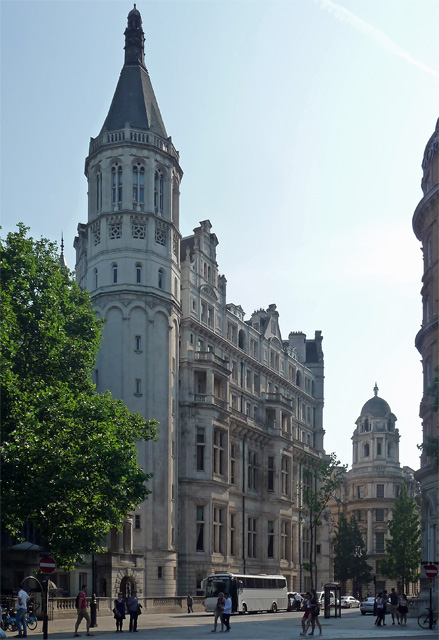
- Headquarters of Liberal International, London
- Abbreviation: LI
- Formation: 21 November 1946; 79 years ago (In April 1947, it was constituted with the Oxford Manifesto)
- Type: International non-governmental organisation
- Legal status: Political international
- Purpose: World federation of liberal political parties and organisations
- Headquarters: National Liberal Club
- Location(s): London, SW1A; United Kingdom
- Region served: Worldwide
- Members: 90 political parties and 21 international organisations (as of May 2022)
- President: Karl-Heinz Paque
- Vice-Presidents: Henrik Bach Mortensen; Sidi Touré; Dr. Phil Bennion (fmr. MEP)
- Secretary General: William Townsend
- Main organ: Congress of Liberal International
- Publication: LI Human Rights Bulletin
- Website: liberal-international.org

Liberal International (LI) is a worldwide organisation of liberal political parties. The political international was formed in November 1946, and constituted with the Oxford Manifesto in April 1947. It has become the pre-eminent network for liberal and progressive democratic parties aiming to strengthen liberalism and democratic values around the world. Its headquarters are within the National Liberal Club, in London. The Oxford Manifesto describes the basic political principles of the Liberal International, which is currently made up of 111 parties and organisations.

== Aims ==
The Liberal International Constitution (2005) gives its purposes as:

to win general acceptance of Liberal principles which are international in their nature throughout the world, and to foster the growth of a free society based on personal liberty, personal responsibility and social justice, and to provide the means of co-operation and interchange of information between the member organisations, and between men and women of all countries who accept these principles.

The principles that unite member parties from Africa, America, Asia and Europe are respect for human rights, free and fair elections and multi-party democracy, social justice, tolerance, market economy, free trade, environmental sustainability and a strong sense of international solidarity.

The aims of the Liberal International are also set out in a series of seven manifestos, written between 1946 and 1997, and are furthered by a variety of bodies including a near-yearly conference for liberal parties and individuals from around the world.

== Bureau ==
The bureau of Liberal International is elected every 18 months by the delegates of the congress.

Former Presidents include Hans Van Baalen MEP, John, Lord Alderdice, Dutch politician and former European Commissioner Frits Bolkestein, German politician Otto Graf Lambsdorff, and Spain's first democratically elected prime minister after Francoist Spain, Adolfo Suárez. The 14th president of Liberal International was Hakima el Haite of the Mouvement Populaire (Morocco), who is a former Minister of Environment, UN climate champion, and climate scientist. Madam El Haite succeeded Dr Juli Minoves, formerly Andorra's foreign minister and representative to the United Nations.

The secretary-general of Liberal International is William Townsend. Other members of the bureau include Deputy President Prof. Karl-Heinz Paque; and Vice Presidents Cellou Dalein Diallo (Guinea), Kitty Monterrey (Nicaragua), Abir al-Sahlani (Sweden), Kiat Sittheamorn (Thailand) and Robert Woodthorpe Browne (United Kingdom). There are two elected treasurers, Judith Pallares MP (Andorra) and Minister Omar Youm (Senegal).

== Awards ==
Liberal International awards prizes to individuals in the areas of human rights and liberalism.

Prize for Freedom:

The Liberal International Prize for Freedom is LI's most prestigious human rights award. Conveyed annually since 1984 to an individual of liberal conviction who has made outstanding efforts for the defence of freedom and human rights, recipients include Maria Corina Machado of Venezuela, Senator Leila de Lima of the Philippines, Raif Badawi of Saudi Arabia, Waris Dirie of Somalia and Václav Havel of Czechoslovakia and the Czech Republic.

Medal of Liberalism:

The Liberal International Medal of Liberalism is awarded to individuals who have worked to advance liberal values on a local, national and international level. Recipients include President Alassane Ouattara of Ivory Coast, Prime Minister Xavier Bettel of Luxembourg, President Tsai Ing-wen of Taiwan and Alliance of Liberals and Democrats for Europe leader Sir Graham Watson of the United Kingdom.

== Publications ==
The LI Human Rights Bulletin is published three times per year and consists of opinion articles, video interviews and digest of the work of the LI human rights committee.

Thematic publications are published online and in print on an ad hoc basis. Recent texts have offered a liberal perspective on issues ranging from freedom of belief to the responsibility to protect.

== History ==
=== Before establishment ===
Because inter-war International Entente of Radical and Similar Democratic Parties ceased to operate in the beginning of the World War II, on 16 June 1946 representatives of the Liberal Party of Belgium, British Liberal Party, French Republican, Radical and Radical-Socialist Party, Danish Social Liberal Party, Freedom Party of the Netherlands, Free Democratic Party of Switzerland, People's Party of Sweden, Italian Liberal Party and the representatives of Spanish Liberals in exile assembled in Brussels and adopted the Declaration of Brussels, which called for creation of world liberal organisation.

=== Oxford Manifesto ===
The Oxford Manifesto, drawn up in April 1947 at Wadham College in Oxford by representatives from 19 liberal political parties from South Africa, Germany, Austria, Belgium, Canada, Cyprus, Spain, Estonia, United Kingdom, United States, Finland, France, Hungary, Italy, Norway, Sweden, Switzerland, Czechoslovakia and Turkey is a document describing the basic political principles of the Liberal International. Creation of its main principles were led by Salvador de Madariaga.

The Oxford Manifesto was inspired by the ideas of William Beveridge and is regarded as one of the defining political documents of the 20th century.

Fifty years on, in 1997, Liberal International returned to Oxford and issued a supplement to the original manifesto, The Liberal Agenda for the 21st century, describing Liberal policies in greater detail. The second Oxford Manifesto was adopted by the 48th Congress of Liberal International, which was held on 27–30 November 1997 in the Oxford Town Hall. In 2017, the global federation marked its 70th anniversary with the adoption of the Andorra Liberal Manifesto for the twenty-first century (ALM). A three-year project across numerous continents initiated by then president Juli Minoves, the ALM embodied the widest consultation of views undertaken by Liberal International in order to compile a policy document.

== Organisation ==
=== Presidents ===
N°	Portrait	Name (Birth–Death)	Country	Presidency		Membership
1		Salvador de Madariaga (1886–1978)	United Kingdom; Spain (exiled)	20 April 1948	18 April 1952	Association; Mont Pelerin Society
2		Roger Motz (1904–1964)	Belgium	18 April 1952	20 April 1958	Liberal Party
3		Giovanni Malagodi (1904–1991)	Italy	20 April 1958	15 April 1966	Italian Liberal Party
4		Edzo Toxopeus (1918–2009)	Netherlands	15 April 1966	25 April 1970	People's Party for Freedom and Democracy
5		Gaston Thorn (1928–2007)	Luxembourg	25 April 1970	18 April 1982	Democratic Party
(3)		Giovanni Malagodi (1904–1991)	Italy	18 April 1982	26 April 1989	Italian Liberal Party
6		Adolfo Suárez (1932–2014)	Spain	26 April 1989	22 April 1992	Democratic and Social Centre
7		Otto Graf Lambsdorff (1926–2009)	Germany	22 April 1992	25 April 1994	Free Democratic Party
8		David Steel (1938–)	United Kingdom	25 April 1994	15 April 1996	Liberal Democrats
9		Frits Bolkestein (1933–2025)	Netherlands	15 April 1996	18 April 2000	People's Party for Freedom and Democracy
10		Annemie Neyts-Uyttebroeck (1944–)	Belgium	18 April 2000	25 April 2005	Open Vlaamse Liberalen en Democraten
11		John Alderdice, Baron Alderdice (1955–)	United Kingdom	25 April 2005	20 April 2009	Liberal Democrats and Alliance Party of Northern Ireland
12		Hans van Baalen (1960–2021)	Netherlands	20 April 2009	26 April 2014	People's Party for Freedom and Democracy
13		Juli Minoves (1969–)	Andorra	26 April 2014	30 November 2018	Liberal Party of Andorra
14		Hakima El Haite (1963–)	Morocco	30 November 2018	2 December 2024	Popular Movement
15		Karl-Heinz Paqué (1956–)	Germany	2 December 2024	Incumbent	Free Democratic Party

== Members ==
=== Incumbent heads of state and government ===
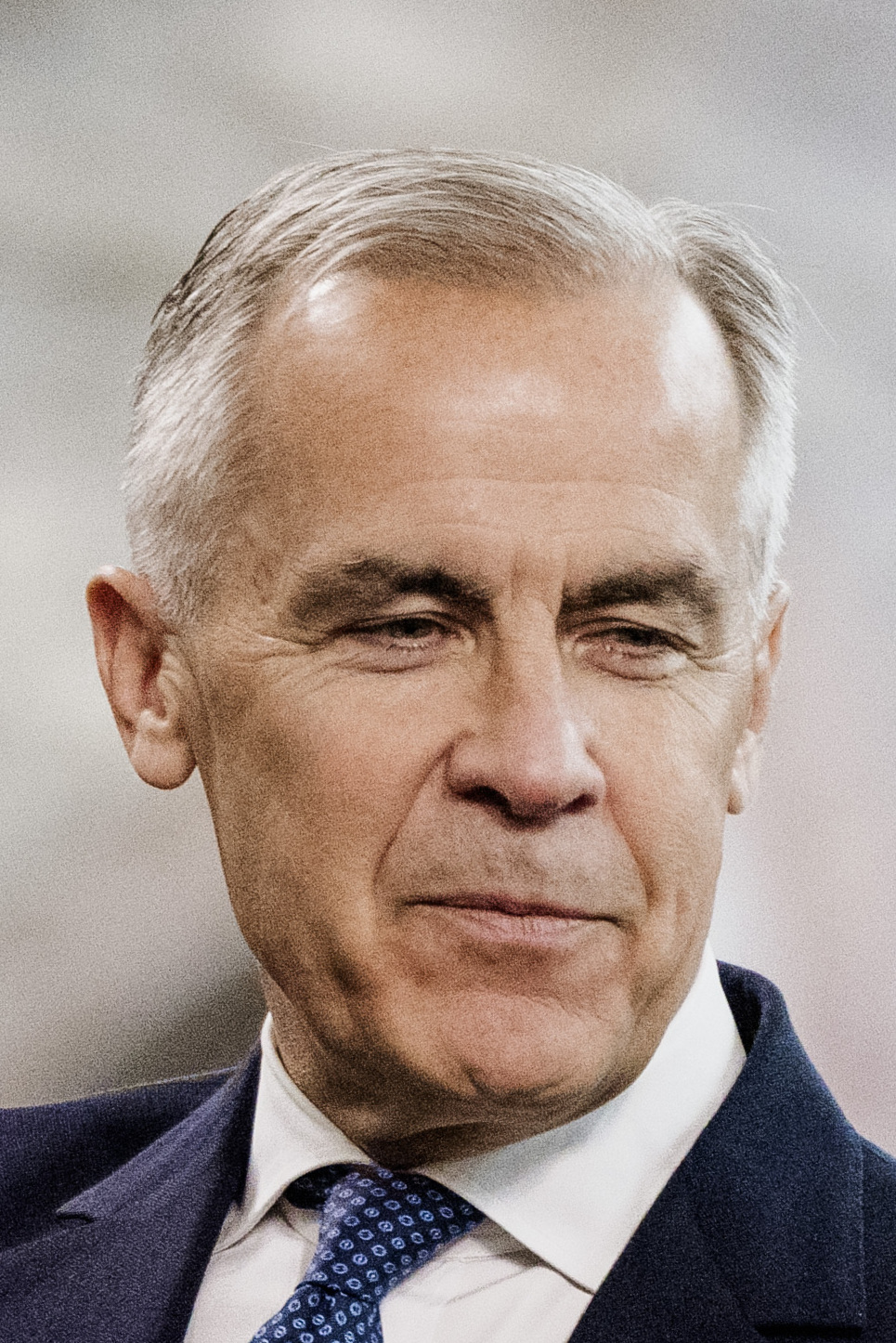
Mark Carney
Canada

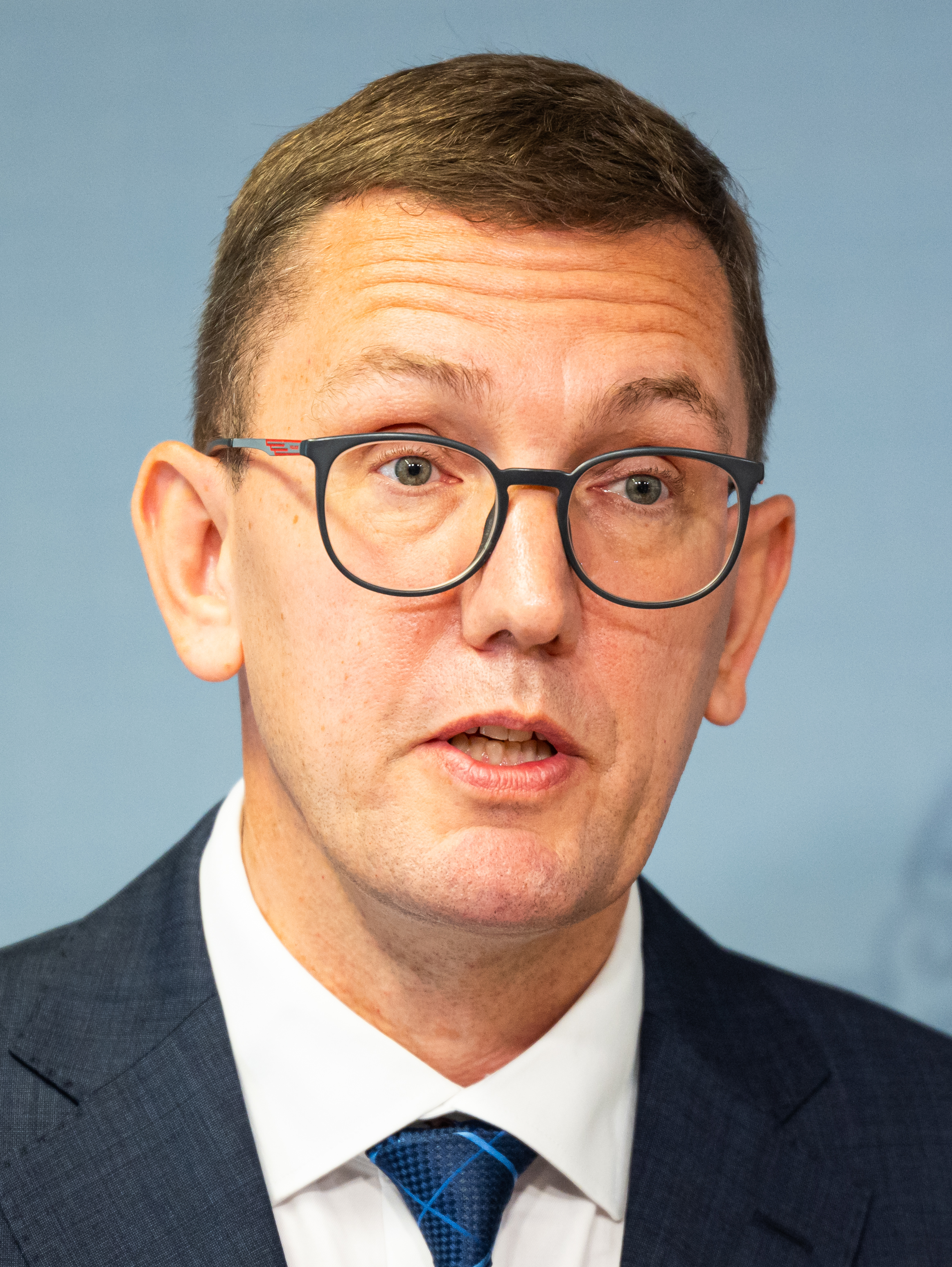
Kristen Michal
Estonia

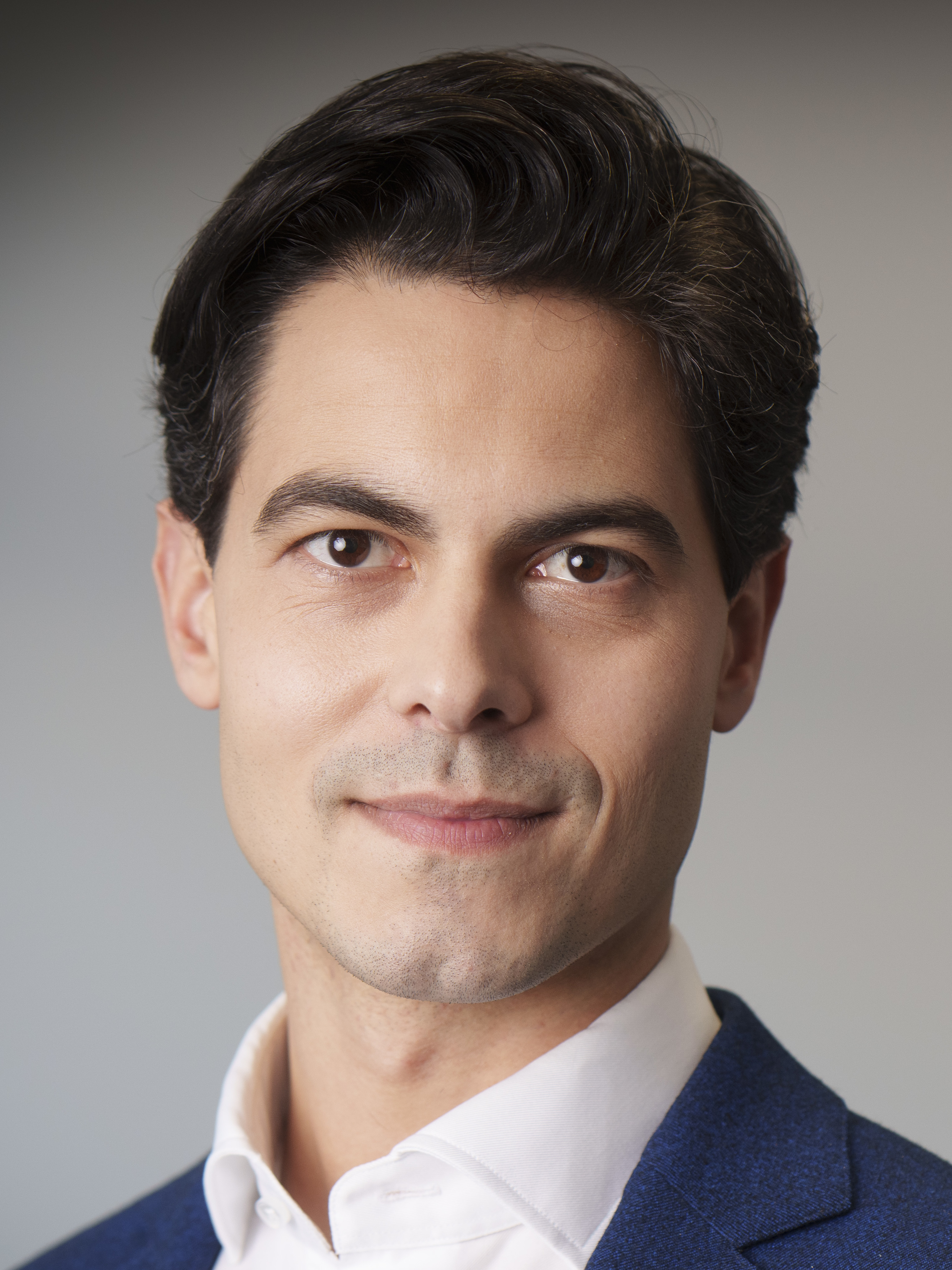
Rob Jetten
Netherlands

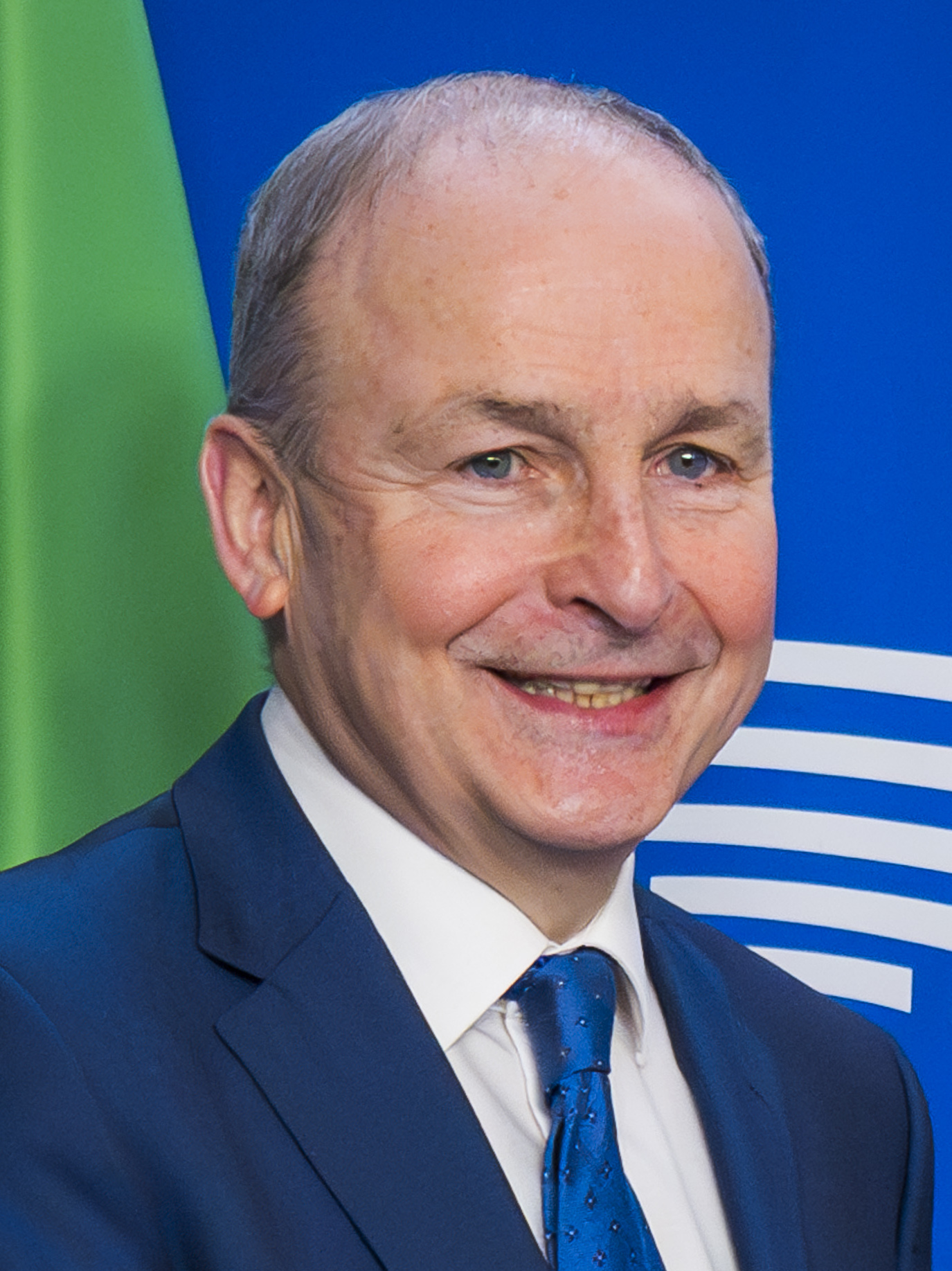
Micheál Martin
Ireland

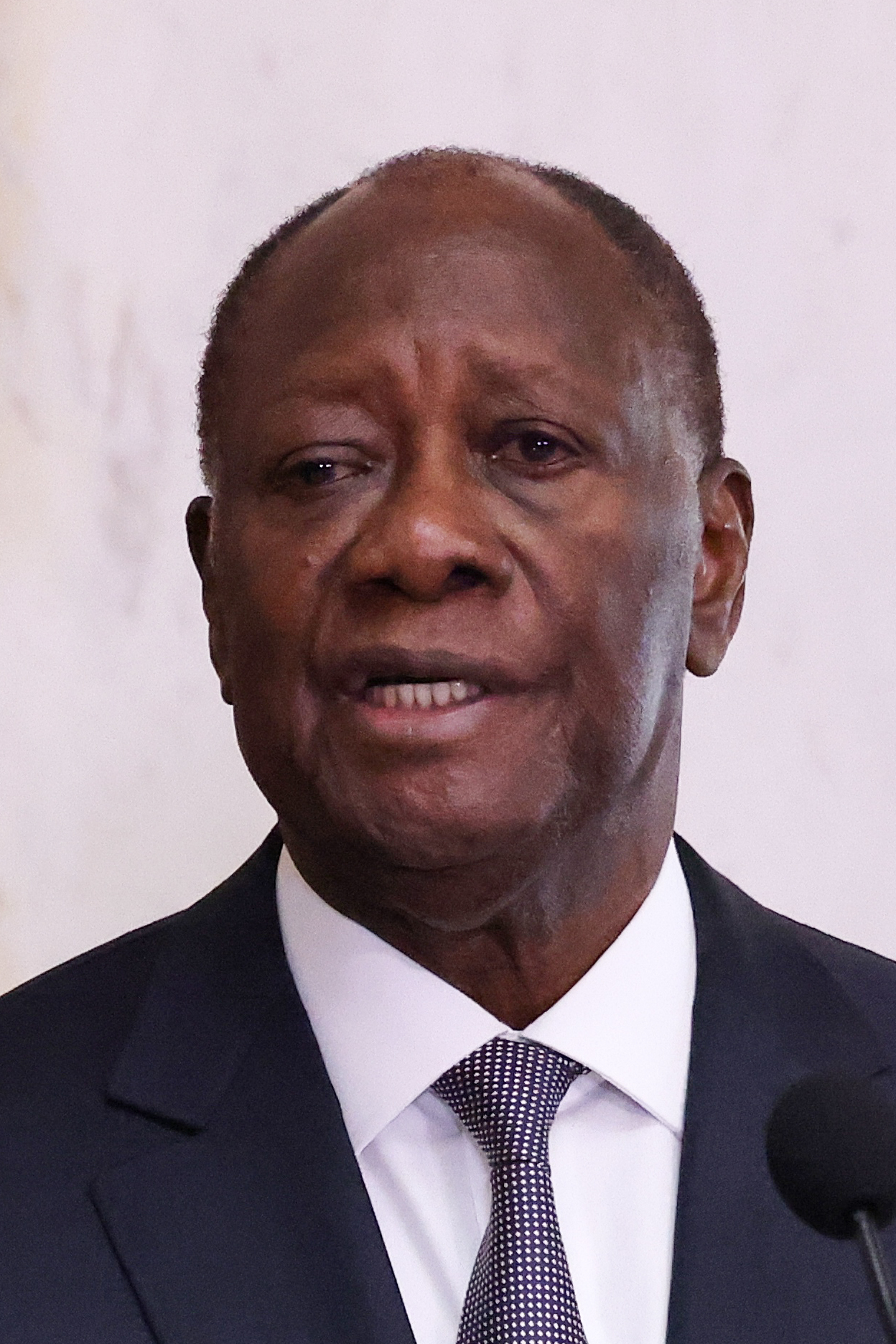
Alassane Ouattara
Ivory Coast

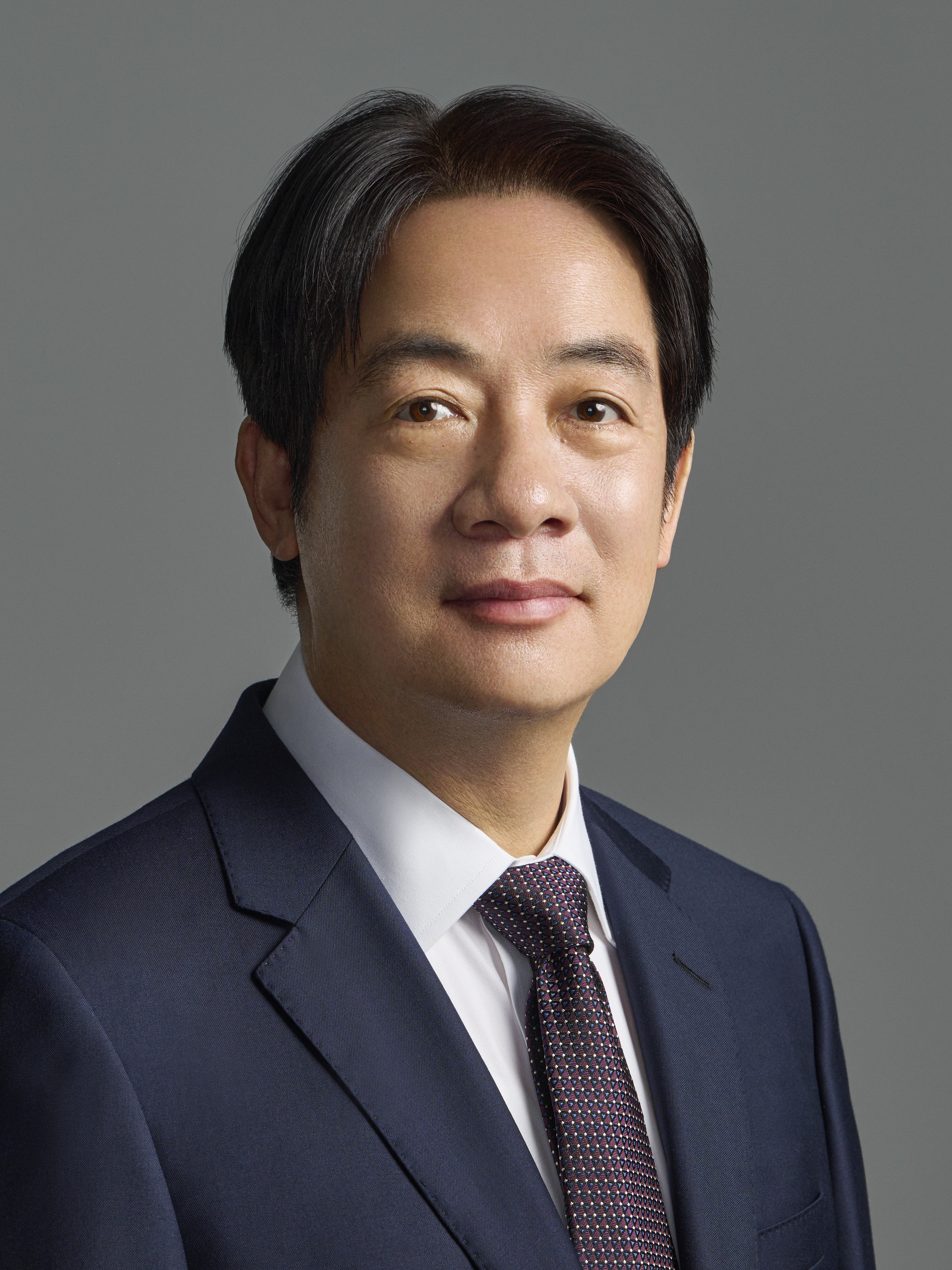
Lai Ching-te
Taiwan

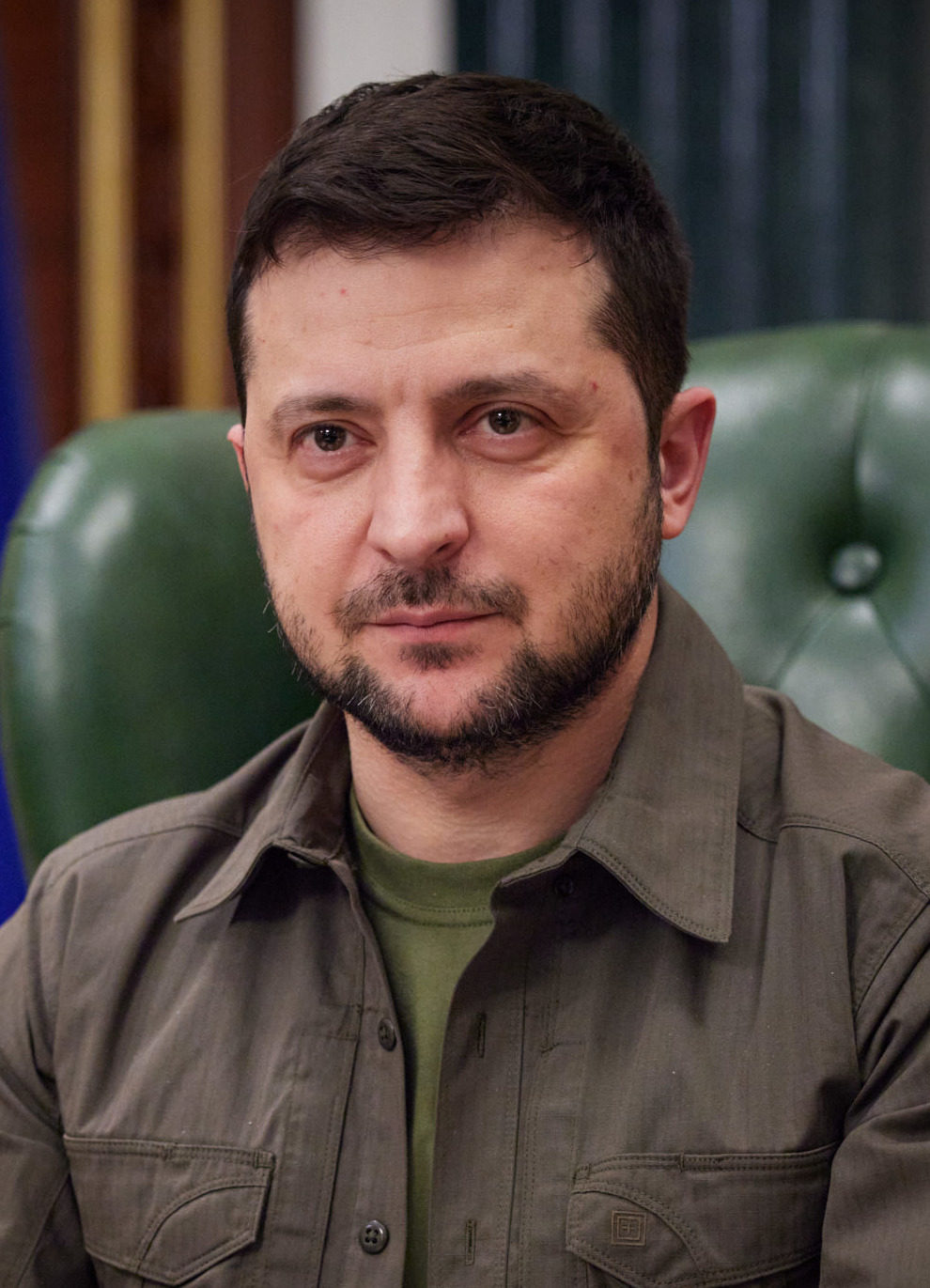
Volodymyr Zelenskyy Ukraine

=== Full members ===
Country/Region	Name	Government	Legislature (or lower house)	Joined	
Andorra	Liberals of Andorra	Extra-parliamentary	0 / 28		
Austria	NEOS	Government	18 / 183	2025	
Belgium	Reform Movement	Government	20 / 150	2002	
Belgium	Anders	Opposition	8 / 150	1992	
Burkina Faso	Alliance for Democracy and Federation – African Democratic Rally	Extra-parliamentary	0 / 127	2006	
Burkina Faso	Le Faso Autrement	Opposition	1 / 127		
Cambodia	Cambodia National Rescue Movement	Extra-parliamentary		2006	
Canada	Liberal Party of Canada	Government	174 / 343	1947	
Chile	Evópoli	Government	2 / 155	2023	
Chile	Liberal Party of Chile	Opposition	3 / 155	2014	
Democratic Republic of the Congo	Together for the Republic	Opposition	18 / 500	2008	
Ivory Coast	Rally of Houphouëtists for Democracy and Peace	Government	197 / 255	2003	
Croatia	Istrian Democratic Assembly	Opposition	2 / 151	2014	
Cuba	Cuban Liberal Union	Extra-parliamentary		1992	
Cuba	Cuban Liberal Solidarity Party	Extra-parliamentary		2014	
Cuba	Democratic Solidarity Party	Extra-parliamentary			
Egypt	Justice Party	Opposition	11 / 596		
Gambia	Citizens' Alliance				
Denmark	Danish Social Liberal Party	Opposition	7 / 179	1948	
Denmark	Venstre, Denmark's Liberal Party	Government	23 / 179	1947	
Denmark	Moderates		16 / 179		
Estonia	Estonian Reform Party	Government	37 / 101	1994	
EU	Renew Europe	—N/a	78 / 720		
EU	ALDE Party	—N/a			
Finland	Centre Party	Opposition	23 / 200	1983	
Finland	Swedish People's Party	Government	9 / 200	1983	
Georgia	Republican Party of Georgia	Extra-parliamentary		2006	
Germany	German Group of the LI	—N/a		1947	
Germany	Free Democratic Party	Extra-parliamentary		1947	
Gibraltar	Liberal Party	Government	2 / 17	1997	
Guinea	Union of Democratic Forces of Guinea	Extra-parliamentary		2012	
Guinea	Union of Republican Forces	Opposition	10 / 114	2012	
Honduras	Liberal Party	Opposition	41 / 128	1986	
Iceland	Progressive Party	Opposition	5 / 63	1983	
Ireland	Fianna Fáil	Government	48 / 174	2014	
Israel	Israeli Liberal Group	Opposition			
Kenya	Orange Democratic Movement	Opposition	85 / 349	2015	
Kosovo	Independent Liberal Party	Extra-parliamentary		2009	
Kosovo	Democratic Party of Kosovo	Opposition	22 / 120	2023	
Lebanon	Future Movement	Extra-parliamentary		2012	
Luxembourg	Democratic Party	Government	14 / 60		
Madagascar	Movement for the Progress of Madagascar	Extra-parliamentary		1994	
Madagascar	Arche de la Nation	Extra-parliamentary		2017	
Mexico	New Alliance Party	Opposition		2006	
Mongolia	Civil Will-Green Party	Opposition	4 / 126	2009	
Montenegro	Liberal Party of Montenegro	Extra-parliamentary		2014	
Morocco	Constitutional Union	Government	18 / 395	2003	
Morocco	Authenticity and Modernity Party	Government	97 / 395		
Morocco	Popular Movement	Opposition	28 / 395		
Netherlands	Democrats 66	Government	26 / 150	1986	
Netherlands	People's Party for Freedom and Democracy	Government	22 / 150	1960	
Nicaragua	Ciudadanos por la Libertad	Opposition			
North Macedonia	Liberal Democratic Party	Opposition	1 / 120	1994	
Norway	Liberal Party	Opposition	3 / 169	1947	
Paraguay	Authentic Radical Liberal Party	Opposition	23 / 80	2001	
Philippines	Liberal Party	Opposition	12 / 317	1989	
Portugal	Iniciativa Liberal	Opposition	9 / 230		
Romania	National Liberal Party	Government	49 / 331	1994	
Senegal	Alliance pour la République	Opposition	16 / 165	2018	
Senegal	Rewmi	Extra-parliamentary		2015	
Senegal	Senegalese Democratic Party	Extra-parliamentary		1980	
Slovenia	Concretely	Extra-parliamentary			
Somalia	CAHDI Party	Opposition		2017	
South Africa	Democratic Alliance	Government	87 / 400	1984	
Spain	Fundació Llibertat i Democràcia	—N/a			
Sweden	Liberals	Government	16 / 349	1947	
Sweden	Centre Party	Opposition	24 / 349	2006	
Serbia	Movement of Free Citizens	Opposition	3 / 250	2022	
Switzerland	FDP.The Liberals	Government	28 / 200	2009	
Syria	Syrian Liberal Party - Ahrar	Opposition			
Taiwan	Democratic Progressive Party	Government	51 / 113	1994	
Thailand	Democrat Party	Opposition	21 / 500		
United Kingdom	Alliance Party of Northern Ireland	In coalition government in Northern Irish Assembly, in opposition at national level		1991	
United Kingdom	Liberal International British Group	—N/a			
United Kingdom	Liberal Democrats	Opposition	72 / 650	1989	
Ukraine	Servant of the People		Government (under martial law)	228 / 450	2026
Worldwide	International Federation of Liberal Youth	—N/a			
Worldwide	International Network of Liberal Women	—N/a			

=== Observer parties ===
Country/Region	Name	Government
Andorra	Action for Andorra	Opposition
Brazil	New Party	Opposition
Burkina Faso	Union pour le Progrès et le Changement	Opposition
Comoros	Alliance Nationale pour les Comores	Extra-parliamentary
Democratic Republic of the Congo	Union pour la reconstruction du Congo	Opposition
Republic of the Congo	Union des Democrates Humanistes (UDH-YUKI)	—N/a
Republic of the Congo	Mouvement républicain	Opposition
Costa Rica	Progressive Liberal Party	Opposition
Cyprus	United Democrats	Extra-parliamentary
Georgia	Girchi – More Freedom	Extra-parliamentary
Ghana	Progressive People's Party	Opposition
Hungary	Momentum Movement	Opposition
Israel	Yesh Atid	Opposition
Malaysia	Parti Gerakan Rakyat Malaysia	In opposition
Mali	Citizens' Party for the Renewal of Mali	Extra-parliamentary
Mali	Union pour la République et la Démocratie (URD)	—N/a
Mauritania	Rally for Mauritania	Opposition
Moldova	Coalition for Unity and Welfare	Extra-parliamentary
Morocco	Moroccan Liberal Party	Extra-parliamentary
Nicaragua	Ruta del Cambio	Extra-parliamentary
Singapore	Singapore Democratic Party	Extra-parliamentary
Suriname	Democratic Alternative '91	Extra-parliamentary
Tunisia	Afek Tounes	Extra-parliamentary
Ukraine	Holos	Opposition
Venezuela	Vente Venezuela	Extra-parliamentary
Zambia	United Party for National Development	Government

=== Individual member ===
Country	Name	Government
Hong Kong	Mr Martin Lee – founding chairman of Democratic Party	Extra-parliamentary

== Cooperating organisations ==
Cooperating and regional organisations are groups with a recognised status in the constitution of Liberal International as bodies that share the values and objectives of LI but do not operate as a political party. Co-operating organisations have the right of representation but in no case the right to vote at statutory events. LI has 12 cooperating organisations.

Organisation	Region
Africa Liberal Network	Africa
Council of Asian Liberals and Democrats	Asia
Alliance of Liberals and Democrats for Europe in the Parliamentary Assembly of the Council of Europe (ALDE-PACE)	Europe
Friedrich Naumann Stiftung	Europe
Fondazione Libro Aperto	Europe
Fondazione Luigi Einaudi	Europe
Neue Zürcher Zeitung	Europe
Swedish International Liberal Centre	Europe
Red Liberal de América Latina	Latin America
Arab Liberal Federation	MENA
National Democratic Institute	North America

== Liberal think tanks and foundations ==
The International is also in a loose association with the following 10 organisations:

Organisation	Country
Centre Jean Gol	Belgium
Fondazione Luigi Einaudi	Italy
Fondazione Critica Liberale	Italy
Liberal Institute	Germany
Teldersstichting	Netherlands
The Bertil Ohlin Institute	Sweden
Education Policy Institute	United Kingdom
European Liberal Forum	Europe
Livres (movement)	Brazil
Paddy Ashdown Forum	United Kingdom

== See also ==
- Liberalism by country
- Prize For Freedom
- Alliance of Democrats (defunct)
- European Democratic Party
