= Seventh Legislature of the National Assembly of People's Power of Cuba =

Cuban legislature (2008–2013)

Seventh Legislature of the National Assembly of People's Power Séptima Legislatura de la Asamblea Nacional del Poder Popular
- 7th Legislature
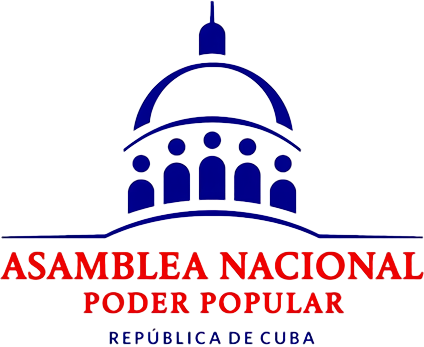

Type
- Type: Unicameral

History
- Preceded by: Congress of Cuba

Leadership
- President: Ricardo Alarcón
- Vice President: Jaime Crombet Hernández-Baquero from 2008 to 2012, Ana María Marí Machado from 2012 to 2013

Structure
- Seats: 614
- Political groups: Communist Party of Cuba

Elections
- Voting system: Two-round system
- Last election: 2008
- Next election: 2013

Meeting place
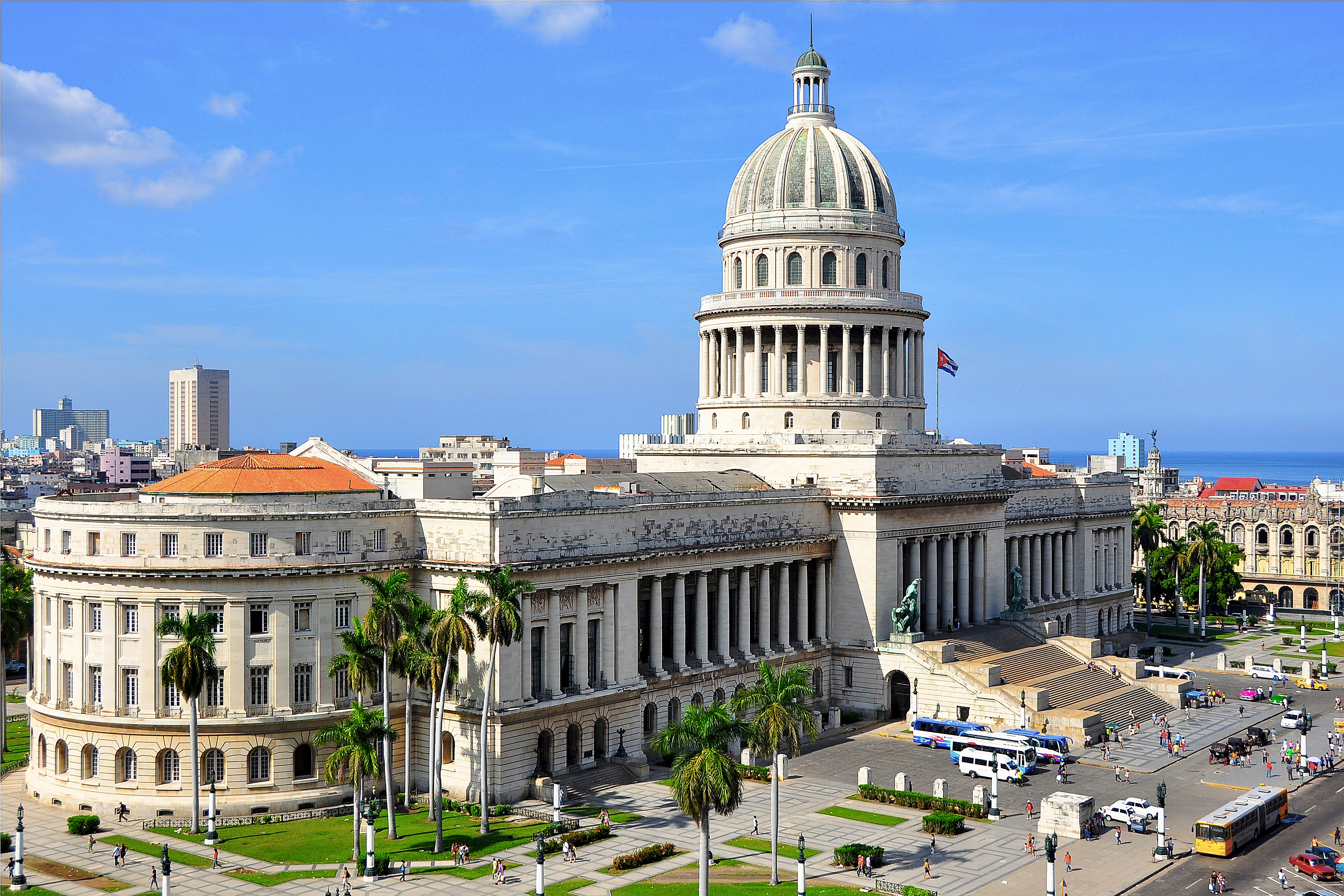
- El Capitolio, Havana

Website
- www.parlamentocubano.gob.cu

The Seventh Legislature of the National Assembly of People's Power of Cuba was the legislature of Cuba between 2008 and 2013. The deputies were elected to office in the 2008 Cuban parliamentary election for a period of five years.

The President was Ricardo Alarcón, the Vice President was Jaime Crombet Hernández-Baquero from 2008 to 2012, then Ana María Marí Machado from 2012 to 2013, and Miriam Brito Saroca was secretary.

The members of the Seventh Legislature of the National Assembly were as follows:

== Deputies ==
| Province | Municipality | Deputy |
|---|---|---|
| Artemisa | Bahía Honda | María Josefa Otaño Díaz |
| Artemisa | Bahía Honda | Olga Lidia Tapia Iglesias |
| Artemisa | Candelaria | María de los Ángeles Alonso González |
| Artemisa | Candelaria | Ángel López Mirabal |
| Artemisa | San Cristóbal | Mercedes Rodríguez Seijó |
| Artemisa | San Cristóbal | Nardo Bobadilla Labrador |
| Artemisa | San Cristóbal | Sarah Yadira Gázquez Camejo |
| Artemisa | San Cristóbal | Jaime Alberto Crombet Hernández-Baquero |
| Artemisa | Güira de Melena | Nayla Patterson Prieto |
| Artemisa | Güira de Melena | Orlando Lugo Fonte |
| Artemisa | Alquízar | Raúl de la Rosa González |
| Artemisa | Alquízar | María de los Ángeles Balaguert Díaz |
| Artemisa | Artemisa | Caridad Fuentes Rivero |
| Artemisa | Artemisa | Pablo García Morejón |
| Artemisa | Artemisa | Ulises Guilarte de Nacimiento |
| Artemisa | Artemisa | Ramiro Valdés Menéndez |
| Artemisa | Mariel | Elda María Fernández Acosta |
| Artemisa | Mariel | Antonio Evidio Hernández López |
| Artemisa | Guanajay | Mayra Concepción Godoy Fariñas |
| Artemisa | Guanajay | Carmen Rosa López Rodríguez |
| Artemisa | Caimito | Miguel Enrique Charbonet Martell |
| Artemisa | Caimito | Berta Onelia Mezquía Noa |
| Artemisa | Bauta | Omar Felipe Mauri Sierra |
| Artemisa | San Antonio de los Baños | Gircia Llanes Morales |
| Artemisa | San Antonio de los Baños | Elsa Rojas Hernández |
| Camagüey Province | Céspedes | Irma Martín Sánchez |
| Camagüey Province | Céspedes | Ermela Dámasa García Santiago |
| Camagüey Province | Esmeralda | Nelson Evaristo Iraola Valdés |
| Camagüey Province | Esmeralda | Jesús Arturo García Collazo |
| Camagüey Province | Sierra de Cubitas | Rosa Amelia Font Sánchez |
| Camagüey Province | Sierra de Cubitas | Julio César García Rodríguez |
| Camagüey Province | Minas | Norma Irene Rodríguez Benítez |
| Camagüey Province | Minas | Enrique Carmelo Pérez Medina |
| Camagüey Province | Nuevitas | Maritza Brea Guerra |
| Camagüey Province | Nuevitas | Nilo Lázaro Vázquez García |
| Camagüey Province | Guáimaro | Pedra Esperanza Valdés Pérez |
| Camagüey Province | Guáimaro | Estrella Teresa Herrera Isach |
| Camagüey Province | Guáimaro | Rosario del Pilar Pentón Díaz |
| Camagüey Province | Sibanicú | Armando López Montero |
| Camagüey Province | Sibanicú | Orlando Montero Carmenates |
| Camagüey Province | Camagüey | Enrique Jesús Aguilar Gondar |
| Camagüey Province | Camagüey | Reynaldo Silvio Palacio Recio |
| Camagüey Province | Camagüey | Andrés Eugenio Morales Leal |
| Camagüey Province | Camagüey | Marcial Alcides Mendoza Ramos |
| Camagüey Province | Camagüey | Teresa Cruz Proenza |
| Camagüey Province | Camagüey | María Cristina de la Caridad Cruz Peña |
| Camagüey Province | Camagüey | Migdalia Águila Aróstegui |
| Camagüey Province | Camagüey | Bertha Emilia Felipe Barcen |
| Camagüey Province | Camagüey | Luis Fernando Ynchausti Rodríguez |
| Camagüey Province | Camagüey | Peter Josué Borges Basulto |
| Camagüey Province | Camagüey | Raida Castañeda Marín |
| Camagüey Province | Camagüey | Martha Adán Hernández |
| Camagüey Province | Camagüey | Adalberto Cecilio Álvarez Zayas |
| Camagüey Province | Camagüey | Juan Vela Valdés |
| Camagüey Province | Camagüey | Yipsy Moreno González |
| Camagüey Province | Camagüey | Faure Chomón Mediavilla |
| Camagüey Province | Florida | Olga Lidia Palacio Madrid |
| Camagüey Province | Florida | Nieves López Ruiz |
| Camagüey Province | Florida | Anielka Fernández del Monte |
| Camagüey Province | Florida | Milagros Vallés Silot |
| Camagüey Province | Vertientes | Yodalkis Fajardo Orihuela |
| Camagüey Province | Vertientes | José Virgilio Molina Herrera |
| Camagüey Province | Vertientes | Sergio Alberto Valdés Ruiz |
| Camagüey Province | Jimaguayú | Zulema Viamontes Torres |
| Camagüey Province | Jimaguayú | Ángel Salvador Morell Castillo |
| Camagüey Province | Najasa | Osmany Delfín López Soto |
| Camagüey Province | Najasa | Elba Martínez Amador |
| Camagüey Province | Santa Cruz del Sur | Carlos Andrés Masíd Castejón |
| Camagüey Province | Santa Cruz del Sur | Roberto Basulto Baker |
| Camagüey Province | Santa Cruz del Sur | Salvador Antonio Valdés Mesa |
| Ciego de Ávila Province | Chambas | Adel Pérez Sánchez |
| Ciego de Ávila Province | Chambas | Julio Martínez Ramírez |
| Ciego de Ávila Province | Morón | Leticia Catalina Pérez Delgado |
| Ciego de Ávila Province | Morón | Antonio Raunel Hernández Rodríguez |
| Ciego de Ávila Province | Morón | Mitchell Joseph Valdés Sosa |
| Ciego de Ávila Province | Bolivia | Arais Miralles Espinosa |
| Ciego de Ávila Province | Bolivia | Martha Nidia Rodríguez Martínez |
| Ciego de Ávila Province | Primero de Enero | Tania Correa Lorenzo |
| Ciego de Ávila Province | Primero de Enero | Reina Lucía Blanco Báez |
| Ciego de Ávila Province | Ciro Redondo | María Luisa Cañizares Rodríguez |
| Ciego de Ávila Province | Ciro Redondo | Trifina Fernández Mora |
| Ciego de Ávila Province | Florencia | Pedro Gustavo Galdona Melo |
| Ciego de Ávila Province | Florencia | Mayelin Ojeda Torres |
| Ciego de Ávila Province | Majagua | Nilda Bárbara Rodríguez Castillo |
| Ciego de Ávila Province | Majagua | José Ignacio Quiñones Venegas |
| Ciego de Ávila Province | Ciego de Ávila | Alberto Pastor Fernández Pena |
| Ciego de Ávila Province | Ciego de Ávila | Raúl Rey Sardiñas Companioni |
| Ciego de Ávila Province | Ciego de Ávila | Omar Abreu Valdivia |
| Ciego de Ávila Province | Ciego de Ávila | Jorge Luis Tapia Fonseca |
| Ciego de Ávila Province | Ciego de Ávila | Misleydi Abad Modey |
| Ciego de Ávila Province | Ciego de Ávila | Carlos Blanco Sánchez |
| Ciego de Ávila Province | Ciego de Ávila | Héctor Gregorio Rodríguez Almaral |
| Ciego de Ávila Province | Venezuela | Mirtha Manzanares Bautista |
| Ciego de Ávila Province | Venezuela | Verania Felicia Hernández Peláez |
| Ciego de Ávila Province | Baraguá | Tania Nuez González |
| Ciego de Ávila Province | Baraguá | Ernesto López Domínguez |
| Cienfuegos Province | Aguada de Pasajeros | Caridad Capote Coren |
| Cienfuegos Province | Aguada de Pasajeros | Julián Álvarez Blanco |
| Cienfuegos Province | Rodas | Jorge Luis Gómez González |
| Cienfuegos Province | Rodas | Ramón Pez Ferro |
| Cienfuegos Province | Palmira | Teresa Felicia Manso Estévez |
| Cienfuegos Province | Palmira | Liz Belkis Rosabal Ponce |
| Cienfuegos Province | Lajas | Juan José Sánchez Pérez |
| Cienfuegos Province | Lajas | Alfredo Darío Espinosa Brito |
| Cienfuegos Province | Cruces | Dagoberto Pérez Almeida |
| Cienfuegos Province | Cruces | Irán Millán Cuétara |
| Cienfuegos Province | Cumanayagua | Carlos Curbelo Yánes |
| Cienfuegos Province | Cumanayagua | Rolando Díaz González |
| Cienfuegos Province | Cumanayagua | Liudmila Álamo Dueñas |
| Cienfuegos Province | Cienfuegos | Pablo Ramón Galván Vigo |
| Cienfuegos Province | Cienfuegos | Gisela María Duarte Vázquez |
| Cienfuegos Province | Cienfuegos | Danayasi Santana González |
| Cienfuegos Province | Cienfuegos | Alberto Posada Mederos |
| Cienfuegos Province | Cienfuegos | Roberto Tomás Morales Ojeda |
| Cienfuegos Province | Cienfuegos | Osvaldo Surí González |
| Cienfuegos Province | Cienfuegos | Frank Fernández Tamayo |
| Cienfuegos Province | Cienfuegos | Eugenio Luis Mainegra Álvarez |
| Cienfuegos Province | Abreus | Clara Luz Mantilla Acea |
| Cienfuegos Province | Abreus | Isis María Leyva Betancourt |
| Ciudad de La Habana Province | Playa | Aymé Blanco Sam |
| Ciudad de La Habana Province | Playa | Génesis Izquierdo Montes |
| Ciudad de La Habana Province | Playa | Ortelio Bienvenido Martín Tanquero |
| Ciudad de La Habana Province | Playa | Reina Leticia Veitía Núñez |
| Ciudad de La Habana Province | Playa | Pedro Sáez Montejo |
| Ciudad de La Habana Province | Playa | Concepción Campa Huergo |
| Ciudad de La Habana Province | Playa | Roberto Fernández Retamar |
| Ciudad de La Habana Province | Playa | Yailén Insúa Alarcón |
| Ciudad de La Habana Province | Plaza de la Revolución | Marta Beatriz D’Alvaré González |
| Ciudad de La Habana Province | Plaza de la Revolución | Teresa Mercedes Cisneros Díaz |
| Ciudad de La Habana Province | Plaza de la Revolución | Luis Raúl García Calvo |
| Ciudad de La Habana Province | Plaza de la Revolución | Adrián Doyle Lorenzo |
| Ciudad de La Habana Province | Plaza de la Revolución | José Luis Toledo Santander |
| Ciudad de La Habana Province | Plaza de la Revolución | Jesús Espinosa Abrahantes |
| Ciudad de La Habana Province | Plaza de la Revolución | Ricardo Alarcón de Quesada |
| Ciudad de La Habana Province | Centro Habana | Olivia Teresa González Gay |
| Ciudad de La Habana Province | Centro Habana | Gilberto Barrial Soto |
| Ciudad de La Habana Province | Centro Habana | Isabel Cristina Bandera Nivar |
| Ciudad de La Habana Province | Centro Habana | Esther Faustina Ramos Remón |
| Ciudad de La Habana Province | Centro Habana | Delsa Esther Puebla Viltre |
| Ciudad de La Habana Province | Centro Habana | Leonardo Trácter Jordán |
| Ciudad de La Habana Province | Centro Habana | Luis Morlote Rivas |
| Ciudad de La Habana Province | Centro Habana | Georgina Bonilla Pimentel |
| Ciudad de La Habana Province | Habana Vieja | Icela Rodríguez Megret |
| Ciudad de La Habana Province | Habana Vieja | Claribel Aguilar Rodríguez |
| Ciudad de La Habana Province | Habana Vieja | Eusebio Leal Spengler |
| Ciudad de La Habana Province | Habana Vieja | Antonio Orestes Castañeda Márquez |
| Ciudad de La Habana Province | Habana Vieja | Carlos Alberto Cremata Malberti |
| Ciudad de La Habana Province | Regla | Yemel Eduardo García Díaz |
| Ciudad de La Habana Province | Regla | Arelys Santana Bello |
| Ciudad de La Habana Province | Habana del Este | Jacqueline Hernández Magaña |
| Ciudad de La Habana Province | Habana del Este | Laura Bolívar González |
| Ciudad de La Habana Province | Habana del Este | Judith Apsara Caballero Báez |
| Ciudad de La Habana Province | Habana del Este | Blanca Esther Ballester Santos |
| Ciudad de La Habana Province | Habana del Este | Ibis Juanes Caballero |
| Ciudad de La Habana Province | Habana del Este | Cecilia Valdés Milián |
| Ciudad de La Habana Province | Habana del Este | Aldys Morales Martínez |
| Ciudad de La Habana Province | Habana del Este | Hassan Pérez Casabona |
| Ciudad de La Habana Province | Habana del Este | Randy Alonso Falcón |
| Ciudad de La Habana Province | Guanabacoa | Sarah Esther Pereira Martos |
| Ciudad de La Habana Province | Guanabacoa | Jorge Julián Castro Cisneros |
| Ciudad de La Habana Province | Guanabacoa | José Tamayo Cardet |
| Ciudad de La Habana Province | Guanabacoa | Miguel Ángel Barnet Lanza |
| Ciudad de La Habana Province | Guanabacoa | Enrique Javier Gómez Cabeza |
| Ciudad de La Habana Province | San Miguel del Padrón | Eugenio Fernández Cruz |
| Ciudad de La Habana Province | San Miguel del Padrón | Oscar Delgado Lorenzo |
| Ciudad de La Habana Province | San Miguel del Padrón | Daymara Ileana Aguilar Sevillano |
| Ciudad de La Habana Province | San Miguel del Padrón | Rafael Luis Iznaga Álvarez |
| Ciudad de La Habana Province | San Miguel del Padrón | Jorge de la Caridad González Pérez |
| Ciudad de La Habana Province | San Miguel del Padrón | Leonardo Eugenio Martínez López |
| Ciudad de La Habana Province | San Miguel del Padrón | Pedro Alcántara Ross Leal |
| Ciudad de La Habana Province | San Miguel del Padrón | Ana Fidelia Quirós Moret |
| Ciudad de La Habana Province | Diez de Octubre | Perfecto Jesús Hernández Montalvo |
| Ciudad de La Habana Province | Diez de Octubre | Isabel García Góngora |
| Ciudad de La Habana Province | Diez de Octubre | Yamilet de la Caridad Romero González |
| Ciudad de La Habana Province | Diez de Octubre | Caridad Agustina Campos Gomero |
| Ciudad de La Habana Province | Diez de Octubre | Daniel Rafuls Pineda |
| Ciudad de La Habana Province | Diez de Octubre | David Lahera Rodríguez |
| Ciudad de La Habana Province | Diez de Octubre | Yamila Peña Ojeda |
| Ciudad de La Habana Province | Diez de Octubre | Melba Hernández Rodríguez del Rey |
| Ciudad de La Habana Province | Diez de Octubre | Jorge Jesús Gómez Barranco |
| Ciudad de La Habana Province | Diez de Octubre | Alfredo Morales Cartaya |
| Ciudad de La Habana Province | Diez de Octubre | José Miguel Miyar Barruecos |
| Ciudad de La Habana Province | Cerro | Regla Claribel Mezquía Sánchez |
| Ciudad de La Habana Province | Cerro | Julio Luis Carbonel Valdés |
| Ciudad de La Habana Province | Cerro | Regla Maidel Pozo García |
| Ciudad de La Habana Province | Cerro | Javier Méndez González |
| Ciudad de La Habana Province | Cerro | María Teresa Ferrer Madrazo |
| Ciudad de La Habana Province | Cerro | Elia Rosa Lemus Lago |
| Ciudad de La Habana Province | Cerro | Magaly Plasencia Reyes |
| Ciudad de La Habana Province | Marianao | Yenielys Vilma Regüeiferos Linares |
| Ciudad de La Habana Province | Marianao | Mayra Elena Tasé Cruzata |
| Ciudad de La Habana Province | Marianao | Reinaldo Romero Pérez |
| Ciudad de La Habana Province | Marianao | Armando Torres Aguirre |
| Ciudad de La Habana Province | Marianao | Gretel Rafuls Trujillo |
| Ciudad de La Habana Province | Marianao | Raúl Suárez Ramos |
| Ciudad de La Habana Province | La Lisa | Kirenia Díaz Burke |
| Ciudad de La Habana Province | La Lisa | Gudelia Xiomara Díaz Bejerano |
| Ciudad de La Habana Province | La Lisa | Luis Oscar Sandrino Cantero |
| Ciudad de La Habana Province | La Lisa | Freddy Fernández Flaquet |
| Ciudad de La Habana Province | La Lisa | Marta Hernández Romero |
| Ciudad de La Habana Province | La Lisa | Carlos Manuel Gutiérrez Calzado |
| Ciudad de La Habana Province | La Lisa | Marcia Cobas Ruiz |
| Ciudad de La Habana Province | Boyeros | Danae Ruiz Jorrín |
| Ciudad de La Habana Province | Boyeros | Maura Cristina Casamayor Llinás |
| Ciudad de La Habana Province | Boyeros | Héctor Eligio Amigo Carcacés |
| Ciudad de La Habana Province | Boyeros | Dayma Mayelis Beltrán Guisado |
| Ciudad de La Habana Province | Boyeros | Juan Contino Aslán |
| Ciudad de La Habana Province | Boyeros | Rebeca Sonia González Fernández |
| Ciudad de La Habana Province | Boyeros | Erika Ferrer Hierrezuelo |
| Ciudad de La Habana Province | Boyeros | José María Rubiera Torres |
| Ciudad de La Habana Province | Boyeros | Ramón Pardo Guerra |
| Ciudad de La Habana Province | Arroyo Naranjo | Emilio Interián Rodríguez |
| Ciudad de La Habana Province | Arroyo Naranjo | Gerardo Enrique Hernández Suárez |
| Ciudad de La Habana Province | Arroyo Naranjo | Danis Robin Rivero González |
| Ciudad de La Habana Province | Arroyo Naranjo | María del Carmen Barroso González |
| Ciudad de La Habana Province | Arroyo Naranjo | Carlos Liranza García |
| Ciudad de La Habana Province | Arroyo Naranjo | Doralys Hernández Cordero |
| Ciudad de La Habana Province | Arroyo Naranjo | Liliana Esquerra Corripio |
| Ciudad de La Habana Province | Arroyo Naranjo | Magali Llort Ruiz |
| Ciudad de La Habana Province | Arroyo Naranjo | Esteban Lazo Hernández |
| Ciudad de La Habana Province | Arroyo Naranjo | Leopoldo Cintra Frías |
| Ciudad de La Habana Province | Cotorro | Michel Milán Reyes |
| Ciudad de La Habana Province | Cotorro | Olga de la Cruz Reinoso |
| Ciudad de La Habana Province | Cotorro | Lizette María Vila Noya |
| Ciudad de La Habana Province | Cotorro | Harry Antonio Villegas Tamayo |
| Granma Province | Río Cauto | Reynaldo Montoya Cedeño |
| Granma Province | Río Cauto | Mariela González Torres |
| Granma Province | Cauto Cristo | Roberto Bazán Osoria |
| Granma Province | Cauto Cristo | Pedro Víctor Simón Rodríguez |
| Granma Province | Jiguaní | Rafaela García Leyva |
| Granma Province | Jiguaní | Norvelio Aguilar Zamora |
| Granma Province | Jiguaní | Óscar Torres Martínez |
| Granma Province | Bayamo | Ciro Carmona Flores |
| Granma Province | Bayamo | Francy Rebeca Garcés García |
| Granma Province | Bayamo | Arturo Pérez Sánchez |
| Granma Province | Bayamo | Edita Ramírez Carrasco |
| Granma Province | Bayamo | Luis Manuel Ramírez Villazana |
| Granma Province | Bayamo | Yordanys Charchaval de la Rosa |
| Granma Province | Bayamo | Teobaldo de la Paz Vanega |
| Granma Province | Bayamo | Ramón Osmani Aguilar Betancourt |
| Granma Province | Bayamo | José Luis Rodríguez García |
| Granma Province | Bayamo | José Reinaldo Fernández Vega |
| Granma Province | Bayamo | Leonardo Ramón Andollo Valdés |
| Granma Province | Yara | Elionides Labrada Rodríguez |
| Granma Province | Yara | Alberto Verdecia Salas |
| Granma Province | Yara | Leonardo Tamayo Núñez |
| Granma Province | Manzanillo | Luis Alberto Fonseca Jorge |
| Granma Province | Manzanillo | Marjoris Blásquez Anache |
| Granma Province | Manzanillo | Irina Domínguez Romero |
| Granma Province | Manzanillo | Iris Betancourt Téllez |
| Granma Province | Manzanillo | Lázaro Fernando Expósito Canto |
| Granma Province | Manzanillo | Luis Rafael Virelles Barreda |
| Granma Province | Manzanillo | Lázara Mercedes López Acea |
| Granma Province | Campechuela | Abel Faustino Peña Saborit |
| Granma Province | Campechuela | Cira Piñeiro Alonso |
| Granma Province | Media Luna | Carlos Arturo López Guerra |
| Granma Province | Media Luna | Jesús Antonio Infante López |
| Granma Province | Niquero | Vindenay Ortiz Montero |
| Granma Province | Niquero | Aniuska Rosa Licea González |
| Granma Province | Pilón | Dignora Tamayo Castillo |
| Granma Province | Pilón | Guillermo García Frías |
| Granma Province | Bartolomé Masó | Víctor Julio de la Paz Hernández |
| Granma Province | Bartolomé Masó | Ángela Piña Ladrón de Guevara |
| Granma Province | Bartolomé Masó | Romárico Vidal Sotomayor García |
| Granma Province | Buey Arriba | Antonia Cámbara Isaac |
| Granma Province | Buey Arriba | Mario Valentín Cisnero López |
| Granma Province | Guisa | Míriam Milán Taset |
| Granma Province | Guisa | Inés Lourdes Ferrera González |
| Granma Province | Guisa | Roberto Siro Verrier Castro |
| Guantánamo Province | El Salvador | Lorna Mirás San Jorge |
| Guantánamo Province | El Salvador | Mariela Rondón Pereña |
| Guantánamo Province | Guantánamo | Dioscórides González Blanco |
| Guantánamo Province | Guantánamo | Josefina Heredia Alcolea |
| Guantánamo Province | Guantánamo | Vilma Beatrice Hamilton Asencio |
| Guantánamo Province | Guantánamo | Octavio Leslie García Lescaille |
| Guantánamo Province | Guantánamo | Yusmaikel Valier Ramírez |
| Guantánamo Province | Guantánamo | Carlos Manuel Céspedes Arias |
| Guantánamo Province | Guantánamo | Emma Gago Pérez |
| Guantánamo Province | Guantánamo | Luis Antonio Torres Iríbar |
| Guantánamo Province | Guantánamo | Omar Cosme Noblet |
| Guantánamo Province | Guantánamo | Ismael Drullet Pérez |
| Guantánamo Province | Guantánamo | José Ramón Machado Ventura |
| Guantánamo Province | Guantánamo | Gladys María Bejerano Portela |
| Guantánamo Province | Yateras | Eduardo Caraballo Rojas |
| Guantánamo Province | Yateras | Ramón Frómeta Ordúñez |
| Guantánamo Province | Baracoa | Felipe Ramírez Paján |
| Guantánamo Province | Baracoa | Mailer Díaz Matos |
| Guantánamo Province | Baracoa | Luis Fernando Navarro Martínez |
| Guantánamo Province | Baracoa | Arnaldo Tamayo Méndez |
| Guantánamo Province | Maisí | Jorge Luis López Leguén |
| Guantánamo Province | Maisí | María Josefa Mirás San Jorge |
| Guantánamo Province | Imías | Leovanny Ramírez Utria |
| Guantánamo Province | Imías | Claro Orlando Almaguel Vidal |
| Guantánamo Province | San Antonio del Sur | Walker Gamboa Prieto |
| Guantánamo Province | San Antonio del Sur | Misael Hernández Rodríguez |
| Guantánamo Province | Manuel Tames | Leonardo Matos Romero |
| Guantánamo Province | Manuel Tames | Liaena Hernández Martínez |
| Guantánamo Province | Caimanera | Osvaldo Rojo Coy |
| Guantánamo Province | Caimanera | Armando Enrique García Batista |
| Guantánamo Province | Niceto Pérez | Eglis Caridad Gómez Soto |
| Guantánamo Province | Niceto Pérez | Avelio Machuca Vega |
| Holguín Province | Gibara | Miguel Ángel Sainz Serrano |
| Holguín Province | Gibara | Mercedes Xiomara Curubeco Gavilán |
| Holguín Province | Gibara | Aida Leonor Oro Lau |
| Holguín Province | Gibara | Carlos Fernández Gondín |
| Holguín Province | Holguín | Fernando Ávila Hernández |
| Holguín Province | Rafael Freyre | Reinier de Jesús Garmendía Zaldívar |
| Holguín Province | Rafael Freyre | Rubén Martínez Puente |
| Holguín Province | Rafael Freyre | Susana Virgen Caballero Pupo |
| Holguín Province | Banes | Narno Licerio Verdecia Betancourt |
| Holguín Province | Banes | Roberto Peña Concepción |
| Holguín Province | Banes | Julio Méndez Rivero |
| Holguín Province | Banes | Jorge Luis Guerrero Almaguer |
| Holguín Province | Antilla | Ramón Hechavarría Sánchez |
| Holguín Province | Antilla | Jorge Berrío Sánchez |
| Holguín Province | Báguanos | Rosell González Pérez |
| Holguín Province | Báguanos | Luis Clodovaldo Velázquez Pérez |
| Holguín Province | Báguanos | Fernando Humberto Arrojas Cowley |
| Holguín Province | Holguín | Vitaliano González Reyes |
| Holguín Province | Holguín | Rubiseida Díaz González |
| Holguín Province | Holguín | Gisela García Gómez |
| Holguín Province | Holguín | Jorge Alberto Leyva Pérez |
| Holguín Province | Holguín | Alejandro Martín Moro |
| Holguín Province | Holguín | Marbelis Virgen Proenza Rojas |
| Holguín Province | Holguín | María Lidia Frómeta Serrano |
| Holguín Province | Holguín | Miguel Mario Díaz-Canel Bermúdez |
| Holguín Province | Holguín | Francisco Batista Herrera |
| Holguín Province | Holguín | Beatriz Rodríguez Carballosa |
| Holguín Province | Holguín | Pura Concepción Avilés Cruz |
| Holguín Province | Holguín | Ramón Espinosa Martín |
| Holguín Province | Holguín | Georgina Barreiro Fajardo |
| Holguín Province | Holguín | Walter José Santana Haber |
| Holguín Province | Holguín | Raymundo Mirel Navarro Fernández |
| Holguín Province | Holguín | Rogelio Polanco Fuentes |
| Holguín Province | Calixto García | Maritza Regina Morales Leal |
| Holguín Province | Calixto García | Marieta Cutiño Rodríguez |
| Holguín Province | Calixto García | Lázaro Barredo Medina |
| Holguín Province | Cacocum | Nivian Rodríguez Rodríguez |
| Holguín Province | Cacocum | Glicerio Hernández Batista |
| Holguín Province | Urbano Noris | Elia Enriqueta Pupo Maceo |
| Holguín Province | Urbano Noris | Milagro Rodríguez Peña |
| Holguín Province | Cueto | Ramona Antonia Vargas Montero |
| Holguín Province | Cueto | Violeta Mesa Castillo |
| Holguín Province | Mayarí | Julio César Estupiñán Rodríguez |
| Holguín Province | Mayarí | Alberta Rodríguez Almira |
| Holguín Province | Mayarí | Isidora Gordón Benjamín |
| Holguín Province | Mayarí | Pedro José Astraín Rodríguez |
| Holguín Province | Mayarí | Nidia Diana Martínez Piti |
| Holguín Province | Frank País | Luis Felipe Simón Cabreja |
| Holguín Province | Frank País | Inés María Chapman Waugh |
| Holguín Province | Sagua de Tánamo | Benito González Loforte |
| Holguín Province | Sagua de Tánamo | Vivian Rodríguez Gondín |
| Holguín Province | Sagua de Tánamo | Osvaldo Martínez Martínez |
| Holguín Province | Moa | Luis Alexis Sanamé Breff |
| Holguín Province | Moa | Ana Iris Blanco Ochandarena |
| Holguín Province | Moa | Alberto Cirilo Pantón Grhaum |
| Holguín Province | Moa | Ángel Antonio Morffi Losada |
| Isla de la Juventud | Isla de la Juventud | Mirta Millán Nieves |
| Isla de la Juventud | Isla de la Juventud | Roberto Francisco Unger Pérez |
| Isla de la Juventud | Isla de la Juventud | Alexis Leyva Machado |
| Isla de la Juventud | Isla de la Juventud | Ana Isa Delgado Jardines |
| Mayabeque | Bejucal | Marta María González Bargo |
| Mayabeque | Bejucal | Leonardo Cabezas Rodríguez |
| Mayabeque | San José de las Lajas | Isauro Ismael Montesinos Bernal |
| Mayabeque | San José de las Lajas | Maribel Valle Clara |
| Mayabeque | San José de las Lajas | Jorge Félix Lazo Mesa |
| Mayabeque | Jaruco | Alfredo Pérez Rodríguez |
| Mayabeque | Jaruco | Tubal Páez Hernández |
| Mayabeque | Santa Cruz del Norte | Evelio Evaristo Hernández Álvarez |
| Mayabeque | Santa Cruz del Norte | Miriam Brito Sarroca |
| Mayabeque | Madruga | José Luis Mederos Peña |
| Mayabeque | Madruga | Nicolás Echeverría Díaz |
| Mayabeque | Nueva Paz | Emilio Falcón Aguilar |
| Mayabeque | Nueva Paz | José Antonio Carrillo Gómez |
| Mayabeque | San Nicolás | Valentín Ireneo Duquesne Chávez |
| Mayabeque | San Nicolás | Teresa de la Caridad Hernández Morejón |
| Mayabeque | Güines | Mercedes Caridad Guerra González |
| Mayabeque | Güines | Armando Remigio Cuéllar Domínguez |
| Mayabeque | Güines | Samuel Rodiles Planas |
| Mayabeque | Melena del Sur | Paula Rita Brito Sánchez |
| Mayabeque | Melena del Sur | Abelardo Álvarez Gil |
| Mayabeque | Batabanó | Daisys Pedroso Pares |
| Mayabeque | Batabanó | Edel Gómez Gómez |
| Mayabeque | Quivicán | Abilio Carlos Piedra Torres |
| Mayabeque | Quivicán | Juan Jorge Castro Ortiz |
| Las Tunas | Manatí | Nidia Dolores Llunch Nápoles |
| Las Tunas | Manatí | Juan Vigó Moracén |
| Las Tunas | Puerto Padre | Vitalina Rosa Álvarez Torres |
| Las Tunas | Puerto Padre | Yuneysis Escalona Batista |
| Las Tunas | Puerto Padre | Míriam Agatha Smile Whilby |
| Las Tunas | Puerto Padre | Benedicto Peña Guerra |
| Las Tunas | Puerto Padre | Manuel Menéndez Castellanos |
| Las Tunas | Jesús Menéndez | Salvador Juan Pupo Leyva |
| Las Tunas | Jesús Menéndez | Magalys Chacón Gallegos |
| Las Tunas | Jesús Menéndez | Guillermo González Yero |
| Las Tunas | Majibacoa | José Alberto Girón Zayas |
| Las Tunas | Majibacoa | José Luis Fernández Yero |
| Las Tunas | Las Tunas | Celia Díaz Cantillo |
| Las Tunas | Las Tunas | Julio César Reyes Rivero |
| Las Tunas | Las Tunas | Juan Eliades Ortiz Hechavarría |
| Las Tunas | Las Tunas | Rubén Darío Palmero Duthil |
| Las Tunas | Las Tunas | Maricelys Mallory González Hernández |
| Las Tunas | Las Tunas | Jorge Cuevas Ramos |
| Las Tunas | Las Tunas | Víctor Luis Rodríguez Carballosa |
| Las Tunas | Las Tunas | Pablo Odén Marichal Rodríguez |
| Las Tunas | Las Tunas | Víctor Fidel Gaute López |
| Las Tunas | Las Tunas | Kenia Serrano Puig |
| Las Tunas | Jobabo | Luz Marda Arrieta Hechavarría |
| Las Tunas | Jobabo | Omar Ramadán Reyes |
| Las Tunas | Colombia | Yoslaine Peña Rodríguez |
| Las Tunas | Colombia | Isis Angelina Diez Duardo |
| Las Tunas | Amancio | Roberto Medrano Ledesma |
| Las Tunas | Amancio | Juan Rafael Ruiz Pérez |
| Matanzas | Matanzas | Reynold Miguel Díaz |
| Matanzas | Matanzas | Caridad Liliana Vidal Míguez |
| Matanzas | Matanzas | Adriana Rodríguez Oviedo |
| Matanzas | Matanzas | Joaquín Quintas Solás |
| Matanzas | Matanzas | Pedro Ramón Betancourt García |
| Matanzas | Matanzas | Mirian Yanet Martín González |
| Matanzas | Matanzas | María Elena Lacera García |
| Matanzas | Cárdenas | Ela Clara Valle Rodríguez |
| Matanzas | Cárdenas | Iradia Vega Arrieta |
| Matanzas | Cárdenas | Juan Miguel González Quintana |
| Matanzas | Cárdenas | Yadira García Vera |
| Matanzas | Cárdenas | Roberto León Richards Aguiar |
| Matanzas | Cárdenas | Sidelsy Súarez Sánchez |
| Matanzas | Cárdenas | Reynaldo Máximo Ruiz González |
| Matanzas | Martí | Fredesvinda Hernández Morales |
| Matanzas | Martí | Guillermo de la Portilla González |
| Matanzas | Colón | Tania León Silveira |
| Matanzas | Colón | Regla Alejandrina Ramos Hernández |
| Matanzas | Colón | Nilo Tomás Díaz Fundora |
| Matanzas | Colón | Álvaro López Miera |
| Matanzas | Perico | Elia Ferrer Silva |
| Matanzas | Perico | María Mercedes Fagundo Morín |
| Matanzas | Jovellanos | Marta Beatriz Almanza González |
| Matanzas | Jovellanos | Lucila María Hernández Toscano |
| Matanzas | Jovellanos | Teresa de la Caridad Rubio Pérez |
| Matanzas | Pedro Betancourt | Magali León González |
| Matanzas | Pedro Betancourt | Alejandrina Mesa Castellín |
| Matanzas | Limonar | Yanelis Falcón Guillermo |
| Matanzas | Limonar | Manuel Hernández Valdés |
| Matanzas | Unión de Reyes | Caridad Leonor Ramírez Ojeda |
| Matanzas | Unión de Reyes | Julio César Gandarilla Bermejo |
| Matanzas | Ciénaga de Zapata | Diosenis Machado Sánchez |
| Matanzas | Ciénaga de Zapata | Rita Lorena Delgado Martínez |
| Matanzas | Jagüey Grande | Raúl Edelberto Hernández Galarraga |
| Matanzas | Jagüey Grande | Roger Delgado Hernández |
| Matanzas | Jagüey Grande | José Ramón Fernández Álvarez |
| Matanzas | Calimete | Leyeví Correa Nogueira |
| Matanzas | Calimete | Ofelia Mirian Ortega Suárez |
| Matanzas | Los Arabos | Ernesto Ruiz Ramos |
| Matanzas | Los Arabos | Jorge Luis Sierra Cruz |
| Pinar del Río | Sandino | Bárbaro Osmany Lago Díaz |
| Pinar del Río | Sandino | Caridad del Rosario Diego Bello |
| Pinar del Río | Mantua | Ana Rosa Hernández Ramos |
| Pinar del Río | Mantua | Rubén Remigio Ferro |
| Pinar del Río | Minas de Matahambre | Iradia Hernández Machín |
| Pinar del Río | Minas de Matahambre | Luis Manuel Castañedo Smith |
| Pinar del Río | Viñales | Adalbelto Fernández Jiménez |
| Pinar del Río | Viñales | Humberto Hernández Martínez |
| Pinar del Río | La Palma | Marlén Pimentel Martínez |
| Pinar del Río | La Palma | Gladis Martínez Verdecia |
| Pinar del Río | Los Palacios | Gloria Esther Álvarez Morales |
| Pinar del Río | Los Palacios | Pedro Miguel Pérez Betancourt |
| Pinar del Río | Consolación del Sur | José Agustín Amor Rivero |
| Pinar del Río | Consolación del Sur | Rosaida Pérez Torres |
| Pinar del Río | Consolación del Sur | Abel Enrique Prieto Jiménez |
| Pinar del Río | Consolación del Sur | María del Carmen Concepción González |
| Pinar del Río | Pinar del Río | Leonor Lina Placencia Hernández |
| Pinar del Río | Pinar del Río | María Elena González González |
| Pinar del Río | Pinar del Río | Berkys Dianelys González Valdés |
| Pinar del Río | Pinar del Río | Manuel Cáceres Fernández |
| Pinar del Río | Pinar del Río | Reinaldo Silva Rojas |
| Pinar del Río | Pinar del Río | Carmen Rosa Montaño Rodríguez |
