= 2008 Cuban President of the Council of State election =

An indirect presidential election was held in Cuba on 24 February 2008, in which the National Assembly of People's Power elected a new President of the Council of State and the members of the Council of State. The election followed the January 2008 parliamentary election. In the election, Raúl Castro, who had been Acting President since July 2006, was elected as President of the Council of State, succeeding his older brother, Fidel Castro.

It was initially considered uncertain whether the ailing 81-year-old Fidel Castro would be elected for another term as President of the Council of State or acting president Raúl Castro would formally assume the presidency, but on 19 February Fidel Castro said that he would not seek another term because his physical condition would not allow him to properly carry out the duties of the office.

Raúl Castro, aged 76, was elected as President of the Council of State and the Council of Ministers by a unanimous vote of the National Assembly (on a ballot with only his name for the position) on 24 February 2008. José Ramón Machado Ventura, at age 77, was elected as First Vice-President of the Council of State and the Council of Ministers, contrary to speculation that someone younger would be chosen for the post. Raúl emphasized that his brother remained "Commander in Chief of the Cuban Revolution", and the National Assembly voted to permit Raúl to consult with Fidel on important issues.

600 deputies chose to cast united votes for all Council of State candidates, while nine deputies cast selective votes. Castro was elected with a unanimous vote of 609 deputies, while Machado received 601 votes. Juan Almeida Bosque, Abelardo Colomé Ibarra, Carlos Lage Dávila, Esteban Lazo Hernández, and Julio Casas Regueiro were elected as Vice-Presidents of the Council of State, all receiving 608 votes except for Lage, who received 609. José Miyar Barruecos was elected as Secretary of the Council of State with 608 votes. 23 other members of the Council of State were elected:

- José Ramón Balaguer Cabrera (608 votes)
- Iris Betancourt Téllez (609 votes)
- Roberto Fernández Retamar (609 votes)
- Luis Herrera Martínez (608 votes)
- Orlando Lugo Fonte (608 votes)
- Felipe Pérez Roque (609 votes)
- Pedro Sáez Montejo (609 votes)
- Ramiro Valdés Menéndez (608 votes)
- Francisco Soberón Valdés (608 votes)
- Carlos Valenciaga Díaz (609 votes)
- Surina Acosta Brook (609 votes)
- Regla Dayamí Armenteros Mesa (609 votes)
- Leopoldo Cintra Frías (609 votes)
- Inés María Chapman Waugh (609 votes)
- María del Carmen Concepción González (608 votes)
- María Yolanda Ferrer Gómez (609 votes)
- Guillermo García Frías (608 votes)
- Tania León Silveira (609 votes)
- Álvaro López Miera (608 votes)
- Julio Martínez Ramírez (609 votes)
- Dignora Montano Perdomo (609 votes)
- Juan José Rabilero Fonseca (606 votes)
- Salvador Valdés Mesa (609 votes)
