= Elections in Cuba =

Elections in Cuba are held at the municipal, provincial, and national levels. Cuba is a one-party state, with the Communist Party of Cuba being described as the "superior driving force of the society and the state" in the Constitution of Cuba. Because the Communist party is the only official political party, elections in Cuba are not considered democratic because the government does not allow free and fair voting.

There are currently 470 seats in the National Assembly of People's Power, Cuba's unicameral legislature, reduced from 605 seats after the 2023 elections. There is only one candidate for each seat in the Assembly, with all being nominated by committees that are firmly controlled by the Communist Party. Most legislative districts elect multiple representatives to the Assembly. Voters can select individual candidates on their ballot, select every candidate, or leave every question blank, with no option to vote against candidates. During the 2013 elections, around 80% of voters selected every candidate for the Assembly on their ballot, while 4.6% submitted a blank ballot; no candidate for the Assembly has lost an election in Cuban history. Cuba was ranked the second-least-democratic country in Latin America and the Caribbean (above only Venezuela) according to the V-Dem Institute's 2026 Liberal Democracy Index, with a score of 0.06 out of one.

The National Assembly is only in session twice per year, with the Council of State exercising the legislative authority throughout the rest of the year. The 21 members of the Council of State are elected by the Assembly, and a 2021 study determined that most members of the Council may have been defeated if they were elected by the people instead.

According to the 2019 Constitution of Cuba, the National Assembly retains the power to elect the president of Cuba, who in turn retains the power to "propose the election, appointment, suspension, revocation, or replacement" of the prime minister, the deputy prime minister, members of the Council of Ministers, the president, vice president and magistrates of the People's Supreme Court, the prosecutor general and the comptroller general of the republic and their deputies, the president and members of the National Electoral Council, all subject to approval of the National Assembly, which can also revoke or replace any officeholder it appoints.

== Procedure ==
According to the constitution, Cuba is a socialist republic where all members or representative bodies of state power are elected and subject to recall and the masses control the activity of the state agencies, the deputies, delegates and officials. Elections in Cuba have two phases:

1. election of delegates to the Municipal Assembly, and
2. election of deputies to the National Assembly.

Candidates for municipal assemblies are nominated on an individual basis at local levels by the local population at nomination assemblies. Candidates for the National Assembly are nominated by the municipal assemblies from lists compiled by national and municipal candidacy commissions. Suggestions for nominations are made at all levels mainly by mass organizations, trade unions, people's councils, and student federations. The final list of candidates for the National Assembly, one for each district, is drawn up by the National Candidacy Commission.

Provincial assemblies were eliminated in 2019, and provisional governors are proposed by the President of Cuba and approved by municipal assemblies, with no provisional elections occurring.

Anyone older than 16 other than those mentally incapacitated, imprisoned, or deprived of their political rights can vote and be nominated to these posts. Voters consult candidates' biographies and photographs posted on public locations. All elections take place by secret ballot. Suffrage is afforded to Cuban citizens resident for two years on the island who are aged over sixteen years and who have not been found guilty of a criminal offense.

=== Municipal elections ===
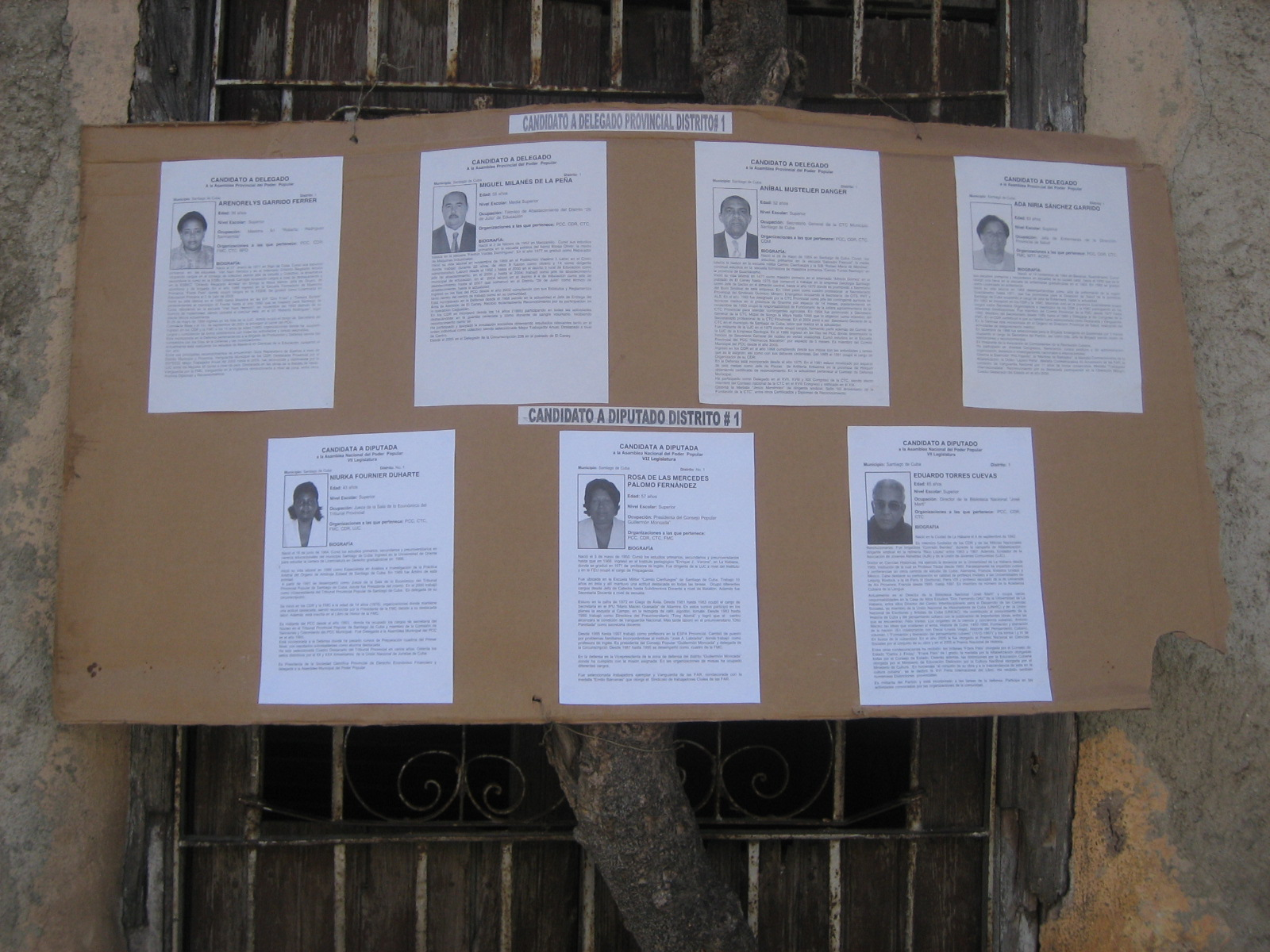
Candidates of the 2008 elections of the national and provincial parliaments in Santiago de Cuba

The election of municipal assembly delegates involves nomination by voters in nomination assemblies, compilation of posting of candidate biographies, voting by secret ballot, and recall. Deputies of the municipal assemblies are elected every 5 years. Municipal legislative elections are officially non-partisan.

Nomination assemblies are held about a month before the election in areas within the electoral districts. During regular elections, from 70% to over 90% of the electorate attend the nomination assemblies. Municipal candidates must be at least 16 years old.

In elections held on 21 October 2007, turnout was reported to be 8.1 million voters, approximately 95% of the population eligible to vote, which was less than the last such election on April 17, 2005, where voter turnout was 97%. Elections were then held in 2010 and 2013.

=== National elections ===
Cuba's national legislature, the National Assembly of People's Power, has 470 (reduced from 605 before the 2023 Cuban parliamentary election) members who sit for five-year terms. Members of the National Assembly represent multiple-member constituencies (2 to 5 members per district), with one Deputy for each 20,000 inhabitants.

Candidates for the National Assembly are chosen by candidacy commissions chaired by local trade union officials and composed of elected representatives of "mass organisations" representing workers, youth, women, students and farmers. The provincial and municipal candidacy commissions submit nominations to the National Candidacy Commission. The municipal candidacy commissions produce slates of recommended candidates for each electoral district, mainly submit nominations for candidates that are also municipal delegates, and first submit their nominations to their municipal assembly who may approve or replace nominations. The final list of candidates for the National Assembly, one for each district, is drawn up by the National Candidacy Commission, taking into account criteria such as candidates’ popularity, merit, patriotism, ethical values and "revolutionary history". At least half of the National Assembly candidates selected must have been previously elected as delegates to these assemblies.

Although there is only one candidate per seat, candidates must still obtain the support of 50% of voters to be elected. If a candidate were to fail to garner 50% of the vote, a new candidate would have to be chosen. However, this has never occurred.

Elections to the National Assembly were held on 24 February 2008. According to the Cuban Ministry of External Affairs, at the October 2002 elections to the Candidacy Commissions which preceded the January 2003 National Assembly elections, "32,585 candidates were nominated for the 14,949 seats up for election in October 2001 at grassroots assemblies in which 81.7% of the voters participated." So far no candidate for the National Assembly has ever failed to gain 50% of the vote, because the candidates put forward by the candidacy commissions usually receive at least 69.48% support.

=== Citizen's proposals ===
Article 88(h) of the Cuban constitution, adopted in 1976, provides for citizen proposals of law, prerequisite that the proposal be made by at least 10,000 citizens who are eligible to vote. In 2002 supporters of a movement known as the Varela Project submitted a citizen proposal of law with 11,000 signatures calling for a national referendum on political and economic reforms.

The Cuban National Assembly Constitution and Legal Affairs Committee tabled the Varela Project citizens' initiative and responded with a counter initiative, the petition for which collected 8.1 million signatures, to request that Cuba's National Assembly amend the constitution to state "Socialism and the revolutionary political and social system...are irrevocable; and Cuba will never again return to capitalism." At the same time, millions of Cubans took to the street. The BBC reported that some citizens had felt pressured to sign the government petition. The national legislature meets twice a year for a week, to pass unanimously all the bills proposed by the executive branch. In between the sessions, the Council of State and the NAPP's commissions perform its legislative duties.

== Political parties ==
The Communist Party of Cuba is the official state party and Cuba is a one-party state; the single-party system is enshrined in Article 5 of the Cuban Constitution.

In 1965, the 26th of July Movement, Popular Socialist Party, and 13 March Revolutionary Directorate were all merged into a single Communist Party under Fidel Castro. All other political parties were dissolved and banned. For decades, no opposition candidates were permitted to stand for office. Campaigning is not permitted in elections in Cuba; rather, photographs and biographies of candidates are publicly posted. In 2015, two dissident candidates (one independent, and one member of the outlawed Independent and Democratic Cuba Party founded by Huber Matos) stood for election to a Havana local council, the first openly declared opposition candidates to seek office since 1959. However, both were defeated.

== Comments ==
=== Political scientists ===
Many political scientists do not consider elections in Cuba to be democratic. The electoral process is firmly controlled by the current Cuban government.

William M. LeoGrande, in a paper written for the Cuba Transition Project at the Institute for Cuban and Cuban-American Studies at the University of Miami, wrote of the previous 1992 election law: "unprecedented openness in debate, not just among party members, but also among the entire populace, so as to foster greater participation and build 'the necessary consensus' for the government's policy response...Eventually, some three million people participated in the pre-Congress discussions", but "When the new electoral law was finalized… it dashed any hopes for a significant opening to alternative voices. The ban on campaigning was retained, and the nomination of provincial and national assembly candidates was entrusted to Candidacy Commissions. Through an elaborate process of consultation… the Candidacy Commissions… produced slates of nominees with just one candidate per seat. Voters only had the choice of voting yes or no. Thus, the election process at the provincial and national levels avoided the possibility of even implicit policy differences among candidates."

=== Cuba ===
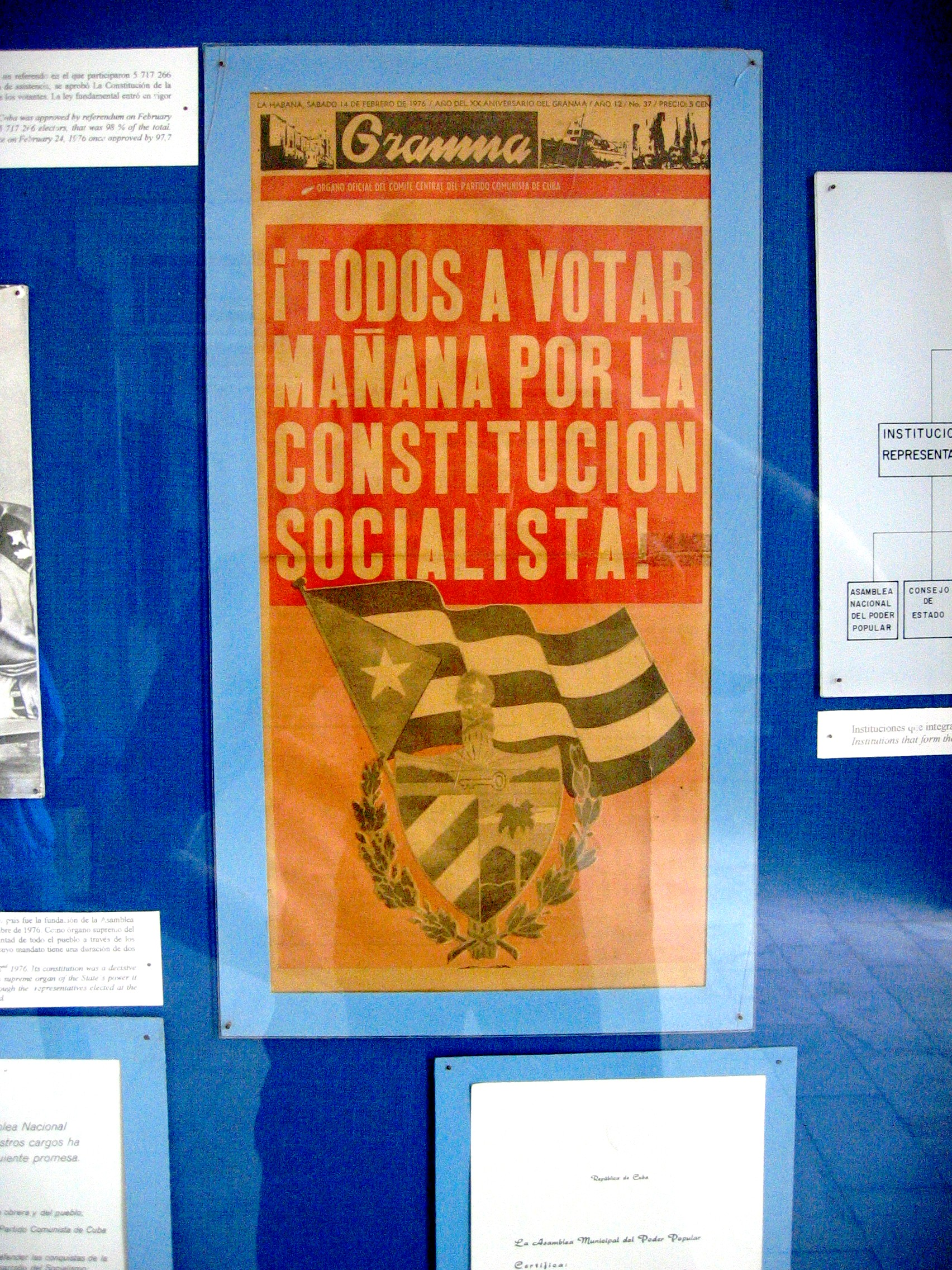
Front page of Granma, 14 February 1976. The title translates to "All will vote tomorrow for the socialist constitution!"

Fidel Castro made many statements affirming that Cuba is a democracy or has democratic features. In 1960, Castro made a speech to the General Assembly referring to Cuba in relation to other Latin American nations, "We are speaking of democracy. If Government is of people and democratic, people can be consulted, as we are doing here. What is more an example of pure democracy than meetings such as this one. If they cannot call such meetings they are not democracies." Castro continued "Those who want to see people’s democracy let them come here and see this. We can speak to America and the world because we speak in names of a whole nation." In this 1960 speech, Castro also criticized many Latin American liberal democracies, describing them as a "Pretense of democracy", as, he claimed, they did not allow such gatherings.

In 2006, President of Cuba's National Assembly, Ricardo Alarcón de Quesada, stated: "At some moment, US rhetoric changed to talk of democracy ... For me, the starting point is the recognition that democracy should begin with Pericles's definition – that society is for the benefit of the majority – and should not be imposed from outside."

Cuba justifies the existence of only one political party by arguing that the PCC "is not a political party in the traditional sense… it is not an electoral party; it does not decide on the formation or composition of the government. It is not only forbidden to nominate candidates but also to be involved in any other stage of the electoral process… The PCC’s role is one of guidance, supervision and of guarantor of participatory democracy."

The Cuban government describes the full Cuban electoral process as a form of democracy. The Cuban Ministry of External Affairs describes the candidate-selection process as deriving from "direct nomination of candidates for delegates to the municipal assemblies by the voters themselves at public assemblies," and points out that at the elections to the municipal assemblies, voters do have a choice of candidates. The ban on election campaigning is presented as "The absence of million–dollar election campaigns where resorting to insults, slander and manipulation are the norm."

=== United States ===
The United States does not consider Cuba a democracy and sees it as one of the primary reasons to continue its embargo against Cuba.

U.S. State Department: Country Reports on Human Rights Practices: "Candidates for provincial and national office must be approved in advance by mass organizations controlled by the government. In practice a small group of leaders, under the direction of the president, selected the members of the highest policy-making bodies of the CP, the Politburo, and the Central Committee."

"In 2003 there were national elections in which 609 candidates were approved to compete for the 609 seats in the National Assembly. The CP was the only political party allowed to participate in the elections. A small minority of candidates did not belong formally to the CP but were chosen through the same government-controlled selection process. The government saturated the media and used government ministries, CP entities, and mass organizations to urge voters to cast a "unified vote" where marking one box automatically selected all candidates on the ballot form.

During the year there were elections for nearly 15 thousand local representatives to the municipal assemblies. After the first run-off election, the government reported that 96.6 percent of the electorate had voted. While the law allows citizens not to vote, CDRs often pressured neighborhood residents to cast ballots. According to the Cuban Commission for Human Rights, the government blacklisted those who did not vote. Although not a formal requirement, in practice CP membership was a prerequisite for high-level official positions and professional advancement."

In 1999, the U.S.-government funded organization Freedom House initiated "the Cuban Democracy Project". The project was set up to support and encourage Cuban independent journalists, human rights activists, independent political parties, trade unions, and other organizations. Freedom House is solely responsible for the objectives and planning of the project and for its administration. Freedom House has also given Cuba the lowest rating in its: "Freedom in the World 2005" report for political rights, and the lowest rating in its "electoral democracy" category.

The Freedom House 2005 report states: "Cubans cannot change their government through democratic means. Fidel Castro dominates the political system, having transformed the country into a one-party state with the Cuban Communist Party (PCC) controlling all governmental entities from the national to the local level. Castro is responsible for every appointment and controls every lever of power in Cuba in his various roles as president of the Council of Ministers, chairman of the Council of State, commander in chief of the Revolutionary Armed Forces (FAR), and first secretary of the PCC. In October 2002, some eight million Cubans voted in tightly controlled municipal elections. On January 19, 2003, an election was held for the Cuban National Assembly, with just 609 candidates – all supported by the regime – vying for 609 seats. All political organizing outside the PCC is illegal. Political dissent, spoken or written, is a punishable offense, and those so punished frequently receive years of imprisonment for seemingly minor infractions."

=== European Union ===
Since 1996, official European Union policy towards Cuba has stated an objective "to encourage a process of transition to a pluralist democracy via constructive engagement with the Cuban Government." This goal is shared by all member states. The E.U. describes the Cuban decision-making process thus: "Elections for the National Assembly, where only candidates approved by the local authorities can partake, take place every five years. When the National Assembly, which meets twice-yearly, is not in session the 31-member Council of State wields legislative power. The Council of Ministers, through its 9-member executive committee, exercises executive and administrative power. Although the Constitution provides for independent judiciary, it explicitly subordinates it to the National Assembly and to the Council of State. Involvement in decision-making and implementation through non-political actors has been institutionalised through national organisations, linked to the Communist Party, representing farmers, youth groups, students, women, industrial workers, etc."

=== Organization of American States ===
Cuba was suspended from the Organization of American States (OAS) from 1962 to 2009. The Inter-American Commission on Human Rights, an organ of the OAS, prepared a report in 1997 that detailed the lack of free elections in Cuba, stating that this violated "the right to political participation set forth in Article XX of the American Declaration of the Rights and Duties of Man, which states textually that: "Every person having legal capacity is entitled to participate in the government of his country, directly or through his representatives, and to take part in popular elections, which shall be by secret ballot, and shall be honest, periodic and free."

"The nomination of candidates for election to the Municipal Assemblies is done by nominating assemblies, in which all voters are entitled to propose candidates. In practice, however, these district assemblies are usually organized by the Committees for the Defence of the Revolution or the Communist Party, which makes the selection of an opponent of the regime most unlikely.

=== Human rights organizations ===
In 2002 former U.S. President Jimmy Carter spoke in Havana with support from Human Rights Watch (An NGO headquartered in New York City) and representing the Carter Center. Whilst calling for democratic change, Carter also stressed that he was not using a U.S. definition of "democracy." he explained that "the term is embedded in the Universal Declaration of Human Rights, which Cuba signed in 1948. It is based on some simple premises: all citizens are born with the right to choose their own leaders, to define their own destiny, to speak freely, to organize political parties, trade unions and non-governmental groups, and to have fair and open trials."

The 2006 report from Human Rights Watch states:

Cuba remains a Latin American anomaly: an undemocratic government that represses nearly all forms of political dissent. President Fidel Castro, now in his forty-seventh year in power, shows no willingness to consider even minor reforms. Instead, his government continues to enforce political conformity using criminal prosecutions, long- and short-term detentions, mob harassment, police warnings, surveillance, house arrests, travel restrictions, and politically-motivated dismissals from employment. The end result is that Cubans are systematically denied basic rights to free expression, association, assembly, privacy, movement, and due process of law.

Human Rights defenders in Cuba from Human Rights First (An NGO headquartered in New York City) states:

Cuba remains the only country in the Western Hemisphere to reject democracy and effectively outlaw peaceful advocacy for human rights and democratic reforms. Independent civil society in Cuba – including human rights defenders, democracy activists, and independent journalists and scholars – are the targets of constant persecution. The universally-recognized rights to freedom of expression, association and assembly are systematically violated by the State and victims have virtually no means of redress within the judicial system."

The Swedish human rights group Civil Rights Defenders released a statement regarding the 2023 elections in Cuba that claimed "Cubans are allowed to vote but not to choose". This is reasoned to be because no opposition parties are allowed to run in Cuba, and debate amongst candidates is legally discouraged, removing all meaningful difference from the decision of Cuban voters.

=== Political figures ===
Many notable political figures have commented on Cuba and democracy. In 2006, Peruvian presidential candidate and Bolivarian Ollanta Humala stated, "Obviously, according to our standards Cuba does not qualify as a democracy," but added that Peru "is democratic; we have democratized poverty".

== See also ==
- Communist state
- Censorship in Cuba
- Cuban dissident movement
- One-party state
- Liaena Hernandez Martínez
