= List of presidents of the National Assembly of People's Power =

President of the National Assembly of People's Power
- Presidente de la Asamblea Nacional del Poder Popular
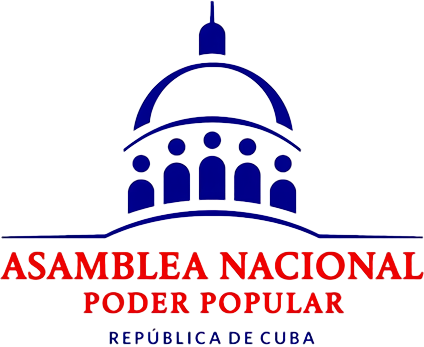
- Logo of the National Assembly of People's Power

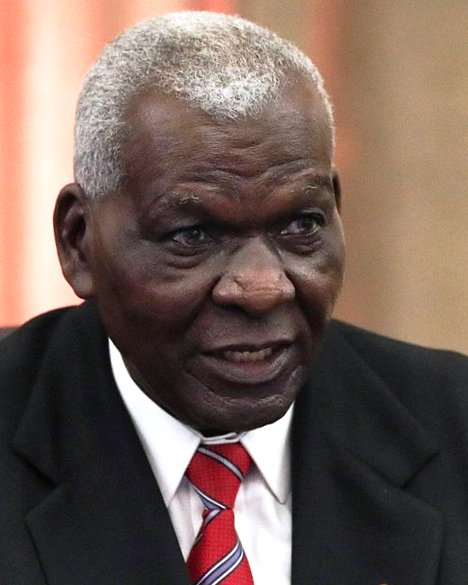
- Incumbent; Esteban Lazo Hernández since 24 February 2013
- National Assembly of People's Power
- Type: Speaker
- Member of: National Assembly of People's Power
- Seat: El Capitolio, Havana
- Appointer: National Assembly of People's Power
- Term length: Five years
- Constituting instrument: Constitution of Cuba (1976)
- Inaugural holder: Blas Roca Calderio
- Formation: 2 December 1976; 49 years ago
- Deputy: Ana María Mari Machado

This article lists the presidents of the National Assembly of People's Power (Spanish: Asamblea Nacional del Poder Popular), the legislative body of the Republic of Cuba, since its establishment in 1976.

The current president is Esteban Lazo Hernández, since 24 February 2013.

== List of officeholders ==
No.	Portrait	Name (Birth–Death)	Party	Tenure
1		Blas Roca Calderio (1908–1987)	PCC	1976–1981
2		Flavio Bravo Pardo (1921–1988)	PCC	1981–1988
3		Severo Aguirre del Cristo (1912–1992)	PCC	1988–1990
4		Juan Escalona Reguera (1921–2018)	PCC	1990–1993
5		Ricardo Alarcón de Quesada (1937–2022)	PCC	1993–2013
6		Esteban Lazo Hernández (born 1944)	PCC	2013–present

== See also ==
- President of Cuba
- Prime Minister of Cuba
