= VI Legislature of the National Assembly of People's Power of Cuba =

The VI Legislature of the National Assembly of People's Power of Cuba comprised from 2003 to 2008. The president was Ricardo Alarcón, vicepresident was Jaime Crombet Hernández-Baquero and Ernesto Suárez Méndez was secretary.

There were a total of 609 deputies, 390 men (64.04%) and 219 women (35,96%).

== See also ==
- Politics of Cuba
