= Ana María Mari Machado =

Cuban lawyer, judge and politician (born 1963)

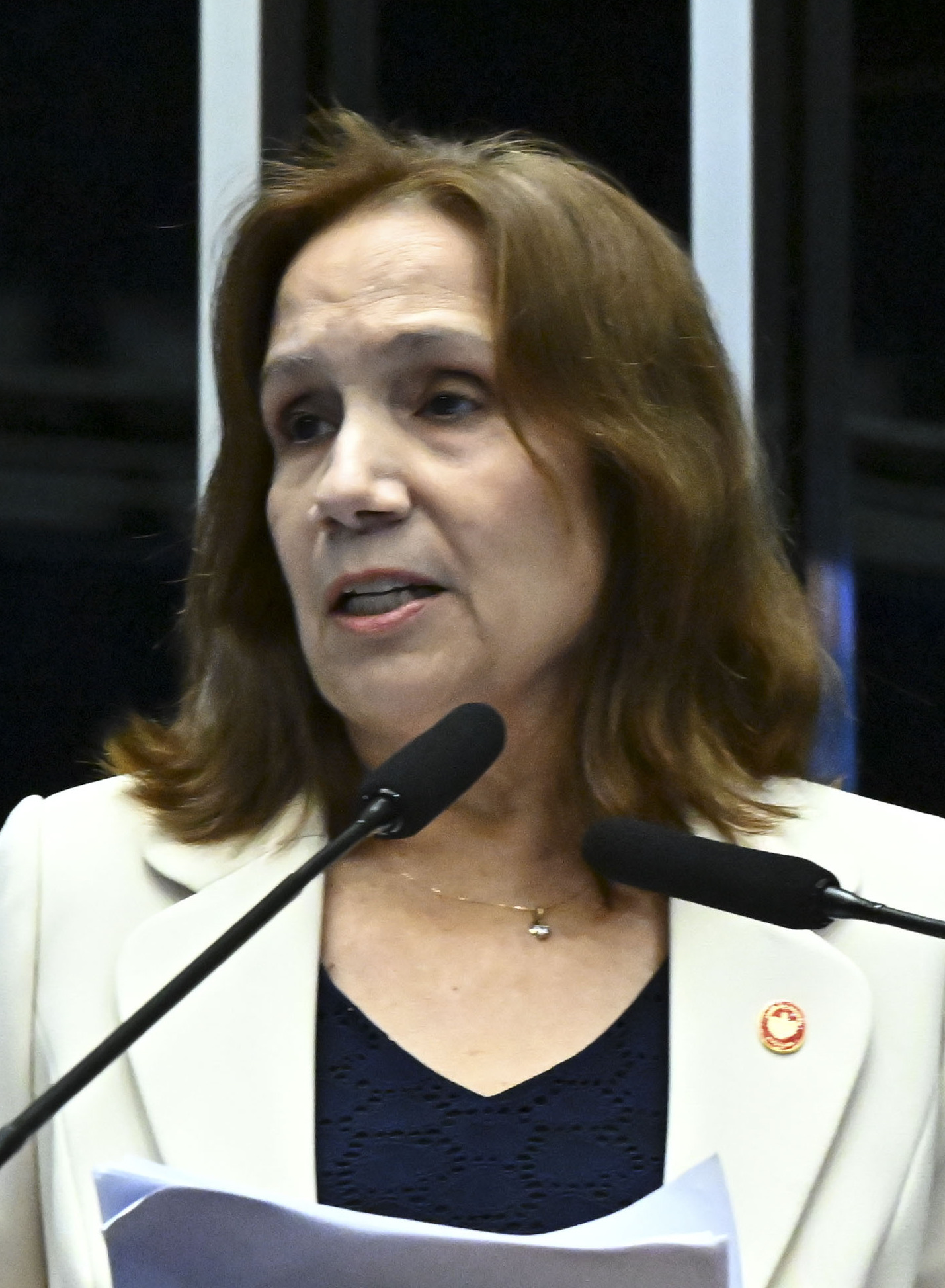
- Mari Machado during a working session of the 17th BRICS summit, July 2025

Vice President of the National Assembly of People's Power of Cuba
- Incumbent
- Assumed office 23 July 2012
- President: Esteban Lazo Hernández
- Preceded by: Jaime Crombet Hernández-Baquero
- Leader: Raúl Castro (First Secretary of the Communist Party); Miguel Díaz-Canel

Personal details
- Born: 22 May 1963 (age 63) Calabazar de Sagua, Cuba
- Party: Communist Party of Cuba
- Education: University "Marta Abreu" of Las Villas

Ana María Mari Machado (born 22 May 1963) is a Cuban lawyer, judge and politician. She has served as Vice President of the National Assembly of People's Power of Cuba since 2012 and of the Council of State since 2019. She was previously Vice President of the People's Supreme Court between 2009 and 2012.

== Early life ==
Mari Machado was born on 22 May 1963 in Calabazar de Sagua, Cuba. She graduated with a degree in Law from the University "Marta Abreu" of Las Villas and specialised in criminal law. She has further qualifications in politics, military studies and public administration.

During her time at university, Mari Machado was a member of the Student Work Brigades and the University Students' Federation, and before that, of the Federation of Secondary School Students. She joined the Young Communist League in 1986 and in 1993 joined the Communist Party of Cuba, where she held various leadership positions and has been a member of the Central Committee since 2011. She chaired the Committees for the Defense of the Revolution.

== Career ==
In September 1986, she began working as a legal advisor at a large agro-industrial company, until she joined the Villa Clara Provincial People's Court as a judge in 1992, a court she presided over between 2000 and 2009.

She was elected to the National Assembly of People's Power in the 2003 parliamentary election. Mari Machado was a member of the drafting committee of the 2019 constitution. Between 2009 and 2012, Mari Machado was vice president of the People's Supreme Court of Cuba until on 23 July 2012 was elected vice president of the National Assembly in 2013 and re-elected in 2018 and 2023. In 2019 she was elected to the Council of State.

Amid the 2026 Cuban crisis, in February 2026 some political analysts and opposition leader José Daniel Ferrer mentioned her, although also Oscar Pérez-Oliva Fraga, as a possible leader of the transition in Cuba that is being considered in the negotiations with the administration of US President Donald Trump.
