= Next Cuban parliamentary election =

- By March 2028

All 470 seats in the National Assembly of People's Power
Last election	470
Prime Minister before election
Manuel Marrero Cruz
PCC
Elected
Prime Minister
TBD

Parliamentary elections are scheduled to be held in Cuba by March 2028 to elect members of the National Assembly of People's Power.

== Electoral system ==
Voters must be Cuban citizens who have reached the age of 16 years, have not been declared mentally disabled by a court and have not committed a crime. All Cuban citizens who are at least 18 years of age and have possessed full political rights for at least five years prior to the elections are eligible to contest the elections.

Pre-candidates are proposed by the mass organizations at plenary sessions at the municipal, provincial and national level consisting of representatives of workers, youth, women, students, farmers and members of the Committees for the Defense of the Revolution. Candidacy commissions at each level, whose members are chosen by these mass organizations and presided over by a representative of the Central Union of Cuban Workers, compile the lists of candidates for each municipality from the pre-candidate proposals.

The final list of candidates, which corresponds to the number of seats to be filled, is drawn up by the National Candidature Commission taking into account criteria such as candidates' merit, patriotism, ethical values and revolutionary history. The municipal assemblies vote to either approve or reject some or all of the candidates; if a candidate is rejected, one is chosen from a reserve list also compiled by the National Candidature Commission. Up to 50% of candidates nominated may be municipal assembly delegates.

To be declared elected, candidates must obtain more than 50% of the valid votes cast in the constituency in which they are running. If this is not attained, the seat in question remains vacant unless the Council of State decides to hold a second round of voting.
