= 2018 Cuban parliamentary election =

- 11 March 2018

All 605 seats in the National Assembly of People's Power 303 seats needed for a majority
- Registered: 8,639,989
- Turnout: 85.65% (▼5.23pp)
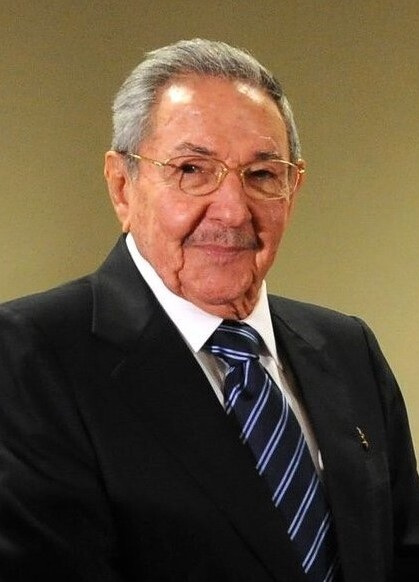
	First party
Leader	Raúl Castro
Party	PCC
Seats won	605
Seat change	▼7
Popular vote	5,620,713
Percentage	80.44%
Swing	▼0.86 pp
- Selective votes by province
President of the Council of Ministers before election
Raúl Castro
PCC
Elected President of the Council of Ministers
Miguel Díaz-Canel
PCC

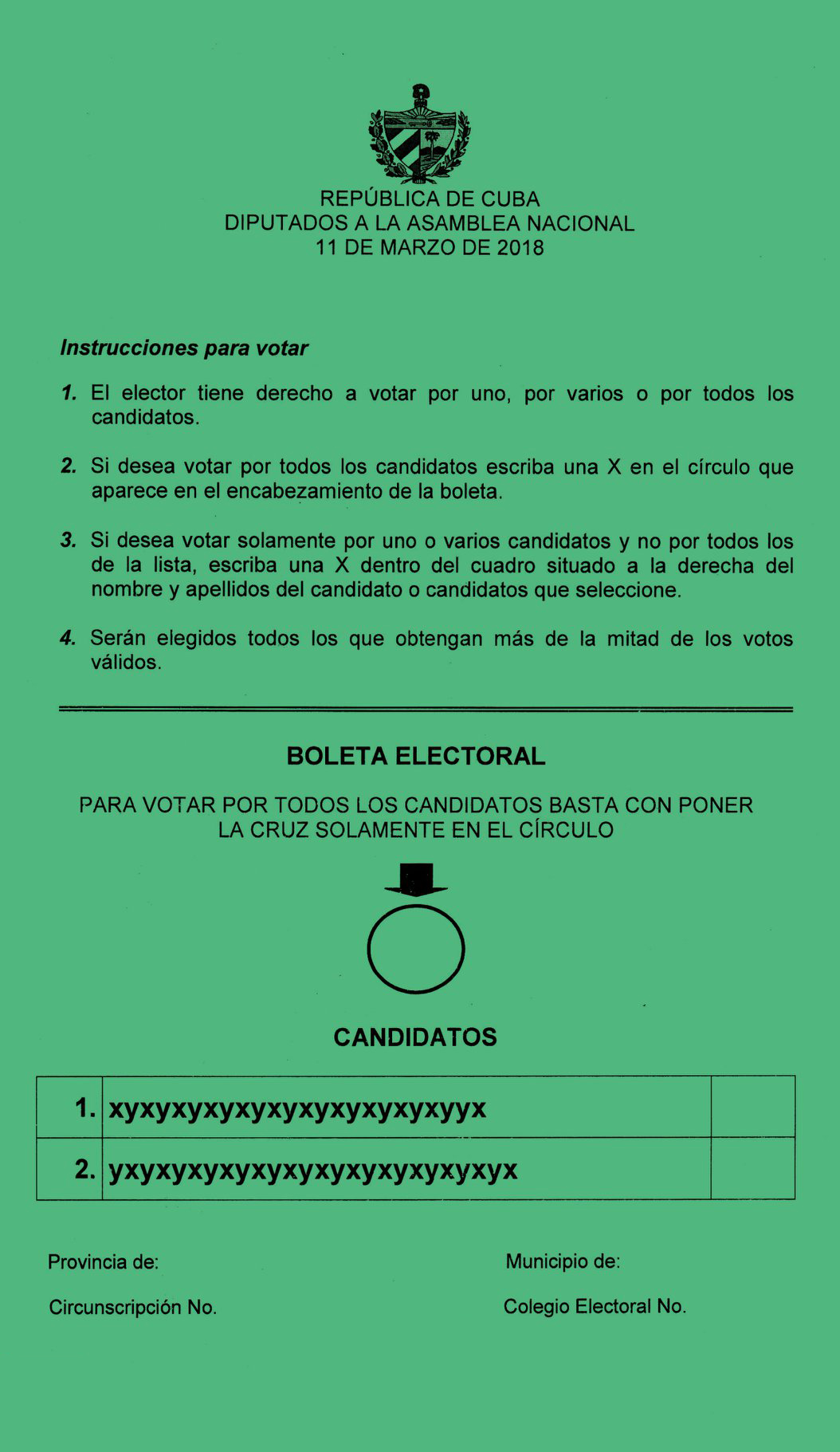
Ballot paper used in the election

Parliamentary elections were held in Cuba on 11 March 2018 to elect members of the National Assembly of People's Power. Prior to the elections, President Raúl Castro declared he would not be seeking a new term, and a new President of the Council of State will be elected by the National Assembly. His deputy, Miguel Díaz-Canel, was subsequently elected as the new president. However, Castro remained the First Secretary of the Communist Party of Cuba, the most senior position in the country.

== Electoral system ==
All Cuban citizens who are over the age of 18 years, and possess full political rights for at least five years prior to the election are eligible to partake within the election. 50% of candidates must be nominated by people from the municipality and elected by direct vote in local assemblies, where people decide who they consider to have the qualities to best represent them. The other 50% of candidates are proposed by candidacy commissions which comprise representatives of workers, youth, women, students, and farmers, as well as members of the Committees for the Defense of the Revolution. The final list of candidates, which corresponds to the number of seats to be filled, is drawn up by the National Candidacy Commission taking into account criteria such as candidates' merit, patriotism, ethical values, and revolutionary history.

Voter requirements are set within article 132 of the Cuban constitution. All voters must be Cuban citizens who have reached the age of 16 years, who have not been declared mentally disabled by a court, and who have not committed a crime. The electoral system is designed to give the winner of the election a majority. To be declared elected, one candidate must obtain more than 50% of the valid votes cast in the constituency in which they are running. If this is not attained, the seat in question remains vacant unless the Council of State decides to hold a second round of voting.

== Results ==
On 12 March, the Cuba National Election Commission (CNE) released preliminary results. In a press conference, the CNE reported that all 605 candidates had been elected as Deputies to the National Assembly. Selective votes refer to voters who voted for either their National Assembly Deputy, or their Provincial Representative, but not both.

Party	Votes	%	Seats
Communist Party of Cuba and affiliated (entire list)	5,620,713	80.44	605
Communist Party of Cuba and affiliated (selective votes)	1,366,328	19.56	605
Total	6,987,041	100.00	605
Valid votes	6,987,041	94.42	
Invalid votes	92,894	1.26	
Blank votes	319,956	4.32	
Total votes	7,399,891	100.00	
Registered voters/turnout	8,639,989	85.65	
Source: Granma

=== By province ===
Province	Registered voters	Votes cast		Valid votes		Blank		Invalid		Full list		Selective votes	
Province	Registered voters	Votes	%	Votes	%	Votes	%	Votes	%	Votes	%	Votes	%
Pinar del Río	452,557	406,119	89.74	379,920	93.55	23,006	5.66	3,193	0.79	305,462	80.40	74,458	19.60
Artemisa	393,143	350,063	89.04	324,559	92.71	18,907	5.40	6,597	1.88	255,543	78.74	69,016	21.26
La Habana	1,685,651	1,339,335	79.46	1,249,381	93.28	59,786	4.46	30,168	2.25	927,031	74.20	322,350	25.80
Mayabeque	296,126	268,505	90.67	250,362	93.24	12,775	4.76	5,368	2.00	204,511	81.69	45,851	18.31
Matanzas	561,179	475,331	84.70	451,222	94.93	17,920	3.77	6,189	1.30	346,461	76.78	104,761	23.22
Villa Clara	611,358	534,310	87.40	501,251	93.81	25,839	4.84	7,220	1.35	411,103	82.02	90,148	17.98
Cienfuegos	311,355	267,999	86.08	248,235	92.63	15,199	5.67	4,565	1.70	190,965	76.93	57,270	23.07
Sancti Spíritus	366,885	327,047	89.14	310,411	94.91	13,418	4.10	3,218	0.98	257,337	82.90	53,074	17.10
Ciego de Ávila	337,785	287,988	85.26	272,968	94.78	12,130	4.21	2,890	1.00	218,873	80.18	54,095	19.82
Camagüey	591,944	504,258	85.19	481,600	95.51	17,989	3.57	4,669	0.93	375,618	77.99	105,982	22.01
Las Tunas	404,948	353,654	87.33	337,536	95.44	13,430	3.80	2,688	0.76	283,174	83.89	54,362	16.11
Holguín	785,047	668,636	85.17	625,983	93.62	36,099	5.40	6,554	0.98	529,379	84.57	96,604	15.43
Granma	629,155	555,399	88.28	529,381	95.32	21,680	3.90	4,338	0.78	461,487	87.17	67,894	12.83
Santiago de Cuba	781,000	683,462	87.51	660,473	96.64	19,966	2.92	3,023	0.44	554,642	83.98	105,831	16.02
Guantánamo	368,864	321,155	87.07	309,834	96.47	9,559	2.98	1,762	0.55	256,748	82.87	53,086	17.13
Isla de la Juventud	62,992	56,630	89.90	53,925	95.22	2,253	3.98	452	0.80	42,379	78.59	11,546	21.41
Total	8,639,989	7,399,891	85.65	6,987,041	94.42	319,956	4.32	92,894	1.26	5,620,713	80.44	1,366,328	19.56
Source: Granma
