= 2008 Cuban parliamentary election =

- 20 January 2008

All 614 seats in the National Assembly of People's Power 308 seats needed for a majority
- Registered: 8,495,577
- Turnout: 96.89% (▼0.75pp)
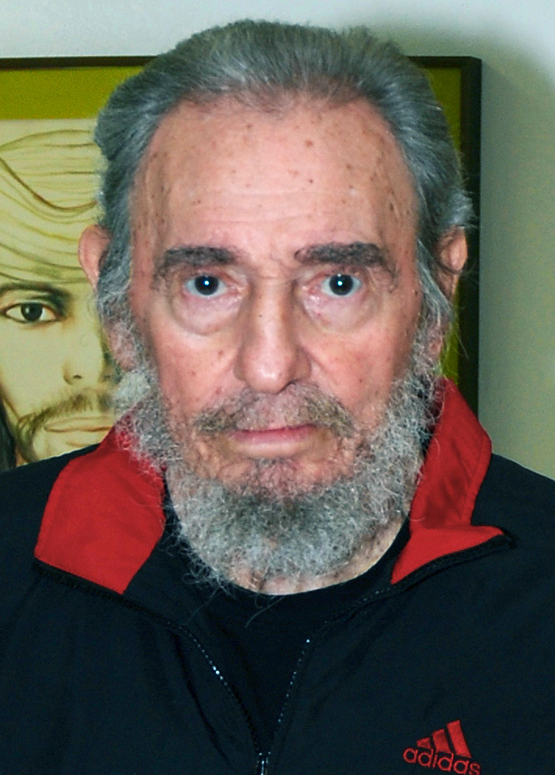
	First party
Leader	Fidel Castro
Party	PCC
Seats won	614
Seat change	▲5
Popular vote	7,125,752
Percentage	90.90%
Swing	▼0.45 pp
President of the Council of Ministers before election
Fidel Castro
PCC
Elected President of the Council of Ministers
Raúl Castro
PCC

Parliamentary elections were held in Cuba on 20 January 2008 to elect members of the National Assembly of People's Power. According to the Cuban electoral system, one candidate was nominated for each of the 614 seats in the Assembly, and candidates were elected if they received at least 50% of the vote.

The date of the election was announced on 20 November 2007. It was considered uncertain whether the ailing Fidel Castro would run for the Assembly, which he had to do in order to continue as President; it emerged in early December that he had been nominated for a seat. Since his illness began in 2006, Raúl Castro had been acting president.

== Results ==
María Esther Reus, the president of the National Electoral Commission and Minister of Justice, announced the results of the election on 24 January 2008. Turnout in the election was placed at 96.89%, with 8,231,365 voters participating; 95.24% of the votes cast (7,839,358) were valid. 91% of voters (7,125,752) cast a united ballot for all candidates, while 9% (713,606) chose to vote only for certain candidates. Of the invalid votes, 3.73% (306,791) were blank and 1.04% (85,216) were spoiled. The newly elected Assembly met for the first time on 24 February.

Raúl Castro was re-elected from the 2nd Eastern Front with 99.37% of the vote and Fidel Castro was re-elected from the 7th District of Santiago de Cuba with 98.26% of the vote. Vice-President Carlos Lage and President of the Assembly Ricardo Alarcón won their seats with 92.40% and 93.92% of the vote, respectively.

Party	Votes	%	Seats
Communist Party of Cuba and affiliated (entire list)	7,125,752	90.90	614
Communist Party of Cuba and affiliated (selective votes)	713,606	9.10	614
Total	7,839,358	100.00	614
Valid votes	7,839,358	95.24	
Invalid/blank votes	392,007	4.76	
Total votes	8,231,365	100.00	
Registered voters/turnout	8,495,577	96.89	
Source: Granma, IDEA

== Aftermath ==
On 24 February 2008, the National Assembly began sitting for its new term, and Raúl Castro was elected President Alarcón was elected as president of the National Assembly, while Jaime Crombet Hernández Vaquero was elected as its vice-president and Miriam Brito was elected as its secretary.

== See also ==
- Liaena Hernandez Martínez
