= 2023 Cuban parliamentary election =

- 26 March 2023

All 470 seats in the National Assembly of People's Power 236 seats needed for a majority
- Registered: 8,129,321
- Turnout: 75.84% (▼9.81pp)
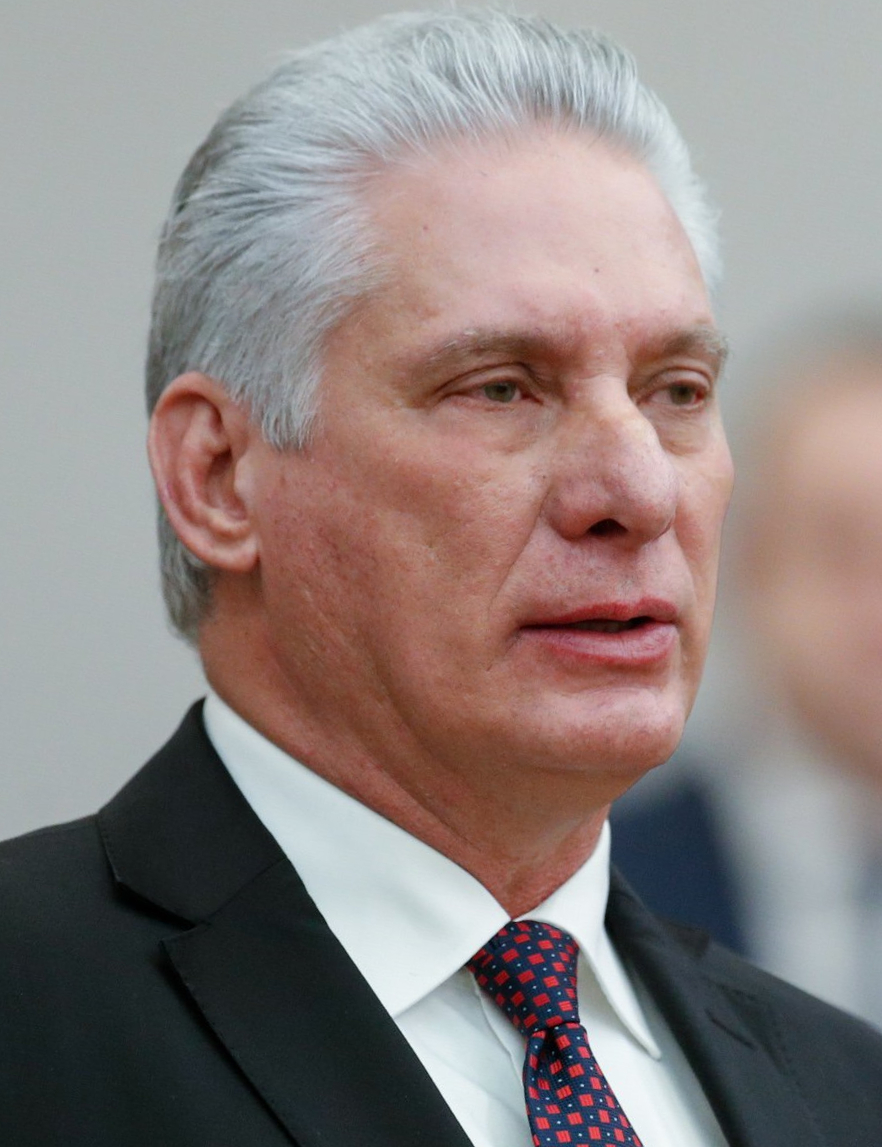
	First party
Leader	Miguel Díaz-Canel
Party	PCC
Leader since	19 April 2021
Last election	605
Seats won	470
Seat change	▼135
Popular vote	4,012,864
Percentage	72.10%
Swing	▼8.34 pp
- Results by province (Shaded by percentage of voters who cast votes for the entire list of candidates, as opposed to selective votes.)
Prime Minister before election
Manuel Marrero Cruz
PCC
Elected
Prime Minister
Manuel Marrero Cruz
PCC

Parliamentary elections were held in Cuba on 26 March 2023 to elect members of the National Assembly of People's Power.

== Background ==
In the 2018 parliamentary elections, 80% of voters voted for the full list and only 20% selected individual candidates.

Miguel Díaz-Canel succeeded Raúl Castro, brother of Fidel Castro, as the First Secretary of the Communist Party of Cuba on 19 April 2021, marking the end of the Castro era in Cuba.

== Electoral system ==
Voters must be Cuban citizens who have reached the age of 16 years, have not been declared mentally disabled by a court and have not committed a crime. All Cuban citizens who are at least 18 years of age and have possessed full political rights for at least five years prior to the elections are eligible to contest the elections.

Pre-candidates are proposed by the mass organizations at plenary sessions at the municipal, provincial and national level consisting of representatives of workers, youth, women, students, farmers and members of the Committees for the Defense of the Revolution. Candidacy commissions at each level, whose members are chosen by these mass organizations and presided over by a representative of the Central Union of Cuban Workers, compile the lists of candidates for each municipality from the pre-candidate proposals.

The final list of candidates, which corresponds to the number of seats to be filled, is drawn up by the National Candidature Commission taking into account criteria such as candidates' merit, patriotism, ethical values and revolutionary history. The municipal assemblies vote to either approve or reject some or all of the candidates; if a candidate is rejected, one is chosen from a reserve list also compiled by the National Candidature Commission. Up to 50% of candidates nominated may be municipal assembly delegates.

To be declared elected, candidates must obtain more than 50% of the valid votes cast in the constituency in which they are running. If this is not attained, the seat in question remains vacant unless the Council of State decides to hold a second round of voting.

== Results ==
Preliminary results showed that all 470 proposals that made up the candidacy were ratified by more than half of the valid votes cast by the population.

The election had a higher turnout than its predecessors, with 1.8% more participation compared to the 2022 Cuban Family Code referendum (74.12%) and 7.36% more than the municipal elections (68.56%). 6,164,876 Cuban citizens, which represents 75.92% of the total registered voters, voted in the election.

The elections also had an abstention rate of 24%, rising from 9% in 2013 and 16% in 2018. Some analysts have said that the figure represents the discontent some Cubans have with the economic crisis as well as a rise in political apathy. Further, the proportion of voters selecting specific candidates on the ballot rather than approving the entire list rose to almost 28%, more than 8% higher than the amount that had done so in 2018. This could indicate that voters are more skeptical of the party as a whole, while still supporting individual approved candidates.

Party	Votes	%	Seats
Communist Party of Cuba and affiliated (entire list)	4,012,864	72.10	470
Communist Party of Cuba and affiliated (selective votes)	1,552,776	27.90	470
Total	5,565,640	100.00	470
Valid votes	5,565,640	90.28	
Invalid votes	215,920	3.50	
Blank votes	383,316	6.22	
Total votes	6,164,876	100.00	
Registered voters/turnout	8,129,321	75.84	
Source: CEN, CEN
