= Rubén Remigio Ferro =

Cuban politician and judge (born 1960)

President of the People's Supreme Court
- In office 23 December 1998 – 18 December 2025
- Preceded by: José Raúl Amaro Salup
- Succeeded by: Oscar Manuel Silvera Martínez

Personal details
- Born: 1960 (age 65–66) Pinar del Río, Cuba
- Party: Communist Party of Cuba
- Education: University of Havana (M.L.)

Rubén Remigio Ferro (born 1960) is a Cuban politician and retired judge who served as President of the People's Supreme Court from 1998 to 2025. A member of the Communist Party, he was the first Afro-Cuban to hold the position.

Dr. Ferro was a judge and lawyer in the province of Pinar del Río, and a provincial judge in the 1980s and 1990s. He has been a diputado to the National Assembly of People's Power since 1998, representing the municipality of Mantua.

He was active in the Union of Communist Youth (UJC) and the Federation of University Students (FEU). In 1997, he was appointed Vice President of the People's Supreme Court and in 1998 was promoted to president.
