= Inés María Chapman Waugh =

Deputy Prime Minister of Cuba since 2019

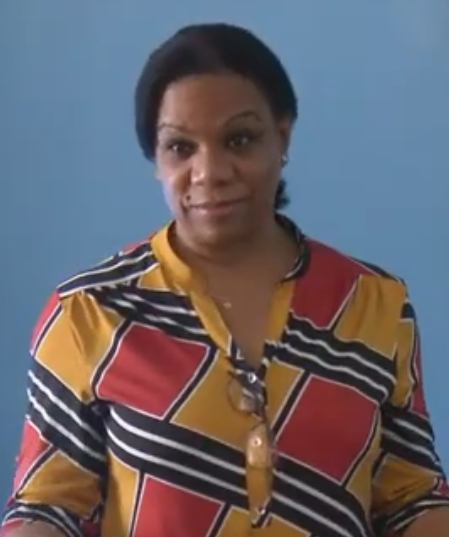
- On a government visit to Cienfuegos in 2022

Deputy Prime Minister of Cuba
- Incumbent
- Assumed office 19 December 2019
- Prime Minister: Manuel Marrero Cruz

Vice President of the Council of State
- In office 2018–2019

Personal details
- Born: 9 September 1965 (age 60)
- Party: Communist
- Education: José Antonio Echeverría Higher Polytechnic Institute
- Occupation: Engineer, politician

Inés María Chapman Waugh (born 9 September 1965) is a Cuban engineer and politician, who has served as one of the Deputies Prime Minister of Cuba since 2019. She served as Vice President of the Council of State between 2018 and 2019.

== Early life ==
Chapman was born on 9 September 1965. She graduated in hydraulic engineering from the José Antonio Echeverría Higher Polytechnic Institute and worked in Holguín until she became Provincial Delegate of the National Institute of Hydraulic Resources, which she later presided over. Chapman participated in the student movement and became president of the Federation of Secondary School Students and a member of the board of the University Student Federation. She also joined the Young Communist League.

In 2018, she was elected Vice President of the Council of State, which she was member between 2008 and 2019, and on 19 December 2019 she was elected Deputy Prime Minister of Cuba.

She is a member of the Central Committee of the Communist Party of Cuba since 2011 and a deputy since the 7th Legislature.
