= María del Carmen Concepción González =

Cuban politician

Cuban Minister of Food Industries
- Incumbent
- Assumed office March 2009

Personal details
- Party: Communist Party of Cuba

María del Carmen Concepción González (born 15 September 1957) is a Cuban politician and the Cuban Minister of Food Industries (2009–present). She was appointed as a result of the 2009 shake-up by Raúl Castro. She is a Deputy to the National Assembly of People’s Power. She was First Secretary of the Communist Party of Cuba in the Pinar del Río Province.
