= Liaena Hernández Martínez =

Cuban politician

Liaena Hernández Martínez is the youngest member of the Cuban National Assembly. During the opening of the 2008 Cuban National Assembly, after the 2008 legislative election, "Eighteen-year old legislator Liaena Hernandez Martínez read the oath in which each member of the new legislature committed their loyalty to the country and to observe and enforce the laws and all juridical norms." After the election Hernández stated, "Our main goal is to ready ourselves to fulfill our mission."
