= Severo Aguirre del Cristo =

President of the National Assembly of People's Power
- In office March 2, 1988 – March 2, 1990
- Preceded by: Flavio Bravo Pardo
- Succeeded by: Juan Escalona Reguera

Vice President of the National Assembly of People's Power
- In office December 27, 1986 – March 2, 1988

Ambassador of Cuba to the Soviet Union
- In office 1973–1979

Personal details
- Born: Silvio Ramírez; May 1, 1912 Havana, Cuba
- Died: January 13, 1992
- Party: Communist Party of Cuba
- Awards: Order of the Red Banner of Labour (Soviet Union, 1981); Lázaro Peña Order (Cuba, 1983)

Severo Aguirre del Cristo (born Silvio Ramírez; May 1, 1912 – January 13, 1992) was a Cuban communist politician, of African descent, and a carpenter by trade. He served as an ambassador to the Soviet Union and as a member of the National Assembly of People's Power.

In 1930, Aguirre joined the Communist Youth League of Cuba (CYLC), a youth organization associated with the Communist Party of Cuba (PCC). In 1931, at the First National Conference, he was elected as the Secretary-General of the CYLC, a position he held until the dissolution of the League in 1938. In December 1933, he was sent to the Executive Committee Plenum of the Young Communist International (YCI) in Moscow to secure the admission of the CYLC into the International. In 1935, he attended the VI Congress of the YCI, where he was elected a member of the YCI Executive Committee (under the pseudonym "Ramírez") representing the CYLC. In August 1938, he was a delegate to the Second World Youth Congress at Vassar College, New York.

In 1934, he joined the Communist Party of Cuba (PCC) and the same year, at the Second Congress, was elected a member of the Central Committee and the Political Bureau.

In 1937, he was part of the National Committee of the Revolutionary Union Party and was a leader of the People's Youth Group. In 1939, the Communist Revolutionary Union nominated him as a candidate to participate in the Constituent Assembly. In 1940, after the unification of the People's Youth Group with the Brotherhood of Young Cubans, he was the Secretary of the Joint National Commission and the General Secretary of the Executive Committee of the Cuban Revolutionary Youth.

In 1944, he was a member of the National Committee and the Executive Committee of the Popular Socialist Party (PSP), where he was responsible for political education. That same year, he presented a report at the PSP's Second National Assembly and was a member of the Editorial Board of the magazine Fundamentos.

He served as an advisor to the Guatemalan Labor Party. After the overthrow of the government of Jacobo Árbenz, he returned to Cuba (1954). He worked underground and was responsible for the peasant commission of the PSP (1954-1958). He maintained contacts, in the mountains of the Sierra Maestra and the Escambray, between the PSP and the Rebel Army. In 1959, he became Secretary of the PSP's Executive Committee. Also, in 1959, he represented the PSP at the 21st Congress of the Communist Party of the Soviet Union.

After the Cuban revolution, he was the head of the livestock department of the Instituto Nacional de Reforma Agraria (INRA). He was Deputy Minister of INRA and Dean of the Faculty of Agriculture at the University of Havana. A member of the Central Committee of the Communist Party of Cuba (1965), he was also the president of the National Council of the Cuban Movement for Peace and Sovereignty and vice president of the World Council for Peace. Ambassador of Cuba to the USSR (1973-1979), deputy of the National Assembly of People's Power and member of the Council of State of Cuba (1976). He was part of the PCC delegation to the XXV and 26th Congress of the Communist Party of the Soviet Union and to the commemoration of the 60th anniversary of the October Revolution (1977). He attended the World Assembly for Peace, Life, and Against Nuclear War (Prague, 1983), and the international scientific conference "The Great Socialist October Revolution and the national liberation movement of the peoples of Asia, Africa, and Latin America" (Baku, 1977). He participated in the VI conference of the Ibero-American Parliament (Sucre, 1988).

== Decorations ==
- Order of the Red Banner of Labour awarded to him by the Soviet Union in 1981
- Lázaro Peña Order awarded to him by Cuba in 1983
