= People's Supreme Court of Cuba =

Supreme judicial organ of Cuba

The People's Supreme Court (Tribunal Supremo Popular) is the supreme judicial organ of Cuba. It is elected by, and accountable to, the National Assembly of People's Power. The judiciary are independent from the executive branch, as all judges on every level are elected by the National Assembly; the provincial judges by provincial assemblies and the municipal judges by municipal assemblies. The current court dates to 1973 and replaced the earlier Supreme Court of Cuba c. 1898. Its current president is Oscar Manuel Silvera Martínez.

== Composition of Court ==
The People's Supreme Court is composed of a chief justice and president with his/her vice president and all professional and lay judges and is structured as follows: criminal, civil, administrative, labor, crimes-against-the-state, economic and military courts.

== Presidents of the Supreme Court ==
- Antonio Ysidoro González de Mendoza Bonilla, 4.5.1899 – 25.9.1900
- Rafael Félix De la Cruz Pérez, 25.9.1900 – 27.4.1904
- Juan Bautista Hernández Barreyro, 5.9.1904 – 12.12.1913
- José Antonio Pichardo Márquez, 17.12.1913 – 9.6.1917
- José Antolín del Cueto Pazos, 9.6.1917 – 17.6.1921
- Ángel Cirilo Betancourt Miranda, 21.6.1921 – 9.3.1925
- Juan Manuel Gutiérrez Quirós, 7.5.1925 – 6.4.1932
- José Gregorio Vivanco Hernández, 7.4.1932 – 19.8.1933
- Juan Federico Edelmann Rovira, 19.8.1933 – 5.4.1952
- Gabriel Emilio Pichardo Moya, 18.4.1952 – 27.7.1956
- Santiago Desiderio Rosell Leyte-Vidal, 28.9.1956 – 13.1.1959
- Emilio Florencio Menéndez Menéndez, 14.1.1959 – 21.12.1960
- Enrique Armando Hart Ramírez, 2.2.1961 – 30.6.1980
- José Raúl Amaro Salup, 1.7.1980 – 30.11.1998
- Rubén Remigio Ferro, 23.12.1998 –

== See also ==
- Cuban law
