= Esteban Lazo Hernández =

Cuban politician (born 1944)

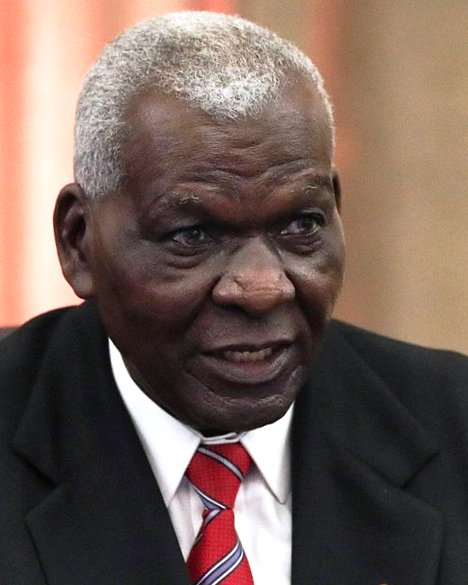
- Lazo Hernández in 2013

18th President of the Council of State
- Incumbent
- Assumed office 10 October 2019
- Vice President: Ana María Mari Machado
- Leader: Raúl Castro (First Secretary of the Communist Party); Miguel Díaz-Canel
- Preceded by: Miguel Díaz-Canel

President of the National Assembly of People's Power
- Incumbent
- Assumed office 24 February 2013
- Leader: Raúl Castro (First Secretary of the Communist Party); Miguel Díaz-Canel
- Preceded by: Ricardo Alarcón

Personal details
- Born: Juan Esteban Lazo Hernández; 26 February 1944 (age 82) Jovellanos, Matanzas, Republic of Cuba
- Party: Communist

Juan Esteban Lazo Hernández (born 26 February 1944) is a Cuban politician who has served as the 18th President of the Council of State since 2019, and a member of the National Assembly of People's Power (ANPP) since 1981. Prior to his presidency of the council he was vice president from 1992 to 2013.

== Early life and education ==
Juan Esteban Lazo Hernández was born in Jovellanos, Cuba, on 26 February 1944. He grew up in a rural environment and attended school until the 5th grade as his family was unable to afford to further his education. He worked as a farmer to support his family and was a 14 year old working at a rice mill when Fidel Castro won the Cuban Revolution.

== Career ==
Lazo joined the Rebel Youth Association upon its foundation and led it in his area. He joined the National Revolutionary Militia in 1961, and the Communist Party of Cuba (PCC) in 1963. He was a literacy teacher as part of the Cuban literacy campaign.

In 1964, Lazo became a member of the PCC Municipal Committee in Jovellanos. He was an organiser from until 1966, when he was selected to attend the Ñico López Higher Party School. He completed the program in 1967, and was appointed First Secretary of the Municipal PCC in San Pedro de Mayabón. He was promoted to organiser of the Regional Party Bureau in Colón, Cuba, in 1969, and later promoted to First Secretary of the PCC in Colón Province.

Lazo was moved to the provincial bureau in Matanzas Province in 1971, where he became a member of the provincial party bureau in 1979. He became Second Secretary of the provincial party committee in 1980, and then First Secretary in 1981. He was First Secretary of the party in Santiago de Cuba Province from 1986 to 1994, when he was made First Secretary of the party in Havana.

Lazo joined the Central Committee of the Communist Party of Cuba in 1980. Lazo was elected to he Secretariat of the Communist Party of Cuba when it was formed in 2006. At the 5th Congress of the Communist Party of Cuba he was the fourth highest ranking member, only behind Castro, Raúl Castro, and José Ramón Machado Ventura.

In the 1981 election Lazo received a seat in the National Assembly of People's Power (ANPP) representing Havana, which he retains to this day. He was elected as president of the ANPP in 2013. In the Council of State he was vice president from 1992 to 2013, and president since 2019.

== Political positions ==
Lazo was strongly involved in the Battle of Ideas following the return of Elián González to Cuba in 2000. He became director of the PCC's Ideological Department in 2003.

In 2019 he stated that the ANPP, at 605 seats, was too large and should be reduced in size. The total number of seats was reduced to 470 for the 2023-2028 assembly term, resulting from changes to the formula for assigning seats according to population.

== Awards and honors ==
- National Order of Mali, Grand Officer (2011)
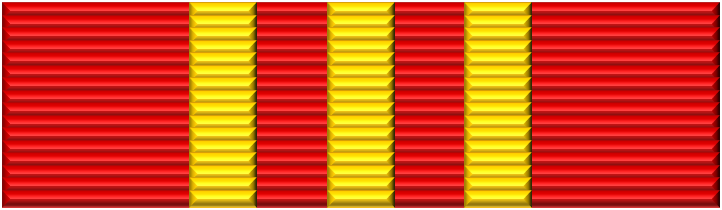
- Order of Ho Chi Minh (Vietnam, 2023)

== Works cited ==
- "Esteban Lazo Hernández". Barcelona Centre for International Affairs. Archived from the original on 25 June 2025.
- "Esteban Lazo Hernandez". Communist Party of Cuba. Archived from the original on 8 August 2007.
- "Juan Esteban Lazo Hernández". National Assembly of People's Power. Archived from the original on 25 June 2025.

Political offices
Preceded by Ricardo Alarcón	President of Cuban National Assembly; 2013–present	Succeeded by Incumbent
