= National Assembly of People's Power =

Unicameral legislature of Cuba

National Assembly of People's Power Asamblea Nacional del Poder Popular
- 10th Legislature
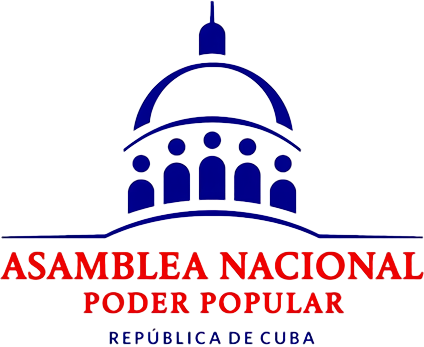

Type
- Type: Unicameral

History
- Founded: 2 December 1976; 49 years ago
- Preceded by: Congress of Cuba

Leadership
- President: Esteban Lazo Hernández, PCC member (Note: Assembly members sit as independents but all leaders are PCC members) since 24 February 2013
- Vice President: Ana María Mari Machado, PCC member (Note: Assembly members sit as independents but all leaders are PCC members) since 24 February 2013
- Secretary: José Luis Toledo Santander, PCC member (Note: Assembly members sit as independents but all leaders are PCC members) since 18 December 2025

Structure
- Seats: 470
- Political groups: Independents (470) (Note: Of 470 elected members, 442 are members of the Communist Party of Cuba but all sit as independents. Candidates for Cuba's parliamentary elections are nominated and supported by their local Committees for the Defense of the Revolution. Municipal assemblies then create a final list of candidates from the nominations and submit it to the National Candidacy Commission. "Given that the candidacy commissions have no party representatives, El Diario and The Economist were incorrect in reporting that the PCC had a formal role in selecting candidates.")
- Committees: 11 standing committees
- Length of term: 5 years

Elections
- Voting system: First past the post
- First election: 2 November 1976
- Last election: 26 March 2023
- Next election: 2028

Meeting place
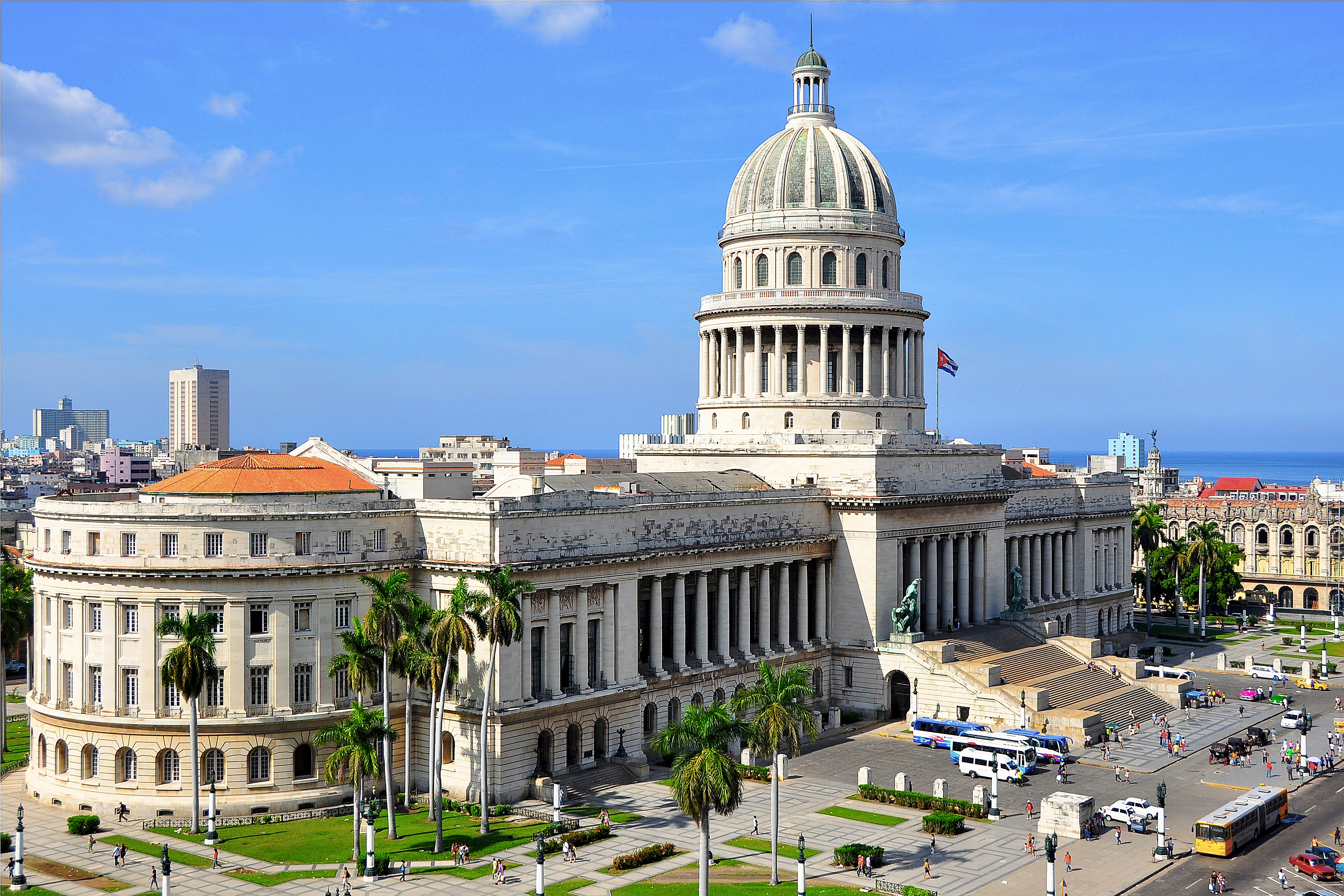
- El Capitolio, Havana

Website
- www.parlamentocubano.gob.cu

Constitution
- Constitution of Cuba

Rules
- Law on the Organization and Functioning of the National Assembly (Spanish)

The National Assembly of People's Power (Spanish: Asamblea Nacional del Poder Popular, shortened Asamblea Nacional or ANPP) is the supreme state organ of power of the Republic of Cuba. It is the only branch of government in the state, and per the principle of unified power, all state organs are subservient to it. It is currently composed of 470 representatives who are elected from multi-member electoral districts for a term of five years called consejos populares. The current president of the Assembly is Esteban Lazo Hernández. The Assembly only meets twice a year, with the 31-member Council of State exercising legislative power throughout the rest of the year. The most recent elections were held on 26 March 2023. The number of deputies was reduced from 605 to 470 for the 2023 election.

Liberal democracy is not practiced in Assembly elections in post-1959 revolutionary Cuba. The Communist Party of Cuba (PCC) is the "superior driving force of the society and the state" in the Constitution of Cuba, and all other political parties are illegal. There is only one candidate for each seat in the Assembly. However, the nomination process aims to ensure that elected candidates are rooted in and supported by the local community:

- Nominations take place at community meetings where residents select candidates by a show of hands;
- Anybody can be nominated to be a candidate. It is not a requirement to be a member of the Communist Party;
- Candidates' biographies are then displayed on community notice boards before the elections;
- No money can be spent promoting candidates and no political parties (including the Communist Party of Cuba) are permitted to campaign during elections;
- At the local level, a minimum of two and maximum of eight candidates may stand in each ward election.

Voters can either select individual candidates on their ballot, select every candidate, or leave every question blank, but voters have no option to vote against candidates. During the 2023 elections, 72% of voters supported every candidate on the ballot; 6% of votes were blank.

== Overview ==
The Assembly is a unicameral (one-chamber) parliament and the only body in Cuba that is vested with both constituent and legislative authority (although the government may pass decrees that have the force of law). It holds two regular sessions a year, which are public unless the Assembly itself votes to hold them behind closed doors for reasons of state. It has permanent commissions to look after issues of legislative interest at times when the Assembly is not in session.

Under the Constitution of Cuba, the Assembly is the "supreme body of state power" in Cuba. The National Assembly has the power to amend the Constitution; to pass, amend, and repeal laws; to debate and approve national plans for economic development, the State budget, credit and financial programs; and to set guidelines for domestic and foreign policies. It hears the reports from national government and administration agencies and can also grant amnesties. Among its permanent or temporary commissions are those in charge of issues concerning the economy, the sugar industry, food production, industries, transportation and communications, constructions, foreign affairs, public health, defense, and interior order. The National Assembly also has permanent departments that oversee the work of the Commissions, Local Assemblies, Judicial Affairs, and Administration.

== History ==
During the existence of the First Republic, Cuba had a bicameral legislature, that – consisting of the Senate (upper house) and House of Representatives (lower house) – was modeled after the United States. Its sessions were held in El Capitolio from 1929 to 1959.

The Assembly originated from the nationwide elections held in 1976 following the ratification of the 1976 Constitution. Elected officials, according to the procedures established by law, met for the first time on 2 December 1976, thus formally setting up the Cuban Parliament. The Constitution, approved in a constitutional referendum on 14 February 1976, empowered the National Assembly as the supreme body of State power.

== Elections ==
See main article: Elections in Cuba

The assembly representatives are elected from each district across Cuba every five years. Half of the candidates are nominated at public meetings before gaining approval from electoral committees, while the other half are nominated by public solidarity organizations (such as trade unions, farmers' organizations, and students' unions).

In keeping with the provisions of the Constitution, the Assembly itself elects the 31 members of the Council of State; their terms expire when a new Assembly is elected. The assembly elects the President and Vice President of the Republic, and also the Secretary of the Council of State, who must report to the National Assembly on all its work and tasks. It also elects the Prime Minister and the members of the Council of Ministers, the Chief Justice and members of the Supreme Court, and the Attorney General's Office of Cuba.

In concordance with the 2018-19 amendments to the Constitution, by right the President of the National Assembly is president of the Council of State ex officio, with the first vice president of the Council exercising his or her duties if absent. If absent from the duties of the presidency of the Assembly, the Vice President of the National Assembly serves the office.

== Composition ==
Up to 50% of the candidates must be chosen by the Municipal Assemblies. The candidates are otherwise proposed by nominating assemblies, which comprise representatives of workers, youth, women, students, and farmers, as well as members of the Committees for the Defense of the Revolution, after initial mass meetings soliciting a first list of names. The final list of candidates is drawn up by the National Candidature Commission taking into account criteria such as candidates' merit, patriotism, ethical values, and revolutionary history.

== Legislatures ==
Legislature	Years	President	Vice president	Secretary
I Legislature	1976–1981	Blas Roca Calderío	Raúl Roa	José Arañaburu García
II Legislature	1981–1986	Flavio Bravo Pardo	Jorge Lezcano Pérez	José Arañaburu García
III Legislature	1986–1993	Flavio Bravo Pardo (1986–d. 1987); Severo Aguirre del Cristo (1987–d. 1990); Juan Escalona Reguera (1990–1993)	Severo Aguirre del Cristo (1986–d. 1990); Zoila Benitez de Mendoza (1990–1993)	Ernesto Suárez Méndez
IV Legislature	1993–1998	Ricardo Alarcón	Jaime Crombet Hernández-Baquero	Ernesto Suárez Méndez
V Legislature	1998–2003	Ricardo Alarcón	Jaime Crombet Hernández-Baquero	Ernesto Suárez Méndez
VI Legislature	2003–2008	Ricardo Alarcón	Jaime Crombet Hernández-Baquero	Ernesto Suárez Méndez
VII Legislature	2008–2013	Ricardo Alarcón	Jaime Crombet Hernández-Baquero (2008–2012); Ana María Marí Machado (2012–2013)	Miriam Brito Saroca
VIII Legislature	2013–2018	Esteban Lazo Hernández	Ana María Marí Machado	Miriam Brito Saroca
IX Legislature	2018–2023	Esteban Lazo Hernández	Ana María Marí Machado	Homero Acosta Álvarez (2023–2025) José Luis Toledo Santander (2025–present)
X Legislature	2023–present	Esteban Lazo Hernández	Ana María Marí Machado	Homero Acosta Álvarez (2023–2025) José Luis Toledo Santander (2025–present)

== See also ==
- Congress of Cuba, bicameral legislature of Cuba 1902–1958
- Politics of Cuba
- List of legislatures by country
