= List of liberal parties by country =

This article gives information on liberalism worldwide. It is an overview of parties that adhere to some form of liberalism and is therefore a list of liberal parties around the world.

== Introduction ==
What constitutes a liberal party is highly debatable. In the list below, it is defined as a political party that adheres to the basic principles of political liberalism. This is a broad political current, including left-wing, centrist and right-wing elements. All liberal parties emphasise individual rights, but they differ in their opinion on an active role for the state. This list includes parties of different character, ranging from classical liberalism to social liberalism, conservative liberalism to national liberalism.

Several conservative and/or Christian-democratic parties, such as the British Conservative Party, Germany's Christian Democratic Union and Spain's People's Party, are also considered to be neoliberal leaning or have strong liberal conservative and/or classical liberal factions, whereas some conservative parties, such as Poland's Law and Justice and Hungary's Fidesz, favour more state intervention but also support free-market solutions. Conversely, some social-democratic parties, such as the British Labour Party and the Italian Democratic Party, include liberal elements. Social liberalism and social conservatism are not mutually exclusive, and some parties espouse socially liberal economic policies, while maintaining more socially conservative or traditionalist views on society: examples of this include Finland's Centre Party (see also Nordic agrarian parties) and Ireland's Fianna Fáil, both members of the Alliance of Liberals and Democrats for Europe Party (ALDE Party). In the United States, the two major political forces, the Republican Party and the Democratic Party, are to some extent, liberal (see Liberalism in the United States and Modern liberalism in the United States).

Many liberal parties are members of the Liberal International and/or one of its regional partners, such as the ALDE Party in Europe, the Liberal Network for Latin America and the Council of Asian Liberals and Democrats. Generally, membership in these international organizations is an indication that that party is indeed liberal. However, other international organisations, such as the International Democrat Union and the Centrist Democrat International, and regional organisations, such as the European People's Party, the Alliance of European Conservatives and Reformists, the European Democratic Party and the Christian Democrat Organization of America, also have liberal or liberal leaning parties as significant proportions of their membership.

Not all the parties using the "Liberal" or "Freedom" labels are actually liberal. Moreover, some parties, such as the Freedom Party of Austria, were originally liberal, but have since tilted toward a populist direction and abandoned most of the tenets of liberalism. Finally, some parties, such as the United States Republican Party, Australia's Liberal Party or Norway's Progress Party are liberal mainly from an economic point of view rather than a social point of view (see economic liberalism, libertarianism and right-libertarianism).

== International organizations of parties ==
- Liberal International
- Alliance of Liberals and Democrats for Europe Party
- Liberal Network for Latin America
- Council of Asian Liberals and Democrats
- Africa Liberal Network
- Arab Liberal Federation

== Parliamentary parties and other parties with substantial support ==
This list includes also parties that were represented in the last previous legislature and still exists as well as some banned or exiles parties (Cuba). Liberals might be active in other parties, but that is no reason to include a party.
See the remarks above about the criteria. Minor parties are listed below

=== Africa ===
Liberalism is a relatively new current for Africa. Traditionally it only existed more or less in Egypt, Senegal and especially South Africa.

- Algeria: There are very few liberal political parties. Ahd 54 and the Algerian Natural Law Party may be considered liberal. The main Berber party, the Rally for Culture and Democracy (French: Rassemblement pour la Culture et la Démocratie) could be considered to embrace some liberal values.
- Angola: the Liberal Democratic Party (Portuguese: Partido Liberal Democrático, member LI) is a small liberal party.
- Benin: the Rebirth Party of Benin (French: Parti de la renaissance du Bénin), might be considered a liberal party, but its exact profile is not available. The Cowry Forces for an Emerging Benin (French: Forces Cauris pour un Bénin émergent) are a centrist party alliance with liberal elements.
- Burkina Faso: the Alliance for Democracy and Federation (French: Alliance pour la Démocratie et la Fédération), might be considered a liberal party, but its exact profile is not available.
- Cape Verde: the Movement for Democracy (Portuguese: Movimento para a Democracia, member CDI), is a liberal and Christian-democratic party
- DR Congo: the Future of Congo (French: Avenir du Congo) is a liberal party of the current Prime Minister
- Egypt: the Free Egyptians Party (Hizb El Masriyin El Ahrar) and the New Wafd Party (Hizb al-Wafd-al-Jadid) could be considered "liberal parties". The newest liberal party in Egypt is El-Ghad Party (Tomorrow's Party) led by the opposition leader Ayman Nour . Also, the newly established Free Egyptians Party. See for more information: Liberalism in Egypt.
- Equatorial Guinea: the National Democratic Union of Equatorial Guinea (Spanish: Unión Democrática Nacional de Guinea Ecuatorial, member LI) claims to be a liberal party.
- Gambia: the United Democratic Party, might be considered a liberal party, but its exact profile is not available.
- Ghana: the New Patriotic Party is a right of center liberal party that is unclear about its international affiliations.
- Guinea: the Union of Democratic Forces of Guinea (French: Union des forces démocratiques de Guinée, member LI, ALN) and the Union of Republican Forces (French: Union des forces républicaines, member LI, ALN) are the main opposition parties.
- Ivory Coast: the Rally of the Republicans (French: Rassemblement des Republicains, member LI, CDI) is the liberal, main government party.
- Kenya: the Orange Democratic Movement (observer LI) might be considered a liberal party.
- Malawi: the liberal character of the United Democratic Front is despite its membership of the LI disputable. The Democratic Progressive Party was formed in 2005 by President Bingu wa Mutharika after a dispute with the UDF. There were allegations that members of the former governing UDF did not adequately tackle corruption. It is unclear if the party will be ideological or personalist in style.
- Morocco: two center-right parties, the Constitutional Union (French: Union Constitutionnelle) and the Popular Movement (French: Mouvement Populaire) are both member of the LI. However both are conservative in social issues, something abnormal for a true liberal party. The National Rally of Independents (observer LI, member ALN), founded in 1978 as a royalist party, is nowadays a liberal party.
- Mozambique: the Liberal and Democratic Party of Mozambique (Portuguese: Partido Liberal e Democrático de Moçambique) and the Social Liberal and Democratic Party (Portuguese: Partido Social-Liberal e Democrático) claim to be liberal parties, but both lost parliamentary representation.
- Senegal: the Senegalese Democratic Party (French: Parti Démocratique Sénégalais, member LI) is a liberal party with a strong personalist character. See for more information: Liberalism in Senegal.
- Seychelles: the Seychelles National Party (observer LI) is a liberal party.
- Sierra Leone: the People's Movement for Democratic Change (member ALN, observer DUA) can be considered as a liberal party. It is the country's third largest party but lost parliamentary representation in 2012.
- South Africa: the Democratic Alliance (member LI) is a liberal party. See for more information: Liberalism in South Africa.
- Sudan: the Liberal Party of Sudan (member ALN, AAFD) is a social-liberal party struggling for human rights and a social market economy.
- Tanzania: the Civic United Front (Swahili: Chama Cha Wananchi), member LI) and the United Democratic Party, observer LI are liberal parties.
- Tunisia: the Social Liberal Party (French: Parti social-libéral, observer LI) is a more or less liberal party.
- Zambia: the main opposition party, the United Party for National Development (observer LI) takes a liberal position in the political spectrum.
- Zimbabwe: liberalism is not organized, but the left-leaning opposition Movement for Democratic Change includes liberals and social democrats opposed to the ruling ZANU–PF party.

=== The Americas ===
In many Latin American countries, liberalism and radicalism have been associated with generally left-of-center political movements such as Colombia's Liberal Party, historically concerned mostly with effecting government decentralization and regional autonomy (liberals were influential in the total dissolution of at least two defunct countries, the United Provinces of Central America and Gran Colombia) and separation of church and state. At times, the anti-clerical and secularist stances promoted by Latin American liberals have resulted in limitations on the civil rights of clergy or others associated with the Church (as in Mexico, where law still prohibits priests from public office). Liberalism in North America has a different background.

- Argentina: the Radical Civic Union historically was a centrist progressive-liberal party, while nowadays it adheres to the Socialist International and its platform is a combination of liberal and social democratic ideas. The UCR's long-time rivals have been Peronism and the Peronist-inspired Justicialist Party. Recreate for Growth had been a short lived attempt to form a market liberal party and has observer status in the Liberal International. This party was in alliance with conservative-liberal Republican Proposal. Also smaller parties, such as the Union of the Democratic Centre, the Progressive Democratic Party, the Liberal Party of Corrientes and the Democratic Party of Mendoza, adhere to conservative-liberal principles. On the libertarian side, stands the Liberal Libertarian Party (dissolved) and the Libertarian Party (now) whose focus is on free markets and individual rights.
- Aruba: the character of the Aruban Liberal Organization (Organisacion Liberal Arubiano) is not clear. The party lost parliamentary representation in the 2005 election.
- Bahamas: the dominant party is the left of center liberal Progressive Liberal Party.
- Bolivia: the Liberal Party was dominant until 1952. (Main article: Liberalism in Bolivia).
- Brazil: Liberalism (in a general, international acceptance) is represented mainly by think tanks and organizations. Livres, a think tank and member of Liberal International is the most famous one. Also, there are the Brazilian segments of LOLA and Students For Liberty. There are no mainstream parties currently holding unambiguous liberal principles. Three parties label themselves as "liberal": the Liberal Front Party (Portuguese: Partido da Frente Liberal), actually renamed Brazil Union (Portuguese: União Brasil) in 2022, being a populist-conservative party, the Liberal Party (Portuguese: Partido Liberal), also as a populist-conservative party with links to religious organizations, being the party of former Brazilian president Jair Bolsonaro, and the New Party (Portuguese: Partido Novo), as a free market-conservative party, affiliated with the bolsonarism movement. (Main article: Liberalism in Brazil).
- Canada: Liberal refers mainly to the policies and ideas of the Liberal Party of Canada/French: Parti Libéral du Canada (member LI), the most frequent governing party of Canada for the last century and one of the most successful liberal parties in the world. The Liberal Party of Canada has generally adhered to modern liberalism, supporting a welfare state, and is regarded as a centrist to centre-left party in the Canadian context although some provincial parties such as the Quebec Liberal Party combine liberalism with conservative ideas. (Main article: Liberalism in Canada).
- Chile: the Social Democrat Radical Party (Spanish: Partido Radical Social-Democráta, member SI) was originally a left-of-center liberal party, but nowadays it is a social democratic party. The Liberal Party of Chile (Spanish: Partido Liberal de Chile, member LI) is a left-of-center social liberal party. Political Evolution (Evopoli) is a center-right political party, part of the governing coalition and a member of RELIAL. (Main article: Liberalism and radicalism in Chile).
- Colombia: the liberal current developed into the Colombian Liberal Party (Spanish: Partido Liberal Colombiano, despite its name an active member of the SI), which is a left of center, somewhat populist party, somewhere between liberalism and social democracy. Newer parties like Partido Cambio Radical and Social National Unity Party have taken classical liberal ideas. (Main article: Liberalism in Colombia).
- Costa Rica: the Libertarian Movement Party (Spanish: Partido Movimiento Libertario) was originally a classical liberal (libertarian) party but has become conservative on social issues as abortion and same-sex marriage. The Liberal Progressive Party (Spanish: Partido Liberal Progresista) was founded in 2016 is an economically and socially liberal party. (Main article: Liberalism in Costa Rica).
- Cuba: it has been legal to form political parties since 1992, but only the Communist Party of Cuba is allowed to be the ruling party. The three liberal parties Liberal Democratic Party (Spanish: Partido Liberal Democratico, observer LI), Democratic Solidarity Party (Partido Solidaridad Democratica, observer LI), Cuban Liberal Union (Unión Liberal Cubana, member of the Liberal International) and the Cuban Liberal Movement (Movimiento Liberal Cubano) are located in Havana, but they are not allowed to participate in elections.
- Dominican Republic: the originally left-wing Dominican Liberation Party (Spanish: Partido de la Liberacíon Dominicana) developed into a center liberal party. The Liberal Reformist Party (Partido Reformista Liberal) is also a center liberal party.
- Ecuador: the Alfarista Radical Front (Frente Radical Alfarista) and the Ecuadorian Radical Liberal Party (Spanish: Partido Liberal Radical Ecuatoriana) are two small remainders of the traditional liberal current. (Main article: Liberalism and radicalism in Ecuador).
- Greenland: Atassut is a right-of-center liberal party. The Democrats (Greenlandic: Demokraatit) and the Cooperation Party (Greenlandic: Suleqatigiissitsisut) are social liberal parties. They all oppose separation from Denmark.
- Grenada: the National Democratic Congress is a center liberal party.
- Honduras: the Liberal Party of Honduras (Partido Liberal de Honduras, member LI and RELIAL) is the traditional center liberal party. (Main article: Liberalism in Honduras).
- Mexico: liberalism is represented by the New Alliance Party (Spanish: Partido Nueva Alianza), member LI). (Main article: Liberalism in Mexico).
- Nicaragua: the liberal character of the right-wing Constitutionalist Liberal Party (Spanish: Partido Liberal Constitucionalista, former member LI) is disputable. (Main article: Liberalism in Nicaragua).
- Panama: the Nationalist Republican Liberal Movement (Spanish: Partido Movimiento Liberal Republicano Nacionalista) is a center-right liberal party. (Main article: Liberalism in Panama).
- Paraguay: the Authentic Radical Liberal Party (Spanish: Partido Liberal Radical Auténtico, member LI and RELIAL) is a center liberal party. (Main article: Liberalism and radicalism in Paraguay).
- Peru: classical liberal Liberty Movement and Liberal Party of Peru. In Fujimorian-occupied Peru: social liberal Justice Party.
- Puerto Rico: the Popular Democratic Party (Spanish: Partido Popular Democrático) is a left of center liberal party.
- Suriname: the Democratic Alternative '91 (Dutch: Democratisch Alternatief '91) is a center liberal party.
- Trinidad and Tobago: the People's National Movement is a liberal centrist to centre-left party.
- United States: the primary use of the term liberal is at some variance with European and worldwide usage. In the United States today, it is most associated with the definition of modern liberalism, which is a combination of social liberalism, public welfare and a mixed economy, which is in contrast to classical liberalism. In the Third Party System, the primary liberal groups (which by that point still meant classical liberal) were the Bourbon Democrats and the Liberal Republicans, the latter of which evolved into the Mugwumps; they both supported free trade and free markets, and opposed political corruption. By 1884, both groups had come to support the Democratic Party under the leadership of the liberal Bourbon Grover Cleveland. However, when William Jennings Bryan took over the Democratic Party, there was a substantial move towards populism and progressivism; the last hurrah of the Bourbons was the nomination of Alton Parker in 1904. Despite this, most Democrats, including Woodrow Wilson and Franklin Roosevelt, continued to call themselves liberals, framing social liberal ideas as positive liberties, in contrast to the negative liberties that can only be avoided through a lack of government intervention. Starting in the 1980s, the conservatives and modern liberals began to adopt more classically-liberal economic perspectives through fusionism and the Third Way respectively. Today, the Democratic Party is sometimes identified as the liberal party within the broader definition of liberalism thus putting it in contrast with most other parties listed here. Democrats advocate for more social freedoms, affirmative action, and a mixed economy (and therefore modern liberalism). The Republican Party experiences a somewhat fractured economic viewpoint with some members supporting strong free-market and libertarian views (and therefore economic liberalism) and others championing pro-business and economic nationalist stances, though both sectors typically mix their fiscal views with strong aspects of social conservatism. The Libertarian Party is the third largest political party in the United States, (though still only getting 1–2% of the vote in congressional elections), and particularly centers itself on free markets and individual liberty, which is more in line with classical liberalism. (Main article: Liberalism in the United States and Modern liberalism in the United States)
- Uruguay: liberalism organized itself in the nineteenth century in the Colorado Party (Spanish: Partido Colorado) nowadays a heterogeneous party, divided in factions ranging from conservative to social-democratic; however, its general profile is more or less liberal.
- Venezuela: liberalism was a strong force in the nineteenth and beginning of the twentieth century. Nowadays there are three important classical liberal movements (still no parties): Organization for the Liberal Democracy in Venezuela (Spanish: Organización por la Democracia Liberal en Venezuela), a classical liberal, pro-capitalism think-tank; Liberal Democratic Movement (Movimiento Demócrata Liberal) and "Rumbo Propio para el Zulia" from Maracaibo, Zulia, a classical liberal autonomist movement. They are going to create together a political party in the next years. (Main article: Liberalism in Venezuela).

=== Asia ===
Liberalism has or had some tradition in some countries. Nowadays it is a growing current in East Asia, but in many of these countries liberals tend not to use the label liberal.

Armenia, Azerbaijan, Cyprus, Georgia, and Russia are listed under Europe.

- Bangladesh: the Bangladesh Liberal Democratic Party is a small liberal democratic party.
- Bhutan: The People's Democratic Party (Bhutan) is described as a liberal party.
- Cambodia: the Candlelight Party (Khmer: គណបក្សភ្លើងទៀន, romanized: anakpak Phlerng Tean, member CALD), claims to be a more or less liberal party, though some dispute this and consider it a xenophobic party.
- Hong Kong: the Democratic Party is a liberal party, strongly emphasizing the need of democratic reforms. The Civic Party is also a liberal party. The Liberal Party is often considered to be a conservative, pro-business party.
- India: Liberalism is currently unrepresented. However two centrist parties, INC and NCP have been described as liberal.(Main article: Liberalism in India).
- Iran: liberalism is forbidden and its members have been killed in the past. Liberal Party of Iran is forced to exist in exile (based in EU). (Main article: Liberalism in Iran).
- Israel: Yesh Atid (Hebrew: יש עתיד, lit. 'There Is a Future', member of LI) is the second biggest party in the Israeli Parliament with a strongly anti-clerical, liberal ideology. In the early 2000s, some Likud and Labor members formed a new liberal party called Kadima. The center-right Likud calls itself a National-Liberal Party.
- Japan: The Constitutional Democratic Party of Japan is widely described as liberal, social-liberal party. The Japan Innovation Party has been described as libertarian. Reiwa Shinsengumi is sometimes described as liberal, or "liberal-populist." Similarly, the Social Democratic Party is sometimes considered liberal. The disbanded Liberal Party (1998) was neoliberal, classical libertarian, and Your Party was a neoliberal party. (Main article: Liberalism in Japan).
- South Korea: The Democratic Party of Korea is a left-wing liberal party. The predecessors of Democratic Party, which included the disbanded Uri Party (Yeollin Uri Dang), the UNDP (Daetonghap Minju Sindang), Democratic Party), Democratic United Party and Creative Korea Party are left-wing liberal parties. But there are also cases like conservative-liberal parties such as the People Party, Bareunmirae Party, and New Reform Party (South Korea) that are allied with conservatives. (Main article: Liberalism in South Korea).
- Lebanon: the National Liberal Party (Hizb al-Ahrar al-Watani) is a liberal pro-independence party.
- Malaysia: the Parti Gerakan Rakyat Malaysia (Malaysian People's Movement Party, member CALD) seems to be a more or less liberal party.
- Mongolia: the Civil Will–Green Party (Irgenii Zorig-Nogoon Nam, member LI, CALD, GG) was founded in 2012 by a merger of the market liberal Civil Will Party (Irgenii Zorig Nam) and the Mongolian Green Party (Mongolyn Nogoon Nam) who both had worked for protecting human rights and democracy. The new party combines market liberal and green values.
- Myanmar: the National League for Democracy, observer CALD, a party with liberal democratic elements, became the biggest parliamentary party at the latest election. It won a parliamentary majority in the 1990 election but the result was not recognised by the military and the party was suppressed until 2012.
- Pakistan: the Pakistan Peoples Party is a progressive center left political party.
- Philippines: the Liberal Party, member LI, CALD) is a center liberal party. (Main article: Liberalism in the Philippines).
- Singapore: the populist, liberal Singapore Democratic Party (member CALD) is not represented in parliament.
- Sri Lanka: the Liberal Party of Sri Lanka is a small liberal party.
- Taiwan: the Democratic Progressive Party (Min-chu Chin-pu Tang, member LI, CALD) is a left-liberal party, with it being the biggest liberal party in Taiwan.
  On the other hand, the Taiwan Solidarity Union is a characterised primarily by its Taiwanese nationalism and derives its membership from both the Chinese Nationalist Party's former moderate and Taiwan-oriented fringe and DPP supporters disgruntled by the party's moderation on the question of Taiwanese sovereignty. Its liberal character is questionable, although it is part of the DPP's left-of-centre and pro-Taiwanese Independence Pan-Green alliance (in contrast with the conservative Chinese Nationalist Party (Kuomintang) and People First Party.)
  (Main article: Liberalism in Taiwan).
- Thailand: the Democrat Party (Pak Prachatipat, member LI, CALD) is a conservative-liberal party. (Main article: Liberalism in Thailand).
- Turkey: Liberalism was never a strong force, though there were some significant liberal parties. Liberal Democratic Party (Turkish: Liberal Demokrat Parti), a classical liberal party, was founded in 1994. (Main article: Liberalism in Turkey).

=== Europe ===
At a pan-European level liberalism exists in some form within generally all members of the Alliance of Liberals and Democrats for Europe Party (ALDE), within most members of the European Democratic Party (EDP), within many members of the European People's Party (EPP) and some members of the Alliance of European Conservatives and Reformists (AECR).

- Albania: Two parties could be considered to embrace liberal values: the Democratic Alliance Party (Albanian: Partia Aleanca Demokratike, member LI, ALDE) and the Unity for Human Rights Party (Albanian: Partia Bashkimi për të Drejtat e Njeriut, Greek: Κόμμα Ένωσης Ανθρωπίνων Δικαιωμάτων), which is the party of the ethnic minorities. (Main article: Liberalism in Albania.)
- Andorra: the Liberal Party of Andorra (Catalan: Partit Liberal d'Andorra, member LI, ALDE) is a centre-right liberal party and currently the second-largest political party by parliamentary representation.
- Armenia: traditional liberalism made a comeback following the 2018 Velvet Revolution. After the 2018 Armenian parliamentary election, Bright Armenia, a liberal political party, became the official opposition in the National Assembly and is a member of the ALDE. Following the 2021 Armenian parliamentary election, Bright Armenia lost all representation in the National Assembly and currently acts as an extra-parliamentary party. Other liberal parties in Armenia include the Armenian Constructive Party, Armenian National Movement Party, European Party of Armenia, For The Republic Party, Liberal Democratic Union of Armenia, and the Liberal Party. (Main article: Liberalism in Armenia.)
- Austria: the NEOS – The New Austria and Liberal Forum (German: NEOS – Das Neue Österreich und Liberales Forum, member ALDE) was formed in 2014 as a merger of NEOS formed in 2012 and the Liberal Forum (German: Liberales Forum, LiF) formed in 1993. The Liberal Forum had split from the Freedom Party of Austria (German: Freiheitliche Partei Österreichs, FPÖ), which had become a right-wing nationalist party, but was previously liberal or national-liberal, and was a member of the Liberal International until 1993. (Main article: Liberalism in Austria.)
- Azerbaijan: liberal parties are minor in regard to the political system. Liberal political parties in Azerbaijan include; Azerbaijan Democratic Party, Azerbaijan Liberal Party, Azerbaijan National Independence Party, Azerbaijani Popular Front Party, Justice Party, Modern Equality Party, Musavat and the Republican Alternative Party.
- Belarus: one of the main opposition parties is the liberal United Civic Party of Belarus (Belarusian: Аб'ядна́ная грамадзя́нская па́ртыя Белару́сі, romanized: Abjadnanaja hramadzianskaja partyja Biełarusi).
- Belgium: the party system is divided by language. In the Flemish community, Open Flemish Liberals and Democrats (member LI, ALDE), comprising both market and social liberals, is one of the dominant parties. In the French community, the centre-right Reformist Movement (member LI, ALDE) is one of the major parties. Affiliated with this party is the Party for Freedom and Progress in the German community, and until 2011 DéFI a regionalist party in the Brussels region whose aim is the expansion of linguistic rights of French-speakers. (Main article: Liberalism in Belgium.)
- Bosnia and Herzegovina: liberalism is weak, because of the domination by ethnic parties. A small and rather unsuccessful liberal party is the Liberal Democratic Party (Liberalno demokratska stranka, associate ALDE). More successful is the social liberaI and multi-ethnic Our Party (Naša stranka, associate ALDE).
- Bulgaria: Liberalism used to be represented by the mainly Turkish minority party Movement for Rights and Freedoms (Dviženie za prava i svobodi) and the National Movement for Stability and Progress (Nacionalno Dviženie za Stabilnost i Vazhod), both taking a more or less liberal position. Two parties split from NDSV: Bulgarian New Democracy (BND) and The New Time (Novoto Vreme). The party DOST split from MRF, but failed to get into parliament. The party LEADER (now called Bulgarian Democratic Center) also failed to get into parliament. After the 2020-2021 bulgarian protests liberal parties became the main alternative to GERB. Yes, Bulgaria! was the leading party in the Democratic Bulgaria coalition. United People's Party and We Are Coming (also known as the Poisonous Trio) were members of the Stand Up! Mafia, Get Out! and later Stand Up.BG! We Are Coming coalitions. Later the party We Continue The Change (Produlzhavame Promyanata, PP) became the leading liberal political party. (Main article: Liberalism and radicalism in Bulgaria.)
- Croatia: liberalism is very divided. One could distinguish seven parties: the centre Croatian People's Party – Liberal Democrats (Croatian: Hrvatska narodna stranka – Liberalni demokrati, member ALDE), its two splinters: centrist People's Party – Reformists (Croatian: Narodna stranka – Reformisti, member EDP) and the left-of-centre Civic Liberal Alliance (Croatian: Građansko-liberalni savez, member ALDE); left centrist and Istrian regionalist Istrian Democratic Assembly (Istarski demokratski sabor – Dieta Democratica Istriana, member ALDE, observer LI) and the right-of-centre Croatian Social Liberal Party (Croatian: Hrvatska socijalno-liberalna stranka, member LI, ALDE); as well as two which have become prominent more recently, starting from the local level: Centre (Croatian: Centar, member ALDE) and Focus (Croatian: Fokus, member ALDE). (Main article: Liberalism in Croatia).
- Cyprus: the centre-right Liberal Democrats www.liberalscy.org (Fileleftheri Dimokrates, member of the Interlibertarians) and the centre-left United Democrats (Enomeni Dimokrates, member ALDE) are considered liberal parties. See also Liberalism in Cyprus.
- Czech Republic: Mayors and Independents, the Czech Pirate Party and TOP 09 are considered liberal parties. (Main article: Liberalism in the Czech Republic).
- Denmark: most parties support liberalism in one form or another, and three parties mark themselves as liberal: the centrist Social Liberal Party (Danish: Radikale Venstre, member LI, ALDE), the much larger conservative-liberal Venstre (member LI, ALDE) and the liberal–libertarian Liberal Alliance. (Main article: Liberalism and radicalism in Denmark).
- Estonia: the Estonian Reform Party (Estonian: Eesti Reformierakond, member LI, ALDE) is a free market liberal party. The liberal character of the Estonian Centre Party (Estonian: Eesti Keskerakond, ex-member ALDE) can be disputed. (Main article: Liberalism in Estonia).
- Faroe Islands: the conservative-liberal Union Party (Faroese: Sambandsflokkurin) and the social liberal Self-Government (Faroe Islands) (Faroese: Sjálvstýri) were or are aligned with the Danish liberal parties. In addition, there are two separatist parties: the liberal-conservative People's Party (Fólkaflokkurin, member AECR) and the market liberal Progress (Faroese: Framsókn), founded in 2011.
- Finland: the dominant LI and ALDE member party is the centrist and agrarian Centre Party (Suomen Keskusta), however the liberal character of this party is questioned. In actuality, the Centre Party has long since become socially more conservative than the liberal-conservative National Coalition Party, since it opted not to support same-sex marriage. The Swedish minority party Swedish People's Party (Svenska Folkpartiet i Finland, member LI, ALDE) has a clearer liberal profile. The original liberal current was until 2011 organized in the Liberals (Liberaalit), after 1995 a very small extra-parliamentary party. At the autonomous islands of Åland the Liberals for Åland (Liberalerna på Åland) and the centrist agrarian Ålandic Centre (Åländsk Center, member ALDE) are the dominant forces. (Main article: Liberalism and centrism in Finland).
- France: the Radical Movement (French: Mouvement radical, MR, member ALDE) was formed in 2017 as a merger of the Radical Party (French: Parti radical, PR), founded in 1901, and the Radical Party of the Left (French: Parti radical de gauche, PRG), which had split from the PR in 1971. In 2019, the PRG re-emerged from the MR. France had a liberal tradition, generally associated to Republicanism, from which the right and the left of the political spectrum were generated. On the right-wing there were the Republicans, which organized themselves in 1901–03 in the moderate-liberal Democratic Republican Alliance and in the liberal-conservative Republican Federation; on the left-wing the Radicals, which founded the Republican, Radical and Radical-Socialist Party in 1901. After World War II, the Republicans gathered in the liberal-conservative National Centre of Independents and Peasants, from which the conservative-liberal Independent Republicans seceded in 1962. The original centre-left Radical Party was a declining force in French politics until 1972 when it joined the centre-right, causing the split of Radical-Socialist faction and the foundation of the Radical Party of the Left, closely associated to the Socialist Party. In 1978 both the Republican Party (successor of the Independent Republicans) and the Radical Party were founding components, along with the Centre of Social Democrats, of the Union for French Democracy (UDF), an alliance of liberal and Christian-democratic forces. The Republican Party, re-founded as Liberal Democracy in 1997 and re-shaped as a free-market libertarian party, left UDF in 1998 and merged into the Gaulist Union for a Popular Movement (UMP), of which it represented the libertarian wing. Also the Radical Party left UDF in 2002 in order to join UMP, of which it is the main social-liberal component, as an associate party. The Liberal Alternative was formed in 2006. In 2017, Emmanuel Macron formed the liberal party La République En Marche! and won the presidential and the National Assembly elections. The Democratic Movement (French: Mouvement démocrate, MoDem, member EDP), the successor of the Union for French Democracy, joined forces with La République En Marche!. (Main article: Liberalism and radicalism in France).
- Georgia: Ahali (Georgian: ახალი), Droa (Georgian: დროა, affiliate ALDE), European Georgia (Georgian: ევროპული საქართველო, observer EPP), Lelo (Georgian: ლელო, member ALDE), Republican Party of Georgia (Georgian: საქართველოს რესპუბლიკური პარტია, affiliate ALDE) and Strategy Aghmashenebeli (Georgian: სტრატეგია აღმაშენებელი, member ALDE) are liberal pro-European parties. The United National Movement (Georgian: ერთიანი ნაციონალური მოძრაობა, member IDU, associate EPP) is a liberal-conservative pro-Western party oriented on North-Atlantic integration.
- Germany: the Free Democratic Party (Freie Demokratische Partei, member LI, ALDE) is a centre to centre-right classical liberal party. It supports laissez-faire and free market economics and is seen to be closer to the centre-right conservative CDU/CSU alliance on economic issues than the centre-left SPD, but closer to the SPD and the Greens on issues such as civil liberties, education, defense, and foreign policy. (Main article: Liberalism in Germany).
- Gibraltar: the Liberal Party of Gibraltar (member LI, ALDE) is a social-liberal party favouring Gibraltar's self-determination.
- Greece: the liberal current disappeared, leading to liberals joining the centre-right New Democracy, est. in 1974 and the centre-left PASOK, est. in 1974. Smaller parties such as the social-liberal The River (Greek: Το Ποτάμι, To Potami) and the Union of Centrists (Greek: Ένωση Κεντρώων, EDP member, Enosi Kentroon), claimer of Venizelist heritage, became the leading liberal forces. Meanwhile, new liberal initiatives have been taken, like e.g. the purely liberal Liberal Alliance (Greek: «Φιλελεύθερη Συμμαχία», Fileleftheri Simmakhia), est. in 2007. (Main article: Liberalism in Greece).
- Hungary: the Momentum Movement (Momentum Mozgalom) is a centrist and liberal political party, the Hungarian Liberal Party (Magyar Liberális Párt) is an extra-parliamentary market liberal party. (Main article: Liberalism and radicalism in Hungary).
- Iceland: the Progressive Party (Icelandic: Framsóknarflokkurinn, member LI) is an agrarian-centrist party. In 2016 Viðreisn emerged as a liberal split from the governing Independence Party. (Main article: Liberalism and centrism in Iceland).
- Ireland: Fine Gael (member CDI and EPP) is a centre-right, liberal-conservative party whose platform encompasses low-tax economic policies and socially liberal stances on issues such as same-sex marriage, abortion, divorce, medical cannabis, and assisted dying. In recent years the traditionally Irish nationalist centrist Fianna Fáil (member LI and ALDE) has adopted liberal politics on both social and economic ones; however, the party membership remains conservative on social issues. The Progressive Democrats were a liberal party with an emphasis on market economics in existence from 1985 to 2009.
- Isle of Man: the Liberal Vannin Party (observer LI) is the only party represented in the House of Keys since most Members are elected as independents. It favours accountability and transparency in government and a further devolution from the United Kingdom.
- Italy: liberals are now divided over the centre-right Forza Italia (originally a merger of liberal and Christian-democratic forces in 1994, and reconstituted in 2013 from The People of Freedom), the Civic Choice party founded in 2013 to support then-Prime Minister Mario Monti, Democratic Centre and Alliance for Italy, small social-liberal parties, and various minor extra-parliamentary movements including the libertarian Act to Stop the Decline and Italian Radicals (member ALDE Party). Also the centrist-populist Italy of Values is a member ALDE Party, although it is not classifiable as a liberal party in whichever sense. Most members of the late Italian Liberal Party (refounded as a very small party in 2004) and many former members of the Italian Republican Party joined Forza Italia, which is often presented and defined in Italy as a liberal party. This is the reason why the term 'liberals' is more often used when speaking of the centre-right coalition, dominated by Forza Italia, which combines economic liberalism with freedom of conscience on ethical matters. (Main article: Liberalism and radicalism in Italy).
- Kosovo: the New Kosovo Alliance (Albanian: Aleanca Kosova e Re, member ALDE), Liberal Party of Kosovo (Albanian: Partia Liberale e Kosoves, associate ALDE), and the Alternative (Alternativa) are considered to be liberal parties, although the second one doesn't seem to have much support. The Independent Liberal Party (Samostalna liberalna stranka, member LI) is a liberal party of the Serbian minority.
- Latvia: the Development/For! is a classical-liberal political party (member ALDE). Development/For! had 13 seats in 13. saeima. Eliminated Latvia's First Party/Latvian Way party (member LI, ALDE) was a centre-right liberal party. (Main article: Liberalism in Latvia).
- Lithuania: the Liberal Movement (Lithuanian: Lietuvos Respublikos Liberalų sąjūdis) and the Liberal and Centre Union (Lithuanian: Liberalų ir centro sąjunga, member LI), ALDE) are a centre liberal parties. (Main article: Liberalism in Lithuania).
- Luxembourg: the Democratic Party (Luxembourgish: Demokratesch Partei/French: Parti démocratique/German: Demokratische Partei, member LI, ALDE) is the traditional liberal party. (Main article: Liberalism in Luxembourg).
- Malta: the AD+PD was formed in 2020 as a merger of the green Democratic Alternative and the social-liberal Democratic Party. The party has 2 seats in the parliament and was formed by dissatisfied members of the Labour Party. There are two minor liberal parties: Alleanza Liberal-Demokratika Malta and Alpha Liberal Democratic Party.
- Moldova: liberalism is divided over the conservative-liberal Liberal Party (Partidul Liberal, member ALDE) and the market liberal Liberal Reformist Party (Partidul Liberal Reformator, observer LI), which splintered of the Liberal Party to stay in government and be part of the Pro-European Coalition in 2013. (Main article: Liberalism in Moldova).
- Montenegro: liberalism is organized in the Liberal Party of Montenegro (Liberalna Partija Crne Gore, observer LI, member ALDE), more or less a liberal party. (Main article: Liberalism in Montenegro).
- Netherlands: liberalism is divided between two parties. The social-liberal Democrats 66 (Dutch: Democraten 66, member LI, ALDE) and the conservative-liberal People's Party for Freedom and Democracy (Dutch: Volkspartij voor Vrijheid en Democratie, member LI, ALDE). Furthermore, in 2004 the GroenLinks started profiling itself as a 'leftist liberal' party, a shift from its socialist roots. (Main article: Liberalism in the Netherlands).
- North Macedonia: the liberals are divided over the Liberal Democratic Party (Macedonian: Либерално-демократска Партија, romanized: Liberalno-demokratska Partija, member LI, ALDE), part of the left of centre government coalition, and the Liberal Party of Macedonia (Macedonian: Либерална партија на Македонија, romanized: Liberalna partija na Makedonija), part of the right of centre opposition coalition. (Main article: Liberalism in North Macedonia).
- Norway: the Liberal Party (Norwegian: Venstre, member LI, ALDE) is a centrist liberal party. The Capitalist Party (Norwegian: Liberalistene) is a newer party grounded in classical liberalism. Høyre is a Liberal Consercative party) (Main article: Liberalism in Norway).
- Poland: the Democratic Party (member ALDE) was a centre-liberal party. It did not succeed in entering parliament in the 2005 election. Civic Coalition is considered economically liberal or conservative-liberal, however, it is more conservative in terms of ideology. Created in 2015, liberal Modern (member ALDE) entered parliament in 2015 elections. Currently, Poland 2050 is considered a liberal party. It runs together with more conservative Polish People's Party as a Third Way, which is a member of the ruling coalition. Also Confederation Liberty and Independence is economically liberal yet strongly conservative socially party (Main article: Liberalism in Poland).
- Portugal: liberalism was a strong force in history, namely during the Liberal Revolution of 1820. In contemporary times, the Social Democratic Party was once a Liberal International member, but left the organisation in 1996, and has taken a more conservative orientation since then, joining the European People's Party. However, many observers still see it as a conservative-liberal party. The Earth Party (former member ALDE, WEP) is a party that advocates both market economy and environmentalism. The most recent party is Iniciativa Liberal that also became a member of the ALDE, in early December 2017. The party was created as an association in 2016, and was approved as a party by the Constitutional Court in 2017. The party was admitted to the ALDE in November 2017. The party ran for election for the first time in the 2019 European Parliament election in Portugal, garnering 0.9% of the votes, and failing to win any seats in the European Parliament. In the 2019 legislative election, the party won a single seat in the Portuguese Parliament in the electoral district of Lisbon, earning 67,681 votes in total, equivalent to 1.29% of the votes cast. (Main article: Liberalism in Portugal).
- Romania: the National Liberal Party (Romanian: Partidul Național Liberal, ex-member of LI and ALDE and current member of EPP), is a centre-right liberal party, formerly part of the governing Social Liberal Union (USL) political alliance and coalition from 2011 to 2014 and currently of the National Coalition for Romania (CNR) since November 2021 onwards. (Main article: Liberalism and radicalism in Romania).
- Russia: Civic Platform (Russia) is a liberal party founded by Mikhail Prokhorov for Russia to have an "actual classic liberal free market party". Yabloko (Yabloko, Russian Democratic Party, Jabloko - Rossijskaja Demokratičeskaja Partija, member LI, ALDE) and the Right Cause (Pravoye Delo, member IDU) also contain ideas liberalism. While Yabloko is social liberal party, the Right Cause can be seen as a democratic conservative market party. The Liberal Democratic Party of Russia has been widely criticised for not being liberal, rather a nationalist, right-wing populist party. (Main article Liberalism in Russia).
- San Marino: the Popular Alliance (member EDP) is a centrist liberal party.
- Serbia: the Movement of Free Citizens is the largest liberal parliamentary party, as of the 2022 Serbian general election. Previously, Enough is Enough, Liberal Democratic Party, Civic Alliance of Serbia, G17 Plus, New Democracy/Liberals of Serbia, and New Party were known proponents of liberalism in Serbia. (Main article: Liberalism in Serbia).
- Slovakia: Progressive Slovakia (Progresívne Slovensko) is a social liberal political party and a member of the ALDE. Freedom and Solidarity (Sloboda a Solidarita) is a right of centre market liberal party. (Main article: Liberalism in Slovakia).
- Slovenia: the largest liberal party is the List of Marjan Šarec, member of the ALDE, a centrist liberal party. The second largest is the Party of Alenka Bratušek (member ALDE), a liberal spin-off from centre-left Positive Slovenia that went a more social democratic direction. The third largest is the classical-liberal Civic List (member ALDE). Two minor extra-parliamentary liberal parties in Slovenia are the Liberal Democracy of Slovenia (Slovene: Liberalna demokracija Slovenije, former member of both LI and ALDE), a centrist liberal party, and Zares, a social-liberal party, and also a former ALDE member. (Main article: Liberalism in Slovenia).
- Spain: there was a long tradition of liberalism during the Trienio Liberal. This ended with absolutist and carlist movements and Francoist Spain in the 20th century. At a national level there were attempts to establish half liberal parties, but they did not succeed until Union, Progress and Democracy (Unión, Progreso y Democracia), a progressive, social liberal and centralist party. It was replaced as major social liberal party in 2015 by Citizens (Spanish: Ciudadanos), which is autonomist and postnationalist. The Libertarian Party defends personal rights and economic freedom with a libertarian point of view. On a regional level, the Canarian Coalition (Spanish: Coalición Canaria) and the Democratic Convergence of Catalonia (Catalan: Convergència Democràtica de Catalunya, member ALDE) are nationalist, half-liberal parties (Main articles: Canovism, Liberalism and radicalism in Spain).
- Sweden: The Liberals (Swedish: Liberalerna, member LI, ALDE) is a centre-right liberal party. The Centre Party (Swedish: Centerpartiet, member LI, ALDE) is a historically agrarian party that has gradually developed into a centre-right liberal party, since 2013 referring to themselves as such. (Main article: Liberalism and centrism in Sweden).
- Switzerland: the main liberal party is FDP.The Liberals (member LI, ALDE), formed in 2007 by a merger of the Free Democratic Party of Switzerland and the Liberal Party of Switzerland. (Main article: Liberalism and radicalism in Switzerland).
- Ukraine: the position of liberalism is unclear. Voice (member ALDE) was founded in 2019. The Liberal Party (Liberalna Partia, observer LI) is a small liberal party. A clear liberal party was the Our Ukraine–People's Self-Defense Bloc (Naša Ukrajina), which was dissolved in 2012. (Main article: Liberalism in Ukraine).
- United Kingdom: liberalism is now represented mainly by the Liberal Democrats (member LI and ALDE), formed in 1988 from a merger of the Liberal Party formed in 1859 and the Social Democratic Party formed in 1981. The Liberal Democrats, which has over 3,000 councillors and 72 Members of Parliament, were the junior party in a governing coalition with the Conservative Party in 2010–2015. The Liberal Party was re-founded in 1989 and has several councillors in Britain, but no parliamentary representation.
  - Northern Ireland: the Alliance Party of Northern Ireland (member LI, ALDE) was formed in 1970 as a non-ideological cross-community party. (Main article Liberalism in the United Kingdom)

=== Oceania ===
Liberalism has a strong tradition in both Australia and New Zealand.

- Australia: the Liberal Party of Australia is considered to be centre-right, and largely the bastion of liberalism in Australia. Within the Liberal Party, there is a fusion of liberal and conservative views, a tradition which began by the party's predecessors in the early 20th century. The fusion has led to the party having a big tent membership, bound by an anti-Labor position. Many would argue that this party is a classical liberal party and that the perception of what liberalism is has changed, not the Liberal Party (which promotes the free market approach). Former Australian Prime Minister Malcolm Turnbull, a member of the Liberal Party, said that his party is "not a conservative party". The term small-l liberal generally refers to someone who champions civil liberties and progressive causes such as reconciliation with Indigenous Australians. These views are represented strongly within the broad Liberal Party, as well as in parties such as the Australian Democrats, which began its life as a group of social-liberals disaffected with the Liberal Party. The Libertarian Party is a classical liberal and libertarian party. (Main article: Liberalism in Australia).
- Cook Islands: the liberal Democratic Party is one of the two major parties opposing the nationalist Cook Islands Party.
- Fiji: the People's Alliance, FijiFirst and the Social Democratic Liberal Party (SODELPA) are all liberal parties. FijiFirst is centrist while the People's Alliance and SODELPA are centre-right.
- New Zealand: there is no longer a pure liberal party, as in the past the Liberal Party was the first organised political party, and the Liberal Government from 1891 to 1912 was responsible for many reforms. Similarly to Australia, this party merged with more conservative and free market forces to form the National Party of New Zealand, in order to oppose the advancement of the democratic socialist New Zealand Labour Party. Liberalism nowadays refers to a support for individual liberties and limited government. The term is generally used with a reference to a particular policy area, e.g. "market liberalism" or "social liberalism". Unqualified liberalism is less common; in its extreme form it is known by the American term libertarianism. The left of centre New Zealand Democratic Party took a more or less progressive liberal position in the spectrum, but lost popular support. ACT New Zealand is a classical liberal or libertarian party. (Main article: Liberalism in New Zealand).
- Solomon Islands: the Solomon Islands Liberal Party considered itself a liberal party.

== Non-parliamentary liberal parties ==
- Armenia: Armenian Liberal Democratic Party, Armenian Democratic Liberal Party, Liberal Democratic Union of Armenia
- Austria: The Democrats, The Social Liberals
- Benin: Liberal Democrats' Rally for National Reconstruction – Vivoten (Rassemblement des libéraux démocrates pour la reconstruction nationale – Vivoten)
- Canada: Libertarian Party of Canada
- Cyprus: Liberal Democratic Party member of the Interlibertarians International
- Ecuador: Movement Forwards Ecuador (Moviminiento Fuerza Ecuador, observer LI)
- France: Pole of freedoms, the French liberal movement, Liberal Alternative
- Georgia: Federalists, Free Democrats (affiliate ALDE)
- Germany: Party of Humanists
- Greece: The Liberals
- Guatemala: Reform Movement (observer LI), Liberal Party of Guatemala
- Guinea: Parti de l'Unité et du Libéralisme Social (member ALN)
- Haiti: Liberal Party
- Iran: Liberal Democratic Party of Iran
- Iraq: Liberal Amarji Party, National Liberal Independence Party
- Italy: Federation of Liberals (observer LI), Italian Liberal Party
- Kosovo: Liberal Party of Kosovo (observer LI, member ALDE)
- Laos: Lao Liberal Democratic Party
- Mongolia: Mongolian Liberal Democratic Party
- Moldova: National Liberal Party
- Netherlands: Liberal Democratic Party, Splinter
- Netherlands Antilles: Democratic Party
- Norway: Capitalist Party
- Peru: Liberty Movement, Liberal Party of Peru, Justice Party (member LI)
- Portugal: We, the Citizens!
- Spain: Liberal Coalition, Mallorcan Union (member LI)
- Sri Lanka: Liberal Party of Sri Lanka (member LI and CALD)
- Turkey: Liberal Democratic Party (former member LI)
- United Kingdom: Liberal Party
- United States: Libertarian Party, Personal Choice Party, Independence Party of Minnesota, Liberal Party, US Marijuana Party
- Uruguay: Liberal Party
- Venezuela: Organization for the Liberal Democracy in Venezuela, Civil Resistance, Democratic Liberal Movement, Rumbo Propio

== See also ==
- Lists of political parties
