= 1969 in Norway =

- Centuries: 18th; 19th; 20th; 21st
- Decades: 1940s; 1950s; 1960s; 1970s; 1980s
- See also: List of years in Norway

Events in the year 1969 in Norway.

== Incumbents ==
- Monarch – Olav V.
- Prime Minister – Per Borten (Centre Party)
- Coalition government - Conservative Party, Liberal Party, Christian People's Party, and Centre Party

== Events ==
- Citizens over 20 years old, with at least ten years of residency, are eligible to vote.
- 6 April – Railway accident occurs in Darbu, resulting in the deaths of 8 people.
- 7 September - The 1969 Parliamentary election begins.
- 8 September - The 1969 Parliamentary election ends.
- 8 September - The Labour Party remains the largest party in Norway, winning 74 of the 150 seats, and the coalition of right-of-centre parties win 76 seats and retain power.
- 24 December - Phillips Petroleum discovered the massive Ekofisk oil field, marking a significant milestone in Norway's petroleum industry.
- The Dissenter Act was abolished.

== Popular culture ==
=== Sports ===
- Rosenborg BK won the 1969 1. divisjon (the top-tier football league).
- Strømsgodset IF won the Norwegian Football Cup, claiming their first title after a replay.

=== Literature ===
- Olav Nordrå, writer, is awarded the Riksmål Society Literature Prize.

== Notable births ==
=== January to March ===
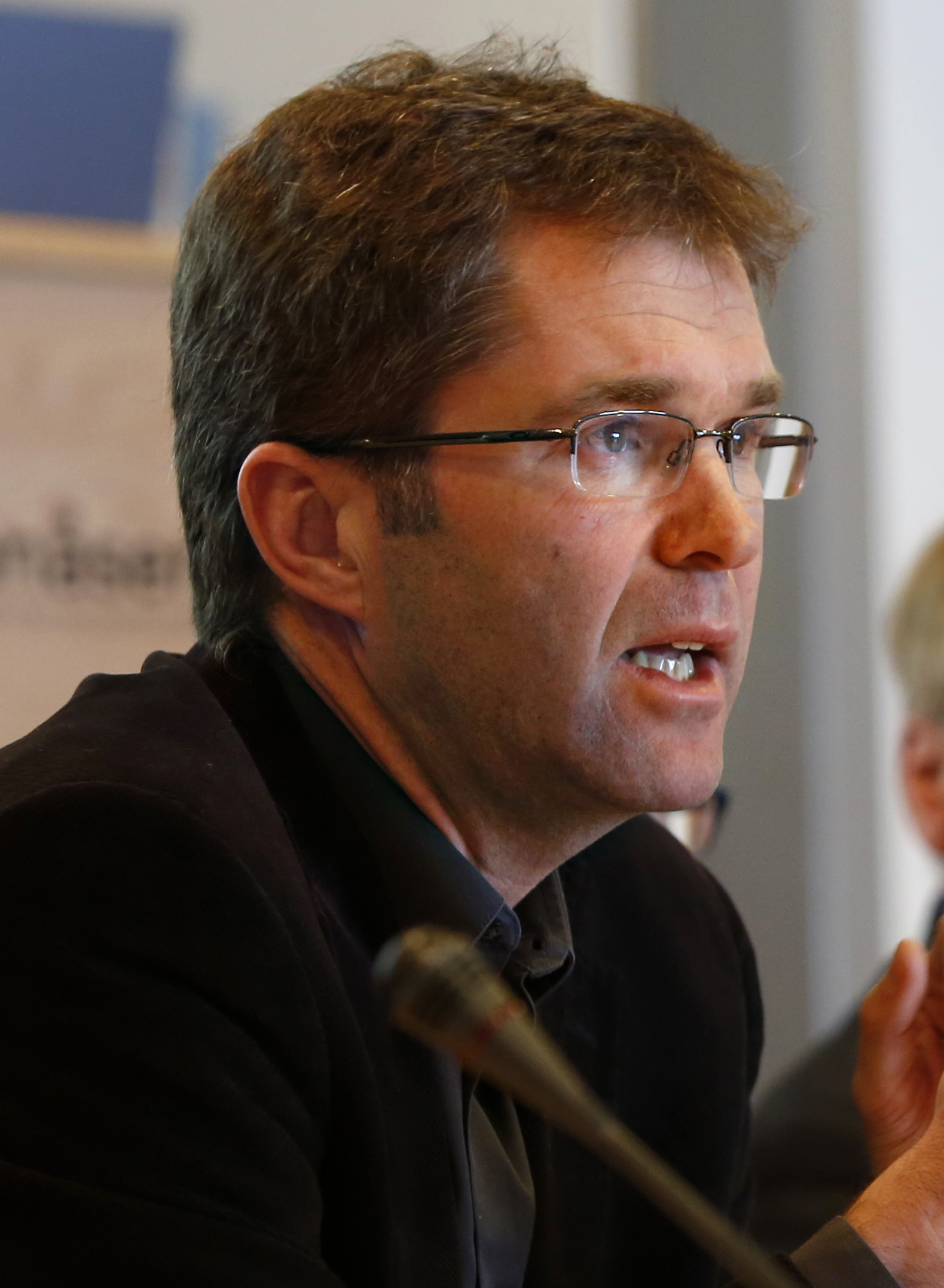
John-Arne Røttingen

*24 February – Merita Berntsen, beach volleyball player.

- 28 February – Terje Søviknes, politician.
- 1 March – Kamilla Gamme, diver.
- 1 March – Kjersti Løken Stavrum, media executive.
- 27 March – John-Arne Røttingen, medical scientist, research administrator and civil servant.

=== April to June ===
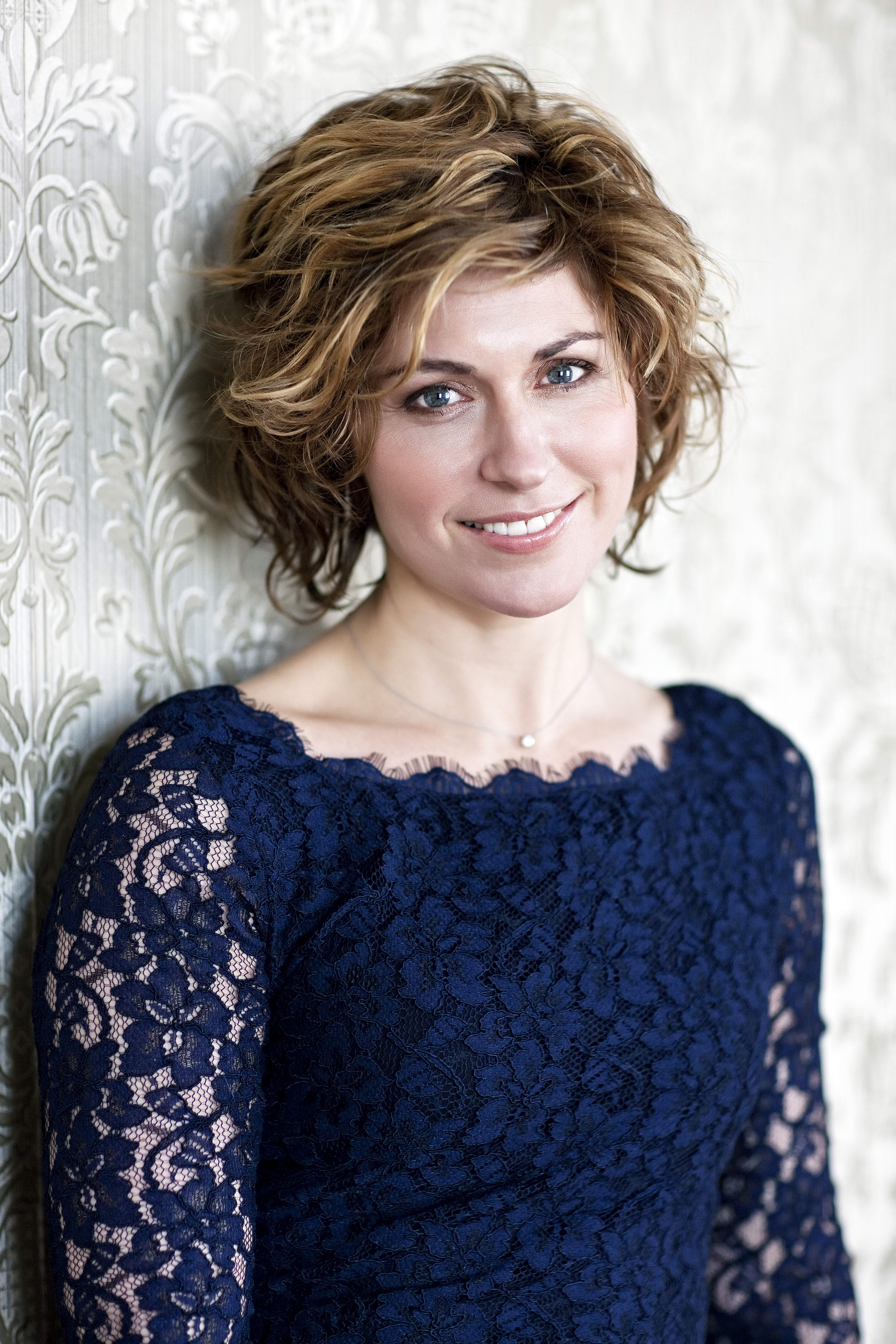
Sissel Kyrkjebø

- 1 May – Kjersti Ertresvaag Andersen, civil servant and diplomat.
- 4 May – Cathrine Grøndahl, poet.
- 15 May –
  - Kari Baadstrand Sandnes, politician
  - Carsten Thomassen, journalist killed in 2008 Kabul Serena Hotel attack (died 2008)
- 21 May – Håkon Haugli, politician and business executive.
- 24 May – Erlend Loe, writer.
- 25 May – Ragnhild Kostøl, cyclist.
- 1 June – Siv Jensen, politician.
- 15 June – Linda Cerup-Simonsen (born as Linda Andersen), sailor.
- 18 June – Anne Marit Bjørnflaten, politician
- 24 June – Sissel Kyrkjebø, Soprano

=== July to September ===
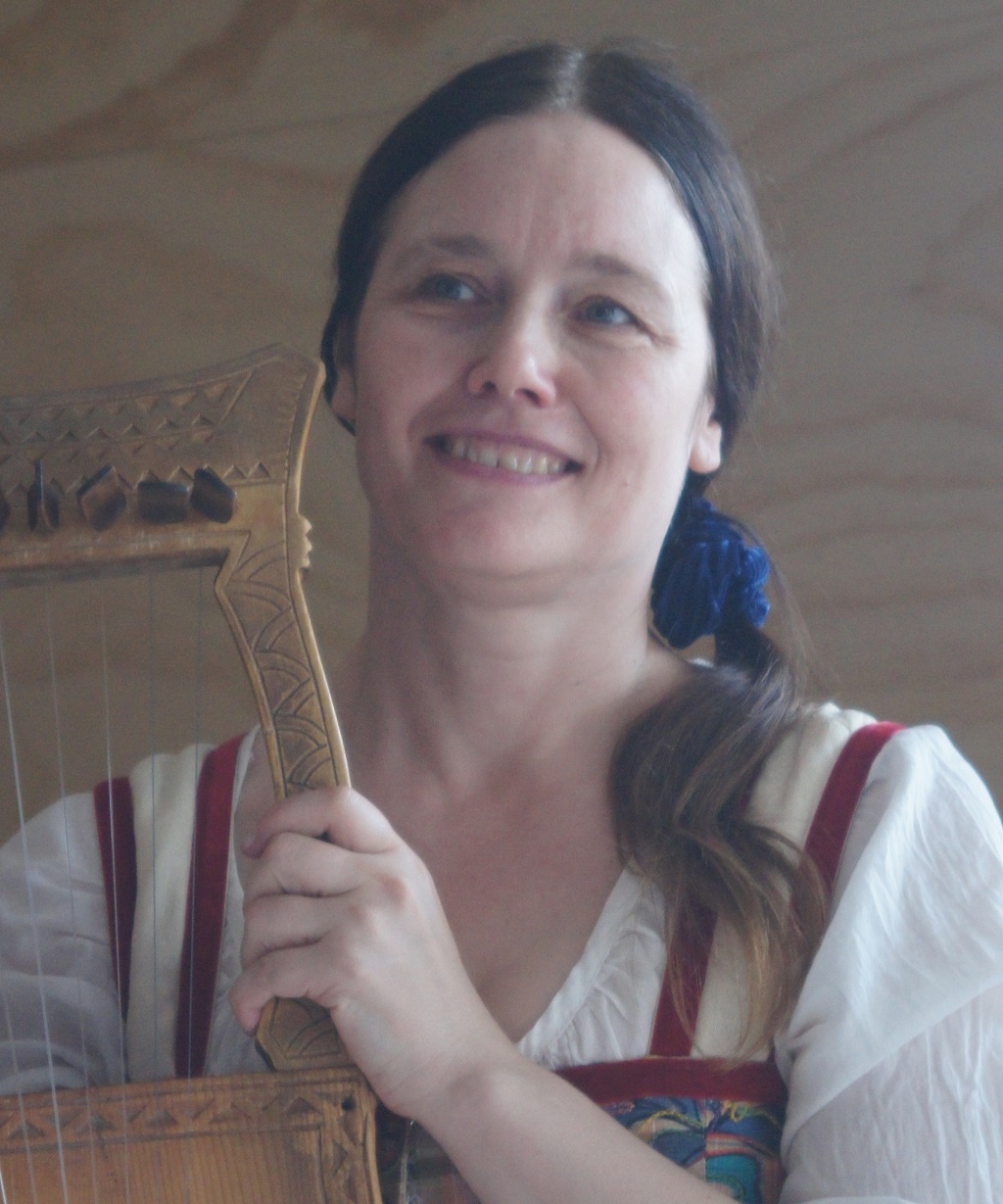
Øyonn Groven Myhren

- 14 July – Kristin Stoltenberg, newspaper editor and media executive.
- 8 August – Øyonn Groven Myhren, folk musician.
- 8 August – Roger Nilsen, footballer.
- 11 August – Atle Antonsen, comedian
- 31 August – Tore O. Sandvik, politician.
- 7 September – Jannicke Stålstrøm, windsurfer.
- 8 September – Lars Bohinen, footballer.

=== October to December ===
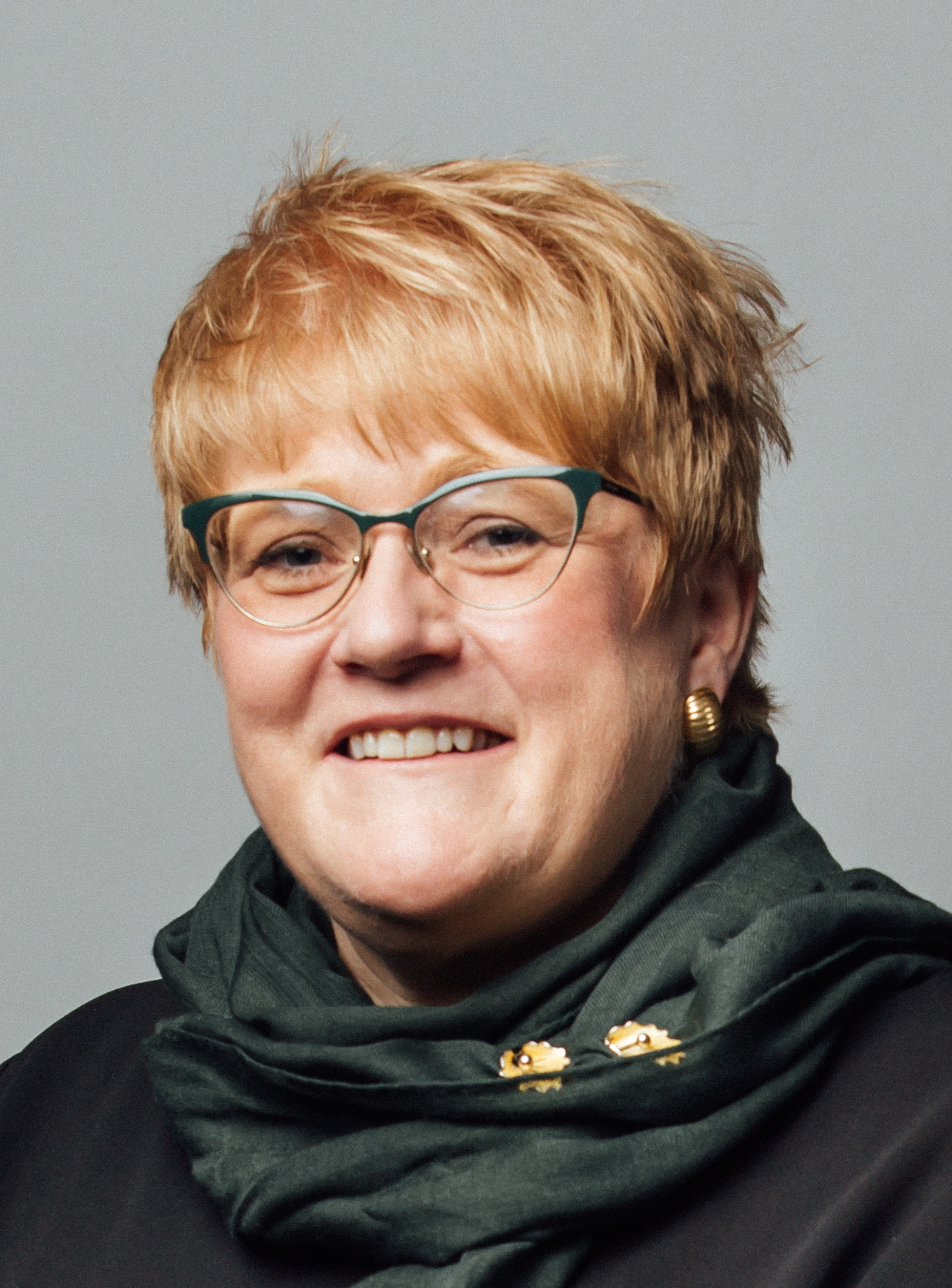
Trine Skei Grande

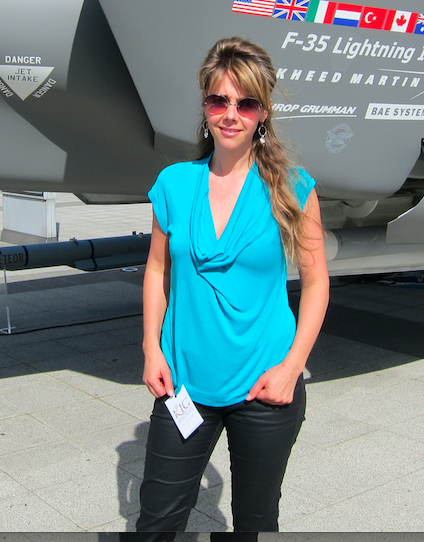
Sidsel Dalen

*2 October – Trine Skei Grande, politician

- 3 October – Ingeborg Hovland, footballer.
- 4 November – Ragnhild Jepsen, bishop.
- 4 November – Line Miriam Sandberg, politician.
- 6 November – Elin Floberghagen, journalist and organizational leader.
- 25 November – Kim Ofstad, drummer and composer
- 27 November – Sidsel Dalen, journalist and crime fiction writer.
- 28 November – Hanne Ørstavik, writer.
- 29 November – Anniken Huitfeldt, politician and Minister.
- 1 December – Ole Erik Almlid, newspaper editor and business executive.
- 3 December – Bjørn Kristoffer Bore, newspaper editor.
- 6 December – Trine Stenberg Tviberg, footballer.

=== Full date unknown ===
- Morten Øen, poet and author
- Gard Sveen, crime fiction writer.

== Notable deaths ==
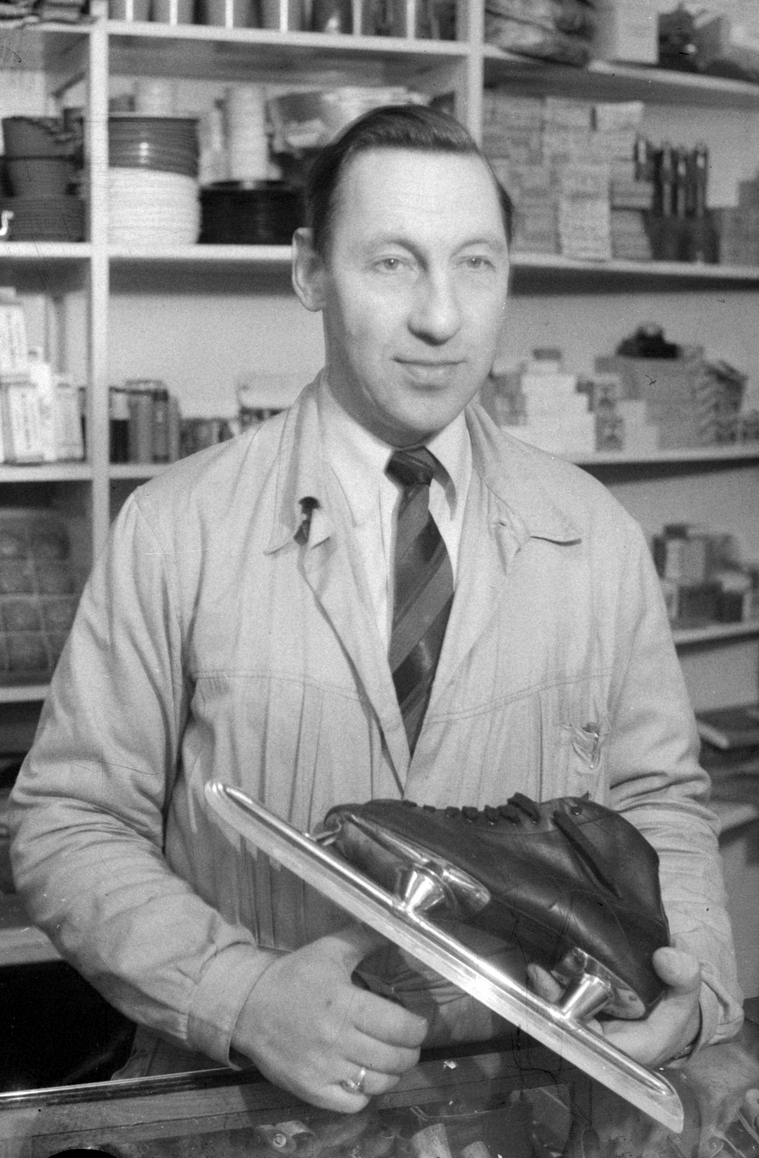
Ivar Ballangrud

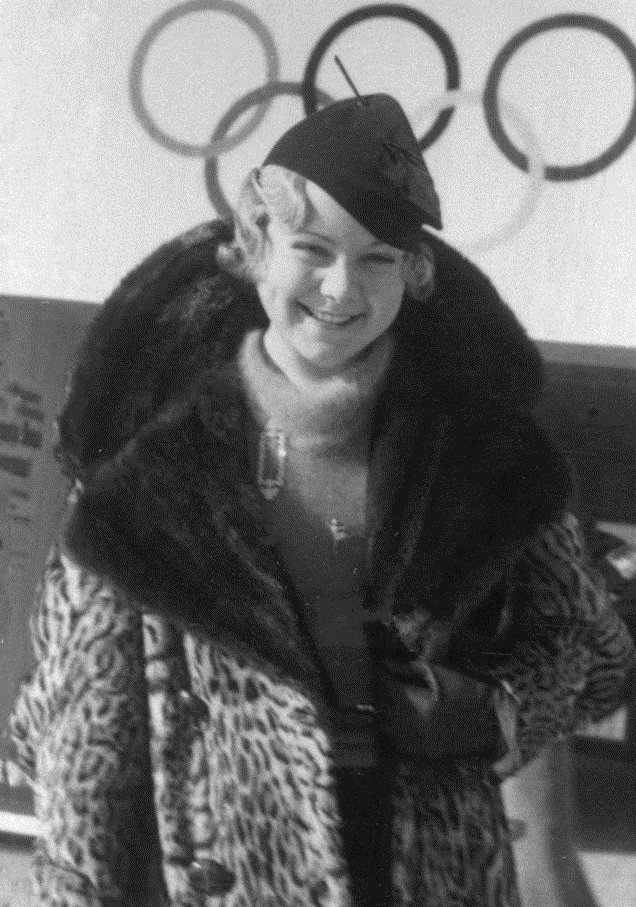
Sonja Henie

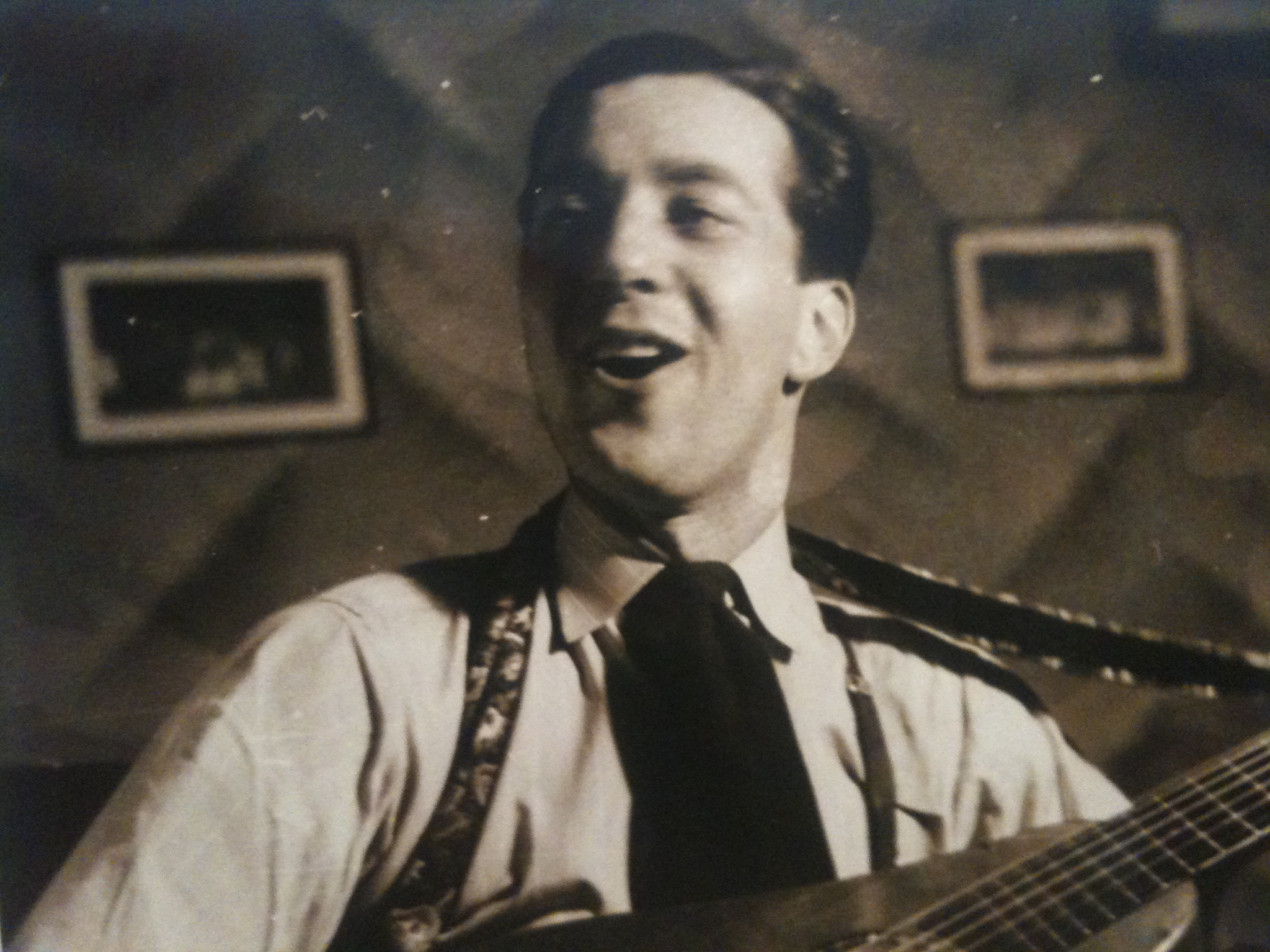
Jens Gunderssen

- 9 January – Erling Kristvik, educator (born 1882).
- 19 January – Lars Evensen, trade unionist and politician (born 1896)
- 22 January – Isak Larsson Flatabø, politician (born 1896)
- 12 February – Reid Sørlie, discus thrower (born 1909)
- 16 February – Eivind Stenersen Engelstad, archaeologist and art historian (born 1900)
- 24 February – Johan Bernhard Hjort, judge (born 1895)
- 22 March – Alf Lie, gymnast and Olympic gold medallist (born 1887)
- 11 April – Ludvig Irgens-Jensen, composer (born 1894)
- 8 May – Armand Carlsen, speed skater and world record holder (born 1905)
- 24 May – Fritz Skullerud, long-distance runner and station master (born 1885)
- 1 June – Ivar Ballangrud, speed skater and multiple Olympic gold medallist (born 1904)
- 2 June – Christen Christensen, pair skater (born 1904).
- 11 June – Knut Knutsson Steintjønndalen, Hardanger fiddle maker (born 1887)
- 21 June – Arne Rostad, politician (born 1894)
- 25 June – Olga Bjoner, organization leader and Nazi politician (born 1939).
- 15 July – Sverre Gjørwad, politician (born 1885)
- 17 July – Thoralf Glad, sailor and Olympic gold medallist (born 1878)
- 4 August – Marie Hamsun, actor and writer (born 1881)
- 18 August – Kristian Geelmuyden, politician (born 1875)
- 16 September – Tidemann Flaata Evensen, politician (born 1905)
- 26 September – Rikard Berge, folklorist (born 1881).
- 12 October – Sonja Henie, figure skater, three time Olympic gold medallist, World Champion and actress (born 1912)
- 18 October – Theodor Platou, brewer (born 1892).
- 12 November – Ragnhild Larsen, diver (born 1900)
- 25 November – Peder P. Næsheim, politician (born 1925)
- 8 December – Ole Singstad, civil engineer in America (born 1882)
- 11 December – Jens Gunderssen, singer, songwriter, actor, stage producer and theatre director (born 1912)
- 12 December – Sigurd Høgaas, politician (born 1892)
- 12 December – Bjarne Kjørberg, politician (born 1916)
- 15 December – Willy Røgeberg, rifle shooter and Olympic gold medallist (born 1905)

=== Full date unknown ===
- Friedrich Georg Nissen, civil servant (born 1887)
