= Liberal Union =

Liberal Union is a name used by several political parties in different countries including the following.

Existing parties:

- Albania - Liberal Union Party
- Cuba - Cuban Liberal Union

Historical parties:

- Australia - Liberal Union (South Australia) (1910–22)
- Australia - Australian Liberal Union (1911–15), organisational wing of the Liberal Party (Australia, 1909)
- Australia - Liberal Party (1922), also known as Liberal Union Party
- Finland - Liberal League (Finland) (1951–65)
- Germany - Liberal Union (Germany) (1880–84)
- Italy – Liberal Union (Italy) (1913–22)
- Lithuania - Liberal Union of Lithuania (1990–2003), Liberal and Centre Union (2003–14)
- Netherlands - Liberal Union (Netherlands) (1885–1921)
- Ottoman Empire - Liberal Union (Ottoman Empire) (1909)
- Spain - Liberal Union (Spain) (1858–74)
- Spain - Liberal Union (Spain, 1983) (1983–84)
- Uruguay - Liberal Union (Uruguay) (1855)

== See also ==
- Liberalism by country
