= Det Liberale Folkeparti =

Det Liberale Folkeparti or Liberal People's Party may refer to the following political parties in Norway:

- Liberal People's Party (Norway), 1992–2017
- Liberal People's Party (Norway, 1972), dissolved 1988
- Free-minded Liberal Party, under the name Frisinnede Folkeparti 1931–1936
