= Per Sandberg =

Norwegian politician (born 1960)

Per Sandberg MP
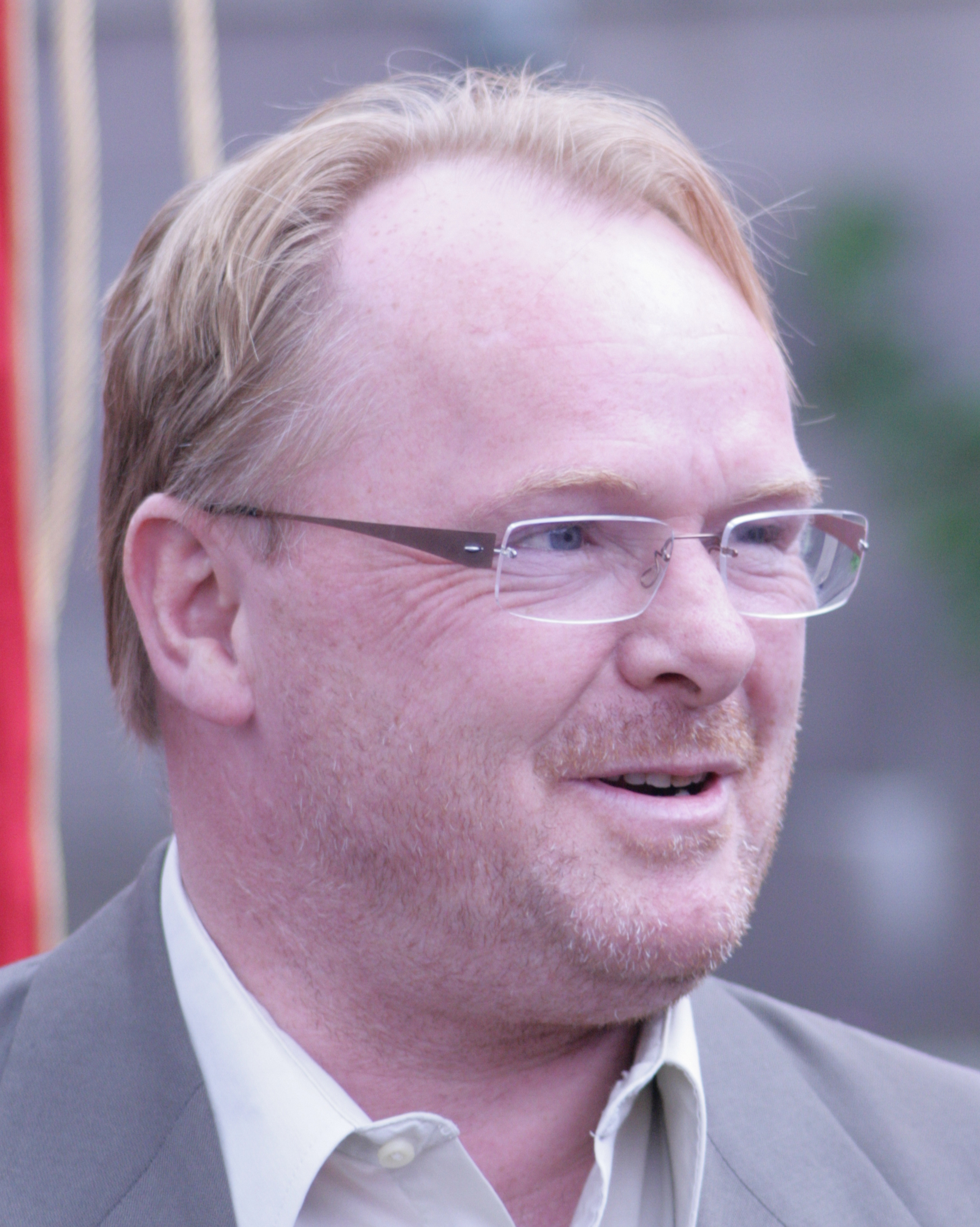
- Sandberg in 2009

Minister of Fisheries
- In office 16 December 2015 – 13 August 2018
- Prime Minister: Erna Solberg
- Preceded by: Elisabeth Aspaker
- Succeeded by: Harald T. Nesvik

Minister of Justice, Public Security and Immigration Acting
- In office 20 March 2018 – 4 April 2018
- Prime Minister: Erna Solberg
- Preceded by: Sylvi Listhaug
- Succeeded by: Tor Mikkel Wara

First Deputy Leader of the Progress Party
- In office 6 May 2006 – 13 August 2018
- Leader: Siv Jensen
- Preceded by: Siv Jensen
- Succeeded by: Sylvi Listhaug

Minister of Migration and Integration Acting
- In office 5 March 2017 – 2 July 2017
- Prime Minister: Erna Solberg
- Preceded by: Sylvi Listhaug
- Succeeded by: Sylvi Listhaug

Member of the Norwegian Parliament
- In office 1 October 2005 – 30 September 2017
- Constituency: Sør-Trøndelag
- In office 1 October 1997 – 30 September 2005
- Constituency: Nord-Trøndelag

Personal details
- Born: 6 February 1960 (age 66) Levanger, Nord-Trøndelag, Norway
- Party: Capitalist; Progress (formerly)
- Spouse: Line Miriam Haugan (Separated)
- Children: 3

Per Sandberg (born 6 February 1960) is a Norwegian politician for the Capitalist Party and formerly the Progress Party who served as the Norwegian Minister of Fisheries from 2015 to 2018. Sandberg was a member of the Norwegian parliament from 1997 to 2017 (2005–2017 from the Sør-Trøndelag constituency, and before that from Nord-Trøndelag), and served as chair of the parliamentary standing committees on Justice, and Transport and Communications. He has additionally held the position of first deputy leader of the Progress Party from 2006 to 2018. In 1997 he was convicted of assault and battery of an asylum seeker. His status as a convicted felon has made him controversial in Norwegian politics.

An outspoken politician with a blue-collar working background, Sandberg has stoked controversy on numerous occasions, and has been described, by former party chairman Carl I. Hagen as well as the media, as the "proto-typical Progress Party person" (Norwegian: Ur-FrP'eren).

== Early life and education ==
Sandberg was born in Levanger Municipality in Nord-Trøndelag county to self-employed businessman Rolf Sandberg (1926–2010) and part-time worker Rannveig Ertsås (1930–2006). He has three siblings, sister Mona, and brothers Harald and Stig (Stig committed suicide in 1997).

He has described his upbringing as "rough", partly due to his father, who he describes as being "incredibly strict and manipulative". According to Sandberg, his father would regularly lock him up in the outhouse or the cellar as punishment. He would also resort to corporal punishment on his siblings regularly. So great was the abuse, that Sandberg claims: "Had my father acted like that today, child welfare would have been there. And it would have been an immediate takeover by the child protection services".

After finishing Upper Secondary school, he held numerous different jobs including as a bartender and waiter at a Ski resort in Ustaoset, and later as a process operator at Norske Skog Skogn from 1982 to 1997, where he became the local trade union representative. In 1981 he settled in Levanger. Sandberg was in the service of UNIFIL in Southern Lebanon in 1986 during the Lebanese civil war, where he worked as a cook.

== Political career ==
=== Early political career ===
Sandberg modestly started his career in the Progress Party by lending his name to the party's local list in Levanger, as a favour to a friend, for the 1987 municipal election, but surprisingly ended up securing a seat in the municipal council in Levanger Municipality. He had originally joined the party after meeting resistance from public regulations when trying to build a house earlier in the 1980s. He was a member of the Nord-Trøndelag county council from 1995 to 1997, until the 1997 parliamentary election in which he secured the party nomination, beating his friend (and future minister) Robert Eriksson. During the election campaign, he attended BBQs and events through the whole constituency in a borrowed Volvo 240 with only party stickers as election material. He ended up, winning the seat, with 140 votes ahead of the Center Party favourite Marit Arnstad.

=== Member of Parliament ===
Serving as a member of the Storting since 1997, the first terms from Nord-Trøndelag, he has since 2005 been represented from the neighbouring county of Sør-Trøndelag. Sandberg chaired the parliamentary Standing Committee on Justice from 2009 to 2013, and from 2005 to 2009 chaired the Standing Committee on Transport and Communications. He became deputy leader of the Progress Party in 2006.

While being central in the negotiations leading to the Progress Party joining the Solberg Cabinet after the 2013 election, Sandberg claimed to have turned down offers for two different cabinet positions. On 28 October 2013, Sandberg announced that he was stepping down as deputy leader of the party in 2014, citing a "...lack of motivation to continue the work", but in early 2014 retracted his statement and said he would continue.

Shortly after making his later retracted announcement to step down as deputy leader, Sandberg published his political autobiography Mot min vilje - oppklaringen av et politisk liv ("Against my will - clarification of a political life"), in which he severely criticised several members of the Progress Party, as well as the political direction the party had taken following the 2011 Norway attacks.

=== Minister of Fisheries ===
On 16 December 2015 Sandberg was appointed Minister of Fisheries in Solberg's Cabinet.

=== Minister of Justice, Public Security and Immigration ===
On 20 March 2018 Sandberg was appointed as acting Minister of Justice, Public Security and Immigration in Solberg's Cabinet after Sylvi Listhaug resigned. He was later succeeded by Tor Mikkel Wara.

== Political positions ==
=== Law and order ===
Sandberg has been highly critical of newer prisons such as the Halden prison, which he claims to have "hotel-standard", this according to him being a mockery against most people. He has also been critical of the fact that the prison have better facilities than most public nursing homes and child protection institutions. In addition he has claimed that criminal foreigners and Eastern European gangs "laugh" at the Norwegian prison conditions.

=== Immigration ===
Sandberg proposed in 1999 that the government should be able to expel foreigners from Norway if their children committed serious crimes. In 2002 he proposed a complete stop of immigration from countries outside the Schengen Area.

In 2003, Sandberg stated that "different races, religions and cultures must not be mixed" if there are to be a "harmonious society in Norway", leading to strong reactions from other politicians. Sandberg in addition claimed to have backing for his statements from the chief of police, which caused the chief of police to strongly distance herself from Sandberg's claims. Sandberg also made the claim that ethnic Norwegians would soon become a minority in Norway.

The same year he also proposed to introduce electronic tags on asylum seekers to stop them from escaping while their asylum application is processed. Sandberg has also feared the growth of Muslims in Norway, and claimed that certain areas could eventually be subdued to Sharia law.

Sandberg has been accused of stirring up anti-Roma sentiment by stating, in 2013: "At the borders, police can [under existing laws] stop organized groups of Roma, Bulgarians or French because we know from experience that these people disrupt the peace and it has also been proven that many of them engage in criminal activities."

=== Other ===
In 2007 Sandberg claimed Al Gore of being "a big fraud", a "Christian-fundamentalist" and "super-capitalist who have earned over 600 million NOK on the climate cause".

Sandberg in 2014 claimed Norway's Crown Prince Haakon of being a "leftist", which he says has strengthened his position against the monarchy.

== Controversies ==
He made headlines when in January 1997 he headbutted and punched an asylum seeker from Yugoslavia in the face after the latter had called him "pale-white, fat and rich" and "racist". Sandberg was fined 3,000 NOK.

In mid-autumn 2006, Sandberg, who then was his party's spokesman for transport, was caught driving at a speed of 100 kilometres per hour (62 mph) in a 60 kilometres per hour (37 mph) zone i Målselv Municipality in Troms county, for which he got a suspended sentence of 21 days, lost his driver's license for eight months and was fined 9000 kr.

On 12 December 2006 Sandberg addressed the Norwegian parliament having consumed three shots of Akvavit and a beer. The president of the parliament, Thorbjørn Jagland, said that "to address parliament under the influence of alcohol is something one just does not do. It has got to do with respect for parliament and for one self". The incident caused a media sensation. As a result of this incident, subsequent intense pressure from the media, heavy workload and losing his mother around the same time, Sandberg later wrote that he slipped into a depression, and that he contemplated suicide, only to be saved at the last minute by a phone call from his fiancé. Sandberg would later claim that Thorbjørn Jagland himself had been consuming red wine along with the rest of the presidency at the time, before they voted in parliament.

In November 2011, in the middle of a public Labour-Progress feud and a heated session in parliament, Sandberg accused the Labour Party of exploiting the Utøya massacre for political gain. This caused Labour party member Helga Pedersen to storm out of the parliament, apparently weeping, while others left the session. Sandberg immediately apologized for the comments, which was accepted. Party leader Siv Jensen also publicly apologized on Sandbergs behalf the next day, before launching another attack at the Labour Party leadership.

During the Progress Party's annual congress in 2013, according to newspaper Verdens Gang, Sandberg had to be pulled off another senior party member after Sandberg reportedly had forced the other politician against a wall while shouting angrily at him. The dispute was thought to be part of a years-long internal dispute in the party's Troms chapter.

=== Vacation to Iran ===
In late July 2018 Sandberg went on an unannounced private vacation to Iran while still serving as Minister of Fisheries. Accompanying him on the trip was 28-year old Bahareh Letnes (née Nasserabad), an Iranian-born woman who had immigrated to Norway in her teens and subsequently was adopted by a Norwegian couple. Maritime business newspaper Fiskeribladet first reported on the case and wrote that Letnes was registered as the owner of a company involved in the exporting of seafood. Multiple politicians reacted to the news and questioned Sandberg's relation to Letnes, whether a conflict of interest existed, as well as whether the trip was approved by the prime ministers office. Sandberg explained that the trip as planned last-minute after his initial plan to vacation in Turkey was scrapped, this was due to an ongoing conflict with his estranged wife and that he informed the prime minister only after he had arrived in Iran.

Prime Minister Erna Solberg later informed the Storting that Sandberg had violated government regulations by not notifying his ministry about the vacation. Criticism towards Sandberg also increased after it was revealed that he had declined the security briefing that the Norwegian Police Security Service usually provide for Norwegian politicians who travel to countries where there is a high risk of espionage. Sandberg proceeded to break protocol by bringing his work phone along to Iran, and while he first claimed that he had hardly used it, he had in fact sent 153 text messages and made 22 phone calls. Many politicians, including party colleges Mazyar Keshvari and Christian Tybrig-Gjedde, also criticised Sandberg for seemingly "glorying" the Iranian regime when he appeared on a radio show where he spoke warmly of Iran as a travel destination. The criticism also increased when it was revealed that Sandberg, in February 2018, had accompanied Letnes to an event organized by the Iranian embassy in Norway that celebrated the Iranian revolution of 1979.

After weeks of mounting pressure from the media, opposition and fellow politicians Sandberg resigned as cabinet minister and First deputy leader of the Progress Party on 13 August.

== Threats and assaults ==
Sandberg has on several occasions been the victim of physical assaults. In January 2008, Sandberg was physically assaulted by being gripped by the throat and kicked by a man outside the Norwegian parliament. He managed to escape as Socialist Left politician Hallgeir Langeland happened to be nearby and came to his rescue. In July the same man, who had mental problems and had been given residence permit in Norway on humanitarian grounds, also punched down Labour Party politician Knut Storberget.

On another occasion, three men approached him, along with his political aide at a restaurant in Oslo, and according to Sandberg "was ready to attack", the situation was resolved when the men were evicted from the restaurant and Sandberg was promptly whisked out the back-door. On 27 March 2009, he was attacked by three youths while riding the tram in Oslo. The attack ceased when fellow passengers came to his rescue, the attackers fled before the police arrived.

== Personal life ==
While working at Ustaoset in 1976, he met Danish waitress Ulla Kjær Frandsen. They have two children together. He married his first wife, Line Miriam Sandberg (née Haugan) on 7 August 2010. Together they have a son. He used to divide his time three-ways between his parliamentary office in Oslo, his parliamentary constituency in Sør-Trøndelag, and his home in Lenvik Municipality in Troms county, on the island of Senja, where he used to live with his family. The commute from his home in Senja, which was a 3,160-kilometre (1,960 mi) long flight, was called "one of Norway's most extreme daily commutes" as he commuted the trip on a daily basis during the weeks of the 2013 government coalition negotiations. In May 2018 Sandberg separated from his wife and relocated from their home in Senja to a flat in Mandal.

In August 2018, Sandberg confirmed that he was in a relationship with businesswoman Bahareh Letnes and that they were in the process of moving in together. In April 2023, he confirmed that he and Letnes had separated.

== Bibliography ==
- Sandberg, Per; Bjørn Borge Lunde; Roger Pihl (2013). Mot min vilje - oppklaringen av et politisk liv (in Norwegian). Oslo: Juritzen forl. ISBN 9788282053525.

Political offices
Preceded by Elisabeth Aspaker	Minister of Fisheries; 2015–2018	Succeeded by Harald T. Nesvik
Preceded by Petter Løvik	Chair of the Standing Committee on Transport; 2005–2009	Succeeded by Knut Arild Hareide
