= Teodor Laço =

Albanian writer and diplomat

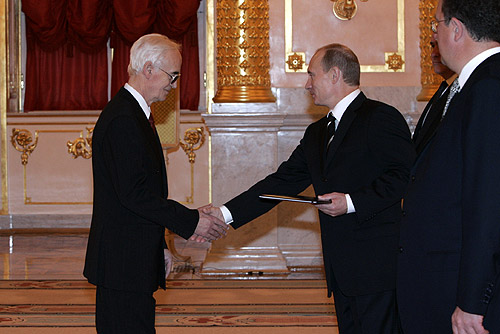
Laço (left) in 2006

Teodor Laço (6 September 1936, Dardhë – 15 October 2016, Tirana) was an Albanian writer and diplomat.

== Biography ==
He studied agronomy at the University of Tirana, and made his debut as a writer in 1965 with the novel Era e tokës, although he is best known for his 1971 novel Toka e Ashpër, describing the collectivization of a small village.

After 1976, he also wrote screenplays in collaboration with Kinostudio Shqipëria e Re. In 1977, he won an award at the Second Albanian Film Festival for his script for Përballimi (Confrontation, or The Face-Up). He later became the manager of the editorial board for the studio's feature films. In 1990, he became head of the Kinostudio, then renamed as "Albfilm".

In 1991, he was one of the founders and a leader of Social Democratic Party of Albania. The following year, he was elected to the Albanian Parliament and served for twelve years. From 1994 to 1997, he was the Minister of Culture. In 1998, he helped create the Liberal Union Party of Albania and was elected its leader in 2001. He also served as the Albanian ambassador to the Russian Federation from 2006 to 2010.

== Works ==
His works include:

- Era e tokës (The Wind of the Earth), 1965
- Shtëpia në rrugicë (The House on the Alley), 1968
- Një nuse për Stasin (A Story Bride), 1970
- Tokë e ashpër (Hard Ground), 1987
- Korbat mbi mermer (The Rooks on the Marble), 1981
- Një dimër tjetër (Another Winter), 1986
- Të gjithë lumenjtë rrjedhin (All Rivers flow), 1987
- Pushimet e kolonelit (The Colonel's Vacations), 1990
- Shi në plazh (Rain on the Beach)
- Vrasja e buzëqeshjes (The Murder of the Smile)
- Një dritare në Kremlin (A Window in the Kremlin)
- Mjegull (Fog), 2009
- Gropas 67, 2014
