= Liberal Union Party of Albania =

Albanian political party

The Liberal Union Party is a political party in Albania. It was established in 1998. As of 2001 it was led by Teodor Laco. It won five percent of the vote in the parliamentary elections in July 2005. As of 2007, this party is part of the majority coalition and the government, according to the European Commission.

== See also ==
- Liberalism in Albania
