= Organization for the Liberal Democracy in Venezuela =

Activist organization

The Organization for the Liberal Democracy in Venezuela (Organización por la Democracia Liberal en Venezuela, ODLV) is a classical liberal action tank from Caracas, Venezuela, created by a group of libertarian students. They are directive members of the Hispanic American Liberal Conference and as an intellectual group nowadays, they are willing to become a political party in the 2010.

ODLV uses the street alternative propaganda to promote classical liberalism, free-market ideas, individual rights and liberal capitalism. They have even filmed a controversial documentary: The Way Out, Liberal Capitalism (La Salida, el Capitalismo Liberal) with the support of the Movimiento Demócrata Liberal and Rumbo Propio para el Zulia.
