= Liberalism in Cyprus =

This article gives an overview of liberalism in Cyprus. It is limited to liberal parties with substantial support, mainly proved by having had a representation in parliament. The sign ⇒ denotes another party in that scheme. For inclusion in this scheme, it is not necessary so that parties labeled themselves as a liberal party.

== Background ==
The First Liberal Party to be formed in Cyprus was the Liberal Party by former Foreign Minister of Cyprus Nicos Rolandis who served in this position under two governments. Rolandis was also elected President of the Liberals International in 1993. The Liberal Party; however, merged with the centre-right Democratic Rally in 1998

== History ==
Nowadays there are two political parties in Cyprus representing the Liberal ideology, the Liberal Democratic Movement (Kinima Filelertheron Dimmokrato)( affiliated to the Interlibertarians ) who are a right of centre Liberal Party and claim to be a continuation of the first Liberal Party in Cyprus and the United Democrats (Enomeni Dimokrates, member ELDR) are a left of center liberal party.

== Liberal leaders ==
- George Vasiliou
- Nicos Rollandis,

== See also ==
- History of Cyprus
- Politics of Cyprus
- List of political parties in Cyprus
