= Håkon Haugli =

Norwegian politician and business executive

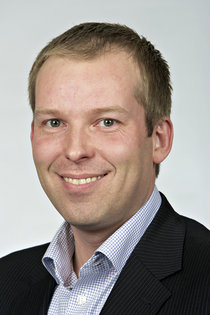
- Born: 21 May 1969 (age 57); Oslo, Norway
- Education: University of Oslo
- Occupations: Business executive and politician
- Employer: Innovation Norway
- Political party: Labour Party

Håkon Haugli (born 21 May 1969) is a Norwegian politician and business executive. Since 2019 he is the CEO of Innovation Norway.

== Personal life ==
Haugli was born in Oslo on 21 May 1969, a son of Håvard Haugli and Sigrun Anne Olsen.

== Career ==
A deputy member of the Storting from 2009 to 2013, Haugli represented the Labour Party and the Oslo District, and replaced prime minister Jens Stoltenberg as representative during this period. His prior work experience includes Gjensidige (insurance) and McKinsey & Co. He has held a number of board positions and holds a law degree from the University of Oslo. From 2014 to 2019, he was the Managing Director of Abelia, the business association for Norwegian knowledge and technology based enterprises. The association is part of the Confederation of Norwegian Enterprise (NHO).

In 2019, Haugli was appointed the CEO of Innovation Norway, a governmental instrument for innovation and development of Norwegian enterprises and industry.

== Other activities ==
- Trilateral Commission, Member of the European Group
