= Liberal Network for Latin America =

Liberal political international in Latin America

Liberal Network for Latin America Red Liberal de América Latina
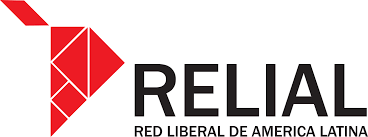
- Abbreviation: RELIAL
- President: Félix Maradiaga
- Secretary: Guillermo Peña
- Vice-President: Carlos Delgado
- Vocal: Victoria Jardim; Francisco Mendoza; José Guillermo Godoy
- Founded: 2004
- Headquarters: Cerrada Relox #32, Col. Chimalistac C.P. 01070, Álvaro Obregón, Mexico City
- Ideology: Liberalism
- Political position: Centre to centre-right
- International affiliation: Liberal International

Website
- relial.org

The Liberal Network for Latin America (Spanish: Red Liberal de América Latina), (Portuguese: Rede Liberal da América Latina), abbreviated to RELIAL, is a network of 46 liberal institutions from 16 Latin American countries. Members of RELIAL include political parties as well as think tanks, foundations and research institutes. RELIAL is the regional organization of the Liberal International.

It was founded in 2003 with the official launch taking place in Costa Rica November, 2004.

== Members ==
=== Full Members ===
Name	Country	Organisation type
Fundación Libertad y Progreso	Argentina	
Liberty Foundation (Fundación Libertad)	Argentina	
Fundación Cívico Republicana	Argentina	
Fundación Federalismo y Libertad	Argentina	
Fundación Bases	Argentina	
New Democracy Foundation (Fundación Nueva Democracia)	Bolivia	
Instituto de Estudios Empresariais	Brazil	
Fundación Libertad y Desarrollo	Chile	Think tank
Fundación para el Progreso	Chile	Think tank
Evópoli	Chile	Political party
Asociación Nacional de Fomento Económico (ANFE)	Costa Rica	
Instituto de Desarollo Empressarial y Acción Social	Costa Rica	
Instituto Desarrollo Ambiente y Libertad (IDEAL Latinoamérica)	Costa Rica	
Centre for Public Policy Analysis (Centro de Análisis para Políticas Públicas)	Dominican Republic	
Centro Regional de Estrategias Económicas Sostenibles (CREES)	Dominican Republic	
Ecuadorian Institute of Political Economy (Instituto Ecuatoriano de Economía Política)	Ecuador	
Libre Razón	Ecuador	
Fundación Ciudadanía y Desarrollo	Ecuador	
Centro de Investigaciones Económicas Nacionales (CIEN)	Guatemala	Think tank
Liberal Party of Honduras	Honduras	Political party
Fundación Eléutera	Honduras	
Caminos de la Libertad	Mexico	
Freedom Foundation (Fundación Libertad)	Nicaragua	Think and Do Tank
Citizens for Liberty	Nicaragua	Political party
Freedom Foundation Panama (Fundación Libertad Panamá)	Panama	
Institute for Freedom (Instituto Pro Libertad)	Peru	
Instituto Manuel Oribe	Uruguay	
Center for Education on Economic Knowledge (Centro de Divulgación del Conocimiento Económico)	Venezuela	
Come Venezuela	Venezuela	Political party
Ref:

=== Associate Members ===
Name	Country	Organisation type
United Republicans	Argentina	Political party
Students for Liberty	Brazil	Student political organization
Fundación Ciudadano Austral	Chile	Think tank
Libertank	Colombia	Think tank
Fundación Ecuador Libre	Ecuador	
Ref:
