= Liberal People's Party (Norway) =

Liberal People's Party Det Liberale Folkepartiet
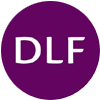
- Leader: Vegard Martinsen
- Founded: 1992
- Dissolved: 2017
- Split from: DLF, FrP
- Succeeded by: Capitalist Party
- Headquarters: Oslo
- Youth wing: Liberalistisk Ungdom
- Ideology: Liberalism (Norwegian); Classical liberalism Laissez-faire; Objectivism
- Colours: Purple

Website
- www.stemdlf.no

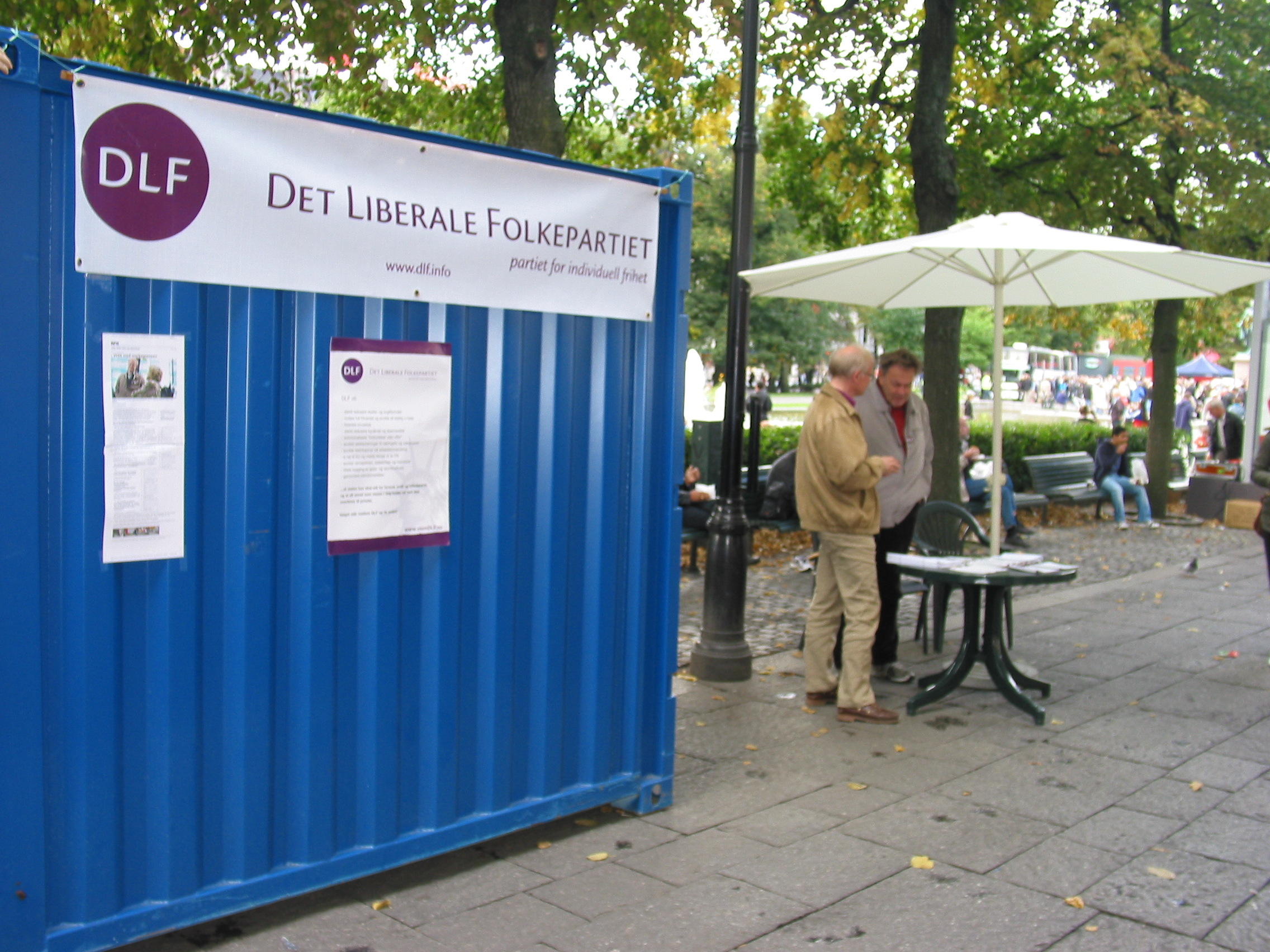
Campaign booth ahead of the 2009 election.

The Liberal People's Party (Norwegian: Det Liberale Folkepartiet, DLF) was a classical liberal Norwegian political party created in 1992 by some of the members of the old Liberal People's Party.

In 2017, during the last national convention the party decided to close down. And encouraged its members to join the Foreningen for Studium av Objektivismen and the Liberalistene.

== History ==
During the 1990s, some of the Progress Party's members considered the party to have become less liberal than it had been in its earlier days. These members of the Progress Party then decided to join the DLF. The DLF then took increasingly more classically liberal viewpoints on most issues, emerging as a promoter of economic liberalism and laissez-faire capitalism. The party's politics states that the state should only protect individuals' rights through police, courts of law and a military service.

The party's parliament election results are as follows:

In 1993, the party won 725 votes 0.03%

In 1997, the party won 258 votes 0.01%

In 2001, the party won 166 votes 0.01%

In 2005, the party won 213 votes 0.01%

In 2009, the party won 350 votes 0.01%

In 2013, the party won 909 votes 0.03% the best results in the party’s history

In 2017, the party did not run. This was because the party dissolved at the end of 2017.

The party's local election results are as follows:

In 1995, the party did not run

In 1999, the party did not run

In 2003, the party got 113 votes 0.01%

In 2007, the party got 127 votes 0.01%

In 2011, the party got 247 votes 0.01% all in Oslo

In 2015, the party did not run

In 2014, the youth wing Liberalistisk Ungdom (Liberal Youth) seceded from the DLF and joined the Capitalist Party as their youth wing.

In 2017, the party congress decided to shut down the party by the end of the year. Followers were recommended to join the Union for the Study of Objectivism and the Capitalist Party.

== Objectives ==
DLF wanted to:

- Replace the parliamentary system and the monarchy with a constitutional republic.
- Abolish coercive taxes.
- Abolish all current restrictions regarding trade between Norway and other nations. Viewing the EU as a social democratic, redistributive and protectionist organization, they opposed Norwegian membership.
- Simplify laws, end bureaucracy, decriminalize victimless crimes, and so forth.
- Privatize roads, highways, railroads and other infrastructure, leaving their construction and upkeep to the free market.
- Abolish state financing of: special interest groups, business and industry, the agricultural and fishing sectors, the unemployed, and so forth.
- Abolish restrictions on immigration, provided that the above is accomplished beforehand.
- Abolish mandatory military service, instead relying on a fully professional defence force.
- Complete the separation of church and state.

== Party leaders ==
- 1992–1995 Tor Ingar Østerud
- 1995–1997 Runar Henriksen
- 1997–2001 Trond Johansen
- 2001–2003 Arne Lidwin
- 2003–2017 Vegard Martinsen
