= Liberalism in Norway =

This article gives an overview of liberalism in Norway. It is limited to liberal parties with substantial support, mainly proved by having been represented in the Norwegian Parliament, Stortinget.

== Background ==
The Liberal Party (Venstre, literally "Left") was the first organized political force in Norway, and was for long times the dominant political party (from the 1880s to the 1920s). Since the Second World War, it has been one of the minor parties, but still represented in parliament. Today, Venstre is a centrist liberal party. Venstre is also one of the founding members of the Liberal International. Venstre calls itself 'the only liberal party in Norway', though this is disputed by other parties who also refer to themselves as liberal.

The Conservative Party (Høyre, literally "Right",) was the second organized political party in Norway. After the Second World War, it has at points been the second largest party in elections. In its policies, Høyre supports moderate free market liberalism, while being moderately conservative in social issues. There are, however, more liberally oriented factions within the party.

The Progress Party (Norwegian: Fremskrittspartiet) formed in 1973. Over the years, the party has supported a variety of liberal positions, especially in regards to a market economy, but also on some social issues. During the 1980s, the party was influenced by libertarianism, but this influence has decreased from the early 1990s and onwards. Since 2006, the party has become more socially conservative in orientation. This might have changed again to a certain degree recently however, as the party chose to vote in favor of same-sex marriage in the 2013 national convention, as well as party leader Siv Jensen's focus on liberalism in recent news articles. The Progress Party is also skeptical of non-Western immigration, which could be seen as conflicting with traditional liberal values. The party has in several elections been the second largest party in Norway, but had never participated in government until the election of 2013, when they formed a coalition government with the Conservative Party.

The Capitalist Party (Norwegian: Liberalistene) is a newer party grounded in classical liberalism and Laissez-faire capitalism. It advocates personal freedom and autonomy. This party has not yet been represented in parliament.

The Liberal People's Party (Norwegian: Det Liberale Folkepartiet) was a minor, classical liberal party, with a focus on Objectivism. It has never been represented in parliament.

== History ==
The following are events of Norway's liberalism, beginning with the 19th century.

- 1800s: The Haugean movement was a Christian and classical liberal movement that advocated for religious freedom and economic liberalism.
- 1814: Norway got one of the most democratic and liberal constitutions in Europe.
- 1842: The Conventicle Act was repealed.
- 1852: The Jewish Clause of the Norwegian Constitution of 1814 was repealed, allowing Jews to live in Norway.
- 1865: Bondevennene, founded by Søren Jaabæk, was a classical liberal organization that advocated for republicanism and greater economic liberalism.
- 1869: Reformforeningen was founded in parlament.
- 1884: The liberal and radical groups in Stortinget (up until that time collectively referred to as "venstre", without capitalisation) organised a political party, Venstre. Venstre deposes the incumbent conservative government in an impeachment trial in the same year, and the leader of Venstre, Johan Sverdrup, becomes the first Prime Minister of Norway taken from the ranks of Stortinget.
- 1888: A group of Christian conservatives leaves Venstre to form Moderate Venstre (The Moderate Left). The party is later reunited with Venstre, but the present-day Christian People's Party also claims Moderate Venstre as its forerunner.
- 1891: The Austrian Farmand magazin was founded.
- 1909: The right wing of Venstre leaves the party and forms Frisinnede Venstre (Free-minded Liberal Party).
- 1911: A radical faction leaves Venstre to form Arbeiderdemokraterne (Labour Democrats). This party is later renamed Radikale Folkeparti (Radical People's Party).
- 1936: Radikale Folkeparti is reabsorbed into Venstre. Frisinnede Venstre is merged with the main conservative party, Høyre (literally Right)
- 1972: Venstre is split over the issue of Norway's accession to the European Economic Community. The Pro-EEC faction forms Nye Venstre (New Left), later renamed Det Liberale Folkeparti (Liberal People's Party).
- 1988: Venstre and Det Liberale Folkeparti are reunited.
- 1992: Former members of the Det Liberale Folkeparti founded the a new Liberal People's Party.
- 1994: A libertarian wing of the populist Progress Party, counting among them four members of Stortinget, forms its own party, Fridemokratene (Free Democrats) or joined the Det Liberale Folkepartiet. The party is reduced to insignificance after the general elections of 1997.
- 2003: Civita, Norway's first liberal and conservative think tank, is founded.
- 2005: Venstre gains ten seats in Parliament at the general elections, forming the largest socialLiberal group in Stortinget since 1972.
- 2014: Liberalistene (Classical Liberals) was founded.
- 2017: Det Liberale Folkeparti merged with Liberalistene.

== See also ==
- History of Norway
- Politics of Norway
- List of political parties in Norway
