= Kjersti Ertresvaag Andersen =

Norwegian diplomat and civil servant

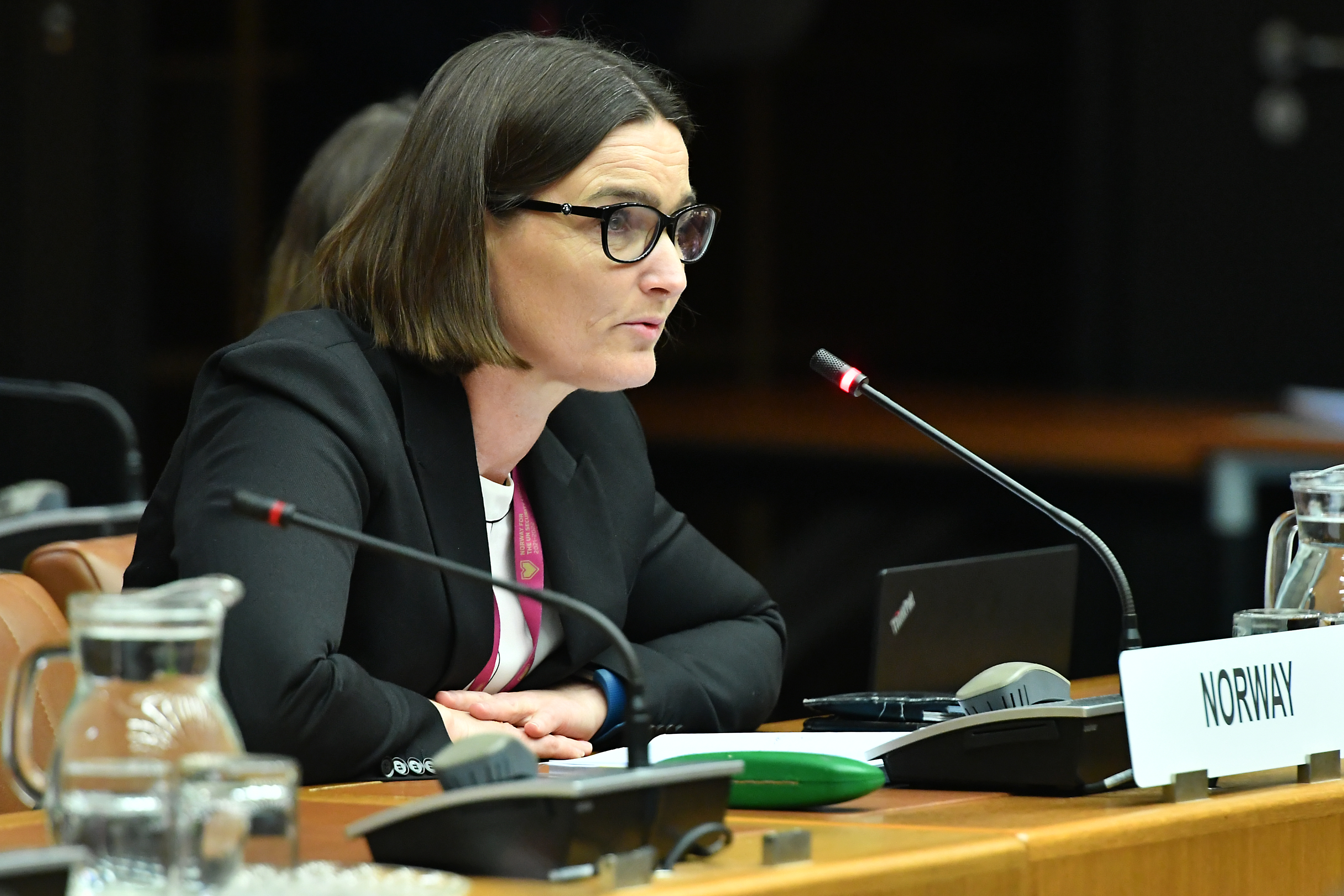
- Born: 1 May 1969 (age 56)
- Occupations: Civil servant Diplomat

Kjersti Ertresvaag Andersen (born 1 May 1969) is a Norwegian civil servant and diplomat. Since 2023 she serves as director general at the Office of the Prime Minister.

== Career ==
Born on 1 May 1969, Andersen is educated cand.polit. and has been assigned to the Norwegian foreign services since 1998. From 2010 to 2014 she served as chief of staff to the Foreign Minister, for the ministers Støre, Eide and Brende, respectively. She assumed the position of director general (ekspedisjonssjef) of the Department of UN and Humanitarian Affairs at the Ministry of Foreign Affairs from 2014 to 2018. From 2018 to 2022 she was ambassador of Norway to Austria in Vienna.

She was appointed director general (ekspedisjonssjef) at the Office of the Prime Minister in 2023.
