= Liberalism in Senegal =

This article gives an overview of liberalism in Senegal. It is limited to liberal parties with substantial support, mainly proved by having had a representation in parliament. The sign ⇒ means a reference to another party in that scheme. For inclusion in this scheme it isn't necessary so that parties labeled themselves as a liberal party.

== Introduction ==
The Senegalese Democratic Party (Parti Démocratique Sénégalais, member LI) is a liberal party with a strong personalist character.

== Liberal leaders ==
- Abdoulaye Wade

== See also ==
- History of Senegal
- Politics of Senegal
- List of political parties in Senegal
