= Line Miriam Sandberg =

Norwegian politician (born 1969)

- Born: Line Miriam Haugan; 4 November 1969 (age 56)
- Occupation: Politician
- Spouse(s): Per Sandberg (2010–2018)

Line Miriam Sandberg (née Haugan; born 4 November 1969) is a Norwegian politician for the Progress Party.

She was elected deputy representative to the Storting from the constituency of Troms for the periods 2005–2009 and 2009–2013. She was appointed State Secretary in the Ministry of Health and Care Services from November 2017.

In 2010 in Finnsnes, she married Per Sandberg. They resided on the island of Senja with one child, until the couple was separated in 2018.
