= Liberalistene =

Political party in Norway

Capitalist Party Liberalistene
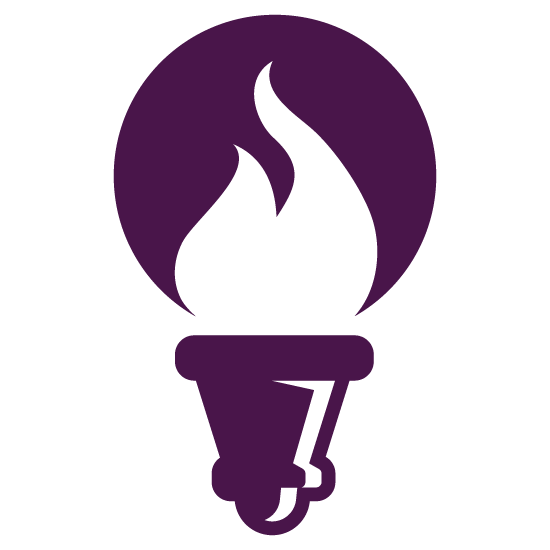
- Abbreviation: Lib
- Leader: Arnt Rune Flekstad
- Secretary: Oddbjørn Sjursen
- Founded: 7 April 2014
- Registered: 2016
- Preceded by: Liberal People's Party
- Headquarters: Oslo
- Youth wing: Capitalist Youth (Liberalistisk Ungdom)
- Ideology: Liberalism (Norwegian); Classical liberalism; Laissez-faire; Minarchism; Euroscepticism
- Political position: Right-wing
- International affiliation: International Alliance of Libertarian Parties; Interlibertarians
- Colours: Purple
- Slogan: Your life, your choice! (Ditt liv, ditt valg!)
- Parliament: 0 / 169
- Regional councils: 0 / 728
- Local councils: 0 / 10,781
- Sámi Parliament: 0 / 39

Website
- www.liberalistene.org

The Capitalist Party (Norwegian Bokmål: Liberalistene; Nynorsk: Liberalistane; lit. "The Liberals") is a political party in Norway. Founded in 2014 and officially registered in 2016, the party has established chapters in all counties and several municipalities throughout Norway.

Their ideological platform advocates for a minimal state, with governing principles based on Western constitutionalism and free market economic doctrine. The party is led by its central board (Sentralstyre), which has been chaired by Arnt Rune Flekstad since 2022. The party's youth wing is the Capitalist Youth (Liberalistisk Ungdom), currently led by Carl Fredrik G. Løken. In 2017, the party took part in its first parliamentary election, where it participated through every electoral district in Norway. Two years later, it took part in its second municipal election in all counties, 42 municipalities, and 7 out of 15 city districts in Oslo.

== Platform ==
Based on classical liberalism and Age of Enlightenment philosophies, the party advocates for a minimal state, where the responsibility of government is limited to administering the police, military, and justice system. The Capitalist Party believes that the state should be prohibited from compelling its electorate, and exists only to protect individuals from aggression, theft, and fraud. The essence of the Capitalist Party's policies relies on voluntary solutions, opposed to government mandated solutions. It firmly believes that voluntary solutions provide a better, cheaper and more effective alternative when providers of goods and services must compete in a market free of coercion.

In accordance with the party's motto, the foundation of this platform holds that an individual owns his or her own life, is responsible for his or her decisions and prosperity, and that each has the inherent right to autonomously pursue his or her private interests to the extent that those pursuits do not violate the rights of another.

With convictions firmly rooted in the values of Western constitutionalism, the Capitalist Party believes in the separation of powers between the three branches of government: executive, legislative, and judicial. This system of checks and balances will, according to the party, ensure that personal freedoms are secure and will prevent the rise of statism.

Economically, the party is dedicated to laissez-faire, which advocates for a free market, devoid of invasive regulations and taxation. The party views individual sovereignty as an inalienable natural condition, and holds that regulatory practices impede upon self-determination and self-ownership, thereby inhibiting individual freedom and innovative productivity. To that end, people should collaborate freely, under peaceful and voluntary conditions, without the coercion of state intervention.

== Organisation and structure ==
The Capitalist Party was established in 2014. Headquartered in Oslo, the party is organized in every Norwegian county.

National leadership serves on the Central Executive Committee (sentralstyre), which currently includes leader Arnt Rune Flekstad, political deputy Jan-Øyvind Lorgen, and party secretary Oddbjørn Sjursen. Members constitute the party's legislative body, selecting leadership and protocols at the annual regional (årsmøte) and national (landsmøte) conventions.

The party's youth wing is The Capitalist Youth (Liberalistisk Ungdom). Established in 2004, The Capitalist Youth was originally affiliated with the Liberal People's Party until transitioning to the Capitalist Party in 2014.

=== National leadership ===
Term	Leader	Political Deputy	Deputy leader	Secretary	Youth Leader
2014–2015	Espen Hagen Hammer		Agnethe Johnsen	Eigil Knudsen	Petter Hagelien
2015–2016	Arnt Rune Flekstad		Roald Ribe	Eigil Knudsen	Petter Hagelien
2016–2017	Arnt Rune Flekstad		Roald Ribe	Eigil Knudsen	Fredrik Laving
2017–2018	Arnt Rune Flekstad		Roald Ribe	Geir Hoksnes	Fredrik Laving
2018–2019	Arnt Rune Flekstad		Fredrik Laving	Amund Farberg	Benjamin Bringsås
2019–2020	Arnt Rune Flekstad	Kjell Bakke	Kenneth Tolås	Jan-Øyvind Lorgen	Benjamin Bringsås
2020–2021	Ronny Skjæveland	Roald Ribe	Aleksander Aas	Jan-Øyvind Lorgen	Benjamin Bringsås
2022–	Arnt Rune Flekstad	Jan-Øyvind Lorgen	Nicolay Normann Grundt	Oddbjørn Sjursen	Carl Fredrik G. Løken

Landsmøte (National Congress) 2016 with party leadership

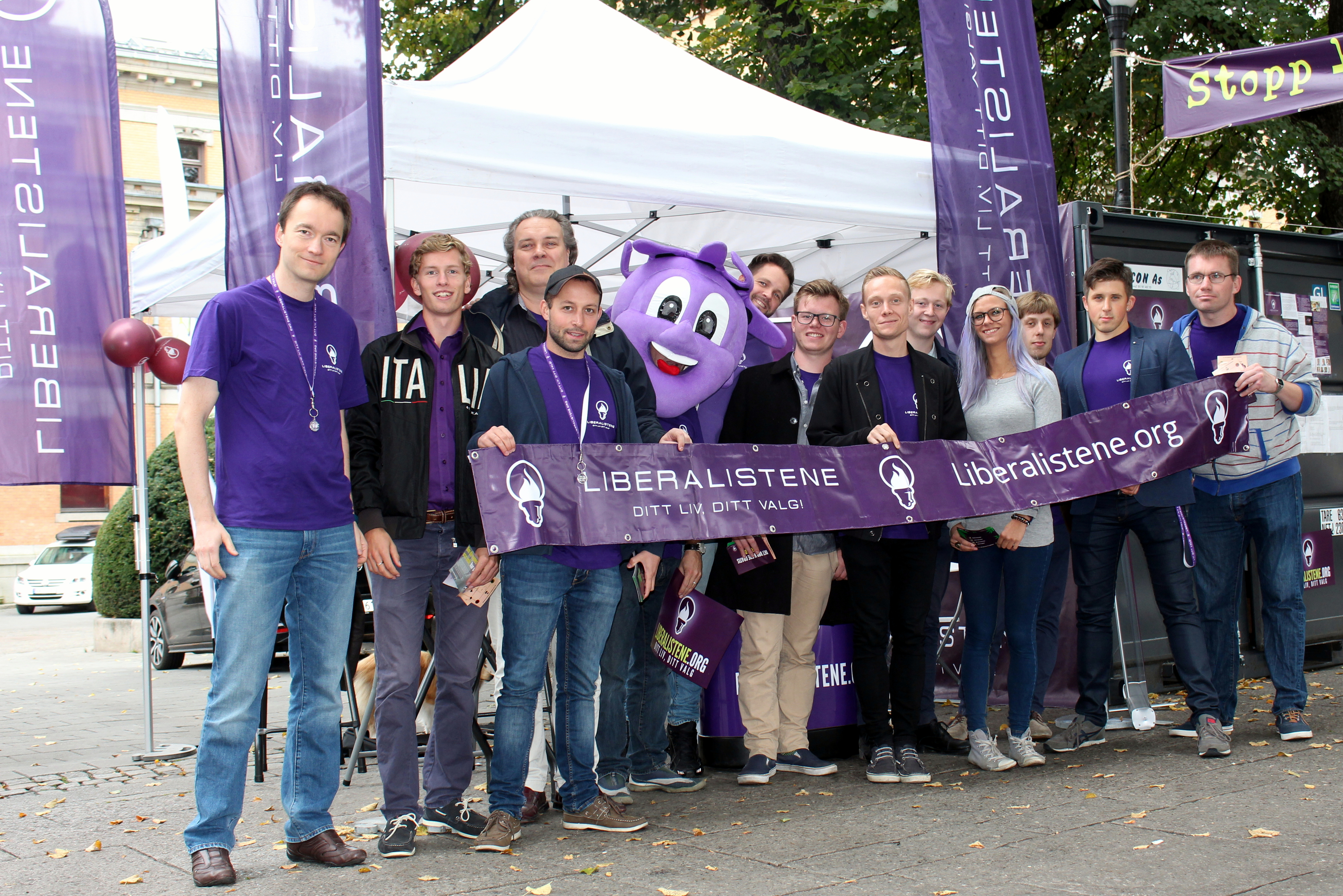
Party members during first municipal campaign in Oslo

== Recent history ==
During its first national convention, the Capitalist Party declared support for the creation of Liberland, a micronation founded by Czech libertarian Vít Jedlička from the Party of Free Citizens.

In March 2015, the Capitalist Party gathered the amount of constituent signatures required by the state to participate in Oslo's 2015 municipal elections, where it received 458 votes. They held their second national congress in Oslo, April 2016. The third national congress was held a year later, also in Oslo, April 2017. The same year the party participated in its first national election for seats in parliament, with full coverage of all possible election districts in the country. It received 5,599 votes, equal to 0.2% of the total votes.

During late 2017 and 2018, the Capitalist Party developed national guides for political programs with local county and district scopes, to be used as a foundation by the local chapters as a baseline, for their local political programs. They were ratified by the fourth national congress. In 2019 the Capitalist Party participated in its second municipal elections, with full coverage of all possible counties (fylke) and 42 municipalities (kommune) in the country. The Oslo Chapter of the party also covered 7 out of 15 city districts. During the 2019 national convention the party changed its organizational structure from having just a deputy leader, to now having a political deputy and a deputy leader.

Per Sandberg, formerly Minister of Fisheries, MP and deputy leader of the Progress Party joined the Capitalist Party during their sixth national congress in Oslo, 13 September 2020. The 2020 national congress also finalized a new national political program, aiming to clarify positions of the party on political direction and issues in the coming parliamentary period from 2021 to 2025.

=== Election history ===
Election Year	Election Type	Number of votes	%
2015	Municipal	458	0%
2017	Parliament	5,599	0.2%
2019	Municipal	4,482	0.2%
2019	County	6,379	0.3%
2021	Parliament	4,520	0.2%

=== Party Congresses ===
- 0. (founding congresse) 7 april 2014 Oslo, Bjerke
- 1. landsmøte 2015 9 may Oslo
- 2. landsmøte 2016 29–30 April Håndverkeren (Oslo)
- 3. landsmøte 2017 29 April Håndverkeren (Oslo)
- 4. landsmøte 2018 28–29 April Oslo
- 5. landsmøte 2019 27–28 April Eventhallen
- 6. landsmøte 2020 12 september Oslo, Løren
- 7. landsmøte 2021 5–6 June Galleri Oslo
- 8. landsmøte 2022 23–24 April Oslo, Norwegian Museum of Science and Technology
- 9. landsmøte 2023 22–23 April Kristiansand
- 10. landsmøte 2024 27–18 April Oslo, DOGA
