= Sidsel Dalen =

Norwegian journalist and crime fiction writer (born 1969)

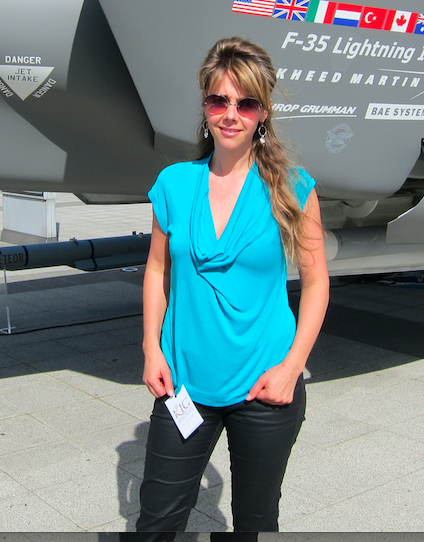
- Born: 27 November 1969 (age 56)
- Occupations: Journalist; Crime fiction writer

Sidsel Dalen (born 27 November 1969) is a Norwegian journalist and crime fiction writer.

== Literary career ==
Dalen made her literary debut in 2011 with Dødelige dråper, a thriller novel set in Rio in Brazil, where the protagonist "Mia Mikkelsen" is a journalist who meets corruption, environmental crimes and abuse of power in the oil industry. Her novel 21 dager (2013) is set in Norway, and was nominated to the Riverton Prize. In the novel Nødhjelp (2015), "Mia" deals with corruption in the Department of Defence.

== Education and journalistic career ==
Dalen graduated in anthropology and mass communication from the Goldsmiths, University of London. She further studied at the University of Oslo and the London School of Economics, graduating in media and European studies. She has worked as freelance journalist for radio, television and printed media. She has won prizes for Web television for Hjemmet Mortensen (in 2007), and for news reports for TVNorge (in 2008). She was awarded the Preben Munthe Fellowship grant for 2016 from the Fritt Ord Foundation, which supported research studies at the Reuters Institute for the Study of Journalism at the University of Oxford.
