= Movimiento Demócrata Liberal =

Political organization based in Venezuela

Movimiento Demócrata Liberal (MDL, Liberal Democratic Movement) is a Venezuelan political organisation.

The MDL is promoting autonomy statutes in at least seven Venezuelan states including Táchira, Sucre, Monagas, Bolívar, Anzoátegui, Aragua, and Falcón.

The MDL lists among its international collaborators Silvio Berlusconi's Forza Italia, the National Alliance party in Italy, the Republican Party in the United States, the right-wing ARENA party in El Salvador, the Independent Democratic Union (UDI) in Chile, and the Popular Party in Spain. Funding organisations include the International Republican Institute (IRI) and the conservative Friedrich Naumann Foundation.

MDL Director Marco Polessel declared in 2009 that he supported the actions of the Honduran Congress in using the military to expel President Manuel Zelaya and install Roberto Micheletti.

== See also ==
- Organization for the Liberal Democracy in Venezuela
