= Liberalism in Albania =

This article gives an overview of liberalism in Albania. It is limited to liberal parties with substantial support, mainly proved by having had a representation in parliament. The sign ⇒ denotes another party in that scheme. For inclusion in this scheme it is not necessary that a party label itself as liberal.

== History ==
A form of radical liberalism was dominant shortly after independence, but became oppressed. After the restoration of democracy in the 1990s, liberalism was and is only a weak political factor. Two parties could be considered to embrace liberal values: the Democratic Alliance Party (Partia Aleanca Demokratike, member LI, ELDR) and the Unity for Human Rights Party (Partia Bashkimi për të Drejtat e Njeriut), which is the party of the ethnic minorities.

=== Democratic Party ===
- 1924: The democratic faction of the Popular Party (Partia Popullore), led by Stylian Fan Noli seceded and established the liberal Democratic Party (Parti Demokratike).
- 1924: The party is banned by the dictatorship

=== Democratic Alliance Party ===
1992: A liberal faction of the conservative Democratic Party of Albania (Partia Demokratike e Shqipërisë) seceded to form the present-day Democratic Alliance Party (Partia Aleanca Demokratike)

== Liberal leaders ==
- Stylian Fan Noli

== See also ==
- History of Albania
- Politics of Albania
- List of political parties in Albania
