= List of heads of government of Cuba =

This article lists the heads of government of Cuba from 1940 until the present day.

== Constitutional background ==
Between 1940 and 1976 (under the 1940 Constitution), the role of the head of government was performed by the Prime Minister of Cuba.

Between 1976 and 2019 (under the 1976 Constitution), the position of prime minister was abolished and replaced by the president of the Council of Ministers.

On 24 February 2019 (under the 2019 Constitution), the position of prime minister was restored.

On 21 December 2019, Manuel Marrero Cruz was appointed as the new prime minister.

== List of officeholders ==
=== Republic of Cuba (1902–1959) ===
No.	Portrait	Name (Birth–Death)	Term of office			Political party	Cabinet(s)	Head(s) of state	Ref.
No.	Portrait	Name (Birth–Death)	Took office	Left office	Time in office	Political party	Cabinet(s)	Head(s) of state	Ref.
Prime Ministers
1		Carlos Saladrigas Zayas (1900–1956)	10 October 1940	16 August 1942	1 year, 310 days	Popular Socialist Party	Zayas	Fulgencio Batista	
2		Ramón Zaydín (1895–1968)	16 August 1942	16 March 1944	1 year, 213 days	Liberal Party	Zaydín	Fulgencio Batista	
3		Anselmo Alliegro y Milá (1899–1961)	16 March 1944	10 October 1944	208 days	Liberal Party	Milá	Fulgencio Batista	
4		Félix Lancís Sánchez (1900–1976)	10 October 1944	13 October 1945	1 year, 3 days	Authentic Party	Sánchez I	Ramón Grau	
5		Carlos Prío Socarrás (1903–1977)	13 October 1945	1 May 1947	1 year, 200 days	Authentic Party	Socarrás	Ramón Grau	
6		Raúl López del Castillo (1893–1963)	1 May 1947	10 October 1948	1 year, 162 days	Authentic Party	Castillo	Ramón Grau	
7		Manuel Antonio de Varona (1908–1992)	10 October 1948	6 October 1950	1 year, 361 days	Authentic Party	Varona	Carlos Prío Socarrás	
(4)		Félix Lancís Sánchez (1900–1976)	6 October 1950	1 October 1951	360 days	Authentic Party	Sánchez II	Carlos Prío Socarrás	
8		Óscar Gans (1903–1965)	1 October 1951	10 March 1952	161 days	Progressive Action Party	Gans	Carlos Prío Socarrás	
9		Fulgencio Batista (1901–1973)	10 March 1952	4 April 1952	25 days	Progressive Action Party	Batista	Himself	
Vacant (4 April 1952 – 24 February 1955)
10		Jorge García Montes (1896–1982)	24 February 1955	26 March 1957	2 years, 30 days	Progressive Action Party	Montes	Fulgencio Batista	
11		Andrés Rivero Agüero (1905–1996)	26 March 1957	6 March 1958	345 days	Progressive Action Party	Agüero	Fulgencio Batista	
12		Emilio Núñez Portuondo (1898–1978)	6 March 1958	12 March 1958	6 days	Progressive Action Party	Portuondo	Fulgencio Batista	
13		Gonzalo Güell (1895–1985)	12 March 1958	1 January 1959	295 days	Progressive Action Party	Güell	Fulgencio Batista	

=== Republic of Cuba (1959–present) ===
No.	Portrait	Name (Birth–Death)	Term of office			Political party	Elected	Cabinet(s)	Head(s) of state	Ref.
No.	Portrait	Name (Birth–Death)	Took office	Left office	Time in office	Political party	Elected	Cabinet(s)	Head(s) of state	Ref.
Prime Ministers
1		José Miró Cardona (1902–1974)	5 January 1959	13 February 1959	39 days	Independent	–	Cardona	Manuel Urrutia Lleó	
2		Fidel Castro (1926–2016)	13 February 1959	2 December 1976	17 years, 293 days	26th of July Movement	–	F. Castro	Manuel Urrutia Lleó	
2		Fidel Castro (1926–2016)	13 February 1959	2 December 1976	17 years, 293 days	26th of July Movement	–	F. Castro	Osvaldo Dorticós Torrado	
2		Fidel Castro (1926–2016)	13 February 1959	2 December 1976	17 years, 293 days	PURSC	–	F. Castro	Osvaldo Dorticós Torrado	
2		Fidel Castro (1926–2016)	13 February 1959	2 December 1976	17 years, 293 days	Communist Party	–	F. Castro	Osvaldo Dorticós Torrado	
Presidents of the Council of Ministers
2		Fidel Castro (1926–2016)	2 December 1976	24 February 2008	31 years, 84 days	Communist Party	1976	F. Castro	Himself (as President of the Council of State)	
2		Fidel Castro (1926–2016)	2 December 1976	24 February 2008	31 years, 84 days	Communist Party	1981	F. Castro	Himself (as President of the Council of State)	
2		Fidel Castro (1926–2016)	2 December 1976	24 February 2008	31 years, 84 days	Communist Party	1986	F. Castro	Himself (as President of the Council of State)	
2		Fidel Castro (1926–2016)	2 December 1976	24 February 2008	31 years, 84 days	Communist Party	1993	F. Castro	Himself (as President of the Council of State)	
2		Fidel Castro (1926–2016)	2 December 1976	24 February 2008	31 years, 84 days	Communist Party	1998	F. Castro	Himself (as President of the Council of State)	
2		Fidel Castro (1926–2016)	2 December 1976	24 February 2008	31 years, 84 days	Communist Party	2003	F. Castro	Himself (as President of the Council of State)	
3		Raúl Castro (born 1931)	24 February 2008	19 April 2018	10 years, 54 days	Communist Party	2008	R. Castro	Himself (as President of the Council of State)	
3		Raúl Castro (born 1931)	24 February 2008	19 April 2018	10 years, 54 days	Communist Party	2013	R. Castro	Himself (as President of the Council of State)	
4		Miguel Díaz-Canel (born 1960)	19 April 2018	21 December 2019	1 year, 246 days	Communist Party	–	Díaz-Canel	Himself (as President of the Council of State)	
Prime Minister
5		Manuel Marrero Cruz (born 1963)	21 December 2019	Incumbent	6 years, 310 days	Communist Party	–	Cruz	Miguel Díaz-Canel	
5		Manuel Marrero Cruz (born 1963)	21 December 2019	Incumbent	6 years, 310 days	Communist Party	2023	Cruz	Miguel Díaz-Canel	

== See also ==
- Captaincy General of Cuba
- Military Government of Cuba
- Provisional Government of Cuba
- List of colonial governors of Cuba
- Republic of Cuba (1902–1959)
- Council of State (Cuba)
  - President of Cuba
  - Vice President of Cuba
- Council of Ministers (Cuba)
  - Prime Minister of Cuba
- Guantanamo Bay Naval Base
  - List of commanders of Guantanamo Bay Naval Base
