= 1958 Cuban general election =

- 3 November 1958
- Presidential election
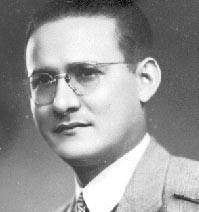

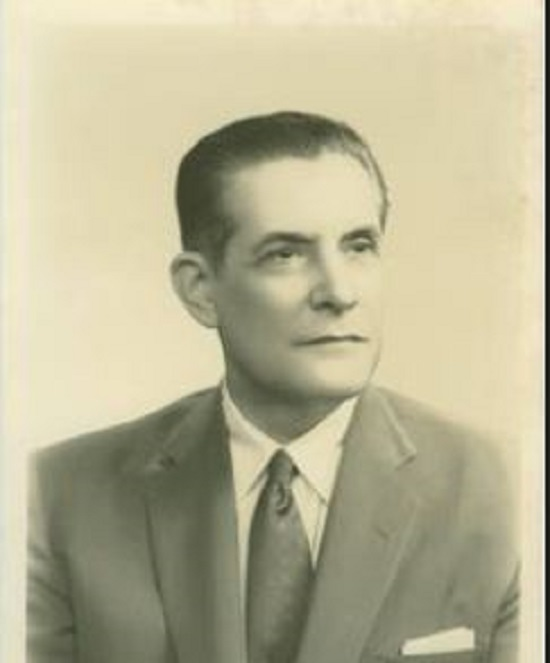

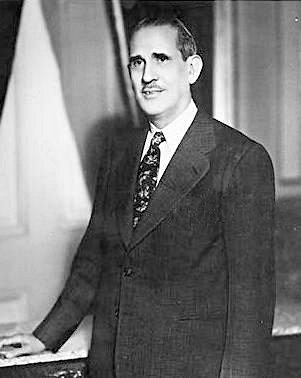
Nominee	Andrés Rivero Agüero	Carlos Márquez Sterling	Ramón Grau
Party	Progressive Action	PPL	Auténtico
Popular vote	428,166	95,447	75,789
Percentage	70.40%	15.69%	12.46%
President before election
Fulgencio Batista
Progressive Action Party
Elected President
Andrés Rivero Agüero (elected)
Manuel Urrutia Lleó (appointed)
Independent

General elections were held in Cuba on 3 November 1958. The three major presidential candidates were Carlos Márquez Sterling of the Partido del Pueblo Libre, Ramón Grau of the Partido Auténtico and Andrés Rivero Agüero of the Coalición Progresista Nacional. There was also a minor party candidate on the ballot, Alberto Salas Amaro for Partido Union Cubana, who received 1% of the vote. Voter turnout was estimated at 50% of eligible voters. Although Andrés Rivero Agüero won the presidential election with 70% of the vote, he and all other elected officials were unable to take office due to the Cuban Revolution, which overthrew then-president Fulgencio Batista. This was the last competitive election in Cuba.

With the revolution overthrowing Batista, Anselmo Alliegro y Milá briefly became president on 1 January 1959, before being replaced by the Chief Justice Carlos Manuel Piedra the following day, who in turn was replaced by Manuel Urrutia Lleó a day later. The 1940 constitution was abrogated and the Congress was quickly dissolved by the revolutionaries shortly thereafter.

== Background ==
The rebels had publicly called for an election boycott, issuing its Total War Manifesto on 12 March 1958.

== Results ==
=== President ===
Candidate	Party	Votes	%
Andrés Rivero Agüero	National Progressive Coalition	428,166	70.40
Carlos Márquez Sterling	Partido del Pueblo Libre	95,447	15.69
Ramón Grau	Partido Auténtico	75,789	12.46
Alberto Salas Amaro	Partido Unión Cubana	8,752	1.44
Total		608,154	100.00
Source: Bonachea & San Martin

=== Chamber of Representatives ===
The 166 members of the Chamber of Representatives were elected; 85 for a four-year term 81 for a two-year term.

Party	Seats
Progressive Action Party	65
Liberal Party of Cuba	25
Democratic Party	22
Radical Union	21
Partido Auténtico	17
Partido del Pueblo Libre	14
Partido Unión Cubana	2
Total	166
Source: Diario de la Marina

== Aftermath ==
Rivero Agüero was due to be sworn in on 24 February 1959. In a conversation between him and the American ambassador Earl E. T. Smith on 15 November 1958, he called Castro a "sick man" and stated it would be impossible to reach a settlement with him. Rivero Agüero also said that he planned to restore constitutional government and would convene a Constitutional Assembly after taking office.

Ultimately, none of the officials elected in this election were able to ever take office, as a result of the Cuban Revolution overthrowing President Fulgencio Batista on 1 January 1959.

== See also ==
- Cuba–United States relations
- History of Cuba
- Timeline of Cuban history
- 1940 Constitution of Cuba
- Earl E. T. Smith
