= Elisa Godínez Gómez de Batista =

First Lady of Cuba

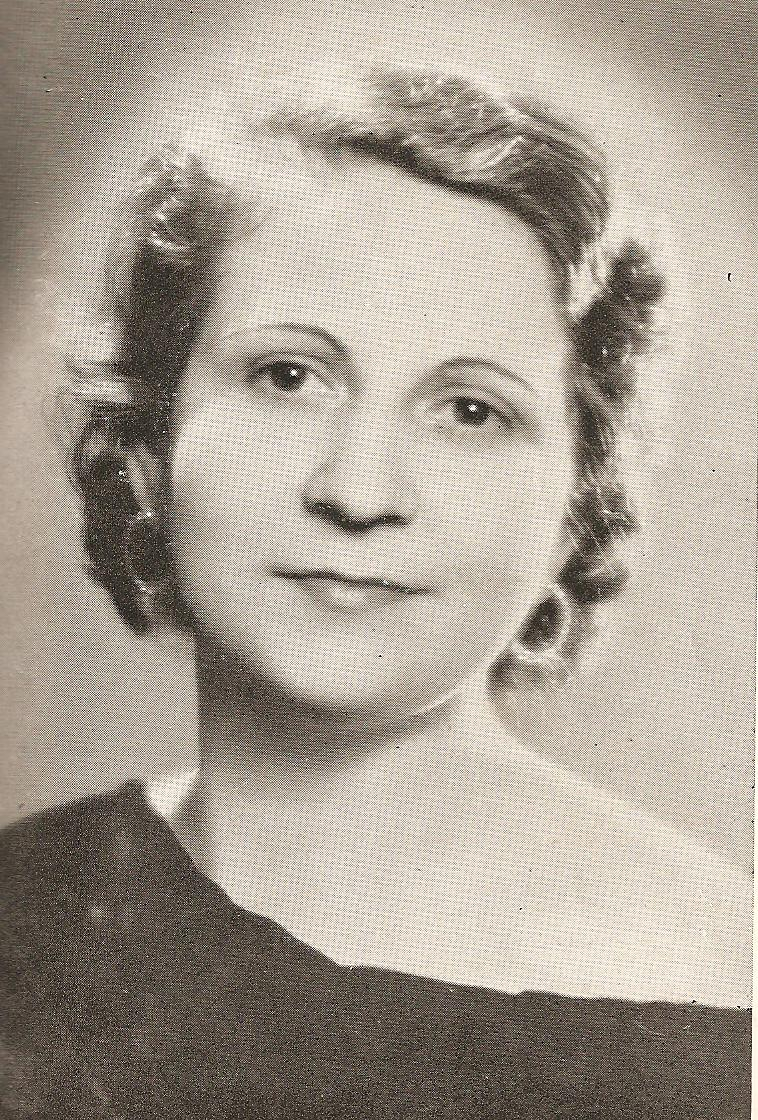
- Godínez in 1939

First Lady of Cuba
- In office 10 October 1940 – 10 October 1944
- Preceded by: Leonor Montes de Bru
- Succeeded by: Paulina Alsina Fernández

Personal details
- Born: Elisa Godínez Gómez; 2 December 1904 Vereda Nueva, La Habana Province, Cuba
- Died: 19 June 1993 (aged 88) Miami, Florida, United States
- Spouse(s): Fulgencio Batista (m. 1926; div. 1945) Máximo Rodríguez (died 1962)
- Children: 3

Elisa Godínez Gómez de Batista (née Godínez Gómez; December 2, 1904 – June 19, 1993) was the First Lady of Cuba from 1940 to 1944 as the first wife of Cuban then-president (later dictator) Fulgencio Batista.

== Biography ==
Godínez was born in a small farmhouse in the village of Vereda Nueva in Havana Province, as one of nine children born to Salustiano Godínez y Córdoba and Concepción Gómez y Acosta.

Godínez, who shared his humble origins, married Fulgencio Batista in 1926. They had a son, Fulgencio Rubén, and two daughters, Mirta and Elisa Aleida. They divorced in 1945.

Godínez married her second husband, Máximo Rodríguez, a former member of the Cuban Congress, and they immigrated to the United States in 1959, settling in Miami, Florida. Rodríguez died in 1962, and Godínez resided in Miami until her death there on June 19, 1993, at age 88.

One of her grandsons (the son of Elisa Aleida Batista) is Raoul G. Cantero III, a Justice of the Florida Supreme Court from 2002 to 2008.
