= Congress of the Communist Party of Cuba =

Decision-making body of the Communist Party of Cuba

The Congress of the Communist Party of Cuba (Spanish: Congreso del Partido Comunista de Cuba) is the highest decision-making body of that party.

== Convocations ==
Congress	Duration (start—end)	Delegates	CC elected	Central Report (presented by)	Charter (amendments)	PMR
1st Congress; 6 days 1975 election	17 December – 22 December 1975	3,116	? FM – 14 AM	Fidel Castro	Adopted	—
2nd Congress; 4 days 1979–1980 election	17 December – 20 December 1980	1,780	148 FM – ? CM	Fidel Castro	Amendment	—
3rd Congress; 4 days 1985–1986 election	4 February – 7 February 1986	1,784	146 FM – 79 AM	Fidel Castro	Amendment	—
4th Congress; 5 days 1990–1991 election	10 October – 14 October 1991	1,772	225	Fidel Castro	Amendment	—
5th Congress; 4 days 1996–1997 election	8 October – 10 October 1997	1,500	150	Fidel Castro	Amendment	—
6th Congress; 4 days 2010–2011 election	16 April – 19 April 2011	997	115	Raúl Castro	Amendment	800,000
7th Congress; 4 days 2015–2016 election	16 April – 19 April 2016	995	142	Raúl Castro	—	670,000
8th Congress; 4 days 2020–2021 election	16 April – 19 April 2021	300		Raúl Castro	Approved	700,000
