= Carlos Márquez Sterling =

Cuban lawyer, writer, politician and diplomat

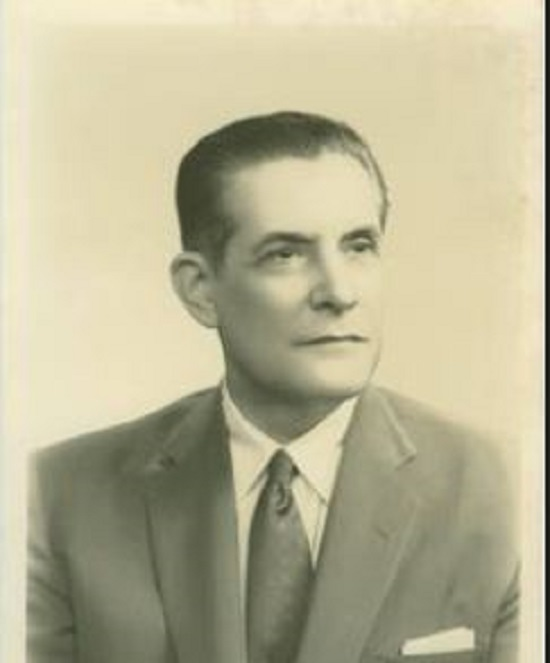
- Born: September 8, 1898; Camagüey, Captaincy General of Cuba, Spanish Empire
- Died: May 3, 1991 (aged 92); Miami, Florida, United States
- Education: University of Havana
- Occupations: Former Speaker of the Cuban House of Representatives and president of the Cuban constitutional convention of 1940

Dr. Carlos Márquez Sterling y Guiral (September 8, 1898 – May 3, 1991) was a Cuban lawyer, writer, politician and diplomat.

== Political career ==
Born Carlos Guiral y Márquez Sterling on September 8, 1898, in Camagüey, Cuba, Márquez Sterling was the son of Captain Guillermo Guiral Dominguez of the Spanish Army and Maria Dolores Márquez Sterling y Loret de Mola, the sister of Cuban President Manuel Márquez Sterling who also served as Cuba's Ambassador to the United States for a short time in 1934. He married twice, first Silvia Dominguez y O'Mahony and then Uva Hernandez Cata. He had two sons, Carlos and Manuel Marquez Sterling y Dominguez (Cuba, 1931-U.S. 2022).

Márquez Sterling was an attorney and professor of political economy at the University of Havana. He served as a member of Cuba's House of Representatives as a member of the Liberal Party and was elected president of that body in April 1936 after weeks of deadlocked negotiations among parties, none of which controlled a majority of votes in the chamber. Following the impeachment of President Miguel Mariano Gomez in December, which ended the three-party coalition that had supported him, he was forced to resign in February 1937 following a 101 to 28 vote of no confidence. He also served as Minister of State and Minister of Education.

In 1940, he was the president of the constitutional assembly that over six months wrote the 1940 Constitution of Cuba. President Fulgencio Batista named him Secretary of Labor in his first cabinet in 1940 (one month). He resigned after a few weeks to seek election as president of the House of Representatives, a post he held for about a year before resigning for reasons of ill health in August 1942.

In the 1950s, he was detained many times by the government of Fulgencio Batista because of his opposition to Batista dictatorship.

He ran unsuccessfully in the 1958 Cuban general election for President of Cuba as head of the Free Peoples Party. The following year the government of Fidel Castro placed him under house arrest. He then went into exile.

== Exile ==
He taught at Columbia University and at C.W. Post College on Long Island. In 1979, he moved to Miami and taught at Biscayne College (now St. Thomas University) and gave conferences at Florida International University. He also wrote opinion columns for the Spanish-language newspaper Diario Las Américas. He authored more than twenty books, including a history of Cuba, Historia de Cuba Desde Colón Hasta Castro (1963).

In 1984, the Florida House of Representatives honored him for his contribution to "Cuba, democracy, justice and liberty".

He died on May 3, 1991, in Miami, Florida. He is buried in Miami Memorial Park Cemetery.

== See also ==
- Humboldt 7 massacre
- Directorio Revolucionario Estudiantil

== Sources ==
- Carlos Márquez Sterling, Memorias de un estadista: Frases y escritos en correspondencia (edited by Manuel Márquez Sterling) (Miami, Florida: Ediciones Universal, 2005) ISBN 1-59388-051-0 (in Spanish)
- Cuba: Anuario Historico 1991; Esteban M. Beruvides (Miami, Florida: AD Ventures International, 1992) (in Spanish)
- Memorias de Carlos Márquez Sterling", extensive video interview produced as part of Florida International University Cuban Living History Project. The documentary is available at FIU's Green Library as part of the Cuban Living History collection ((Coral Gables, Florida: Village Films; 1990) (in Spanish) video clip
- Cuba and Its Right to Freedom; Lincoln Rodon Alvarez (Miami, Florida: Editorial Laurenty Publishing Inc., 1987)
- Fulgencio Batista: From Revolutionary to Strongman; Frank Argote-Freyre (New Brunswick, New Jersey: Rutgers University Press, 2006) ISBN 978-0-8135-3701-6
- Semper Fidel: America & Cuba 1776–1988; Michael J. Mazarr (Baltimore, Maryland: The Nautical & Aviation Publishing Company of America, Inc., 1988)
- Cuba or the Pursuit of Freedom; Hugh Thomas (London, Great Britain: Eyre & Spottiswoode Ltd., 1971)
- Directorio Social de la Habana 1948, (Havana, Cuba: P. Fernandez y Cia S.A.) (in Spanish)
- Registro Social de la Habana 1958 (Havana, Cuba: Molina y Cia S.A., 1958) (in Spanish)
- Anuario de Familias Cubanas 1988 (Miami, Florida: Trejos Hermanos Sucrs., Inc., 1988) (in Spanish)
- Historia de Familias Cubanas (Miami, Florida: Ediciones Universal, 1985) ISBN 0-89729-380-0) (in Spanish)
