= 1954 Cuban general election =

- 1 November 1954
- Presidential election
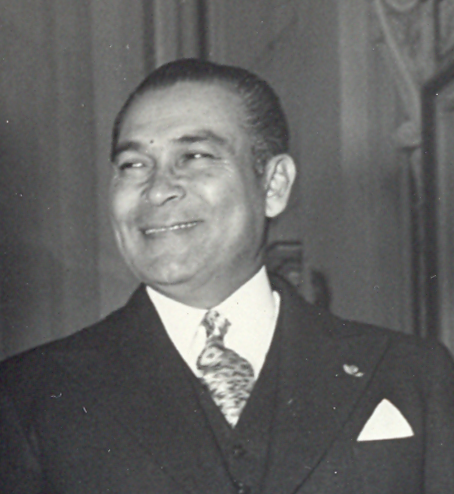

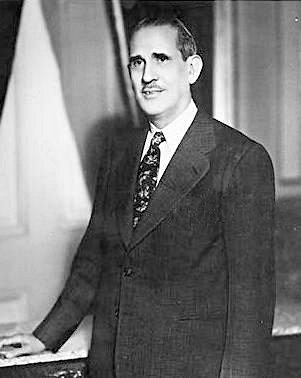
Nominee	Fulgencio Batista	Ramón Grau
Party	Progressive Action	Auténtico
Alliance	CPN
Popular vote	1,262,587	188,209
President before election
Fulgencio Batista
Progressive Action
Elected President
Fulgencio Batista
CPN

General elections were held in Cuba on 1 November 1954. Fulgencio Batista won the presidential election running under the National Progressive Coalition banner, whilst the main opposition candidate, Ramón Grau, withdrew his candidacy before election day. Progressive Action Party emerged as the largest party in the House of Representatives, winning 60 of the 130 seats. Voter turnout was 52%. Batista's new presidential term was scheduled to be from 24 February 1955 to 24 February 1959.

== Results ==
=== President ===
Candidate	Party	Votes	%
Fulgencio Batista	National Progressive Coalition (Note: Alliance of the Progressive Action Party, the Radical Union, the Democratic Party and the Liberal Party)	1,262,587	
Ramón Grau	Partido Auténtico	188,209	
Total			
Total votes		1,451,753	–
Registered voters/turnout		2,768,186	52.44
Source: Nohlen

=== Senate ===
Party	Seats
National Progressive Coalition	36
Partido Auténtico	18
Total	54
Source: Nohlen

=== House of Representatives ===
Party or alliance		Seats
National Progressive Coalition	Progressive Action Party	60
National Progressive Coalition	Liberal Party of Cuba	24
National Progressive Coalition	Democratic Party	15
National Progressive Coalition	Radical Union	15
Partido Auténtico		16
Total		130
Source: Nohlen
