= ¡Hasta la victoria siempre! =

Cuban political slogan

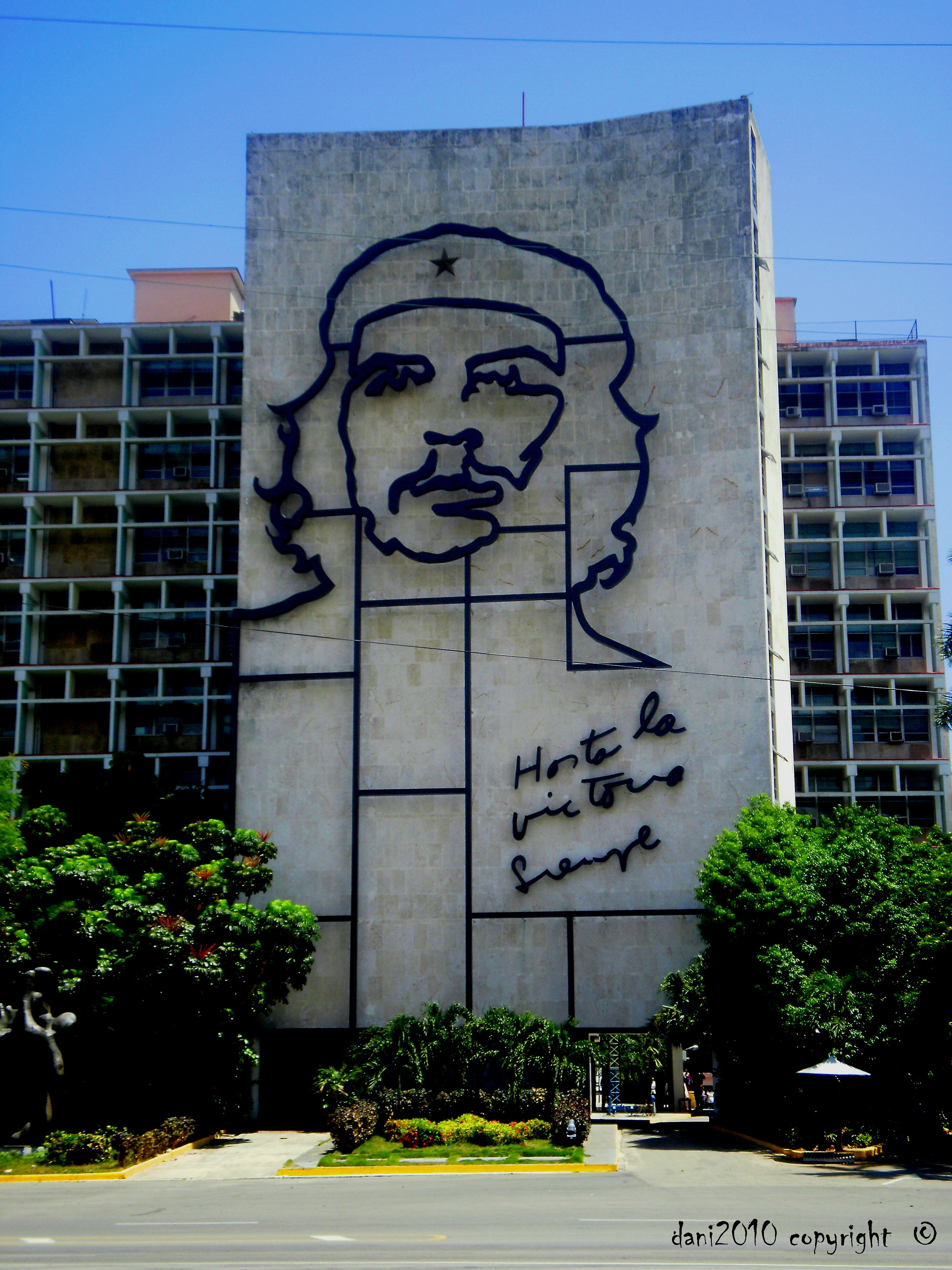
Painting of Che Guevara, "Ever onward to victory" is written below.

¡Hasta la victoria siempre! (English: Ever onward to victory!) is a Cuban political slogan written by Che Guevara in his farewell letter to Fidel Castro as he was resigning from Communist Party of Cuba. The phrase is used worldwide by pro-Castro left-wing groups.

== History ==
Che Guevara wrote the phrase in a letter addressing Fidel Castro on April 1, 1965, as he resigned from PCC and traveled to Congo and later to Bolivia to spread the "revolution", before being executed by Bolivian Special Forces on October 9, 1967. Castro publicly read the letter during a speech on October 3, 1965, where he announced Che's resignation from Communist Party of Cuba. Castro read "Ever onwards to victory" as he finished his speech.

In 1965, Carlos Puebla published a famous song Hasta siempre, Comandante, the title of the song is based on the slogan.

== See also ==
- Cuban Revolution
- Ñancahuazú Guerrilla
