= Jorge García Montes =

Cuban lawyer and politician

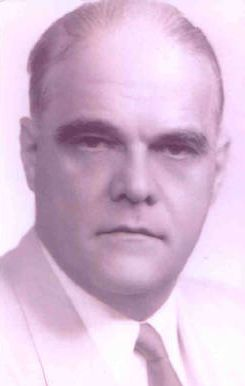

10th Prime Minister of Cuba
- In office 24 February 1955 – 26 March 1957
- President: Fulgencio Batista
- Preceded by: Fulgencio Batista
- Succeeded by: Andrés Rivero

Senator of the Cuban Senate
- In office 1954–1959

Representative of the Cuban Chamber of Representatives
- In office 1922–1944

Personal details
- Born: Jorge García Montes y Hernandez; 19 October 1896 New York City, New York, U.S.
- Died: 21 June 1982 (aged 85) Miami, Florida, U.S.
- Party: Liberal
- Spouse: Concepción Morales y de la Torre (after 1924)
- Children: 1
- Education: University of Havana

Jorge García Montes y Hernandez (19 October 1896 – 21 June 1982) was a Cuban lawyer and politician.

Montes was born in New York City on 19 October 1896, where his father, José María García Montes, was in exile during the Cuban War of Independence against the Spaniards. Montes graduated from the University of Havana School of Law in 1917. He married Concepción Morales y de la Torre (1905–) on 21 January 1924 in Havana and they had a daughter, Graciela.

He was a Representative from 1922–1944 as a member of the Liberal Party of Cuba. He went into exile during the Cuban Revolution of 1933 that overthrew General Gerardo Machado, and returned two years later. He was a Senator from 1954 to 1959, and Prime Minister from 24 February 1955 to 26 March 1957, in the government of General Fulgencio Batista. He was then Minister of Education between 1957 and 1959. He went into exile again following the Cuban Revolution of 1958, leaving Cuba in April 1959 through the Colombian Embassy and arrived in the United States in May or June 1959. In exile, he wrote the book History of the Communist Party of Cuba with Antonio Alonso Ávila.

He died in exile on 21 June 1982 at the Mercy Hospital in Miami, Florida.
