= Progressive Action Party =

Former political party in Cuba (1949–59)

Progressive Action Party Partido Acción Progresista
- Abbreviation: PAP
- Leader: Fulgencio Batista
- Founded: 1949
- Dissolved: 1959
- Split from: Liberal Party of Cuba
- Headquarters: Havana
- Ideology: Authoritarianism; Conservatism; Economic liberalism Liberalism; Anti-communism; Right-wing populism Militarism; Keynesianism (in practice)
- Political position: Right-wing

The Progressive Action Party (Spanish: Partido Acción Progresista, PAP) was a Cuban political party led by Fulgencio Batista. The party was founded on 1 April 1949, in the aftermath of the 1948 general elections, under the name of Unitary Action Party (Spanish: Partido Acción Unitaria, PAU). It presented its first manifesto a few months later, on 1 August. In 1952, certain to lose the election, Batista made a coup d'état by seizing the Presidency.

The party also ran in the elections of 1954 and 1958, winning due to the early withdrawal of opponents, as well as electoral fraud.

The party was based on a combination of strong conservatism and economic liberalism on a large scale, to attract American capital in Cuba. This led to a high level of corruption and poverty plaguing the country. The other bulwark of the party was anti-communism, not only because of the alignment with the United States but also because most of the members of the anti-Batista left-wing nationalist 26th of July Movement could be branded as Communists, including Fidel Castro and Camilo Cienfuegos, along with genuine communists like Raúl Castro and Che Guevara. Batista's authoritarian rule and repression in response to Castro's movement led to the deaths of 1,583–1,816 Cubans through torture and extrajudicial killing.

The party was dissolved following the Cuban Revolution of 1959, which ousted Batista causing it to flee abroad and led to the establishment of the revolutionary government of Fidel Castro, which officially became a communist regime in 1961.

== Electoral history ==
=== Presidential elections ===
Election	Party candidate	Votes	%	Result
1954	Fulgencio Batista	1,262,587		Elected ✓
1958	Andrés Rivero Agüero	428,166	70.40%	Elected ✓

Note

Andrés Rivero Agüero was unable to take office due to the Cuban Revolution

=== House of Representatives elections ===
Election	Party leader	Seats	+/–	Position
1950	Fulgencio Batista	4 / 66	▲4	▲4th
1954	Fulgencio Batista	60 / 130	▲56	▲1st
1958	Fulgencio Batista	65 / 130	▲5	1st

=== Senate elections ===
Election	Party leader	Votes	%	Seats	+/–	Position
1954	Fulgencio Batista	(part of the National Progressive Coalition (Note: The National Progressive Coalition was an alliance of PAP, the Radical Union, the Republican Democratic Party and the Liberal Party.))		36 / 54	▲36	▲1st
