= 1981 Cuban parliamentary election =

- 28 December 1981

All 499 seats in the National Assembly of People's Power Indirectly elected by municipal assemblies
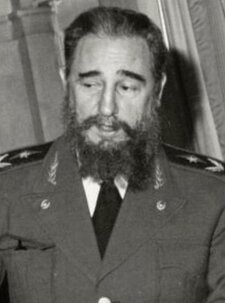
	First party
Leader	Fidel Castro
Party	PCC
Seats won	499
Seat change	▲10
President of the Council of Ministers before election
Fidel Castro
PCC
Elected President of the Council of Ministers
Fidel Castro
PCC

Indirect parliamentary elections were held in Cuba on 28 December 1981.

On 11 and 18 October voters elected members of the 169 Municipal Assemblies. A total of 6,097,139 votes were cast in the first round (11 October) and in the second round (18 October), giving a turnout of 97% in the first round and 93.6% in the second. The elected members of the Municipal Assemblies then elected the 499 members of the National Assembly. Candidates were selected by a commission composed of the Communist Party, the Young Communist League or mass organisations.
