= List of commanders of Guantanamo Bay Naval Base =

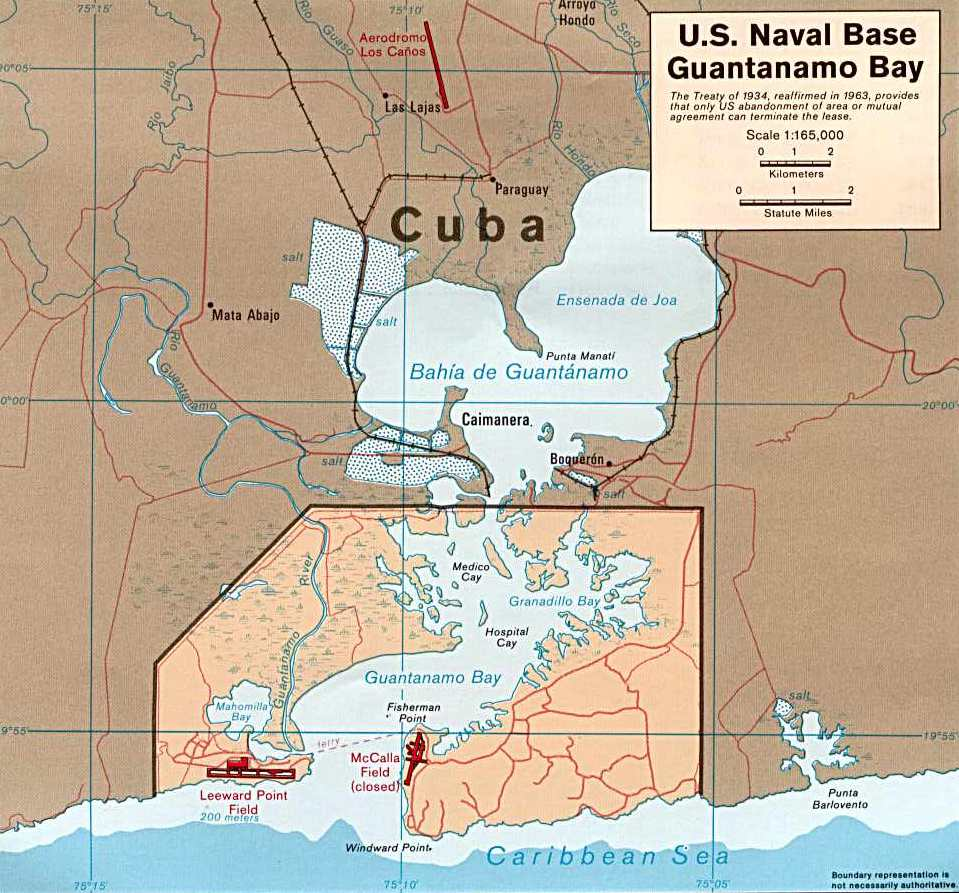
Map of Guantánamo Bay showing approximate U.S. Naval Base boundaries.

This is a listing of commandants and commanders of the Guantanamo Bay Naval Base, located in Guantánamo Bay on Cuba.

== Brief timeline ==
- 10 June 1898 : U.S. occupation.
- 23 February 1903 : U.S. leases naval station at Guantánamo Bay in Cuba.
- 6 October 1903 : Guantanamo Bay Naval Station leased to U.S.
- 12 December 1913 : Naval Station officially opens. Cuban flag lowered.
- 31 May 1934 : The 1934 Treaty of Relations abrogates the 1903 Treaty of Relations, explicitly spells out the right for the US to walk away from the lease.
- 1 April 1941 : Renamed Guantanamo Bay U.S. Naval Operating Base, after vast construction program for build-up of the Station Frederick Snare Corporation.
- 18 June 1952 : Renamed Guantanamo Bay U.S. Naval Base.

== List of commanders and commandants ==
=== Commandants ===
- 10 December 1903 – May 1904 : William H. Allen
- 17 May 1904 – September 1906 : Charles C. Rogers
- 8 September 1906 – July 1907 : Albert A. Ackerman
- August 1907 – May 1908 : Clark D. Stearns (acting)
- May 1908 – April 1909 : Charles H. Harlow
- May 1909 – November 1909 : Myles Joyce (acting)
- November 1909 – January 1912 : Walter Ball
- 18 January 1912 – June 1913 : George W. Kline
- June 1913 – January 1914 : Merritt S. Corning (acting)
- January 1914 – October 1914 : Hilary Williams
- December 1914 – May 1916 : John M. Luby
- 4 May 1916 – September 1917 : CDR Dudley Wright Knox
- September 1917 – November 1918 : E.E. Wright
- December 1918 – September 1920 : Guy Whitlock
- September 1920 – June 1921 : John J. Hannigan
- June 1921 – May 1923 : Robert T. Menner
- May 1923 – June 1924 : Ward K. Wortman
- June 1924 – June 1926 : Charles M. Tozer
- June 1926 – August 1928 : Charles C. Soule Jr.
- August 1928 – June 1930 : Charles S. McWhorter
- August 1930 – February 1931 : Alfred Hart Miles
- February 1931 – May 1933 : Thomas L. Johnson
- June 1933 – June 1934 : Edward C. Raguet
- June 1934 – April 1936 : Charles "Savvy" M. Cooke Jr.
- May 1936 – June 1938 : Mark L. Hersey Jr.
- June 1938 – August 1940 : Worral Reed Carter
- September 1940 – March 1944 : George L. Weyler

=== Commanders ===
- April 1944 – October 1944 : F.A. Braisted
- October 1944 – December 1945 : J.J. Mahoney
- January 1946 – May 1948 : C.E. Battle Jr.
- June 1948 – June 1950 : W.K. Phillips
- June 1950 – December 1950 : A.M. Bledsoe
- December 1950 – January 1953 : M.E. Murphy
- January 1953 – December 1953 : C.L.C. Atkeson
- December 1953 - February 1954: Frank Bruner
- February 1954 – September 1955 : E.B. Taylor
- September 1955 – October 1956 : W.G. Cooper
- December 1956 – November 1958 : R.B. Ellis
- November 1958 – October 1960 : Frank W. Fenno
- December 1960 - 22 December 1962 : RADM Edward J. O'Donnell
- 22 December 1962 – December 1963 : RADM J.W. Davis
- December 1963 – June 1966 : RADM John D. Bulkeley
- June 1966 – July 1968 : E.R. Crawford
- July 1968 – June 1970 : James B. Hildreth
- June 1970 – August 1972 : B. McCauley
- August 1972 – June 1973 : Leo B. McCuddin
- June 1973 – July 1975 : Ralph M. Ghormley
- July 1975 – June 1977 : John H. McConnell
- June 1977 – 7 February 1979 : David W. DeCook
- 7 February 1979 – 20 March 1981 : John H. Fetterman Jr.
- 20 March 1981 – 18 October 1983 : M.D. Fitzgerald
- 18 October 1983 – 28 October 1985 : R.A. Allen
- 28 October 1985 – 26 April 1988 : John R. Condon
- 26 April 1988 – 14 June 1990 : John S. Boyd
- 14 June 1990 – 21 August 1992 : W.C. McCamy Jr.
- 21 August 1992 – 2 September 1994 : W.M. DeSpain
- 2 September 1994 – 15 September 1995 : James F. Boland Jr.
- 15 September 1995 – 25 April 1997 : Jim Cannon
- 25 April 1997 – 12 May 2000 : Larry E. Larson
- 12 May 2000 – 27 March 2003 : Robert A. Buehn
- 27 March 2003 – 9 July 2005 : Leslie J. McCoy
- 9 July 2005 – 19 September 2005 : Lawrence S. Cotton Jr.
- 19 September 2005 – September 2008 : CAPT Mark M. Leary
- September 2008 – September 2010 : CAPT Steve Blaisdell
- September 2010 – July 2012 : CAPT Kirk Hibbert
- July 2012 – January 2015 : CAPT J.R. Nettleton, relieved by RADM Mary M. Jackson
- January 2015 – March 2015 : CAPT Scott Gray
- March 2015 – June 2018 : CAPT David C. Culpepper
- June 2018 – June 2021 : CAPT John Fischer
- June 2021 – present : CAPT Samuel White
