= 2003 Cuban parliamentary election =

- 19 January 2003

All 609 seats in the National Assembly of People's Power 305 seats needed for a majority
- Registered: 8,313,770
- Turnout: 97.64% (▼0.71pp)
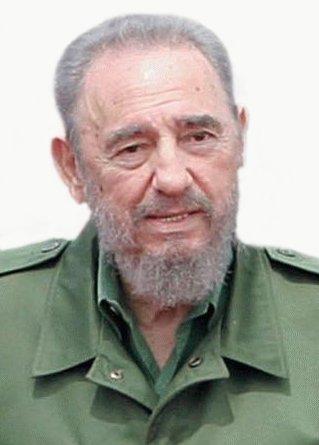
	First party
Leader	Fidel Castro
Party	PCC
Seats won	609
Seat change	▲8
Popular vote	7,128,860
Percentage	91.35%
- Results by province (Shaded by percentage of voters who cast votes for the entire list of candidates, as opposed to selective votes.)
President of the Council of Ministers before election
Fidel Castro
PCC
Elected President of the Council of Ministers
Fidel Castro
PCC

Legislative elections were held for the National Assembly of People's Power, Cuba's national legislature, on 19 January 2003. The vote is an endorsement of pre-selected candidates rather than a choice between rivals. Half of the candidates are nominated at public meetings before gaining approval from electoral committees, while the other half are nominated by official mass organisations (such as trade unions, farmers organisations and students' unions).

The government claims that the election represents a show of popular support, but its critics have attributed the result instead to fear or apathy on the part of those who do not support the government. They suspect that the result may reflect electoral engineering (in constituencies known to have a high proportion of voters who are more inclined to express dissatisfaction by registering blank or spoiled votes, the candidates offered tend to be highly respected local figures not associated closely with the government), the lack of independent supervision of the count or the barrage of propaganda. They also point out that the system of selection of candidates effectively excludes any truly independent voices.

In the run-up to the election, U.S. President George W. Bush described the process as "a fraud and a sham" adding "If Cuba's government takes all the necessary steps to ensure that the 2003 elections are certifiably free and fair, and if Cuba also begins to adopt meaningful market-based reforms, then, and only then, will I work with the United States Congress to ease the ban on trade and travel".

== Results ==
Party	Votes	%	Seats
Communist Party of Cuba and affiliated (entire list)	7,128,860	91.35	609
Communist Party of Cuba and affiliated (selective votes)	675,038	8.65	609
Total	7,803,898	100.00	609
Valid votes	7,803,898	96.14	
Invalid/blank votes	313,253	3.86	
Total votes	8,117,151	100.00	
Registered voters/turnout	8,313,770	97.64	
Source: Granma

=== Results of notable candidates ===
Candidate	Notes	%
Fidel Castro	President, Communist Party leader, and original Granma revolutionary	99.01%
Raúl Castro	Vice-president, Defence minister, Fidel's Brother, and original Granma revolutionary	99.75%
Juan Miguel González	Father of Elián González	93.34%
José Rubiera	Meteorologist, and head of Cuba's hurricane defence system	96.71%
Silvio Rodríguez Domínguez	Popular musician, singer and poet	94.71%
Eva Esther Ribalta Castillo	Candidate with lowest approval vote percentage	85.15%
Average of all candidates	Average of approval vote percentage	94.83%

== See also ==
- Cuba and democracy
