= 2013 Cuban parliamentary election =

- 3 February 2013

All 612 seats in the National Assembly of People's Power 307 seats needed for a majority
- Registered: 8,668,457
- Turnout: 90.88% (▼6.01pp)
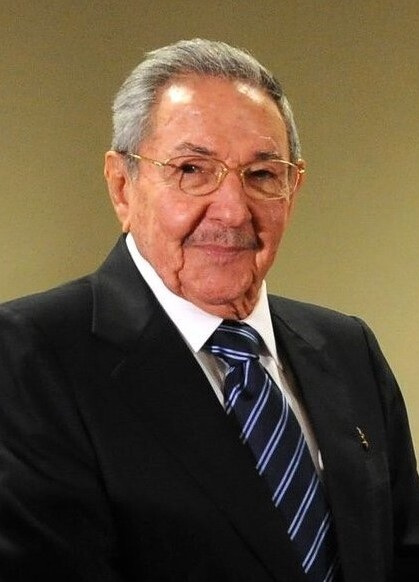
	First party
Leader	Raúl Castro
Party	PCC
Seats won	612
Seat change	▼2
Popular vote	6,031,215
Percentage	81.30%
Swing	▼9.60 pp
- Results by province (Shaded by percentage of voters who cast votes for the entire list of candidates, as opposed to selective votes.)
President of the Council of Ministers before election
Raúl Castro
PCC
Elected President of the Council of Ministers
Raúl Castro
PCC

Parliamentary elections were held in Cuba on 3 February 2013.

== Electoral system ==
The 612 members of the National Assembly of People's Power were elected in single-member constituencies. Candidates had to obtain at least 50% of the valid votes in a constituency to be elected. If no candidate passed the 50% threshold, the seat was left vacant unless the Council of State chose to hold a by-election.

Only one candidate stood in each constituency, having been approved by the National Candidature Commission. The electoral law in force at the time stated that half of the candidates had to be municipal councillors, whilst the remaining half were put forward by assemblies composed of members of the Committees for the Defense of the Revolution and groups representing farmers, students, women, workers and young people.

== Results ==
Party	Votes	%	Seats
Communist Party of Cuba and affiliated (entire list)	6,031,215	81.30	612
Communist Party of Cuba and affiliated (selective votes)	1,387,307	18.70	612
Total	7,418,522	100.00	612
Valid votes	7,418,522	94.17	
Invalid votes	94,808	1.20	
Blank votes	364,576	4.63	
Total votes	7,877,906	100.00	
Registered voters/turnout	8,668,457	90.88	
Source: Juventud Rebelde
