= 1976 Cuban parliamentary election =

- 2 November 1976

All 489 seats in the National Assembly of People's Power Indirectly elected by municipal assemblies
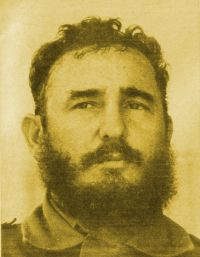
	First party
Leader	Fidel Castro
Party	PCC
Seats won	489
Prime Minister before election
Fidel Castro
PCC
Elected Prime Minister
Fidel Castro
PCC

Indirect parliamentary elections were held in Cuba on 2 November 1976, the first since the Cuban Revolution.

Between December 1975 and November 1976 voters had elected members of the 169 Municipal Assemblies, who in turn elected the 489 members of the National Assembly. Candidates had to be members of the Communist Party or mass organisations. Of the members elected to the National Assembly, 30% worked in industry or public services (including education), 29% were local government officials and 12% were civil servants. Municipal Assembly members also elected members of the 14 Provincial Assemblies.

In the municipal elections there were around 30,000 candidates, with over five million citizens casting their vote.
