= Communist Party of Cuba =

Sole ruling party of Cuba

Coordinates: 20°59′27.7″N 77°25′41.5″W

Communist Party of Cuba Partido Comunista de Cuba
- First Secretary: Miguel Díaz-Canel
- Founder: Fidel Castro
- Founded: 3 October 1965 (61 years, 40 days)
- Preceded by: United Party of the Socialist Revolution of Cuba
- Headquarters: Palacio de la Revolución, Plaza de la Revolución, Havana
- Newspaper: Granma
- Youth wing: Young Communist League
- Women's wing: Federation of Cuban Women
- Children's wing: José Martí Pioneer Organization
- Armed wing: Cuban Revolutionary Armed Forces
- Paramilitary wing: Committees for the Defense of the Revolution
- Union affiliation: Workers' Central Union of Cuba
- Membership (2022): 700,000+
- Ideology: Communism; Marxism–Leninism
- Political position: Far-left
- Regional affiliation: COPPPAL; São Paulo Forum
- International affiliation: IMCWP; For the Freedom of Nations!
- Colors: Red Blue
- Slogan: ¡Hasta la victoria siempre! ("Ever onward to victory!")
- National Assembly of People's Power: 442 / 470 (94%)

Party flag

Website
- www.pcc.cu

The Communist Party of Cuba (Spanish: Partido Comunista de Cuba, PCC) is the sole ruling party of Cuba. It was founded on 3 October 1965 as the successor to the United Party of the Cuban Socialist Revolution, which was in turn made up of the 26th of July Movement and Popular Socialist Party that seized power in Cuba after the 1959 Cuban Revolution. The party governs Cuba as an authoritarian one-party state where dissidence and political opposition are prohibited and repressed. The Cuban constitution ascribes the role of the party to be the "leading force of society and of the state."

The highest body within the PCC is the Party Congress, which convenes every five years. When the Congress is not in session, the Central Committee is the highest body. Because the Central Committee meets twice a year, most day-to-day duties and responsibilities are vested in the Politburo. Since April 2021, the First Secretary of the Central Committee has been Miguel Díaz-Canel, who has been serving as President of Cuba since 2018.

Marxism–Leninism was gradually formalized as the party's guiding ideology and remains so to this day. The party pursues state socialism, under a planned economy which is implemented throughout Cuba despite the long-term embargo by the United States. The PCC also supports Castroism and Guevarism and is a member of the International Meeting of Communist and Workers' Parties.

== History ==
=== Consolidation ===
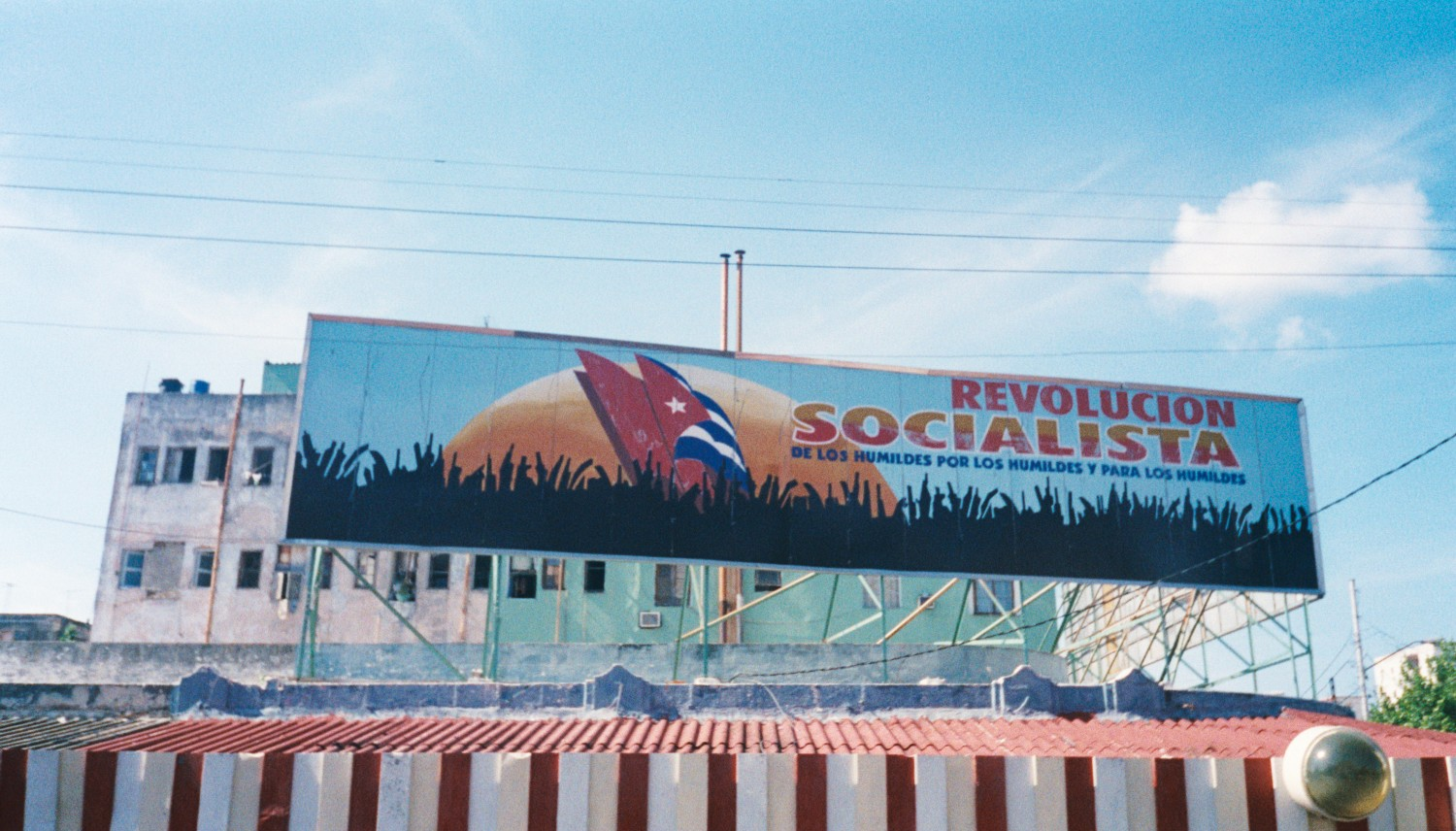
A billboard in Havana that reads "Socialist revolution from the poor, by the poor, and to the poor"

Cuba had a number of communist and socialist organizations from the early period of the Republic (founded in 1902). The original "internationalised" Communist Party of Cuba formed in the 1920s. In 1944, it renamed itself as the Popular Socialist Party for electoral reasons. In July 1961, two years after the successful overthrow of Fulgencio Batista and the creation of a revolutionary government, the Integrated Revolutionary Organizations (ORI) was formed from the merger of:

- Fidel Castro's 26th of July Movement
- The Popular Socialist Party led by Blas Roca
- Parts of the student-based Revolutionary Directory led by Faure Chomón

On 26 March 1962, the ORI became the United Party of the Socialist Revolution of Cuba (PURSC), which in turn became the Communist Party of Cuba on 3 October 1965. In Article 5 of the Cuban constitution of 1976, the Communist Party is recognized as "the superior guiding force of society and of the State, that organizes and orients common efforts toward the high goals of the construction of socialism and the advancement toward communist society". All parties, including the Communist Party, are prohibited from publicly advertising their organizations.

=== Consistent government ===
For the first fifteen years of its formal existence, the Communist Party was almost completely inactive outside of the Politburo. The 100 person Central Committee rarely met and it was ten years after its founding that the first regular party Congress was held. In 1969, membership of the party was only 55,000 or 0.7% of the population, making the PCC the smallest ruling communist party in the world. In the 1970s, the party's apparatus began to develop. By the time of the first party Congress in 1975, the party had grown to just over two hundred thousand members, the Central Committee was meeting regularly and provided the organizational apparatus giving the party the leading role in society that ruling Communist parties generally hold. By 1980, the party had grown to over 430,000 members and it grew further to 520,000 by 1985. Apparatuses of the party had grown to ensure that its leading cadres were appointed to key government positions.

Cubans have been allowed to work for themselves or in privately-owned businesses since 2008.

In 2019 the party enacted a new constitution, which recognized a limited role for the free market, private ownership, and foreign investment as being necessary to growing Cuba's economy while under strict U.S. sanctions. However, the majority of its content remained unchanged.

The Eighth Congress took place from 16 to 19 April 2021, during which Miguel Díaz-Canel was elected as the First Secretary of the Central Committee, taking over from Raúl Castro. José Ramón Machado Ventura was Second Secretary from 2011 to 2021. Abelardo Álvarez Gil also remains Head of the Department of Organization and Staff Policy.

== Organization ==
The PCC governs Cuba as an authoritarian one-party state where dissidence and political opposition are prohibited and repressed.

=== Congresses ===
The Communist Party of Cuba holds congresses every five years, normally in years ending in -6 and -1 (e.g. 2016 and 2021). Exceptions to this pattern are the First Congress (1975), Second Congress (1980) and Fifth Congress (1997). There was also an unusual 14-year gap between the Fifth Congress and Sixth Congress (2011).

=== Central Committee ===
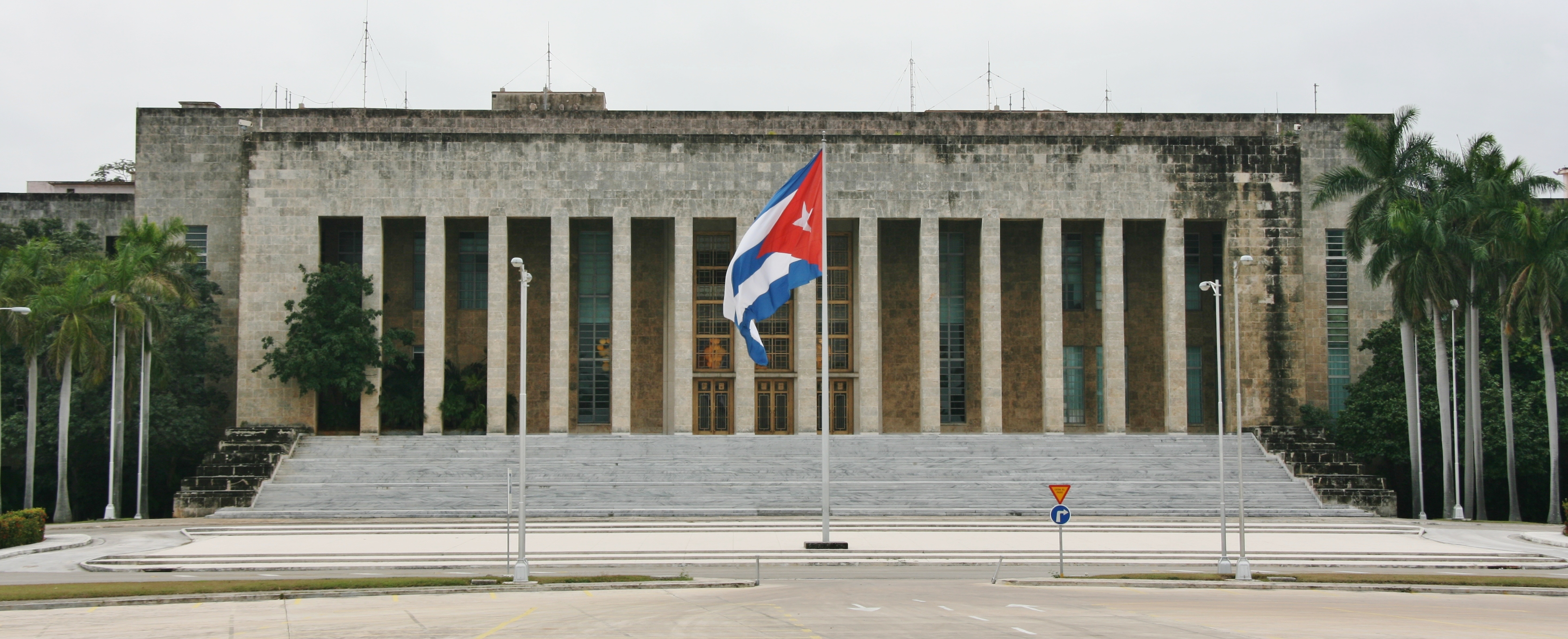
Party headquarters

The leading bodies of the party were the Politburo and the Secretariat until 1991, when the two bodies were merged into an expanded Politburo with over twenty members. However, the Secretariat was re-introduced in 2002. There is also a Central Committee which meets between party congresses. At the Fifth Congress, the size of the Central Committee was reduced to 150 members from the previous membership of 225. Fidel Castro was the party's First Secretary (or leader) since its inception while Raúl Castro was the Second Secretary. Upon Fidel Castro's 2008 resignation from the party and Cuban government, Raúl Castro became First Secretary.

=== Politburo ===
A 14-member Politburo was elected by the 1st Plenary Session of the Central Committee on 19 April 2021 following the 8th Congress.

=== Secretariat ===
A 6-member Secretariat was elected by the 1st Plenary Session of the Central Committee on 19 April 2021 following the 8th Congress.

=== Mass organizations related to the PCC ===
- Young Communist League, (UJC founded in 1962 by Fidel Castro), youth group of future militants of the PCC
- Workers' Central Union of Cuba, (CTC, founded in 1939 by Blas Roca and Lázaro Peña), a Cuban trade union center
- Federation of Cuban Women, (FMC, founded in 1960 by Fidel Castro and Vilma Espín), a centralized women's organization
- National Association of Small Farmers, (ANAP, founded in 1961 by Fidel Castro), a peasant organization
- José Martí Pioneer Organization, (OPJM, founded in 1977 by Fidel Castro), student organization (pioneers)
- Student Federation of Secondary Education, (FEEM, founded in 1970 by Fidel Castro), student organization (pre)
- University Student Federation, (FEU, founded in 1922 by Julio Antonio Mella), student organization (university)
- Committees for the Defense of the Revolution, (CDR, founded in 1960 by Fidel Castro), community work organization
- Association of Combatants of the Cuban Revolution, (ACRC, founded in 1993 by Fidel Castro), organization of active and retired military personnel
- Union of Journalists of Cuba, (UPEC, founded in 1963 by Fidel Castro), a centralized organization of journalists

=== Youth ===
The Communist Party of Cuba has a youth wing, the Young Communist League (Unión de Jóvenes Comunistas, UJC) which is a member organization of the World Federation of Democratic Youth. It also has a children's group, the José Martí Pioneer Organization.

== Ideology ==
The PCC is officially a Marxist–Leninist party that is dedicated to the establishment of a communist society. Since the Cuban Revolution, the party has also followed the doctrines of Castroism (the ideology of Fidel Castro, including inspiration from José Martí) and Guevarism.

=== Economy ===
After the Cuban Revolution, the Party nationalized nearly all private enterprises, establishing a state socialist command economy. Historically, the party has been more reluctant in engaging in market reforms than communist parties leading other Marxist–Leninist states, but it has been pressured to accept some market measures since the dissolution of the Soviet Union and the resultant loss of economic subsidies.

Raúl Castro, after becoming the leader of the party, campaigned to "renew" Cuba's socialist economy through the establishment of a mixed economy based on an expansion of worker-owned cooperatives and small privately-owned businesses, and partial devolution of economic planning to local governments. Some state enterprises have been denationalized and converted into worker co-ops in this process, wherein "[b]usinesses that since 1968 had been run by the government are now being turned over to their former state employees, to be managed by the worker-owners of these businesses."

There has been some speculation that Cuba may ultimately transition towards a model more similar to a China's "socialist market economy" or Vietnam's "socialist-oriented market economy." Private property and foreign direct investment were recognized as legitimate economic activities in the new constitution approved via a popular referendum in 2019, along these lines.

=== Foreign relations ===
The Communist Party of Cuba has often pursued an interventionist foreign policy to aid left-wing revolutionary movements and governments abroad, including the ELN in Colombia, the FMLN in El Salvador, the Sandinistas in Nicaragua, and Maurice Bishop's New Jewel Movement in Grenada. The party's most significant international role was in the civil war in Angola, where Cuba directed a joint Angolan/Soviet/Cuban force in the Battle of Cuito Cuanavale. More recently, the party has sought to support Pink Tide leaders across Latin America, such as Hugo Chávez and Nicolás Maduro in Venezuela and Evo Morales in Bolivia.

Medical diplomacy has also been a prominent feature of the Party's foreign policy. The party maintains a policy of sending thousands of Cuban doctors, agricultural technicians, and other professionals to other countries throughout the developing world. The party also supports Latin American integration.

The Party expresses opposition to US imperialism and the United States embargo against Cuba.

== Electoral history ==
=== National Assembly of People's Power ===
Election	Party leader	Votes		%	Seats	+/–	Position	Result
1976	Fidel Castro	Elected by the Municipal Assemblies			489 / 489	▲489	▲1st	Sole legal party
1981	Fidel Castro	Elected by the Municipal Assemblies			499 / 499	▲10	1st	Sole legal party
1986	Fidel Castro	Elected by the Municipal Assemblies			510 / 510	▲11	1st	Sole legal party
1993	Fidel Castro	Full list	6,939,894	94.67%	589 / 589	▲79	1st	Sole legal party
1993	Fidel Castro	Selective vote	360,735	5.33%	589 / 589	▲79	1st	Sole legal party
1998	Fidel Castro	Full list	7,533,222	100%	601 / 601	▲12	1st	Sole legal party
1998	Fidel Castro	Selective vote	7,533,222	100%	601 / 601	▲12	1st	Sole legal party
2003	Fidel Castro	Full list	7,128,860	91.35%	609 / 609	▲8	1st	Sole legal party
2003	Fidel Castro	Selective vote	675,038	8.65%	609 / 609	▲8	1st	Sole legal party
2008	Fidel Castro	Full list	7,125,752	90.90%	614 / 614	▲5	1st	Sole legal party
2008	Fidel Castro	Selective vote	713,606	9.10%	614 / 614	▲5	1st	Sole legal party
2013	Raúl Castro	Full list	6,031,215	81.30%	612 / 612	▼2	1st	Sole legal party
2013	Raúl Castro	Selective vote	1,387,307	18.70%	612 / 612	▼2	1st	Sole legal party
2018	Raúl Castro	Full list	5,620,713	80.44%	605 / 605	▼7	1st	Sole legal party
2018	Raúl Castro	Selective vote	1,366,328	19.56%	605 / 605	▼7	1st	Sole legal party
2023	Miguel Díaz-Canel	Full list	4,012,864	72.10%	442 / 470	▼135	1st	Sole legal party
2023	Miguel Díaz-Canel	Selective vote	1,552,776	27.90%	442 / 470	▼135	1st	Sole legal party

== See also ==
- GAESA
