= 1998 Cuban parliamentary election =

- 11 January 1998

All 601 seats in the National Assembly of People's Power
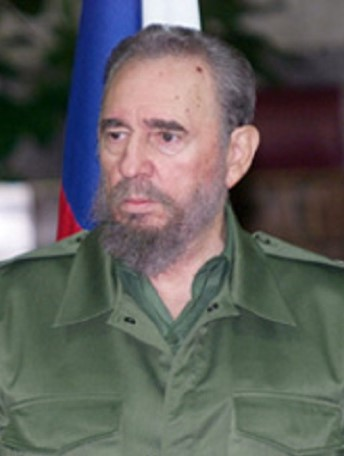
	First party
Leader	Fidel Castro
Party	PCC
Seats won	601
Seat change	▲12
President of the Council of Ministers before election
Fidel Castro
PCC
Elected President of the Council of Ministers
Fidel Castro
PCC

Parliamentary elections were held in Cuba on 11 January 1998 alongside elections to the fourteen Provincial Assemblies. A list of 601 candidates for the 601 seats was provided by the National Candidature Commission. Voter turnout was reported to be 98.35%.

== Results ==
Party	Votes	%	Seats
Entire list			601
Selective votes			601
Total			601
Valid votes	7,533,222	94.98	
Invalid/blank votes	398,007	5.02	
Total votes	7,931,229	100.00	
Registered voters/turnout	8,064,205	98.35	
Source: IPU
