= Andrés Rivero Agüero =

Cuban politician (1905–1997)

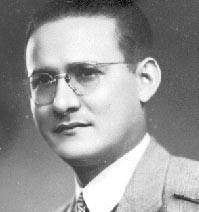

11th Prime Minister of Cuba
- In office 26 March 1957 – 6 March 1958
- President: Fulgencio Batista
- Preceded by: Jorge García Montes
- Succeeded by: Emilio Núñez Portuondo

President-elect of Cuba (disputed)
- In office 3 November 1958 – 1 January 1959 (never took office)
- Succeeded by: Manuel Urrutia Lleó

Cuban Senator from Pinar del Río
- In office 28 January 1955 – 5 January 1959

Personal details
- Born: 4 February 1905 San Luis, Oriente Province, Cuba
- Died: 11 November 1997 (aged 92) Miami, Florida, U.S.
- Party: Progressive Action Party
- Education: University of Havana
- Occupation: Lawyer, politician

Andrés Rivero Agüero (4 February 1905 – 11 November 1997) was a Cuban politician who served as the 12th Prime Minister of Cuba and was elected president of Cuba in the 1958 Cuban presidential election. However, he would never take office due to the Cuban Revolution of 1959.

== Early life and education ==
Rivero was born to extremely poor parents in San Luis, Oriente Province (now Santiago de Cuba Province) on 4 February 1905. He taught himself to read when he was 15. Rivero managed to secure a high school education by his own efforts, and obtained a law degree from Havana University (1934).

== Political career ==
Elected a city councilman in Santiago de Cuba, he quickly became a leader of the Liberal Party, and was befriended by Fulgencio Batista. During Batista's first administration (1940–1944), Rivero served as Minister of Agriculture, and implemented Batista's plan for resettling landless peasants in Oriente Province.

During General Batista's exile in the United States from 1944–1952, Rivero practised law in Cuba and wrote political commentary for several periodicals. When Batista returned to run for President of Cuba in 1952, Rivero helped to organise Batista's United Action Party. He supported Batista's military coup on 10 March 1952, and thereafter served as Minister of Education (1952-1955) in Batista's second administration (1952–1959). Elected a Senator from Pinar del Río Province in 1954, Rivero became Cuba's prime minister (1957–1958), and participated in several reconciliation conferences as Batista's representative.

Rivero resigned his premiership in 1958 to run for President of Cuba. He received the support of Batista's Progressive Action Party, and three other pro-government parties. Rivero won the elections. After the election, Rivero entered into conversations with U.S. Ambassador Earl E. T. Smith, and with leading Cuban politicians, to resolve the crisis caused by the insurgency led by Fidel Castro. He apparently wished to convene a Constituent Assembly shortly after taking office, to bring about a restoration of constitutional rule. However, Fulgencio Batista was overthrown on 1 January 1959 as a result of the Cuban Revolution, and therefore Rivero was unable to take office as president, and both fled into exile in the Dominican Republic on 1 January 1959.

== Later life ==
Rivero eventually settled in the United States, living in extremely modest circumstances. He lived to be a great-grandfather. Rivero died in Miami, Florida on 11 November 1997.
