= 1993 Cuban parliamentary election =

- 24 February 1993

All 589 seats in the National Assembly of People's Power
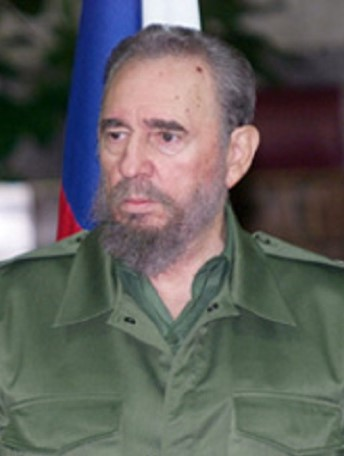
	First party
Leader	Fidel Castro
Party	PCC
Seats won	589
Seat change	▲79
President of the Council of Ministers before election
Fidel Castro
PCC
Elected President of the Council of Ministers
Fidel Castro
PCC

Parliamentary elections were held in Cuba on 24 February 1993 alongside elections to the fourteen Provincial Assemblies. Following the implementation of a new electoral law in 1992, voters now elected the National Assembly directly. Previously voters had elected members of the country's 169 municipal assemblies, who in turn had elected the National Assembly.

More than 60,000 people applied to be candidates, with the National Candidature Commission eventually selecting a list of 589 candidates. Voters could vote for the entire list or selected candidates. All 589 candidates received the 50% of votes required for election.

Voter turnout was reported to be 99.57%.

== Results ==
Party	Votes	%	Seats
Communist Party of Cuba and affiliated (entire list)	6,939,894	95.06	589
Communist Party of Cuba and affiliated (selective votes)	360,735	4.94	589
Total	7,300,629	100.00	589
Valid votes	7,300,629	92.97	
Invalid/blank votes	551,686	7.03	
Total votes	7,852,315	100.00	
Registered voters/turnout	7,886,039	99.57	
Source: IPU
