= 1986 Cuban parliamentary election =

- 27 November 1986

All 510 seats in the National Assembly of People's Power Indirectly elected by municipal assemblies
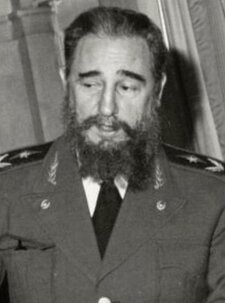
| | First party |
|---|---|
| Leader | Fidel Castro |
| Party | PCC |
| Seats won | 510 |
| Seat change | ▲11 |
President of the Council of Ministers before election
Fidel Castro
PCC
Elected President of the Council of Ministers
Fidel Castro
PCC

Indirect parliamentary elections were held in Cuba on 27 November 1986.

On 19 and 26 October voters elected members of the 169 municipal assemblies. A total of 6,704,479 votes were cast in the first round (19 October), a turnout of 97.65%. In the second round (26 October) turnout was 93.4%. The elected members of the Municipal Assemblies then elected the 510 members of the National Assembly.
