= Fulgencio Batista =

Leader of Cuba (1934–1944; 1952–1954; 1955–1959)

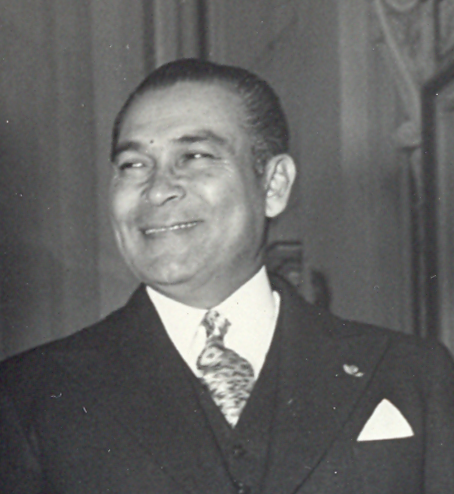
- Batista in 1955

President of Cuba
- In office 24 February 1955 – 1 January 1959
- Prime Minister: Jorge García Montes; Andrés Rivero Agüero; Emilio Núñez Portuondo; Gonzalo Güell
- Vice President: Rafael Guas Inclán (1955‍–‍1958)
- Preceded by: Andrés Domingo (acting)
- Succeeded by: Carlos Manuel Piedra
- In office 10 March 1952 – 14 August 1954
- Prime Minister: Himself; Vacant
- Vice President: Vacant
- Preceded by: Carlos Prío Socarrás
- Succeeded by: Andrés Domingo (acting)
- In office 10 October 1940 – 10 October 1944
- Prime Minister: Carlos Saladrigas Zayas; Ramón Zaydín; Anselmo Alliegro
- Vice President: Gustavo Cuervo Rubio
- Preceded by: Federico Laredo Brú
- Succeeded by: Ramón Grau

Prime Minister of Cuba
- In office 10 March 1952 – 4 April 1952
- President: Himself
- Preceded by: Óscar Gans
- Succeeded by: Vacant (Jorge García Montes in 1955)

Member of the Senate
- In office 2 June 1948 – 10 March 1952
- Constituency: Las Villas

Personal details
- Born: Rubén Zaldívar; 16 January 1901 Banes, Oriente, Cuba
- Died: 6 August 1973 (aged 72) Marbella, Andalusia, Spain
- Resting place: Saint Isidore Cemetery
- Party: CSD (1939–1944); Liberal (1948–1949); PAU (1949–1952); PAP (1952–1959)
- Other political affiliations: ABC (1931–1933)
- Spouses: Elisa Godínez Gómez (m. 1926; div. 1945); Marta Fernández Miranda (m. 1945)
- Children: 9
- Other name: Fulgencio Batista y Zaldívar (full name from 1939)
- Nickname(s): El Hombre, El General, El Indio, Mulato Lindo, Kuqui, Beno, El Mexicano

Military service
- Allegiance: Republic of Cuba
- Branch/service: Cuban Army
- Years of service: 1921–1959
- Rank: Major general
- Battles/wars: Cuban Revolution

Fulgencio Batista y Zaldívar (Note: In this name that follows Hispanic American naming customs, the first or paternal surname is Batista and the second or maternal family name is Zaldívar.) (Note: English: /fʊlˈhɛnsioʊ bəˈtiːstə/ fuul-HEN-see-oh bə-TEE-stə, Latin American Spanish: [fulˈxensjo βaˈtista j salˈdiβaɾ].) (born Rubén Zaldívar; 16 January 1901 – 6 August 1973) was a Cuban military officer and politician who served as president of Cuba from 1940 to 1944, from 1952 to 1954 and again from 1955 to his resignation in 1959, when he was overthrown in the Cuban Revolution. From 1934 till 1940 he was the de facto leader of Cuba.

Batista first came to prominence in the Revolt of the Sergeants, which overthrew the provisional government of Carlos Manuel de Céspedes y Quesada. Batista then appointed himself chief of the armed forces, with the rank of colonel, and effectively controlled the five-member "pentarchy" that functioned as the collective head of state. He maintained control through a series of puppet presidents until 1940, when he was elected president on a populist platform. He then instated the 1940 Constitution of Cuba and presided over Cuban support for the Allies during World War II. After finishing his term in 1944, Batista moved to Florida, returning to Cuba to run for president in 1952. Facing certain electoral defeat, he led a military coup against President Carlos Prío Socarrás that pre-empted the election.

Back in power and receiving financial, military and logistical support from the United States government, Batista suspended the 1940 Constitution and revoked most political liberties, including the right to strike. He then aligned with the wealthiest landowners who owned the largest sugar plantations, and presided over a stagnating economy that widened the gap between rich and poor Cubans. Eventually, it reached the point where most of the sugar industry was in U.S. hands, and foreigners owned 70% of the arable land. Batista's repressive government then began to systematically profit from the exploitation of Cuba's commercial interests, by negotiating lucrative relationships both with the American Mafia, who controlled the drug, gambling, and prostitution businesses in Havana, and with large U.S.-based multinational companies who were awarded lucrative contracts.

To quell the growing discontent amongst the populace—which was subsequently displayed through frequent student riots and demonstrations—Batista established tighter censorship of the media, while also utilizing his Bureau for the Repression of Communist Activities secret police to carry out wide-scale violence, torture and public executions. These murders mounted in 1957, as socialist ideas became more influential. While exact numbers are unclear, estimates of the death toll attributed to Batista range from hundreds to up to 20,000 victims.

Batista's efforts to quell the unrest proved not only ineffective, but his tactics were the catalyst to even wider resistance against his regime. During this time, revolutionary leaders Fidel Castro and Che Guevara, founders of the 26th of July Movement, began a revolution that saw a combination of peaceful protests and guerrilla warfare in both rural and urban areas of Cuba between 1956 and 1958. After almost two years of fighting, rebel forces led by Guevara defeated Batista's forces at the Battle of Santa Clara on New Year's Eve, 1958, effectively collapsing the regime. On 1 January 1959, Batista announced his resignation, fleeing the country to the Dominican Republic under the protection of Rafael Trujillo, before settling in Portugal, spending the rest of his life in exile until his death in 1973.

== Early life ==
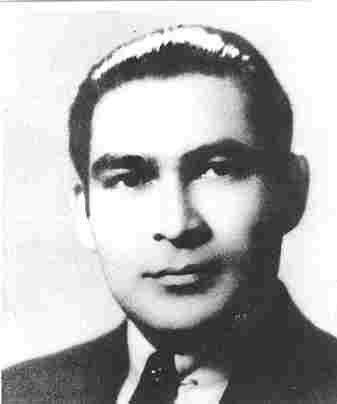
Batista in 1928

Batista was born in the town of Veguita in the municipality of Banes, Cuba, in 1901 to Belisario Batista Palermo and Carmela Zaldívar González, who had fought in the Cuban War of Independence. He was of Spanish, African, Chinese, and possibly some Taíno descent. Both Batista's parents are believed to have been of mixed race and one may have had Indigenous Caribbean blood. His mother named him Rubén and gave him her last name, Zaldívar. His father did not want to register him as a Batista. In the registration records of the Banes courthouse, he was legally Rubén Zaldívar until 1939, when he tried to register as a presidential candidate under the name Fulgencio Batista. When it was discovered that no birth certificate existed for a "Fulgencio Batista", he had to postpone his candidacy registration and pay 15,000 pesos to the local judge.

Batista was initially educated at a public school in Banes and later attended night classes at an American Quaker school. He left home at age 14, after the death of his mother. Coming from a humble background, he earned a living as a laborer in the cane fields, docks, and railroads. He was a tailor, mechanic, charcoal vendor and fruit peddler. In 1921, he traveled to Havana, and in April joined the army as a private. After learning shorthand and typing, Batista left the army in 1923, working briefly as a teacher of stenography before enlisting in the Guardia Rural (rural police). He transferred back to the army as a corporal, becoming secretary to a regimental colonel. In September 1933, he held the rank of sergeant stenographer and as such acted as the secretary of a group of non-commissioned officers who led a "sergeants' conspiracy" for better conditions and improved prospects of promotion.

== 1933 coup ==
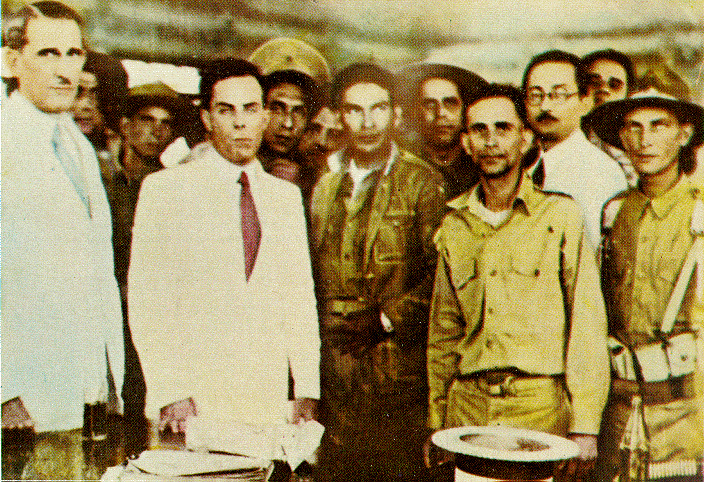
Sergeant Batista (third from left, in a uniform) with other leaders of the Sergeants' Revolt: Dr. Ramón Grau and Sergio Carbó

Batista in 1938

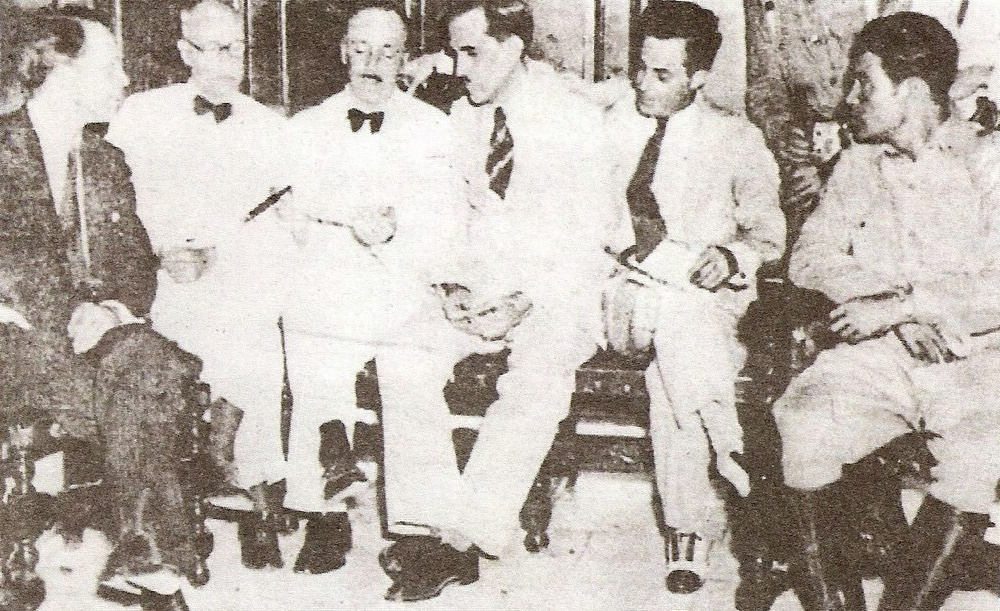
The Pentarchy of 1933 was a five-man presidency of Cuba, including José M. Irisari, Porfirio Franca, Guillermo Portela, Ramón Grau, and Sergio Carbó. Batista (on the far right) controlled the armed forces.

In 1933, Batista led an uprising called the Sergeants' Revolt, as part of the coup that overthrew the government of Gerardo Machado. Machado was succeeded by Carlos Manuel de Céspedes y Quesada, who lacked a political coalition that could sustain him and was soon replaced.

Batista was not originally the leader of the movement. His contemporaries have claimed that he was called to join the conspiracy mainly because he was the only sergeant who had a car.

A short-lived five-member presidency, known as the Pentarchy of 1933, was established. The Pentarchy included a representative from each anti-Machado faction. Batista was not a member, but controlled Cuba's armed forces. Within days, the representative for the students and professors of the University of Havana, Ramón Grau San Martín, was made president—and Batista became the Army Chief of Staff, with the rank of colonel, effectively putting him in control of the presidency. The majority of the commissioned officer corps were forced to retire or, some speculate, were killed.

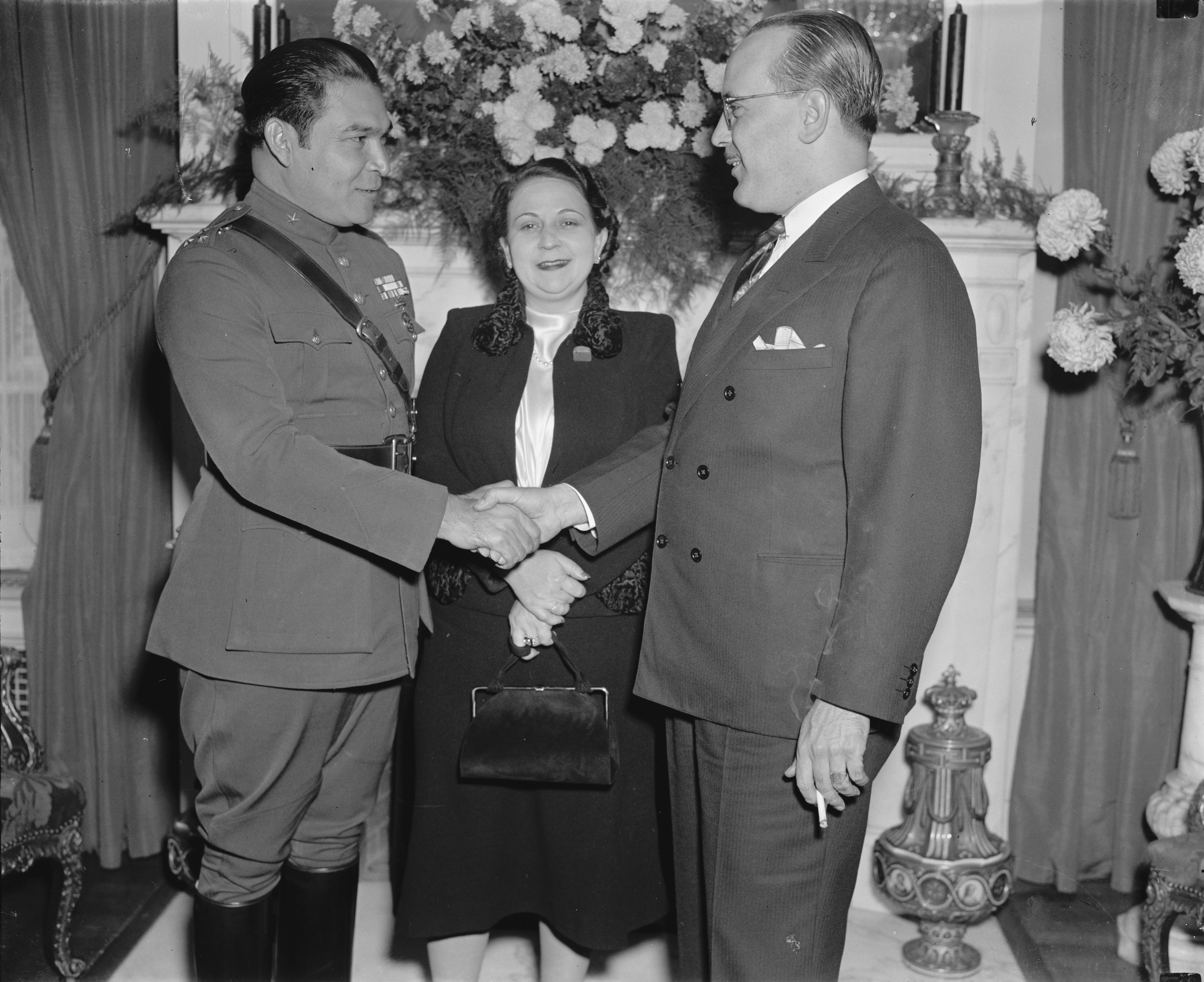
Batista (left) with his first wife Elisa Godinez-Gómez on a 1938 visit to Washington, D.C., greeting the Cuban ambassador, Pedro Fraga

Grau remained president for just over 100 days before Batista, conspiring with the U.S. envoy Sumner Welles, forced him to resign in January 1934. Grau was replaced by Carlos Mendieta, and within five days the U.S. recognized Cuba's new government, which lasted eleven months. Batista then became the strongman behind a succession of puppet presidents until he was elected president in 1940. After Mendieta, succeeding governments were led by José Agripino Barnet (five months) and Miguel Mariano Gómez (seven months) before Federico Laredo Brú ruled from December 1936 to October 1940.

== Constitutional presidency (1940–1944) ==
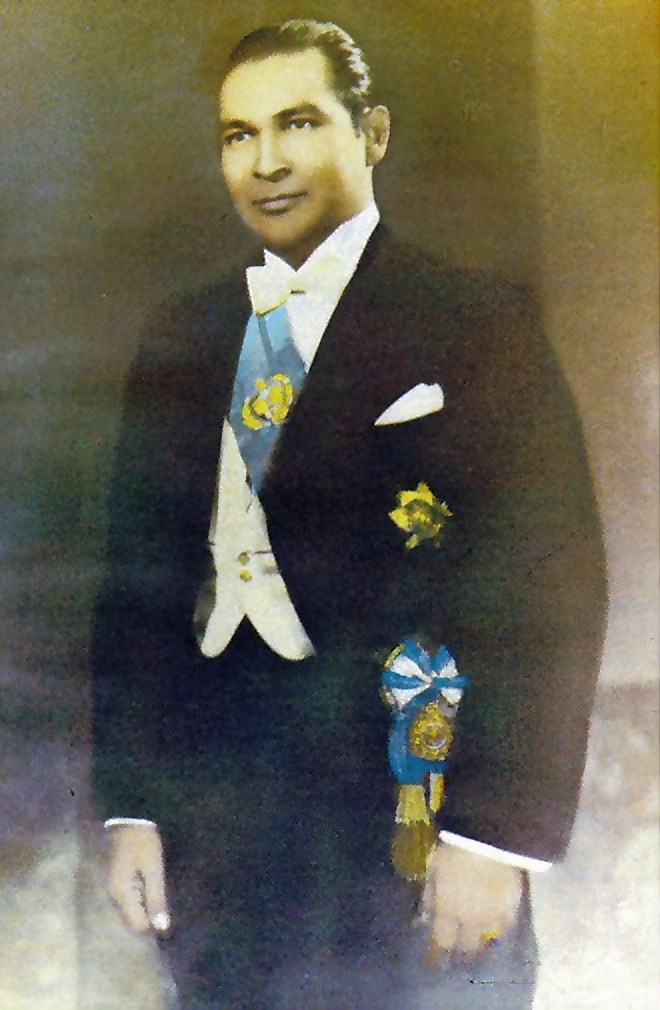
Batista after being elected President of Cuba for the first time, 1940

Batista defeated Grau in the first presidential election (1940) under the new Cuban constitution, and served a four-year term as President of Cuba, the first and to this day only non-white Cuban in that office. Batista was endorsed by the Democratic Socialist Coalition and the original Cuban Communist Party (later known as the Popular Socialist Party), which at the time had little significance and no probability of an electoral victory. Batista also supported corporatism and statism in his first term. During this term in office, Batista carried out major social reforms and established numerous economic regulations and pro-union policies.

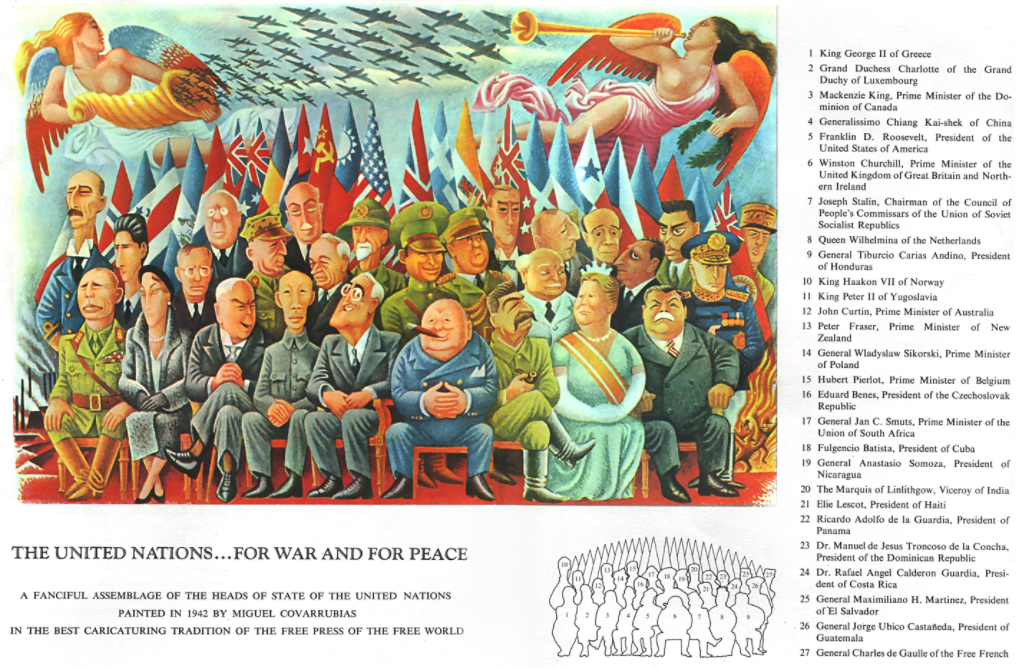
1942 political cartoon of the United Nations. President Batista ninth from the left in a military uniform

Cuba entered World War II on the side of the Allies on December 9, 1941, declaring war on Japan two days after the attack on Pearl Harbor. On December 11, the Batista government declared war on Germany and Italy. In December 1942, after a friendly visit to Washington, Batista said Latin America would applaud if the Declaration by United Nations called for war with Francisco Franco's Spain, calling the regime fascist.

== Between presidencies (1944–1952) ==
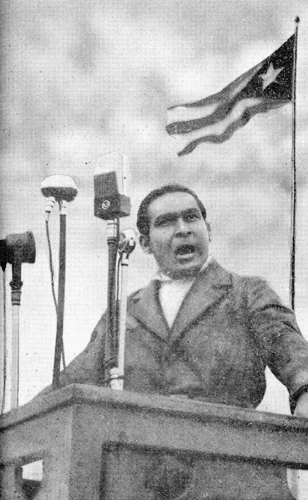
Batista in 1950

In 1944, Batista's handpicked successor, Carlos Saladrigas Zayas, was defeated by Grau. In the final months of his presidency, Batista sought to handicap the incoming Grau administration. In a July 17, 1944, dispatch to the U.S. Secretary of State, U.S. Ambassador Spruille Braden wrote:

It is becoming increasingly apparent that President Batista intends to discomfit the incoming Administration in every way possible, particularly financially. A systematic raid on the Treasury is in full swing with the result that Dr. Grau will probably find empty coffers when he takes office on October 10. It is blatant that President Batista desires that Dr. Grau San Martin should assume obligations which in fairness and equity should be a matter of settlement by the present Administration.

Shortly after, Batista left Cuba for the United States. "I just felt safer there," he said. He divorced his wife, Elisa Godínez, and married Marta Fernández in 1945. Two of their four children were born in the United States. For the next eight years, Batista remained in the background, spending time in the Waldorf-Astoria in New York City and a home in Daytona Beach, Florida.

Batista continued to participate in Cuban politics and was elected to the Cuban Senate in absentia in 1948. Returning to Cuba, he decided to run for president and received permission from President Grau, whereupon he formed the United Action Party. On taking power he founded the Progressive Action Party, but he never regained his former popular support, though the unions supported him until the end.

== Military coup and dictatorship (1952–1959) ==
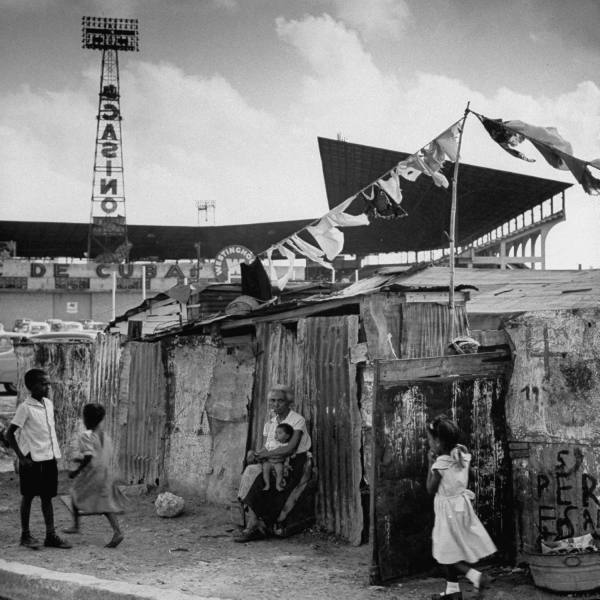
Slum (bohio) dwellings in Havana, Cuba, in 1954, just outside Havana baseball stadium. In the background is advertising for a nearby casino.

In 1952, Batista again ran for president. In a three-way race, Roberto Agramonte of the Orthodox Party led in all the polls, followed by Carlos Hevia of the Authentic Party. Batista's United Action coalition was running a distant third.

On March 10, 1952, three months before the elections, Batista, with army backing, staged a coup and seized power. He ousted outgoing President Carlos Prío Socarrás, canceled the elections and took control of the government as a provisional president. The United States recognized his government on March 27. When asked by the U.S. government to analyze Batista's Cuba, Arthur M. Schlesinger, Jr. said:

The corruption of the Government, the brutality of the police, the government's indifference to the needs of the people for education, medical care, housing, for social justice and economic justice ... is an open invitation to revolution.

=== Economy of Cuba ===
Upon his seizure of power, Batista inherited a country that was relatively prosperous for Latin America. According to Batista's government, although a third of Cubans still lived in poverty, Cuba was one of the five most developed countries in the region. In the 1950s, Cuba's gross domestic product (GDP) per capita was roughly equal to that of Italy at the time, although still only a sixth of that of the United States. Moreover, although corruption and inequality were rife under Batista, Cuban industrial workers' wages rose significantly. In 1953, the average Cuban family only had an income of $6.00 a week, 15% to 20% of the labor force was chronically unemployed, and only a third of the homes had running water. Despite this, according to the International Labour Organization, the average industrial salary in Cuba became the world's eighth-highest in 1958, and the average agricultural wage was higher than some European nations (although, according to one sample from 1956 to 1957, agricultural workers could only find employment for an average of 123 days per year while farm owners, rural tenants and sharecroppers worked an average of only 135 days per year). Not like in his first term, where he advocated for Corporatism, he began to advocate for Economic liberalism.

=== Relationship with organized crime ===
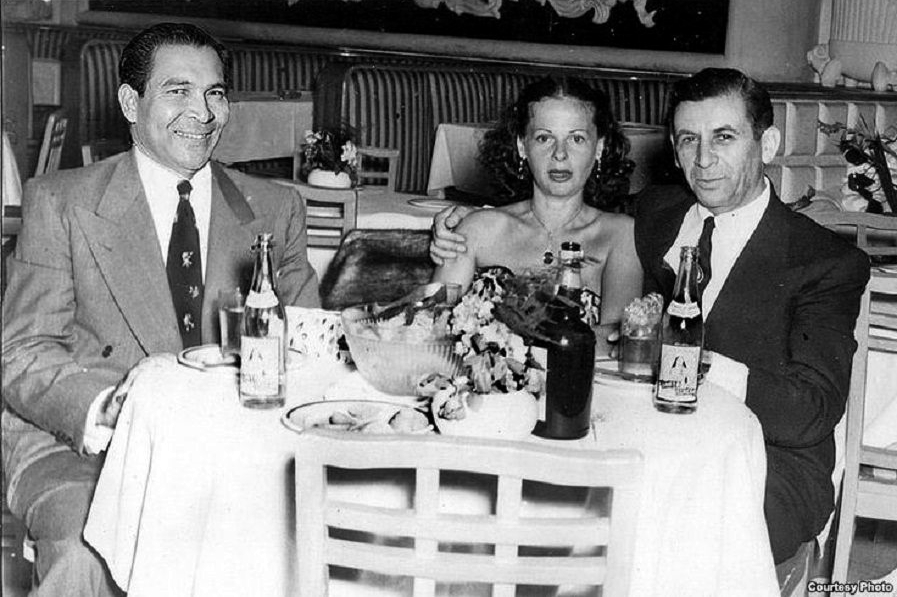
Batista with Thelma Schwartz and Meyer Lansky, around 1948

Brothels flourished. A major industry grew up around them; government officials received bribes, policemen collected protection money. Prostitutes could be seen standing in doorways, strolling the streets, or leaning from windows. One report estimated that 11,500 of them worked their trade in Havana. Beyond the outskirts of the capital, beyond the slot machines, was one of the poorest, and most beautiful countries in the Western world.

— David Detzer, American journalist, after visiting Havana in the 1950s.

Throughout the 1950s, Havana served as "a hedonistic playground for the world's elite", producing sizable gambling, prostitution and drug profits for the American mafia, corrupt law-enforcement officials, and their politically elected cronies. In the assessment of the Cuban-American historian Louis Perez, "Havana was then what Las Vegas has become." Relatedly, it is estimated that by the end of the 1950s the city of Havana had 270 brothels. In addition, drugs, be it marijuana or cocaine, were so plentiful at the time that one American magazine in 1950 proclaimed "Narcotics are hardly more difficult to obtain in Cuba than a shot of rum. And only slightly more expensive." As a result, the playwright Arthur Miller described Batista's Cuba in The Nation as "hopelessly corrupt, a Mafia playground, (and) a bordello for Americans and other foreigners."

In a bid to profit from such an environment, Batista established lasting relationships with organized crime, notably with American mobsters Meyer Lansky and Lucky Luciano, and under his rule Havana became known as "the Latin Las Vegas". Batista and Lansky formed a friendship and business relationship that flourished for a decade. During a stay at the Waldorf-Astoria in New York in the late 1940s, it was mutually agreed that, in return for kickbacks, Batista would give Lansky and the Mafia control of Havana's racetracks and casinos. After World War II, Luciano was paroled from prison on the condition that he permanently return to Sicily. Luciano secretly moved to Cuba, where he worked to resume control over American Mafia operations. Luciano also ran a number of casinos in Cuba with the sanction of Batista, though the American government eventually succeeded in pressuring the Batista government to deport him.

Batista encouraged large-scale gambling in Havana. In 1955, he announced that Cuba would grant a gaming license to anyone who invested US$1 million in a hotel or $200,000 in a new nightclub—and that the government would provide matching public funds for construction, a 10-year tax exemption, and waive duties on imported equipment and furnishings for new hotels. Each casino would pay the government $250,000 for the license, plus a percentage of the profits. The policy omitted background checks, as required for casino operations in the United States, which opened the door for casino investors with illegally obtained funds. Cuban contractors with the right connections made windfalls by importing, duty-free, more materials than needed for new hotels and selling the surplus to others. It was rumored that, besides the $250,000 to obtain a license, an additional "under the table" fee was sometimes required.

Lansky became a prominent figure in Cuba's gambling operations, and exerted influence over Batista's casino policies. The Mafia's Havana Conference was held on December 22, 1946, at the Hotel Nacional de Cuba; this was the first full-scale meeting of American underworld leaders since the Chicago meeting in 1932. Lansky set about cleaning up the games at the Montmartre Club, which soon became the "place to be" in Havana. He also wanted to open a casino in the Hotel Nacional, the most elegant hotel in Havana. Batista endorsed Lansky's idea over the objections of American expatriates such as Ernest Hemingway, and the renovated casino wing opened for business in 1955 with a show by Eartha Kitt. The casino was an immediate success.

As the new hotels, nightclubs, and casinos opened, Batista collected his share of the profits. Nightly, the "bagman" for his wife collected 10% of the profits at Santo Trafficante's casinos, the Sans Souci cabaret, and the casinos in the hotels Sevilla-Biltmore, Commodoro, Deauville, and Capri (partly owned by the actor George Raft). His take from the Lansky casinos—his prized Habana Riviera, the Hotel Nacional, the Montmartre Club, and others—was said to be 30%. Lansky was said to have personally contributed millions of dollars per year to Batista's Swiss bank accounts.

=== Support of U.S. business and government ===
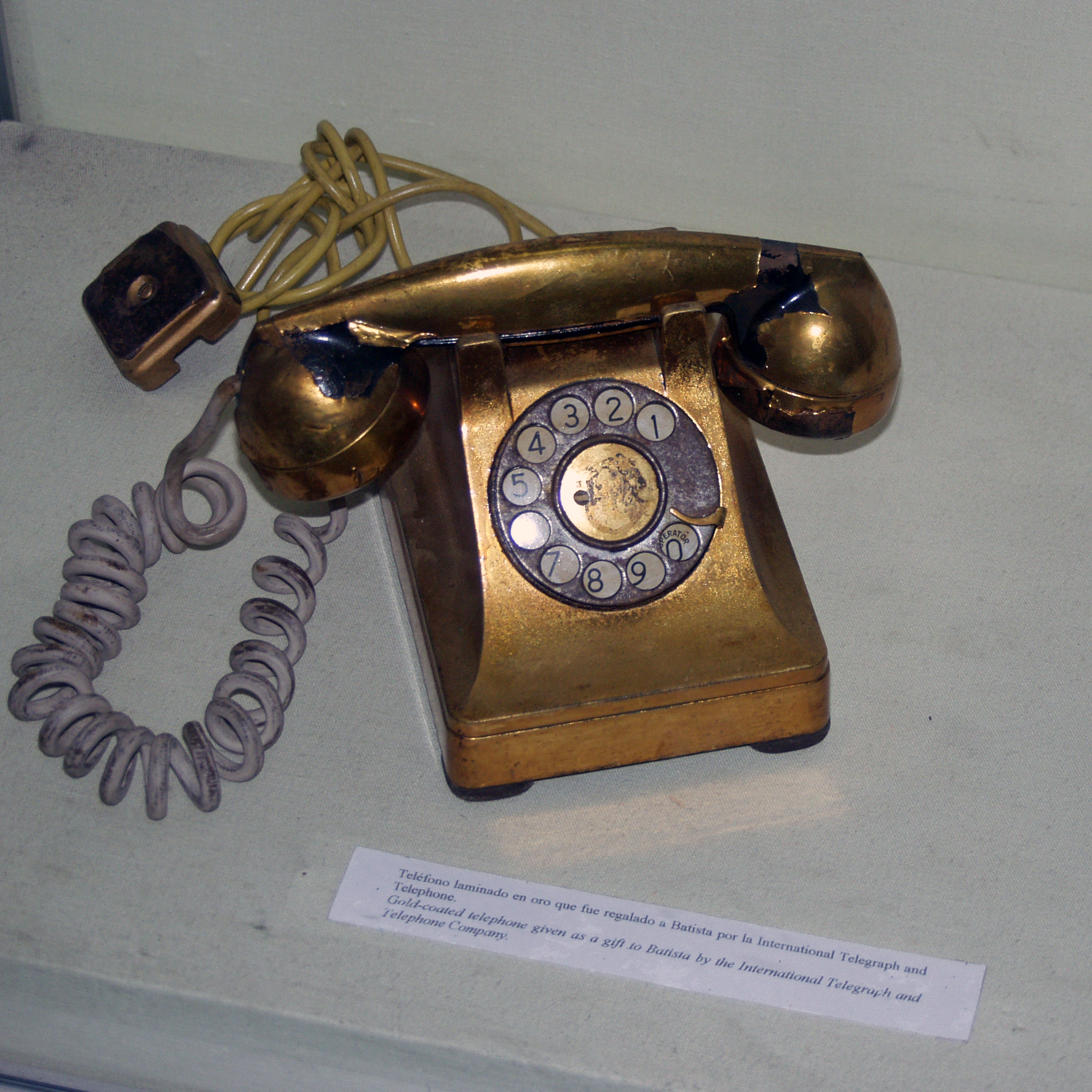
Batista's Golden Telephone is now in Havana's Museum of the Revolution as a symbol of Batista era corruption.

At the beginning of 1959 United States companies owned about 40 percent of the Cuban sugar lands—almost all the cattle ranches—90 percent of the mines and mineral concessions—80 percent of the utilities—practically all the oil industry—and supplied two-thirds of Cuba's imports.

— John F. Kennedy

In a manner that antagonized the Cuban people, the U.S. government used its influence to advance the interests of and increase the profits of the private American companies, which "dominated the island's economy". By the late 1950s, U.S. financial interests owned 90% of Cuban mines, 80% of its public utilities, 50% of its railways, 40% of its sugar production and 25% of its bank deposits—some $1 billion in total. U.S. financial interests in the region were aided by Batista's announcement of a decree in September 1958 which allowed U.S. corporations to control "all transactions originating or consummated outside of Cuba without being subject to Cuban taxes" by setting up a central office in the country. According to historian Louis A. Pérez Jr., author of the book On Becoming Cuban, "Daily life had developed into a relentless degradation, with the complicity of political leaders and public officials who operated at the behest of American interests."

By 1957, U.S. private investments made since the military coup totaled in excess of $350 million, aided by a series of measures introduced by Batista meant to encourage foreign investment through tax and customs duty exemptions in a mutually beneficial deal, wherein U.S. companies were able to hold monopolies in public utilities and consumer goods in exchange for financial aid and rebuilding of infrastructure. As a symbol of this relationship, ITT Corporation, an American-owned multinational telephone company, presented Batista with a Gold Plated Telephone, as an "expression of gratitude" for the "excessive telephone rate increase", at least according to Senator John F. Kennedy, that Batista granted at the urging of the U.S. government.

Earl E.T. Smith, former U.S. Ambassador to Cuba, testified to the U.S. Senate in 1960 that, "Until Castro, the U.S. was so overwhelmingly influential in Cuba that the American ambassador was the second most important man, sometimes even more important than the Cuban president." In addition, nearly "all aid" from the U.S. to Batista's government was in the "form of weapons assistance", which "merely strengthened the Batista dictatorship" and "completely failed to advance the economic welfare of the Cuban people". The U.S. Department of Defense provided equipment and arms valued over $16 million and organized officer training for over 500 Cuban officers during the Batista period. Such actions later "enabled Castro and the Communists to encourage the growing belief that America was indifferent to Cuban aspirations for a decent life."

According to historian and author James S. Olson, the U.S. government essentially became a "co-conspirator" in the arrangement because of Batista's strong opposition to communism, which, in the rhetoric of the Cold War, seemed to maintain business stability and a pro-U.S. posture on the island. Thus, in the view of Olson, "The U.S. government had no difficulty in dealing with him, even if he was a hopeless despot." On October 6, 1960, Senator John F. Kennedy, in the midst of his campaign for the U.S. presidency, decried Batista's relationship with the U.S. government and criticized the Eisenhower administration for supporting him. The Eisenhower administration's expenses on military aid for Batista's regime increased from $400,000 in 1953 to $3 million by 1958. The U.S. subsequently suspended the shipment of combat arms to the Cuban government in March 1958, with the Acting Secretary of State Christian A. Herter asserting that "in our best judgment, we could not continue to supply weapons to a government which was resorting to such repressive measures of internal security as to have alienated some 80 percent of the Cuban people."

"I loved Havana and was horrified by the way this lovely city had unfortunately been transformed into a huge casino and brothel for American businessmen […]. My fellow countrymen walked the streets, picked up fourteen-year-old Cuban girls and threw coins just for the pleasure of watching men roll around in the sewers and picking them up. One wondered how Cubans – seeing this reality – could regard the United States in any other way than with hatred."

— Arthur Meier Schlesinger, personal advisor to President Kennedy

=== Batista, Fidel Castro and the Cuban Revolution ===
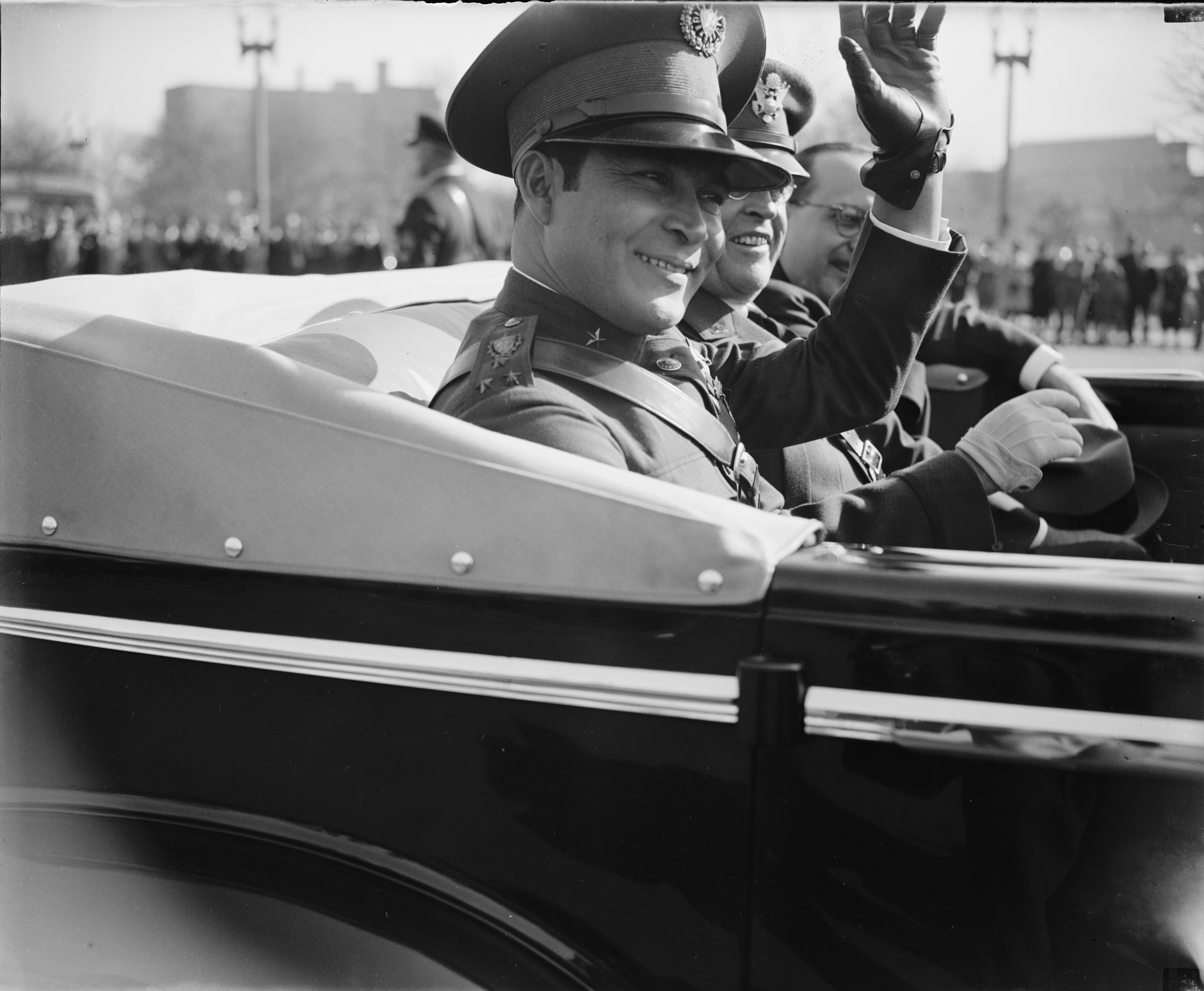
Batista with U.S. Army Chief of staff Malin Craig in Washington, D.C., riding in an Armistice Day parade, 1938

I believe that there is no country in the world including any and all the countries under colonial domination, where economic colonization, humiliation and exploitation were worse than in Cuba, in part owing to my country's policies during the Batista regime. I approved the proclamation which Fidel Castro made in the Sierra Maestra, when he justifiably called for justice and especially yearned to rid Cuba of corruption. I will even go further: to some extent it is as though Batista was the incarnation of a number of sins on the part of the United States. Now we shall have to pay for those sins. In the matter of the Batista regime, I am in agreement with the first Cuban revolutionaries. That is perfectly clear.

— U.S. President John F. Kennedy, to Jean Daniel, October 24, 1963.

On July 26, 1953, just over a year after Batista's second coup, a small group of revolutionaries attacked the Moncada Barracks in Santiago. Government forces easily defeated the assault and jailed its leaders, while many others fled the country. The primary leader of the attack, Fidel Castro, was a young attorney who had run for parliament in the canceled 1952 elections. Although Castro was never officially nominated, he felt that Batista's coup had sidetracked what would have been a promising political career for him. In the wake of the Moncada assault, Batista suspended constitutional guarantees and increasingly relied on police tactics in an attempt to "frighten the population through open displays of brutality."

Batista held an election in 1954, running as the candidate of a political coalition that included the Progressive Action Party, the Radical Union Party and the Liberal Party. The opposition divided into abstentionists and electoralists. The abstentionists favored boycotting the elections regardless of the circumstances in which they were held, whereas the electoralists sought certain rights and guarantees to participate. The CIA had predicted that Batista would use any means necessary to ensure he won the election. Batista lived up to their expectations, utilizing fraud and intimidation to secure his presidency. This led most of the other parties to boycott the elections. Former President Ramón Grau San Martín, leading the electoralist factions of the Cuban Revolutionary Party, participated through the political campaign but withdrew from the campaign days before election day, charging that his supporters had been terrorized. Thus Batista was elected president with the support of 45.6% of registered voters. Despite the boycott, Grau received the support of 6.8% of those who voted. The remaining voters abstained.

By late 1955, student riots and anti-Batista demonstrations had become frequent, and unemployment became a problem as graduates entering the workforce could not find jobs. These were dealt with through increasing repression. All youth were seen as suspected revolutionaries. Due to its continued opposition to Batista and the large amount of revolutionary activity taking place on its campus, the University of Havana was temporarily closed on November 30, 1956 (it did not reopen until 1959 under the first revolutionary government). On March 13, 1957, student leader José Antonio Echeverría was killed by police outside Radio Reloj in Havana after announcing that Batista had been killed in a student attack on the Presidential Palace. In reality, Batista survived, and the students of the Federation of University Students (FEU) and the Directorio Revolucionario (DR) who led the attack were killed in the response by the military and police. Castro quickly condemned the attack, since July 26 Movement had not participated in it.

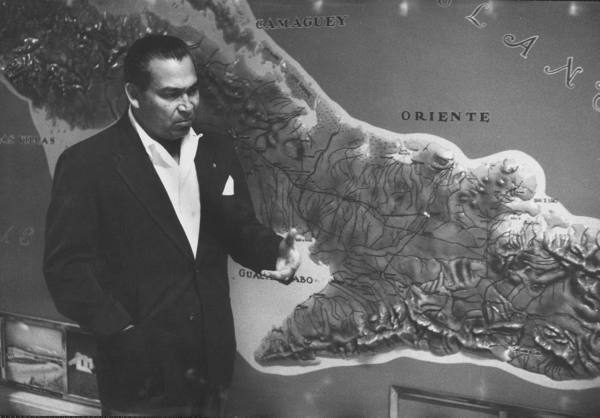
Batista in March 1957, standing next to a map of the Sierra Maestra mountains where Fidel Castro's rebels were based

In April 1956, Batista called popular military leader Col. Ramón Barquín back to Cuba from his post as military attaché to the United States. Believing Barquín would support his rule, Batista promoted him to General. However, Barquín's Conspiración de los Puros (Conspiracy of the Pure) was already underway and had already progressed too far. On April 6, 1956, Barquín led hundreds of career officers in a coup attempt, but was frustrated by Lieutenant Ríos Morejón, who betrayed the plan. Barquín was sentenced to solitary confinement for eight years on the Isle of Pines, while some officers were sentenced to death for treason. Many others were allowed to remain in the military without reprimand.

The purge of the officer corps contributed to the inability of the Cuban army to successfully combat Castro and his guerrillas. Batista's police responded to increasing popular unrest by torturing and killing young men in the cities. However, his army was ineffective against the rebels based in the Sierra Maestra and Escambray Mountains. Another possible explanation for the failure to crush the rebellion was offered by author Carlos Alberto Montaner: "Batista does not finish Fidel out of greed ... His is a government of thieves. To have this small guerrilla band in the mountains is to his advantage, so that he can order special defense expenditures that they can steal." Batista's rule became increasingly unpopular among the population, and the Soviet Union began to secretly support Castro. Some of Batista's generals also criticized him in later years, saying that Batista's excessive interference in his generals' military plans to defeat the rebels hampered Army morale and rendered all operations ineffective.

It is clear that counter-terror became the strategy of the Batista government. It has been estimated that perhaps as many as 20,000 civilians were killed.

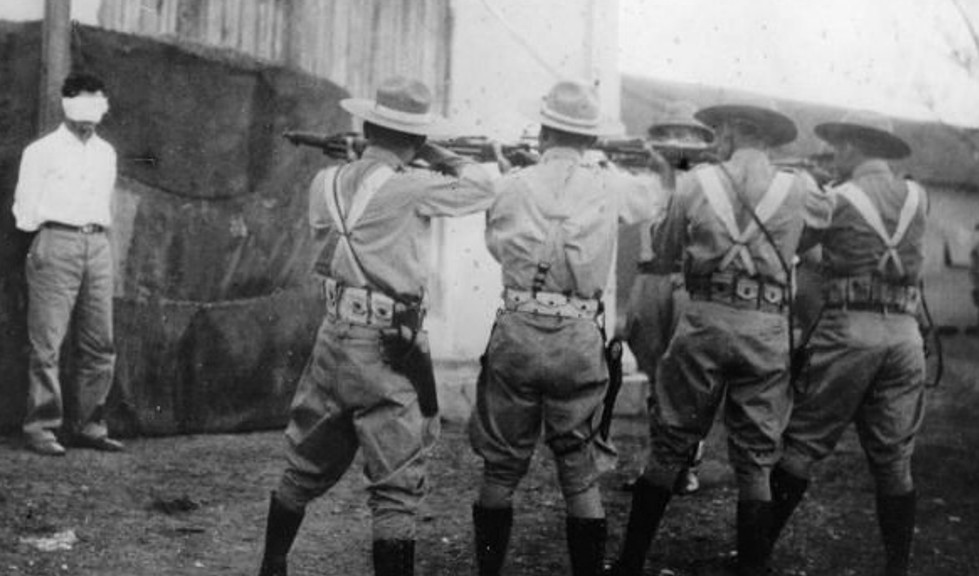
Batista's soldiers executing a man by firing squad who was accused of murdering a Lieutenant.

In an effort to gather information about Castro's army, Batista's secret police pulled in people for questioning. Many innocent people were tortured by Batista's secret police, while suspects, including youth, were publicly executed as a warning to others who were considering joining the insurgency. Additionally, "Hundreds of mangled bodies were left hanging from lamp posts or dumped in the streets in a grotesque variation of the Spanish colonial practice of public executions." The brutal behavior backfired and increased support for the guerrillas. In 1958, 45 organizations signed an open letter supporting July 26 Movement, among them national bodies representing lawyers, architects, dentists, accountants, and social workers.

The United States supplied Batista with planes, ships, tanks and the latest technology, such as napalm, which he used against the insurgency. However, in March 1958, the U.S. announced it would stop selling arms to the Cuban government. Soon after, the U.S. imposed an arms embargo, further weakening the government's position, although landowners and others who benefited from the government continued to support Batista.

Elections were scheduled for June 1958, as required by the Constitution, but were delayed until November 1958, when Castro and the revolutionaries called for a general strike and placed several bombs in several areas of the country. Three main candidates ran in the elections: Carlos Márquez Sterling of the Party of the Free People, former President Ramón Grau San Martín of the Cuban Revolutionary Party-Authentic, and Andrés Rivero Agüero of the government coalition. According to Carlos Márquez Sterling, all three were threatened by Castro, and several assassination attempts were made on both Ramón Grau San Martín and Carlos Márquez Sterling. On Election Day, estimates on the turnout range from 30 to 50% in the areas where voting took place, which did not include parts of Las Villas and Oriente, which were controlled by Castro. Márquez Sterling also stated that the initial results were favorable to him, but the military ordered the counting to stop as they changed the actual ballots for fraudulent ones. However, Grau San Martín, as he had previously done in the 1954 elections, withdrew his candidacy within a few hours of the election day. Batista declared Rivero Agüero the winner.

The U.S. rejected the results of the elections and announced plans to withhold diplomatic recognition of the Rivero Agüero government. The American ambassador to Cuba Earl Smith informed Agüero that the United States would not give aid and support to his government. Smith also informed Batista that the U.S. believed him incapable of maintaining effective control and that he should retire.

Throughout December 1958, in the leadup to the Battle of Santa Clara, top military commanders began plotting the removal of Batista. On December 24, General Eulogio Cantillo secretly met with Fidel Castro and agreed to arrest Batista. Cantillo also agreed that his new government would merge with the 26th of July Movement to create a new united government.

On December 30, 1958, Cantillo notified Castro that coup plans had changed. Cantillo privately advised Batista that he should flee the country. Around midnight on January 1, 1959, during the Triumph of the Revolution, Batista, realizing that his presidency could not continue, informed his cabinet and top officials at Camp Columbia, the Havana headquarters of the Cuban Constitutional Army, that he was resigning and would leave the country. At about 3:00 a.m., Batista boarded a plane in the Camp Columbia airfield with 40 of his supporters and immediate family members and flew to Ciudad Trujillo in the Dominican Republic. A second plane flew out of Havana later in the night, carrying ministers, officers, and the Governor of Havana, and a third plane followed. Batista took along a personal fortune of more than $300 million that he had amassed through bribery and corruption. Critics accused Batista and his supporters of taking as much as $700 million in fine art and cash with them as they fled into exile.

As news of the fall of Batista's government spread through Havana, The New York Times described jubilant crowds pouring into the streets and automobile horns honking. The black and red flag of the July 26 Movement waved on cars and buildings. The atmosphere was chaotic. On January 8, 1959, Castro and his army rolled victoriously into Havana. Already denied entry to the United States, Batista sought asylum in Mexico, which also refused him. Portugal's dictator António Salazar allowed him to settle there on the condition that he completely abstain from politics.

Historians and primary documents estimate between hundreds and 20,000 Cubans were killed under the Batista regime.

However, the figure of 20,000 deaths is disputed by several historians, who consider it "propaganda". According to French historian Jeannine Verdès-Leroux:

[...] Intellectuals and journalists have endlessly hammered home the falsified figure of 20,000 deaths. Castro only spoke, in his report to the 1st Congress of the Cuban Communist Party, of an "incalculable" number of victims. Specialists agree to conclude that the figure of 2,000 deaths is a high maximum.

== Disputed death count ==
People were killed, with estimates ranging from hundreds to a maximum of 20,000, although this high figure is disputed.

The figure of 20,000 was first written in Bohemia – the most popular magazine in Cuba – by Enrique de la Osa. Historical consensus maintains that De la Osa – a hardline communist and fierce friend to Fidel Castro – completely fabricated this figure, among many other fabrications he wrote in the famous section of Bohemia he directed that was called "En Cuba." Fidel Castro later positioned Enrique de la Osa to become director of Bohemia, and forced Miguel Ángel Quevedo into exile.

These tactics ultimately failed to quell unrest and instead were the catalyst for more widespread resistance. For two years (December 1956 – December 1958) Fidel Castro's 26th of July Movement and other rebelling elements led an urban- and rural-based guerrilla uprising against Batista's government, which culminated in his eventual defeat by the rebels under the command of Che Guevara at the Battle of Santa Clara on New Year's Day 1959. Batista immediately fled the island with an amassed personal fortune to the Dominican Republic, where strongman and previous military ally Rafael Trujillo held power. Batista eventually found political asylum in António Salazar's Portugal, where he first lived on the island of Madeira and then in Estoril. He was involved in business activities in Francoist Spain and was staying there in Marbella at the time of his death from a heart attack in 1973.

== Personal life ==
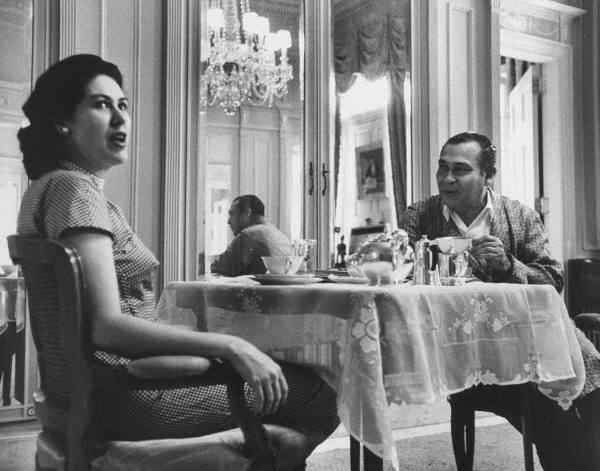
Batista and his wife Marta Fernández Miranda at breakfast in the Presidential Palace in April 1958

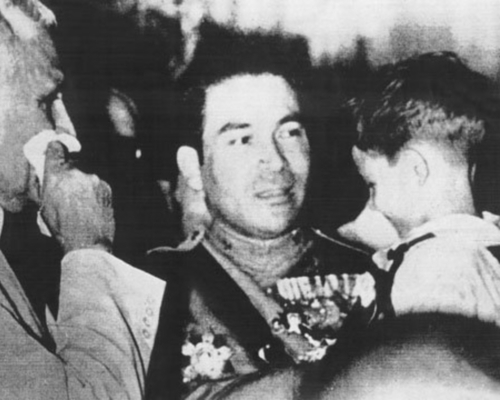
Batista holding a 7-year old Raúl Castro, a person who will take part in the Cuban Revolution against his dictatorship, 1938

=== Marriages and children ===
Batista married Elisa Godínez y Gómez on July 10, 1926. They had three children: Mirta Caridad (1927–2010), Elisa Aleida (born 1933), and Fulgencio Rubén Batista Godínez (1933–2007). By all accounts, she was devoted to him and their children throughout their marriage, and their daughter remembered them as a "happy, young couple" until their sudden divorce. Much to her surprise, he divorced her in October 1945 against her will in order to marry his longtime mistress Marta Fernández Miranda.

He married Fernández on November 28, 1945, shortly after his divorce became final, and they had five children: Jorge Luis (born 1942), Roberto Francisco (born 1947), Carlos Manuel (1950–1969), Fulgencio José (born 1953) and Marta María Batista Fernández (born 1957).

==== Extramarital affairs ====
Batista was an inveterate philanderer who engaged in numerous extramarital affairs throughout his first marriage. He cheated on his first wife with multiple women, and his children eventually became aware of his relationships. His first wife, who supported her husband throughout his political career and found his philandering humiliating, never considered divorce and tolerated his multiple affairs. However, Batista became enamored with the much younger Marta Fernández Miranda, who became his longtime mistress. He filed divorce papers shortly before his first grandchild was born. His first wife and their children were astounded and devastated by the divorce.

In 1935, he had with his mistress Marina Estévez an illegitimate daughter, Fermina Lázara Carmela de las Mercedes Batista Estévez, whom he supported financially.

== Later life and death ==
After he fled to Portugal, Batista lived in Madeira, then later in Estoril. He died of a heart attack on August 6, 1973, in Marbella, Spain.

Marta Fernández Miranda de Batista, Batista's widow, died on October 2, 2006. Roberto Batista, her son, said that she died at her home in West Palm Beach, Florida, US. She had Alzheimer's disease.

== Political and economic views ==
During his first term he advocated for corporatism and statism, however after his first term he began to embrace economic liberalism.

== Books written by Batista ==
- Estoy con el Pueblo (I am With the People), Havana, 1939
- Respuesta, Manuel León Sánchez S.C.L., Mexico City, 1960
- Piedras y leyes (Stones and Laws), Mexico City, 1961
- Cuba Betrayed, Vantage Press, New York, 1961
- To Rule is to Foresee, 1962
- The Growth and Decline of the Cuban Republic, Devin-Adair Company, New York, 1964
