= 2019 local electoral calendar =

Worldwide local elections held in 2019

This local electoral calendar for 2019 lists the subnational elections held in 2019. Referendums, retention elections, and national by-elections (special elections) are also included.

== January ==
- 3 January: Federated States of Micronesia, Kosrae, Lieutenant Governor (2nd round)
- 6 January: Hong Kong, Rural Committees (1st phase)
- 13 January: Hong Kong, Rural Committees (2nd phase)
- 19 January: India, Assam, North Cachar Hills, Autonomous District Council
- 20 January:
  - Hong Kong, Rural Committees (3rd phase)
  - Italy, Cagliari, Chamber of Deputies by-election
- 21 January:
  - Cook Islands, Ivirua, Parliament by-election
  - India
    - Assam
      - Dhemaji District, Mising Autonomous Council
      - Dibrugarh District, Sonowal Kachari Autonomous Council
      - Goalpara District and Kamrup District, Rabha Hasong Autonomous Council
    - Telangana, Village Councils (1st phase)
  - Philippines, Bangsamoro Autonomous Region in Muslim Mindanao (BARMM), Autonomy referendum (1st part)
- 25 January: India, Telangana, Village Councils (2nd phase)
- 26 January: Malaysia, Cameron Highlands, House of Representatives by-election
- 27 January:
  - Argentina, La Rioja, Constitutional referendum
  - Japan, Yamanashi, Governor
  - Taiwan, Taichung and Taipei, Legislative Yuan by-elections
- 28 January: India, Rajasthan, Legislative Assembly (Ramgarh only)
- 30 January: India, Telangana, Village Councils (3rd phase)
- 31 January: Ghana, Ayawaso West, Parliament by-election
- 31 January – 13 February: Germany, Bavaria, Biodiversity and Natural Beauty referendum

== February ==
- 2 February: Pakistan, NA-91, National Assembly by-election
- 3 February: Japan, Aichi, Governor
- 6 February: Philippines, Bangsamoro Autonomous Region in Muslim Mindanao (BARMM), Autonomy referendum (2nd part)
- 10 February:
  - Italy, Abruzzo, Regional Council
  - Switzerland
    - Appenzell Ausserrhoden, Executive Council
    - Basel-Landschaft, referendums
    - Basel-Stadt, referendums
    - Bern, referendums
    - Geneva, referendums
    - St. Gallen, referendum
    - Ticino, referendums
    - Uri, referendum
    - Zürich, referendums
- 12 February:
  - United States, Oklahoma City, City Council
  - Zambia, Sesheke, National Assembly by-election
- 24 February:
  - Italy, Sardinia, Regional Council
  - Japan, Okinawa, Landfill referendum
- 25 February: Canada, Burnaby South, Outremont and York—Simcoe, House of Commons by-elections
- 26 February: United States
  - Chicago, Mayor and City Council (1st round)
  - New York City, Public Advocate special election
- 27 February: India, Meghalaya
  - Jaintia Hills Autonomous District, Council
  - Khasi Hills Autonomous District, Council
- 28 February: Bangladesh, Dhaka North, Mayor by-election

== March ==
- 2 March: Malaysia, Semenyih, House of Representatives by-election
- 3 March:
  - Lithuania, Mayors and Municipal Councils (1st round)
  - Nicaragua
    - North Caribbean Coast Autonomous Region, Regional Council
    - South Caribbean Coast Autonomous Region, Regional Council
  - Poland, Gdańsk, Mayor special election
- 5 March:
  - Federated States of Micronesia, Chuuk, House of Representatives
  - United States, Tampa, Mayor and City Council (1st round)
- 9 March: Nigeria
  - Abia, Governor and House of Assembly
  - Adamawa, Governor and House of Assembly
  - Akwa Ibom, Governor and House of Assembly
  - Anambra, House of Assembly
  - Bauchi, Governor and House of Assembly
  - Bayelsa, House of Assembly
  - Benue, Governor and House of Assembly
  - Borno, Governor and House of Assembly
  - Cross River, Governor and House of Assembly
  - Delta, Governor and House of Assembly
  - Ebonyi, Governor and House of Assembly
  - Edo, House of Assembly
  - Ekiti, House of Assembly
  - Enugu, Governor and House of Assembly
  - Federal Capital Territory, Local Government Councils and Chairmen
  - Gombe, Governor and House of Assembly
  - Imo, Governor and House of Assembly
  - Jigawa, Governor and House of Assembly
  - Kaduna, Governor and House of Assembly
  - Kano, Governor and House of Assembly
  - Katsina, Governor and House of Assembly
  - Kebbi, Governor and House of Assembly
  - Kogi, House of Assembly
  - Kwara, Governor and House of Assembly
  - Lagos, Governor and House of Assembly
  - Nasarawa, Governor and House of Assembly
  - Niger, Governor and House of Assembly
  - Ogun, Governor and House of Assembly
  - Ondo, House of Assembly
  - Osun, House of Assembly
  - Oyo, Governor and House of Assembly
  - Plateau, Governor and House of Assembly
  - Rivers, Governor and House of Assembly
  - Sokoto, Governor and House of Assembly
  - Taraba, Governor and House of Assembly
  - Yobe, Governor and House of Assembly
  - Zamfara, Governor and House of Assembly
- 10 March:
  - Argentina, Neuquén, Governor, Provincial Legislature, Mayors and Municipal Councils
  - Austria, Salzburg, Mayors (1st round) and Municipal Councils
  - Bangladesh, Sub-district Councils (1st phase)
  - Switzerland, St. Gallen, Council of States by-election (1st round)
- 12 March: United States, Phoenix, Mayor (2nd round) and City Council (1st round) special elections
- 16 March:
  - Kuwait, Second District and Third District, National Assembly by-elections
  - Taiwan, Changhua, Kinmen, New Taipei and Tainan, Legislative Yuan by-elections
- 17 March:
  - Lithuania, Mayors and Municipal Councils (2nd round)
  - Monaco, Communal Council
  - Switzerland, Appenzell Ausserrhoden, Cantonal Council
  - Bangladesh, Sub-district Councils (2nd phase)
  - Cook Islands, Tengatangi-Areora-Ngatiarua, Parliament by-election
- 19 March: United States, Jacksonville, Mayor, Property Appraiser, Sheriff, Supervisor of Elections, Tax Collector and City Council (1st round)
- 20 March: Netherlands
  - Dutch Provincial Parliaments
  - Dutch Water Boards
  - Bonaire, Electoral College and Island Council
  - Saba, Electoral College and Island Council
  - Sint Eustatius, Electoral College
- 22 March: Samoa, Fa'asaleleaga, Legislative Assembly by-election
- 23 March:
  - Australia, New South Wales, Legislative Assembly and Legislative Council
  - Nigeria
    - Adamawa, House of Assembly (rescheduled) in Nassarawo/Binyeri, revote in Uba/Gaya)
    - Bauchi, Governor (revote) in Tafawa Balewa)
    - Benue, Governor and House of Assembly (revote in) Kwande and Ukum)
    - Kano, Governor and House of Assembly (revote) in Nasarawa)
    - Kogi, House of Assembly (revote in) Igalamela-Odolu, Lokoja and Omala)
    - Plateau, Governor and House of Assembly (revote) in Langtang South)
    - Sokoto, Governor and House of Assembly (revote) in Kebbe)
- 24 March:
  - Austria, Salzburg, Mayors (2nd round)
  - Bangladesh, Sub-district Councils (3rd phase)
  - Comoros
    - Anjouan, Governor (1st round)
    - Grande Comore, Governor (1st round)
    - Mohéli, Governor (1st round)
  - Ecuador, Provincial Prefects, Mayors, Municipal Councils and Parish Boards
    - Guayaquil, Mayor and Municipal Council
    - Quito, Mayor and Metropolitan Council
  - Italy, Basilicata, Regional Council
  - Liechtenstein, Mayors and Municipal Councils
  - Switzerland, Zürich, Executive Council and Cantonal Council
- 26 March: Saint Helena, Ascension and Tristan da Cunha, Tristan da Cunha, Chief Islander and Island Council
- 27 March: Antigua and Barbuda, Barbuda, Council
- 28 March: Nigeria, Adamawa, Governor (revote in 44 constituencies)
- 30 March:
  - Libya, Municipal Councils
  - United States, Louisiana, Circuit Court of Appeal special election
- 31 March:
  - Bangladesh, Sub-district Councils (4th phase)
  - Democratic Republic of the Congo, Beni, Butembo and Yumbi, Provincial Assemblies and National Assembly by-elections
  - Myanmar, Yangon, City Development Committee
  - Turkey, Mayors and Municipal Councils
    - Istanbul, ~~Mayor~~ (election nullified)
  - Switzerland
    - Basel-Landschaft, Executive Council and Landrat
    - Lucerne, Executive Council (1st round) and Cantonal Council

== April ==
- 2 April:
  - United States
    - Anchorage, Assembly
    - Chicago, Mayor and City Council (2nd round)
    - Colorado Springs, Mayor and City Council
    - Kansas City, MO, Mayor and City Council (1st round)
    - Las Vegas, Mayor and City Council (1st round)
    - St. Louis, Board of Aldermen
    - Wisconsin, Supreme Court and Court of Appeals
- 3 April: South Korea, Changwon-Seongsan and Tongyeong-Goseong, National Assembly by-elections
- 4 April:
  - Jamaica, Portland Eastern, House of Representatives by-election
  - United Kingdom, Newport West, House of Commons by-election
- 5 April:
  - Kenya, Embakasi South and Ugenya, National Assembly by-elections
- 5–6 April: Czech Republic, Prague, Senate by-election (1st round)
- 7 April:
  - Argentina, Río Negro, Governor, Provincial Legislature, Mayors and Municipal Councils
  - Japan, Unified Local elections (1st phase)
    - Aichi, Prefectural Assembly
      - Nagoya, City Council
    - Akita, Prefectural Assembly
    - Aomori, Prefectural Assembly
    - Chiba, Prefectural Assembly
    - Ehime, Prefectural Assembly
    - Fukui, Governor and Prefectural Assembly
    - Fukuoka, Governor and Prefectural Assembly
      - Fukuoka City, City Council
    - Gifu, Prefectural Assembly
    - Gunma, Prefectural Assembly
    - Hiroshima, Prefectural Assembly
      - Hiroshima City, Mayor and City Council
    - Hokkaido, Governor and Legislative Assembly
      - Sapporo, Mayor and City Council
    - Hyogo, Prefectural Assembly
      - Kobe, City Council
    - Ishikawa, Prefectural Assembly
    - Kagawa, Prefectural Assembly
    - Kagoshima, Prefectural Assembly
    - Kanagawa, Governor and Prefectural Assembly
      - Kawasaki, City Council
      - Yokohama, City Council
    - Kōchi, Prefectural Assembly
    - Kumamoto, Prefectural Assembly
    - Kyoto, Prefectural Assembly
      - Kyoto City, City Council
    - Mie, Governor and Prefectural Assembly
    - Miyazaki, Prefectural Assembly
    - Nagano, Prefectural Assembly
    - Nagasaki, Prefectural Assembly
    - Nara, Governor and Prefectural Assembly
    - Niigata, Prefectural Assembly
    - Ōita, Governor and Prefectural Assembly
    - Okayama, Prefectural Assembly
    - Osaka, Governor and Prefectural Assembly
      - Osaka City, Mayor and City Council
    - Saga, Prefectural Assembly
    - Saitama, Prefectural Assembly
      - Saitama City, City Council
    - Shiga, Prefectural Assembly
    - Shimane, Governor and Prefectural Assembly
    - Shizuoka, Prefectural Assembly
    - Tochigi, Prefectural Assembly
    - Tokushima, Governor and Prefectural Assembly
    - Tottori, Governor and Prefectural Assembly
    - Toyama, Prefectural Assembly
    - Wakayama, Prefectural Assembly
    - Yamagata, Prefectural Assembly
    - Yamaguchi, Prefectural Assembly
    - Yamanashi, Prefectural Assembly
  - Switzerland, Ticino, Council of State and Grand Council
- 11 April:
  - India
    - Andhra Pradesh, Legislative Assembly
    - Arunachal Pradesh, Legislative Assembly
    - Odisha, Legislative Assembly (1st phase)
    - Sikkim, Legislative Assembly
  - Zambia, Bahati and Roan, National Assembly by-elections
- 12–13 April: Czech Republic, Prague, Senate by-election (2nd round)
- 13 April: Nigeria
  - Federal Capital Territory, Local Government Councils and Chairmen (local revotes)
  - Rivers, Governor and House of Assembly (revote in Abua–Odual, Ahoada West, Gokana and Opobo–Nkoro)
- 16 April:
  - Canada, Alberta, Legislative Assembly
  - Qatar, Central Municipal Council
- 18 April: India, Odisha, Legislative Assembly (2nd phase)
- 20 April: Libya, Municipal Councils
- 21 April:
  - Comoros
    - Anjouan, Governor (2nd round)
    - Grande Comore, Governor (2nd round)
    - Mohéli, Governor (2nd round)
  - Japan
    - Okinawa 3rd district and Osaka 12th district, House of Representatives by-elections
    - Unified Local elections (2nd phase), City, Ward, Town and Village Mayors and Councils
- 23 April:
  - Canada, Prince Edward Island, Legislative Assembly and Electoral Reform referendum
  - India, Odisha, Legislative Assembly (3rd phase)
  - United States, Tampa, Mayor and City Council (2nd round)
- 25 April: Kenya, Wajir West, National Assembly by-election
- 27 April: Nigeria, Zamfara, Local Government Councils and Chairmen
- 28 April:
  - Italy, Sicily, Mayors and City Councils (1st round)
  - Spain, Valencian Community, Parliament
  - Switzerland, Appenzell Innerrhoden
    - Council of States by-election
    - Landsgemeinde
- 29 April: India, Odisha, Legislative Assembly (4th phase)

== May ==
- 2 May: United Kingdom
  - England, Metropolitan Borough Councils, Unitary Authorities, District Councils and Mayors
    - Leeds, City Council
    - Liverpool, City Council
    - Manchester, City Council
  - Northern Ireland, District Councils
- 4 May:
  - Australia, Tasmania, (Montgomery, Nelson and Pembroke) Legislative Council
  - United States
    - Arlington, Mayor and City Council (1st round)
    - Dallas, Mayor and City Council (1st round)
    - Fort Worth, Mayor and City Council
    - San Antonio, Mayor and City Council (1st round)
- 5 May:
  - Bangladesh, Mymensingh, Mayor and City Corporation
  - Croatia, National Minorities Councils (1st round)
  - Panama, Mayors and Municipal Councils
  - Switzerland, Glarus, Landsgemeinde
- 6 May:
  - Canada, Nanaimo—Ladysmith, House of Commons by-election
  - India, Telangana, District Councils and Township Councils (1st phase)
- 7 May: United States, Denver, Mayor, Clerk, City Council (1st round) and Psilocybin Decriminalization referendum
- 8 May: South Africa, Provincial Legislatures
- 10 May: India, Telangana, District Councils and Township Councils (2nd phase)
- 11 May: Malaysia, Sandakan, House of Representatives by-election
- 12 May:
  - Argentina, Córdoba, Governor, Provincial Legislature, Mayors, Municipal Councils and Communal Officers
  - Italy, Sicily, Mayors and City Councils (2nd round)
  - New Caledonia, Provincial Assemblies
- 13 May: Philippines, Governors, Vice Governor, Provincial Councils, Mayors and Municipal Councils
- 14 May:
  - India, Telangana, District Councils and Township Councils (3rd phase)
  - United States, Jacksonville, City Council (2nd round)
- 16 May: Canada, Newfoundland and Labrador, House of Assembly
- 19 May:
  - Argentina, La Pampa, Governor, Chamber of Deputies, Mayors and Municipal Councils
  - Croatia, National Minorities Councils (1st round)
  - Kosovo, North Kosovo, Mayors
  - Switzerland
    - Basel-Landschaft, referendums
    - Basel-Stadt, referendums
    - Bern, referendum
    - Grisons, referendum
    - Lucerne, Executive Council (2nd round)
    - Obwalden, referendum
    - Schwyz, referendum
    - Solothurn, referendum
    - St. Gallen, Council of States by-election (2nd round)
    - Thurgau, referendum
    - Ticino, referendums
    - Uri, referendums
    - Valais, referendum
    - Zug, referendum
- 21 May:
  - Malawi, Local Councils
  - United States, Phoenix, City Council special election (2nd round)
- 24 May: Ireland, City and County Councils
- 25 May: Malta, Local Councils
- 26 May:
  - Belgium
    - Brussels-Capital Region, Brussels Parliament
    - Eastern Belgium, German-speaking Community Parliament
    - Flanders, Flemish Parliament
    - Wallonia, Walloon Parliament
  - Germany
    - Baden-Württemberg, County Councils, Municipal Councils and Local Councils
      - Stuttgart Region, Regional Assembly
        - Stuttgart, City Council and Borough Councils
    - Brandenburg, District Councils, Municipal Councils and Village Councils
    - Bremen, Parliament and City Councils
    - Hamburg, Borough Assemblies
    - Mecklenburg-Vorpommern, County Councils and Municipal Councils
    - Rhineland-Palatinate, County Councils, Mayors, Municipal Councils, Local Councils (1st round)
      - Palatinate District Association, District Council
    - Saarland, District Administrators, District Councils, Mayors and Municipal Councils
    - Saxony, District Councils, Municipal Councils and Local Councils
      - Dresden, City Council and Borough Councils
      - Leipzig, City Council and Borough Councils
    - Saxony-Anhalt, District Councils, Municipal Councils and Local Councils
    - Thuringia, County Councils, Mayors, Municipal Councils, Local Mayors and Local Councils
  - Greece, Regional Councils and Municipal Councils (1st round)
  - Italy
    - Mayors and City Councils (1st round)
    - Piedmont, Regional Council
    - Pergine Valsugana and Trento, Chamber of Deputies by-elections
  - Spain, Regional Legislatures, Municipal Councils and Basque Foral Parliaments
    - Álava, Foral Parliament
    - Aragon, Parliament
      - Zaragoza, City Council
    - Asturias, Parliament
    - Balearic Islands, Parliament and Island Councils
    - Barcelona, City Council
    - Biscay, Foral Parliament
    - Canary Islands, Parliament and Island Cabildos
    - Cantabria, Parliament
    - Castile and León, Parliament
    - Castilla–La Mancha, Parliament
    - Ceuta, Assembly
    - Extremadura, Assembly
    - Gipuzkoa, Foral Parliament
    - La Rioja, Parliament
    - Madrid (Community), Assembly
      - Madrid, City Council
    - Melilla, Assembly
    - Murcia, Assembly
    - Navarre, Parliament
    - Seville, City Council
    - Valencia, City Council
  - Thailand, Chiang Mai constituency 8, House of Representatives by-election
- 29 May: India, Karnataka, Municipal Councils and Town Councils
- 30 May:
  - Nauru, Anabar, Parliament by-election
  - Tonga, District Councillors and Municipal Councillors

== June ==
- 1 June: United States, Cherokee Nation, Principal Chief, Deputy Chief and Tribal Council (1st round)
- 2 June:
  - Argentina
    - Corrientes, Chamber of Deputies and Senate
    - Misiones, Governor, House of Representatives and Mayors
    - San Juan, Governor, Chamber of Deputies and Mayors
  - Greece, Regional Councils and Municipal Councils (2nd round)
  - Japan, Aomori, Governor
  - Mexico
    - Aguascalientes, Municipal Councils
    - Baja California, Governor, Congress and Municipal Councils
    - Durango, Municipal Councils
    - Puebla, Governor and Municipal Councils special election
    - Quintana Roo, Congress
    - Tamaulipas, Congress
- 4 June: United States, Denver, Mayor, Auditor, Clerk and City Council (2nd round)
- 6 June: United Kingdom, Peterborough, House of Commons by-election
- 7 June: India, Telangana, Township Chairs and Deputy Chairs
- 8 June:
  - India, Telangana, District Chairs and Deputy Chairs
  - United States
    - Arlington, City Council (2nd round)
    - Dallas, City Council (2nd round)
    - San Antonio, Mayor and City Council (2nd round)
- 9 June:
  - Argentina
    - Chubut, Governor, Provincial Legislature, Mayors, Municipal Councils and Communal Officers
    - Entre Ríos, Governor, Chamber of Deputies, Senate, Mayors and Municipal Councils
    - Jujuy, Governor, Provincial Legislature, Mayors and Municipal Councils
    - Tucumán, Governor, Provincial Legislature, Mayors and Municipal Councils
  - Italy, Mayors and City Councils (2nd round)
- 11 June: United States, Las Vegas, City Council (2nd round)
- 15 June: Namibia, Ondangwa, National Assembly by-election
- 16 June:
  - Argentina
    - Formosa, Governor, Provincial Legislature, Mayors and Municipal Councils
    - San Luis, Governor, Chamber of Deputies, Senate and Mayors
    - Santa Fe, Governor, Chamber of Deputies, Senate, Mayors and Municipal Councils
    - Tierra del Fuego, Governor, Provincial Legislature, Mayors and Municipal Councils
  - Germany, Rhineland-Palatinate, Mayors (2nd round)
  - Guatemala, Mayors and Municipal Councils
    - Guatemala City, Mayor
    - Mixco, Mayor
    - Villa Nueva, Mayor
  - Italy, Sardinia, Mayors and City Councils (1st round)
- 18 June:
  - Bangladesh, Sub-district Councils (5th phase)
  - United States, Kansas City, MO, Mayor and City Council (2nd round)
- 22 June: Guernsey, Alderney, President by-election
- 23 June: Turkey, Istanbul, Mayor (revote)
- 24 June: Bangladesh, Bogra-6, House of the Nation by-election
- 29 June: Nigeria, Jigawa, Local Government Councils and Chairmen
- 30 June:
  - Albania, Mayors, Municipal Councils, Unit Mayors and Unit Councils
  - Italy, Sardinia, Mayors and City Councils (2nd round)
  - Moldova, Gagauzia, Governor
  - Switzerland, St. Gallen, referendums

== July ==
- 11 July: Uganda, Nebbi, Parliament by-election
- 20 July: Pakistan, Khyber Pakhtunkhwa, Provincial Assembly
- 20 July – 2 August: Papua New Guinea, Local-Level Governments
- 21 July:
  - Japan, Gunma, Governor
  - North Korea, Provincial People's Assemblies, County People's Assemblies and Municipal People's Assemblies
- 23 July: Pakistan, NA-205, National Assembly by-election
- 27 July:
  - India, Tripura, District Councils, Township Councils and Village Councils
  - United States, Cherokee Nation, Tribal Council (2nd round)
- 29 July:
  - Liberia, Montserrado, Senatorial by-election
  - Liberia, Montserrado-15, House of Representatives by-election (election partially re-ran)
- 30 July: Zambia, Katuba, National Assembly by-election

== August ==
- 1 August:
  - United Kingdom, Brecon and Radnorshire, House of Commons by-election
  - United States, Nashville, Mayor and Metropolitan Council (1st round)
- 3 August: Zimbabwe, Lupane East, House of Assembly by-election
- 5 August: India, Vellore, House of the People by-election
- 6 August: United States
  - King County, Council (1st round)
  - Wichita, Mayor (1st round)
- 10 August:
  - Gabon, Cocobeach, Libreville—VI^{e}, Mbigou, Mékambo, Mimongo, Mitzic, Mouila—I^{e} and Offoué-Onoye, National Assembly by-elections (1st round)
  - Nigeria, Bayelsa, Local Government Councils and Chairmen
- 11 August: Argentina, Santa Cruz, Governor, Chamber of Deputies, Development Commissioners, Mayors and Municipal Councils
- 24 August: Sierra Leone, Freetown Constituency 110, ~~Parliament by-election~~ (election nullified)
- 25 August: Japan, Saitama, Governor
- 28 August: Liberia, Montserrado-15, House of Representatives by-election (partial re-run)
- 29 August: United Kingdom, Scotland, Shetland, Parliament by-election
- 31 August: Gabon, Mbigou, Mimongo and Mouila—I^{e}, National Assembly by-elections (2nd round)

== September ==
- 1 September:
  - Germany
    - Brandenburg, Parliament
    - Saxony, Parliament
  - Switzerland, Zürich, referendum
- 7 September: Zimbabwe, Glen View South, Mangwe and Masvingo North Ward 1, House of Assembly by-elections
- 8 September:
  - Artsakh, Mayors, Local Councils and Community Chiefs
  - Japan, Iwate, Governor and Prefectural Assembly
  - Lithuania, Gargždai, Žiemgala constituency and Žirmūnai, Seimas by-elections (1st round)
  - Russia, State Duma by-elections, Federal Subject Heads, Federal Subject Legislatures, Municipal Heads, Municipal Councils, District Councils, Village Councils and Local referendums
    - Altai Republic, Head and State Assembly
    - Astrakhan Oblast, Governor
    - Bashkortostan, Head
    - Bryansk Oblast, Duma
    - Chelyabinsk Oblast, Governor
    - Crimea, State Council
    - Kabardino-Balkaria, Parliament
    - Kalmykia, Head
    - Karachay-Cherkessia, People's Assembly
    - Khabarovsk Krai, Legislative Duma and District 70, State Duma by-election
    - Kurgan Oblast, Governor
    - Kursk Oblast, Governor
    - Lipetsk Oblast, Head of Administration
    - Mari El, State Assembly
    - Moscow, City Duma
    - Murmansk Oblast, Governor
    - Novgorod Oblast, District 134, State Duma by-election
    - Novosibirsk, Mayor
    - Orenburg Oblast, Governor
    - Oryol Oblast, District 145, State Duma by-election
    - Saint Petersburg, Governor and Municipal Councils
    - Sakhalin Oblast, Governor special election
    - Sevastopol, Legislative Assembly
    - Stavropol Krai, Governor
    - Sverdlovsk Oblast, District 174, State Duma by-election
    - Tatarstan, State Council
    - Tula Oblast, Duma
    - Tuva, Great Parliament
    - Volgograd Oblast, Governor and Duma
    - Vologda Oblast, Governor
    - Zabaykalsky Krai, Governor special election
- 9 September: Norway, County Councils and Municipal Councils
- 10 September:
  - Canada, Manitoba, Legislative Assembly
  - United States, North Carolina's 3rd congressional district and North Carolina's 9th congressional district, U.S. House of Representatives special elections
- 12 September: United States, Nashville, Mayor and Metropolitan Council (2nd round)
- 14 September: Sierra Leone, Falaba Constituency 40, Parliament by-election
- 19 September: Philippines, Santo Tomas, Batangas, cityhood plebiscite
- 21 September: Zimbabwe, Zaka East, House of Assembly by-election
- 22 September:
  - Lithuania, Gargždai, Žiemgala constituency and Žirmūnai, Seimas by-elections (2nd round)
  - Portugal, Madeira, Legislative Assembly
- Switzerland, Schaffhausen, referendum
- 24 September: United States, Boston, City Council (1st round)
- 26 September: Saint Helena, Ascension and Tristan da Cunha, Ascension Island, Council
- 29 September: Argentina, Mendoza, Governor, Chamber of Deputies, Senate, Mayors and Municipal Councils

== October ==
- 1 October: Canada, Northwest Territories, Legislative Assembly
- 3 October:
  - Liberia, Grand Cape Mount, Senate by-election
  - United States, Memphis, Mayor and City Council (1st round)
- 5 October:
  - Bangladesh, Rangpur-3, House of the Nation by-election
  - India, Uttarakhand, District Councils, Block Councils and Village Councils (1st phase)
  - Liberia, Grand Cape Mount, Senatorial by-election
- 8 October: United States, Raleigh, Mayor and City Council
- 11 October: India, Uttarakhand, District Councils, Block Councils and Village Councils (2nd phase)
- 12 October:
  - New Zealand, Regional Councils, Mayors, Territorial Authority Councils and District Health Boards
    - Auckland, Mayor, Council and Local Boards
    - Greater Wellington, Regional Council
      - Wellington, Mayor and Council
  - United States, Louisiana
    - Governor, Lieutenant Governor, Attorney General, Board of Elementary and Secondary Education, Commissioner of Agriculture and Forestry, Commissioner of Insurance, Secretary of State and Treasurer (1st round)
    - House of Representatives and Senate elections (1st round)
    - Supreme Court special election (1st round)
- 13 October:
  - Argentina, Chaco, Governor, Provincial Legislature, Mayors and Municipal Councils
  - Austria, Vorarlberg, Parliament
  - Hungary, Mayors, County Assemblies and Municipal Assemblies
    - Budapest, Mayor and Assembly
- 15 October:
  - Mozambique, Governors and Provincial Assemblies
  - Sri Lanka, Elpitiya, Divisional Council
- 16 October: India, Uttarakhand, District Councils, Block Councils and Village Councils (3rd phase)
- 19 October: Australia
  - Christmas Island, Shire Council
  - Cocos (Keeling) Islands, Shire Council
  - Western Australia, Mayors, Regional Councils, City Councils and Shire Councils
- 20 October:
  - Finland, Åland, Parliament and Municipal Councils
  - Moldova, Mayors (1st round), District Councils and Municipal Councils
    - Gagauzia, Mayors (1st round) and Municipal Councils
  - Switzerland
    - Bern, Executive Council (1st round)
    - Jura, referendum
    - Neuchâtel, Council of State
    - Uri, referendums
- 21 October: India
  - Haryana, Legislative Assembly
  - Maharashtra, Legislative Assembly
  - Samastipur and Satara, House of the People by-elections
- 23 October:
  - Botswana, District Councils, City Councils and Town Councils
  - Thailand, Nakhon Pathom constituency 5, House of Representatives by-election
- 26 October: Nigeria, Kebbi, Local Government Councils and Chairmen
- 27 October:
  - Argentina
    - Buenos Aires City, Chief of Government, City Legislature and Communal Boards
    - Buenos Aires, Governor, Chamber of Deputies, Senate, Mayors, Municipal Councils and School Counselors
    - Catamarca, Governor, Chamber of Deputies, Senate, Mayors and Municipal Councils
    - La Rioja, Governor, Provincial Legislature, Mayors and Municipal Councils
  - Bulgaria, Mayors (1st round), Municipal Councils and Ward Mayors
  - Colombia, Governors, Departmental Assemblies, Mayors, Municipal Councils and Local Administrative Boards
    - Bogotá, Mayors, District Council and Local Administrative Boards
    - Cali, Mayor, City Council and Local Administrative Boards
    - Medellín, Mayor, City Council and Local Administrative Boards
  - Germany
    - Hanover, Lord Mayor (1st round)
    - Thuringia, Parliament
  - Italy, Umbria, Legislative Assembly
  - Japan
    - Miyagi, Prefectural Assembly
    - Saitama, House of Councillors by-election

== November ==
- 3 November:
  - Bulgaria, Mayors (2nd round)
  - Moldova, Mayors (2nd round)
    - Gagauzia, Mayors (2nd round)
- 5 November: United States, State and Local elections
  - Kentucky
    - Governor, Agriculture Commissioner, Attorney General, Auditor, Secretary of State and Treasurer
    - Supreme Court and Court of Appeals special elections
  - Mississippi
    - Governor, Lieutenant Governor, Attorney General, Auditor, Commissioner of Agriculture and Commerce, Commissioner of Insurance, Public Service Commission, Secretary of State, Transportation Commission and Treasurer
    - House of Representatives and Senate
  - New Jersey, General Assembly
  - Pennsylvania, Commonwealth Court and Superior Court retention elections, and Superior Court
  - Texas, Prohibit State Income Tax constitutional referendum
  - Virginia, House of Delegates and Senate
  - Washington, Court of Appeals
  - Albuquerque, City Council (1st round) and Democracy Dollars Program referendum
  - Aurora, CO, Mayor and City Council
  - Boston, City Council (2nd round)
  - Charlotte, Mayor and City Council
  - Columbus, Mayor and City Council
  - Houston, Mayor and City Council (1st round)
  - Indianapolis, Mayor and City-County Council
  - King County, Council (2nd round)
    - Seattle, City Council
  - Miami, City Commission (1st round)
  - New York City, Public Advocate and Ranked-Choice Voting referendum
  - Philadelphia, Mayor and City Council
  - Pittsburgh, City Council
  - San Francisco, Mayor and District Attorney
  - Tucson, Mayor, City Council and Sanctuary City referendum
  - Wichita, Mayor (2nd round) and City Council
- 7 November: Kenya, Kibra, National Assembly by-election
- 10 November:
  - Argentina, Salta, Governor, Chamber of Deputies, Senate, Mayors and Municipal Councils
  - Germany, Hanover, Lord Mayor (2nd round)
  - Japan, Fukushima, Prefectural Assembly
- 12 November: Federated States of Micronesia, Pohnpei, Governor and State Legislature
- 14 November: United States, Memphis, City Council (2nd round)
- 16 November:
  - India, Rajasthan, Municipal Corporations, Municipal Councils and Town Councils
  - Malaysia, Tanjung Piai, House of Representatives by-election
  - Nigeria
    - Bayelsa, Governor
    - Kogi, Governor
  - United States, Louisiana
    - Governor, Board of Elementary and Secondary Education and Secretary of State (2nd round)
    - House of Representatives and Senate (2nd round)
    - Supreme Court special election (2nd round)
- 17 November: Switzerland
  - Bern, Executive Council (2nd round)
  - Schaffhausen, referendum
  - St. Gallen, referendums
- 19 November: United States, Miami, City Commission (2nd round)
- 20 November: Ethiopia, Sidama, Regionalization referendum
- 21 November: Bermuda, Pembroke Central, House of Assembly by-election
- 24 November:
  - Austria, Styria, Parliament
  - Hong Kong, District Councils
  - Japan, Kōchi, Governor
  - Macau, Industry, Commerce and Finance functional constituency, Legislative Assembly by-election
  - Switzerland
    - Basel-Landschaft, referendums
    - Basel-Stadt, referendum
    - Geneva, referendums
    - Nidwalden, referendum
    - Schwyz, referendum
    - Zug, referendum
  - Tanzania, Municipal Councils and Street/Village Chairs
- 26 November: India, Rajasthan, Municipal Chairs
- 26–29 November: Papua New Guinea, Local-Level Governments (revotes)
- 27 November:
  - India, Rajasthan, Municipal Deputy Chairs
  - Madagascar, Mayors and Municipal Councils
  - Saint Helena, Ascension and Tristan da Cunha, Saint Helena, Legislative Council by-election
- 28 November: Tonga, Tongatapu 1, Legislative Assembly by-election
- 30 November:
  - India, Jharkhand, Legislative Assembly (1st phase)
  - Ireland, Cork North-Central, Dublin Fingal, Dublin Mid-West and Wexford, Assembly by-elections
  - Nepal, Kaski 2, House of Representatives by-election
  - Nigeria, Niger, Local Government Councils and Chairmen

== December ==
- 2 December: Trinidad and Tobago, Trinidad, Regional Councils and Municipal Councils
- 5 December: India, Karnataka, Legislative Assembly state by-elections (15 seats)
- 7 December:
  - India, Jharkhand, Legislative Assembly (2nd phase)
  - Nigeria
    - Adamawa, Local Government Councils and Chairmen
    - Ekiti, Local Government Councils and Chairmen
  - Philippines, Compostela Valley, Province Renaming referendum
- 10 December: United States, Albuquerque, City Council (2nd round)
- 12 December: India, Jharkhand, Legislative Assembly (3rd phase)
- 14 December: United States, Houston, Mayor (2nd round)
- 15 December:
  - Andorra, Municipal Councils
  - San Marino, Mayors and Municipal Councils
- 16 December: India, Jharkhand, Legislative Assembly (4th phase)
- 17 December: Ghana, District Assemblies and Unit Committees
- 20 December: India, Jharkhand, Legislative Assembly (5th phase)
- 21 December: India, Chhattisgarh, Municipal Corporations, Municipal Councils and Town Councils
- 22 December:
  - Thailand, Khon Kaen constituency 7, House of Representatives by-election
  - Uzbekistan, Regional Councils, District Councils and City Councils (1st round)
- 23 December: Azerbaijan, Municipal Councils
- 27 December: India, Tamil Nadu, District Councils, Township Councils and Village Councils (1st phase)
- 30 December: India, Tamil Nadu, District Councils, Township Councils and Village Councils (2nd phase)
