= 2014 Andhra Pradesh local elections =

2014 Andhra Pradesh local elections may refer to:

- 2014 Andhra Pradesh rural local bodies elections
- 2014 Andhra Pradesh urban local bodies elections
