= Seitaro Hattori =

Japanese politician

- 服部 誠太郎
- Hattori in 2026

Governor of Fukuoka Prefecture
- Incumbent
- Assumed office 14 April 2021
- Monarch: Naruhito
- Preceded by: Hiroshi Ogawa

Vice Governor of Fukuoka Prefecture
- In office 13 September 2011 – 14 April 2021
- Governor: Hiroshi Ogawa
- Preceded by: Nagao Ushio
- Succeeded by: Akie Omagari

Personal details
- Born: 11 September 1954 (age 72) Kokura, Fukuoka, Japan
- Party: Independent
- Children: 3
- Education: Chuo University (LLB)

Seitaro Hattori (服部誠太郎, Hattori Seitarō; born 11 September 1954) is a Japanese politician. He currently serves as governor of Fukuoka Prefecture since 2021.

== Early life and education ==
Hattori was born on 11 September 1954, in Kokura, (now part of Kokurakita-ku, Kitakyushu) in Fukuoka Prefecture. He graduated elementary at Kitakyushu Municipal Izumidai Elementary School. He graduated middle school at Kitakyushu City Shinozaki Middle School. He graduated high school at Fukuoka Prefectural Kokura High School. He graduated college at Chuo University Faculty of Law.

== Political career ==
He started working at the Fukuoka Agriculture and Forestry Office and in 1977. He become the director of the Academic Affairs Division, Private School Promotion Bureau, General Affairs Department in 2004. He become the first person from within the government to be appointed as Director of the Finance Division, General Affairs Department in 2006. He become deputy director of General Affairs Department in 2009 and he was promoted as the Director of Welfare and Labor Affairs Department in 2010.

=== Vice governor of Fukuoka (2011–2021) ===
On 13 September 2011, He was appointed as Vice Governor of Fukuoka, replacing then-Vice Governor Nagao Ushio resigned. On 25 August 2017, after then-governor Hiroshi Ogawa was hospitalized after underging surgery to remove a tumor from his liver, he becomes the acting Governor of Fukuoka for two weeks. He once again became acting governor after Ogawa was hospitalized in January 2021 and later resigned as Governor of Fukuoka on 22 February.

=== Governor of Fukuoka (2021–present) ===
He announced that he would run for governor after Ogawa announced his resignation. Although independent, he was endorsed and supported by the all three factions of Liberal Democratic Party (LDP) in Fukuoka which is the first time since a conservative split in 2008. He also received endorsement from the Constitutional Democratic Party of Japan, Komeito, the Social Democratic Party of Japan, and the Prefectural Agricultural Policy Association. He won by a landslide against Mieko Hoshino garnering 992,255 votes. He was the first governor in Fukuoka to be elected that previously works within the prefectural government. He was reelected for the second term in 2025 receiving 1,036,280 votes.

== Personal life ==
He is married and has three daughters.
