= 2019 Fukuoka gubernatorial election =

Japanese prefectural election

A gubernatorial election was held on 7 April 2019 to elect the next governor of Fukuoka.

== Candidates ==
- Hirochi Ogawa* back by the local LDP, Komeito.
- Kazuhisa Takeuchi, back by the national LDP.
- Kiyoshi Shinoda, back by the JCP.

== Results ==
Fukuoka gubernatorial 2019
Party	Candidate	Votes	%	±%
LDP	Hirochi Ogawa	1.293.648	73.56	− 8.00
LDP	Kazuhisa Takeuchi	345.085	19.62	n/a
JCP	Kiyoshi Shinoda	119.781	6.81	− 11.62
Turnout		1.785.825	42.72	+ 3.87
Registered electors		4.180.574		
LDP hold		Swing	8.00	
