= 2019 Italian by-elections =

Special elections in Italy to fill vacancies

The 2019 Italian by-elections were the elections called to fill seats of the Parliament that had become vacant after the 2018 general elections.

== Overview ==
The new Italian electoral law approved in 2017 and nicknamed Rosatellum, provides the election of members of Parliament in 232 single-member districts for the Chamber of Deputies and in 116 for the Senate of the Republic. Whenever a seat of this kind becomes vacant, a by-election is called, and a new representative is elected.

== Chamber of Deputies ==
=== Sardinia 1: Cagliari ===
Map of the district.

The by-election in the district of Cagliari, Sardinia was held on 20 January 2019, to elect a deputy for the seat left vacant by Andrea Mura, whose resignation was approved by the Chamber of Deputies on 27 September 2018.

The deadline for the presentation of names for the candidacy to the seat was set for 17 December 2018. Four candidates filed papers for running: journalist Andrea Frailis for the Centre-left coalition, Daniela Noli for the Centre-right coalition, councillor and engineer Luca Caschili for the Five Star Movement, and volleyball coach Enrico Balletto for CasaPound.

Noli and Balletto were making a second attempt at election to Parliament after missing out in the 2018 general elections: the former was nominated in second place on her list behind the elected Ugo Cappellacci in the plurinominal district of southern Sardinia, while the latter ran in the single-member district of Cagliari for the Senate of the Republic. Frailis, not affiliated to any party, competed with the support of the new "Progressives of Sardinia" coalition, formation created for the occasion, which unites both the Democratic Party and other formations, such as Free and Equal, that in Parliament formed the previous year two separate groups. Frailis has however announced that in the event of his election he would join the Democratic Party.

The election was characterised by a very low turnout, equal to 15.54%. The two most populous municipalities registered the highest and lowest turnout: Cagliari with 17.17% and Quartu Sant'Elena with 12.46%. Andrea Frailis, the candidate of the centre-left coalition, was elected deputy with 40.40% of the votes, while Daniele Caschili and Daniela Noli stopped respectively at 28.92% and 27.80%. Frailis received maximum votes only in the municipalities of Cagliari, Quartu Sant'Elena and Monserrato, namely the municipalities of the first belt of the city hinterland. These being the most populous municipalities, have determined the victory.

2019 Cagliari by-election
Party or coalition	Candidate	Votes	%	+/−
Centre-left	Andrea Frailis	15,581	40.46	+21.08
Five Star Movement	Luca Caschili	11,139	28.92	−10.14
Centre-right	Daniela Noli	10,707	27.80	−4.83
CasaPound	Enrico Balletto	1,083	2.81	+1.75
Total votes		38,510	100.00	—
Turnout		39,101	15.54	—
Centre-left gain from Five Star Movement				

=== Trentino-Südtirol 4: Trento ===
Map of the district.

On 22 October 2018, elections took place in Trentino to elect both the Governor and the Council of the Autonomous Province. Deputy Giulia Zanotelli of Cles was elected Councillor, and therefore, on 9 January 2019, she resigned from the seat at the Chamber of Deputies, triggering the by-election in the district for her replacement. Candidates of the Centre-right coalition (League, Forza Italia, Brothers of Italy), the Democratic Autonomist Alliance (Democratic Party, Future, Union for Trentino, Free and Equal, Federation of the Greens, Italian Socialist Party) and the Five Star Movement took part in the election, while the Trentino Tyrolean Autonomist Party did not file candidacies.

The by-election was held on 26 May 2019, in concurrence with another by-election in the district of Pergine, Trentino, and several other elections of the European Parliament (spanning from May 23 to May 26).

2019 Trento by-election
Party or coalition	Candidate	Votes	%	+/−
Centre-right	Martina Loss	46,224	46.06	+8.68
Centre-left	Giulia Merlo	41,290	41.14	+7.20
Five Star Movement	Lorenzo Leoni	12,846	12.80	–9.37
Total votes		100,360	100.00	—
Turnout		112,195	56.92	—
Centre-right hold				

=== Trentino-Südtirol 6: Pergine Valsugana ===
Map of the district.

On 22 October 2018, Deputy Maurizio Fugatti of Avio was elected as Governor of the Autonomous Province of Trentino; in consequence of that, he resigned from the Chamber of Deputies on 9 January 2019, in order to assume his new office. Candidates of the centre-right coalition (League, Forza Italia, Brothers of Italy), the Democratic Autonomist Alliance (Democratic Party, Futura, Union for Trentino, Free and Equal, Federation of the Greens, Italian Socialist Party) and the Five Star Movement took part in the election, while the Trentino Tyrolean Autonomist Party did not file candidacies.

The by-election was held on 26 May 2019, in concurrence with the other by-election in the district of Trento, Trentino, and with the several elections of the European Parliament (spanning from May 23 to May 26).

2019 Pergine by-election
Party or coalition	Candidate	Votes	%	+/−
Centre-right	Mauro Sutto	27,513	51.08	+6.52
Centre-left	Cristina Donei	19,386	35.99	+9.28
Five Star Movement	Rosa Rizzi	6,959	12.92	–10.05
Total votes		53,858	100.00	—
Turnout		59,691	51.36	—
Centre-right hold				
