= 2019 Fukuoka prefectural election =

← 2015	7 April 2019	2023 →

All 87 seats in the Fukuoka Prefectural Assembly 44 seats needed for a majority
- Turnout: 43.32% (▲2.44pp)
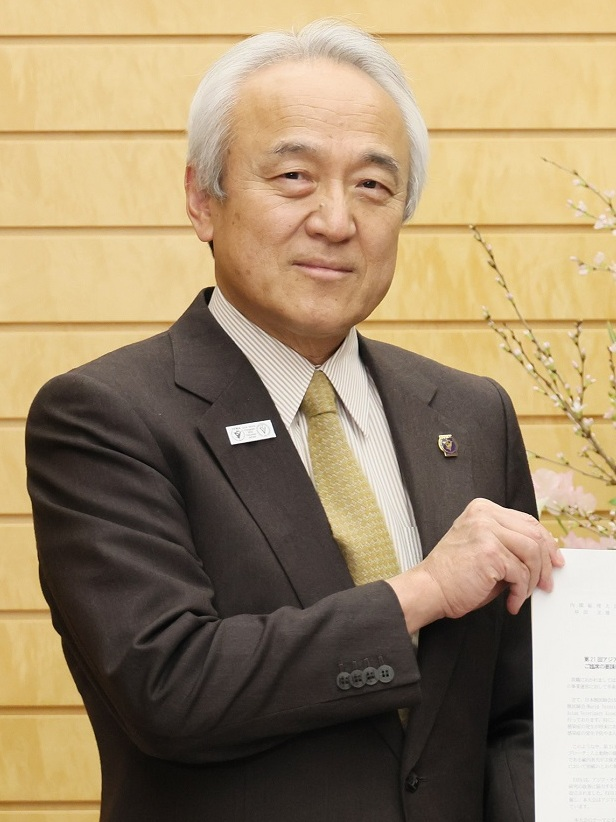

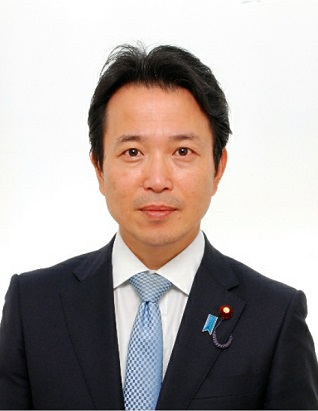
	First party	Second party
Leader	Isao Kurauchi	Toshio Yoshimura
Party	LDP	Democratic Party for the People
Last election	42	–
Seats won	40	12
Seat change	▼2	New
Popular vote	444,711	150,573
Percentage	37.80	12.80%
	Third party	Fourth party
Leader	Masakazu Hamachi	Koichi Yamauchi
Party	Komeito	CDP
Last election	11	–
Seats won	10	5
Seat change	▼1	New
Popular vote	130,278	60,416
Percentage	11.07%	5.14%
Governor before election
Hiroshi Ogawa
Independent
Elected Governor
Hiroshi Ogawa
Independent

Prefectural Assembly elections were held in Fukuoka Prefecture on 7 April 2019 to elect the members of Fukuoka Prefectural Assembly. The elections took place on the first voting day of the 2019 Japanese unified local elections.

== Background ==
The election was held in conjunction with the end of the four-year term of the members of Fukuoka Prefectural Assembly. It saw a total of 123 candidates running in 33 electoral districts, with 31 of the candidates running unopposed.

== Results ==
Party	Votes	%	Seats	+/–
Liberal Democratic Party	444,711	37.80	40	–2
Democratic Party for the People	150,573	12.80	12	New
Komeito	130,278	11.07	10	–1
Constitutional Democratic Party	60,416	5.14	5	New
Japanese Communist Party	52,095	4.43	2	0
Other parties	1,185	0.10	1	–
Independents	337,134	28.66	17	+5
Total	1,176,392	100.00	87	+1
Source: Government of Fukuoka Prefecture, NHK
