= 2019 Yamanashi gubernatorial election =

Japanese gubernatorial election

- 27 January 2019
- Turnout: 57.93 ▲16.08
Candidate	Kotaro Nagasaki	Hitoshi Goto
Party	LDP	CDP
Popular vote	198,047	166,666
Percentage	49.71%	41.84%
Governor before election
Hitoshi Goto
CDP
Elected Governor
Kotaro Nagasaki
LDP

The 2019 Yamanashi gubernatorial election was held on 27 January 2019 to elect the next governor of Yamanashi.

== Candidates ==
- Hitoshi Goto, incumbent, endorsed by CDP, DPFP. He was also backed by LDP and Komeito in 2015.
- Kotaro Nagasaki, former House of Representatives, endorsed by LDP and Komeito.
- Hitoshi Hanada, JCP.
- Harunobu Yonenaga, former upper house member for DPJ but went over to YP.

== Results ==
Yamanashi gubernatorial 2019
Party	Candidate	Votes	%	±%
LDP	Kotaro Nagasaki	198,047	49,71	n/a
CDP	Hitoshi Goto *	166,666	41,84	− 35,79
Independent	Harunobu Yonenaga	17,198	4,32	n/a
JCP	Hitoshi Hanada	16,467	4,13	− 13,33
Turnout		401,048	57.93	+16.08
Registered electors		692,976		
LDP gain from CDP		Swing		
