= 2019 Aomori gubernatorial election =

A gubernatorial election was held on 2 June 2019 to elect the next governor of Aomori.

== Candidates ==
- Shingo Mimura* back by LDP and Komeito.
- Wakako Sahara back by the opposition parties CDP, JCP, SDP, DPFP.

== Results ==
Aomori gubernatorial 2019
Party	Candidate	Votes	%	±%
LDP	Shingo Mimura	329,048	75,73	
CDP	Wakako Sahara	105,466	24,27	
Turnout		437,506	40.08	− 3.78
Registered electors		1 091 511		
LDP hold		Swing	n/a	
