= 2019 Tokushima gubernatorial election =

Local election in Japan

- 7 April 2019
- Turnout: 48.34% ▲7.71 pp

Candidate	Kamon Iizumi	Taiji Kishimoto
Party	Independent	Independent
Popular vote	158,972	122,779
Percentage	52.98%	40.92%
Supported by	LDP, Komeito, RENGO
Governor before election
Kamon Iizumi
Independent
Elected Governor
Kamon Iizumi
Independent

A gubernatorial election was held on 7 April 2019 to elect the next governor of Tokushima.

== Candidates ==
- Kamon Iizumi back by national LDP and Komeito.
- Atsushi Amou for the JCP.
- Taiji Kishimoto, ex-prefectoral MP, back by the local section of LDP.

== Results ==
Tokushima gubernatorial 2019
Party	Candidate	Votes	%	±%
Independent	Kamon Iizumi	158.972	52.98	− 27.27
Independent	Taiji Kishimoto	120.276	40.92	n/a
JCP	Atsushi Amou	18 332	6.11	− 13.64
Turnout		303,903	48.34	+ 7.71
Registered electors		628,726		
Independent hold		Swing	n/a	
