= 2019 Aichi prefectural election =

Election for prefectural assembly members held in 2019

- 7 April 2019

All 102 seats in the Aichi Prefectural Assembly 52 seats needed for a majority
- Turnout: 37.01% (▼1.49%)
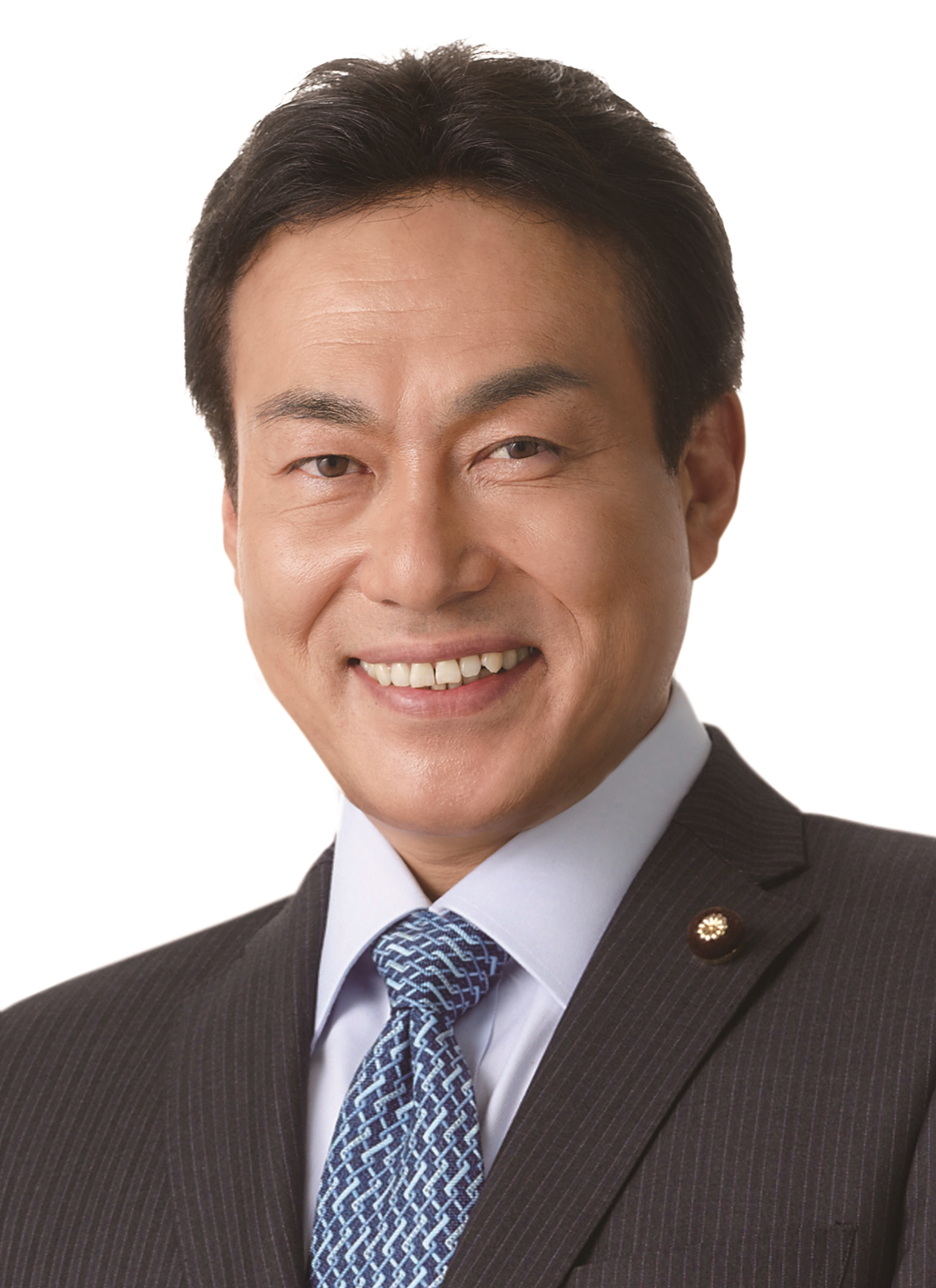

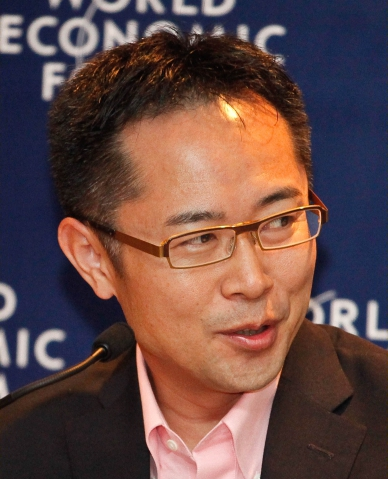

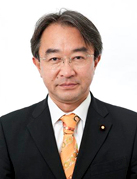

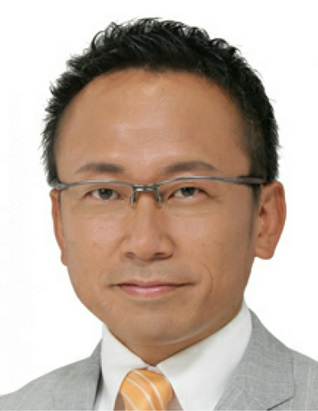
	First party	Second party
Leader	Masahito Fujikawa	Motohisa Furukawa
Party	Liberal Democratic	Democratic Party for the People
Seats before	56	9
Seats after	57	8
Seat change	▲1	▼1
Popular vote	606,349	81,057
Percentage	44.14%	5.90%
	Third party	Fourth party
Leader	Shoichi Kondo	Wataru Ito
Party	Constitutional Democratic	Komeito
Seats before	7	6
Seats after	7	6
Seat change	Steady	Steady
Popular vote	102,546	88,495
Percentage	7.46%	6.44%
- Post-election composition of the assembly by political party
Governor before election
Hideaki Ōmura
Independent
Elected Governor
Hideaki Ōmura
Independent

The 2019 Aichi Prefectural Assembly Election (Japanese: 2019年愛知県議会議員選挙, romanized: 2019-nen Aichi-ken Gikaigiin Senkyo) was held on 7 April to elect the 102 members of the Aichi Prefectural Assembly.

== Overview ==
The election was held as the current prefectural assembly members' four year-terms came to end. 138 candidates ran for 102 seats in 55 constituencies. 41 seats in 26 constituencies were elected without voting, as the candidates face no opposition. Voter turnout was 37.01%, marking the lowest record in four consecutive elections.

== Results ==
Election results
Party	Votes	Percentage	Seats	Change
Liberal Democratic Party	606,349	44.14%	57	▲1
Democratic Party For the People	81,057	5.90%	8	▼1
Constitutional Democratic Party	102,546	7.46%	7	Steady
Komeito	88,495	6.44%	6	Steady
Genzei Nippon	18,153	1.32%	1	▲1
Japanese Communist Party	96,918	7.06%	0	▼2
Japan Innovation Party	10,582	0.77%	0	Steady
Other parties	12,363	0.90%	0	Steady
Independent	357,265	26.01%	23	▲2
Total	1,373,728	100.00%	102	
