= 2014 Andhra Pradesh rural local bodies elections =

Elections to rural local bodies in Andhra Pradesh in 2014

2014 Andhra Pradesh rural local body elections
- 6 April 2014

1,096 Zilla Parishad Territorial constituencies (District panchayat); 16,589 Mandal Parishad Territorial constituencies (Block panchayat)

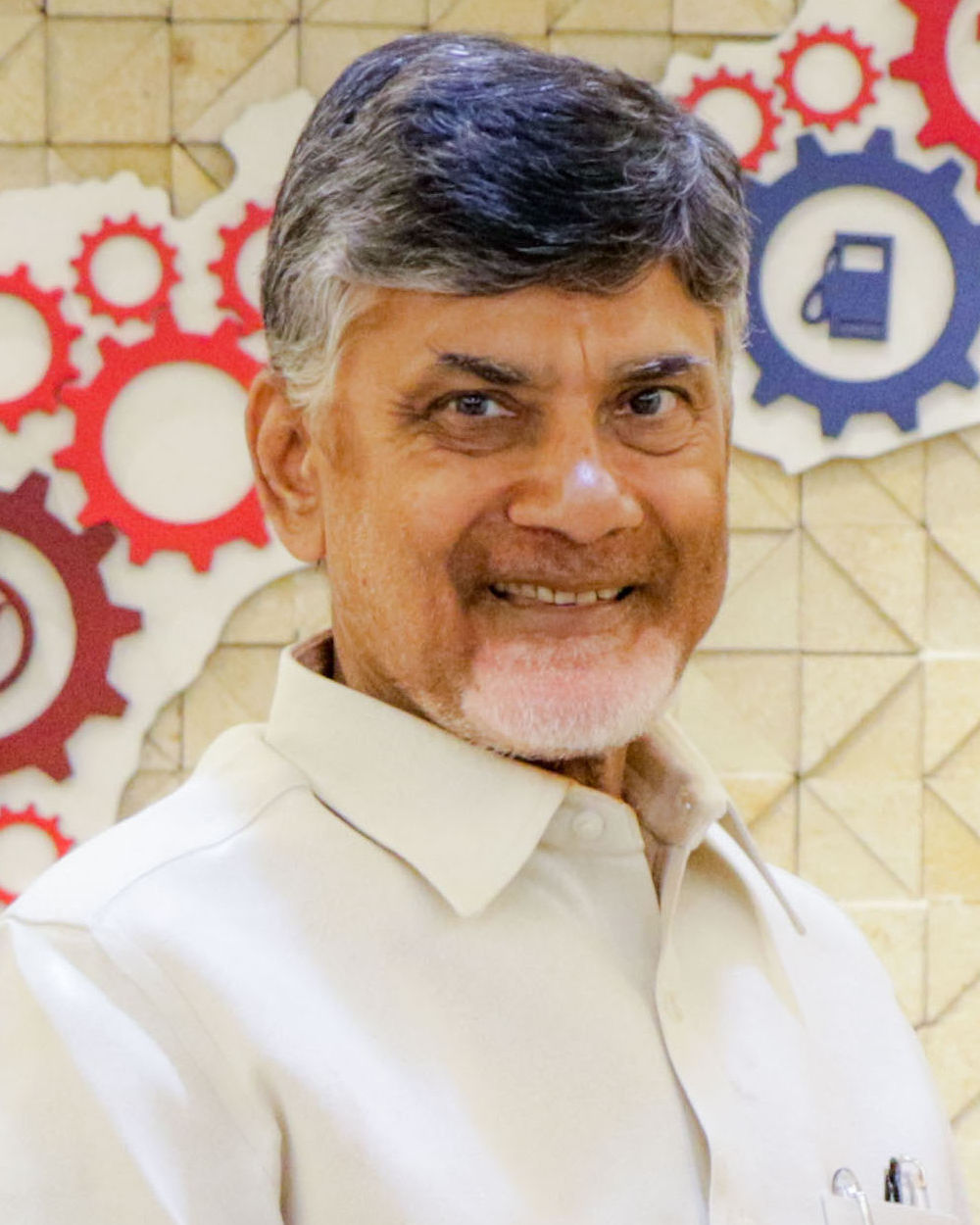

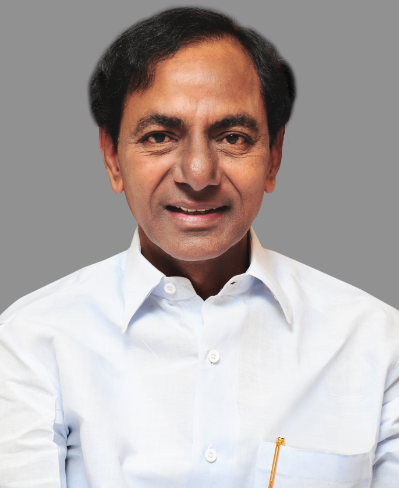

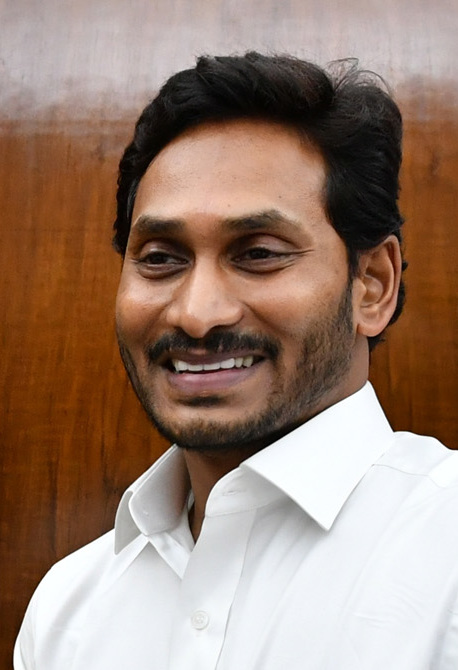
	First party	Second party
Leader	Raghu Veera Reddy & Ponnala Lakshmaiah	N. Chandrababu Naidu
Party	INC	TDP
ZPTC	178	426
ZPTC ±	TBC	TBC
MPTC	2,487	6,277
MPTC ±	TBC	TBC
	Third party	Fourth party
Leader	K. Chandrashekar Rao	Y. S. Jagan Mohan Reddy
Party	TRS	YSRCP
ZPTC	191	275
ZPTC ±	TBC	TBC
MPTC	1,860	4,199
MPTC ±	TBC	TBC

Elections to rural local bodies were held in the Indian state of Andhra Pradesh on 6 April 2014. These were the last elections to rural local bodies in the then united Andhra Pradesh before bifurcation into Andhra Pradesh and Telangana.

== Results ==
=== Results in Andhra Pradesh ===
Indirect elections

Sl.	Party	Symbol	ZPTC	MPTC	Total
1.	Indian National Congress		2	172	174
2.	Telugu Desam Party		373	5,216	5,589
3.	YSR Congress Party		275	4,199	4,474
4.	Others		3	505	508
Total			653	10,092	10,745

=== Results in Telangana ===
Indirect elections

Sl.	Party	Symbol	ZPTC	MPTC	Total
1.	Indian National Congress		176	2,315	2,491
2.	Telugu Desam Party		53	1,061	1,114
3.	Telangana Rashtra Samithi		191	1,860	2,051
4.	Others		23	1,251	1,274
Total			443	6,497	6,930

== See also ==
- 2019 Telangana rural local bodies elections
- 2021 Andhra Pradesh rural local bodies elections
