= 2019 Prague 9 by-election =

2019 Czech senate by-election
5 and 6 April 2019; 12 and 13 April 2019
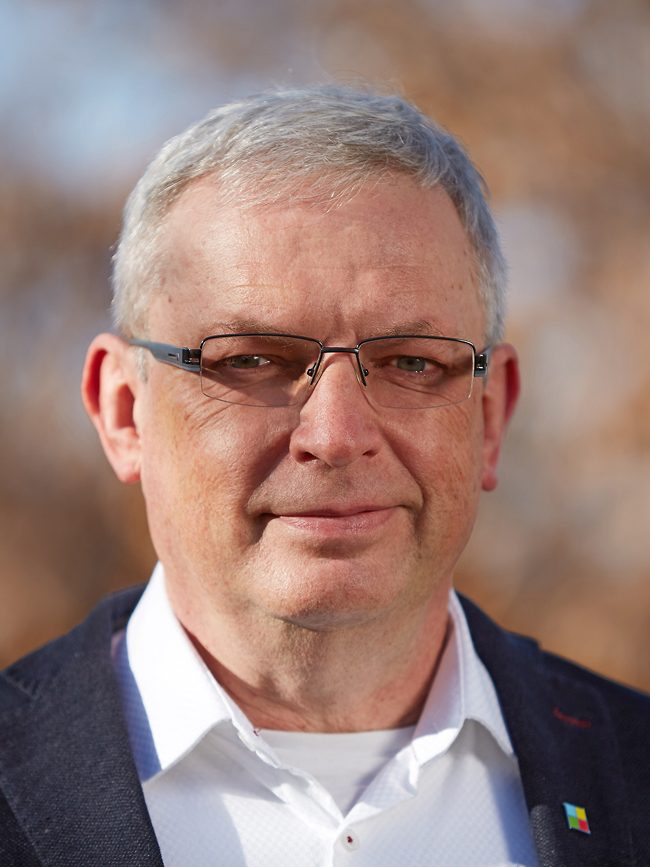

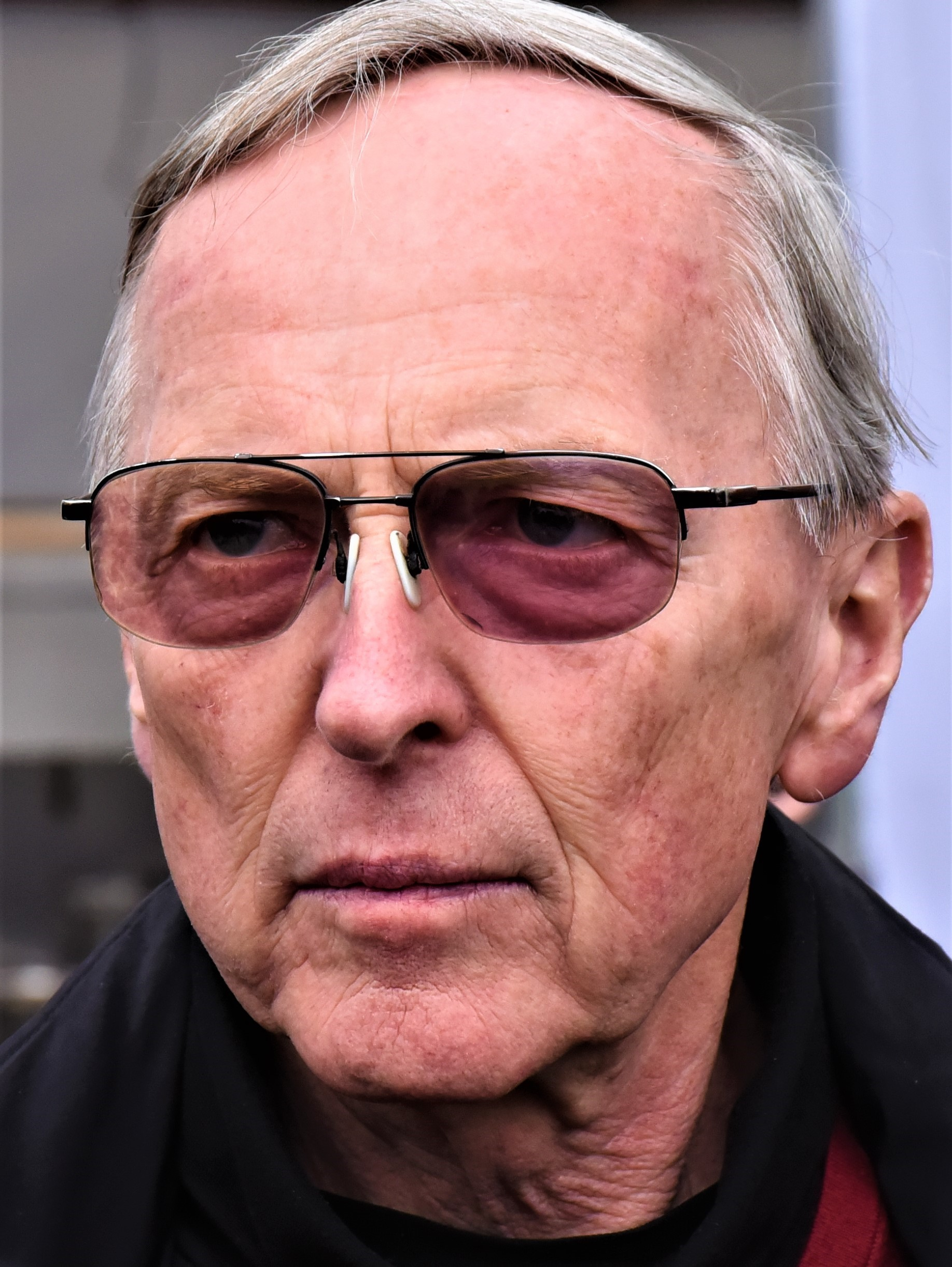
	First party	Second party
Candidate	David Smoljak	Jan Jarolím
Party	STAN	ODS
Popular vote	7,070	4,811
Percentage	59.5%	40.5%

A by-election was held in the Czech Republic on 5 and 6 April 2019 for the Prague 9 Senate seat. The incumbent Senator Zuzana Baudyšová, elected as a candidate of ANO 2011, announced her resignation on 29 January 2019 due to health problems. Jan Jarolím and David Smoljak advanced to the second round. Smoljak was eventually elected the new Senator.

== Background ==
The previous election was held in 2014, with Baudyšová elected the new Senator, nominated by ANO 2011. She resigned from the position on 29 January 2019, due to health difficulties. The new election was set for 5 and 6 April 2019.

Nominations closed on 18 February 2019, with ten candidates nominated. The Civic Democratic Party nominated Mayor of Prague 9 Jan Jarolím, who also received support from the Christian and Democratic Union – Czechoslovak People's Party. The Czech Pirate Party nominated local politician Petr Daubner, who was also endorsed by the Czech Social Democratic Party and the Green Party. Mayors and Independents nominated David Smoljak, a screenwriter and son of Ladislav Smoljak. TOP 09 nominated Martin Kroh. ANO 2011 nominated security specialist and lecturer Martin Hrubčík.

== Candidates ==
Candidate	Party	Notes
Petr Daubner	Czech Pirate Party	Local politician. Also supported by Czech Social Democratic Party, Green Party and Senator 21
Martin Hrubčík	ANO 2011	Chairman of Local ANO 2011.
Jan Jarolím	Civic Democratic Party	Mayor of Prague 9. Also supported by Christian and Democratic Union – Czechoslovak People's Party and Svobodní.
Jiří Koskuba	Czech Sovereignty	Former Social Democratic MP.
Martin Kroh	TOP 09	Chairman of Czech association for Housing Development
Libor Michálek	Vision for Czechia	Former Czech Pirate Party Senator
Pavel Pešan	Freedom and Direct Democracy	Free Citizens candidate during 2014 European Parliament election.
David Smoljak	Mayors and Independents	Screenwriter and supporter of the party.
Eva Syková	For Health and Sport	Scientist and former Senator
Petr Šimůnek	Communist Party of Bohemia and Moravia	Deputy Chairman of the Communist Party.

== Campaign ==
Petr Daubner announced his candidacy on 18 February 2019. He was nominated by the Czech Pirate Party and supported by Czech Social Democratic Party, Green Party and Senator 21. He stated that he would focus on defence of democracy and education.

David Smoljak announced his candidacy on 19 February 2019 as a nominee of Mayors and Independents. Former Senator Libor Michálek also announced his candidacy on 19 February 2019. He had previously served as a member of the Senate but was defeated in the 2018 election.

Mayor of Prague 9 Jan Jarolím announced his candidacy on 28 February 2019. He was nominated by the Civic Democratic Party and supported by Christian and Democratic Union – Czechoslovak People's Party and Svobodní. Jarolím stated that, if elected, he wanted to focus on the environment and support for municipalities.

Former Social Democratic Senator for Prague 4 Eva Syková, who was defeated in the 2018 Senate election, was a candidate for Prague 9 Senator as the nominee of For Health and Sport. She announced her candidacy on 27 February 2019.

Jan Jarolím and David Smoljak advanced to the second round.

== Opinion polls ==
=== Knowledge of candidates ===
Date	Agency	Jan Jarolím (ODS)	Libor Michálek (Vize)	David Smoljak (STAN)	Martin Kroh (TOP09)	Eva Syková (PZS)	Petr Daubner (Piráti)	Jiří Koskuba (ČS)	Martin Hrubčík (ANO)	Pavel Pešan (SPD)	Petr Šimůnek (KSČM)
25 March 2019	Phoenix Research	26%	22%	11%	8%	8%	6%	6%	5%	5%	3%

== Betting odds ==
Fortuna agency viewed Jan Jarolím as the frontrunner due to his results in the 2018 municipal election, during which he led ODS to a clear victory in Prague 9 district. Petr Daubner and Martin Hrubčík were viewed as his strongest opponents.

== Results ==
Candidate	Party	1st round		2nd round	
Jan Jarolím	Civic Democratic Party, Christian and Democratic Union – Czechoslovak People's Party	4,651	24.25	4,811	40.49
David Smoljak	Mayors and Independents	4,514	23.53	7,070	59.50
Petr Daubner	Czech Pirate Party, Czech Social Democratic Party, Green Party	2,674	13.94		
Martin Hrubčík	ANO 2011	2,391	12.46		
Martin Kroh	TOP 09	1.392	7.25		
Libor Michálek	Vision for Czechia	1,127	5.87		
Petr Šimůnek	Communist Party of Bohemia and Moravia	807	4.20		
Jiří Koskuba	Czech Sovereignty	678	3.53		
Pavel Pešan	Freedom and Direct Democracy	563	2.93		
Eva Syková	For Health and Sport	380	1.98		
Total valid votes		19 177	99.63	11,881	99.56
Invalid votes		72	0.37	52	0.44
Total		19,249	100	11,933	100
Registered voters/turnout		104,235	18.48	104,225	11.45
Source:Czech Statistical Bureau
