= 2019 Telangana local elections =

2019 Telangana rural local bodies elections
- 2019

12,571 gram panchayats; 538 Zilla Parishad Territorial constituencies (Zilla Parishad); 5,817 Mandal Parishad Territorial constituencies (Block Parishad)
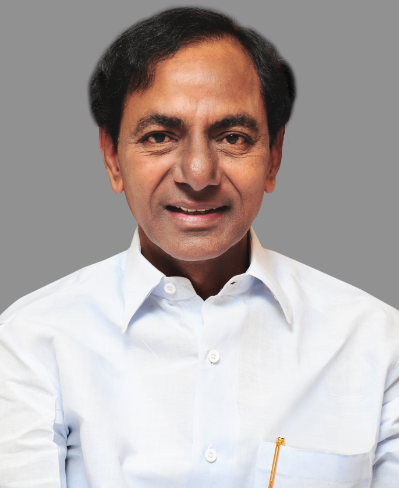

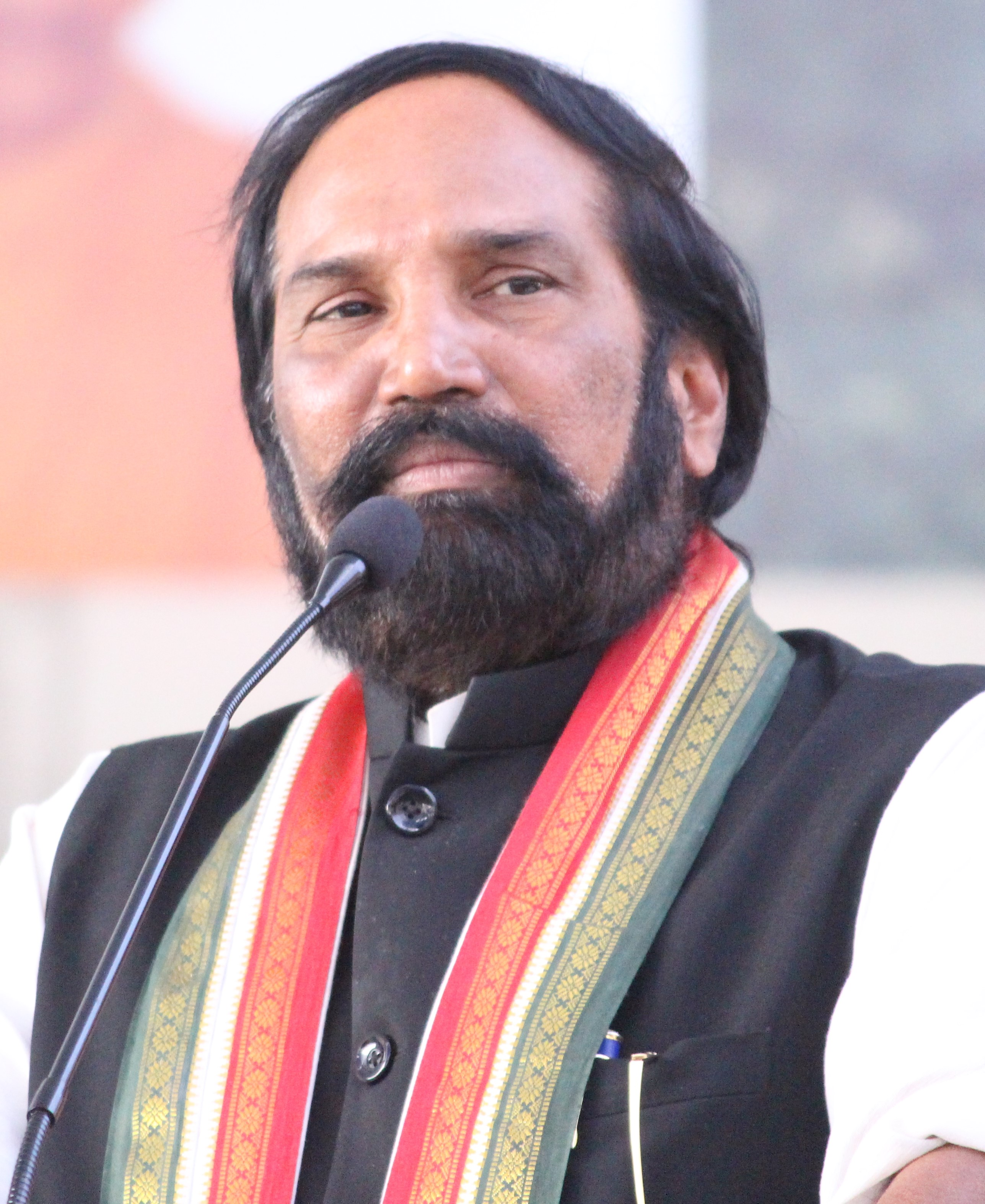

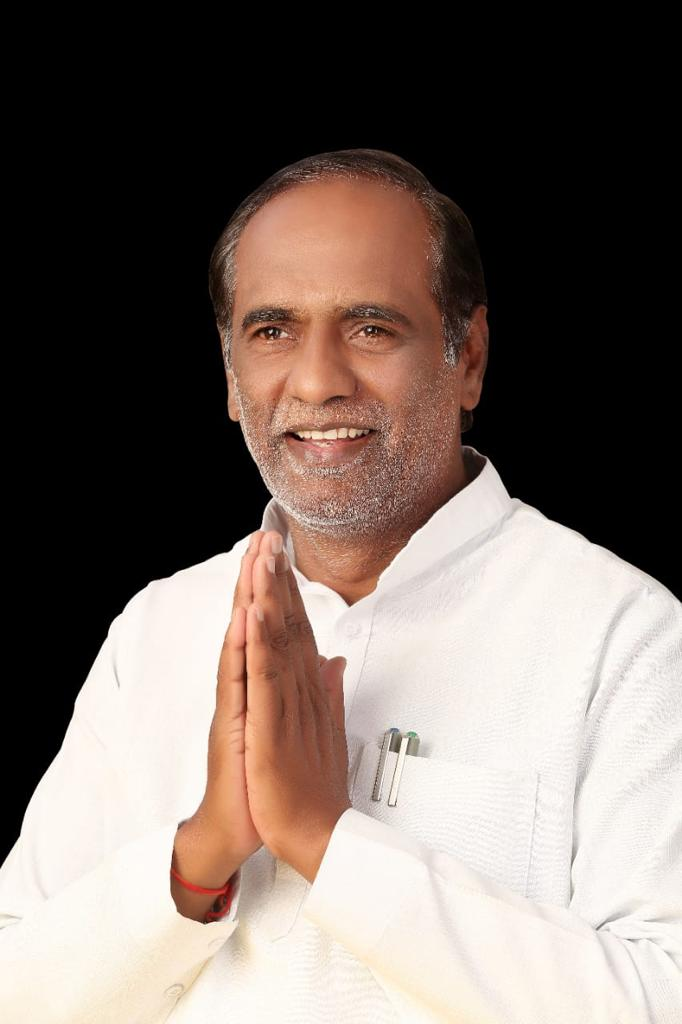
	First party	Second party	Third party
Leader	K. Chandrashekar Rao	N. Uttam Kumar Reddy	K. Laxman
Party	TRS	INC	BJP
GP	7,774	2,709	163
GP ±	▲6,139	▲40	TBC
ZPTC	446	75	8
ZPTC ±	▲255	▼102	TBC
MPTC	3,556	1,377	211
MPTC ±	▲1,672	▼934	TBC

Local elections were held in the Indian state of Telangana in 2019 for various rural local bodies including 12,751 gram panchayats, 538 Zilla Parishad territorial constituencies, and 5,817 Mandal Parishad territorial constituencies. Gram panchayat elections were held in January 2019 whereas ZPTC and MPTC elections were held in May 2019.

These were the first elections for almost 4,000 new panchayats created in 2018.

== Background ==
The previous Telangana rural local body elections had been held in united Andhra Pradesh in 2013 and 2014. The previous gram panchayat elections were held in 2013, in which the Indian National Congress won 2,669 gram panchayats (only counting the Telangana region), followed by Telugu Desam Party with 1,838 seats, and the Telangana Rashtra Samithi with 1,635 seats. In the elections for ZPTC and MPTC in 2014, the Congress won 176 ZPTCs and 2,315 MPTCs (only counting the Telangana region), followed by TRS with 191 ZPTCs and 1,860 MPTCs, and TDP with 53 ZPTCs and 1,061 MPTCs.

Local body elections in Telangana region (2013 and 2014)
Local body	INC	TRS	TDP	Oth
Gram Panchayat	2,669	1,635	1,838	TBC
Zilla Parishad territorial constituencies	176	191	53	23
Mandal Parishad territorial constituencies	2,315	1,860	1,061	1,251

== Results ==
The Telangana Rashtra Samithi swept the elections, winning over 60% of gram panchayats and MPTCs and over 80% of ZPTCs.

Local body elections in Telangana state (2019)
Local body	BRS	INC	BJP
Gram Panchayat	7,774	2,709	163
Zilla Parishad territorial constituencies	446	75	8
Mandal Parishad territorial constituencies	3,556	1,377	211

== See also ==
- 2014 Andhra Pradesh rural local bodies elections
- 2025 Telangana rural local bodies elections
- Elections in Telangana
