= 2019 Mie gubernatorial election =

A gubernatorial election was held on 7 April 2019 to elect the next governor of Mie.

== Candidates ==
- Eikei Suzuki* back by CDP, LDP, DPFP, SDP.
- Kanako Suzuki, back by the JCP.

== Results ==
Mie gubernatorial 2019
Party	Candidate	Votes	%	±%
LDP	Eikei Suzuki	615.281	89.70	+ 4.01
JCP	Kanako Suzuki	70.657	10.30	− 4.01
Turnout		693.558	46.68	−1.67
Registered electors		1,485,622		
LDP hold		Swing	n/a	
