= 2019 Fukui gubernatorial election =

A gubernatorial election was held on 7 April 2019 to elect the next governor of Fukui.

== Candidates ==
- Issei Nishikawa* back by CDP, individuals LDP, DPFP.
- Tatsuji Sugimoto, back by national LDP and NIK
- Yukie Kanemoto, back by the JCP and SDP.

== Results ==
Fukui gubernatorial 2019
Party	Candidate	Votes	%	±%
LDP	Tatsuji Sugimoto	220.774	59.30	n/a
CDP	Issei Nishikawa*	131.098	35.21	− 45.19
JCP	Yukie Kanemoto	20.462	5.50	− 14.10
Turnout		374.808	58.35	+ 9.76
Registered electors		642.323		
LDP hold		Swing	n/a	
