= 2019 Ecuadorian local elections =

Results of the provincial prefectures of the 2019 Ecuadorian local elections

The Ecuadorian local elections of 2019 were held on 24 March 2019 to designate: 23 prefects, 23 vice-prefects, 221 mayors, 867 urban councilors, 438 rural councilors, 4,089 main members of the parish councils, in parallel to the Elections of the Council of Citizen Participation and Social Control of Ecuador of 2019. In total, 11,069 authorities will be elected between principals and alternates (in the case of councillors, board members and CPCCS advisors).
