= 2019 Tamil Nadu local elections =

2019 Tamil Nadu local body elections
- 27 & 30 December 2019
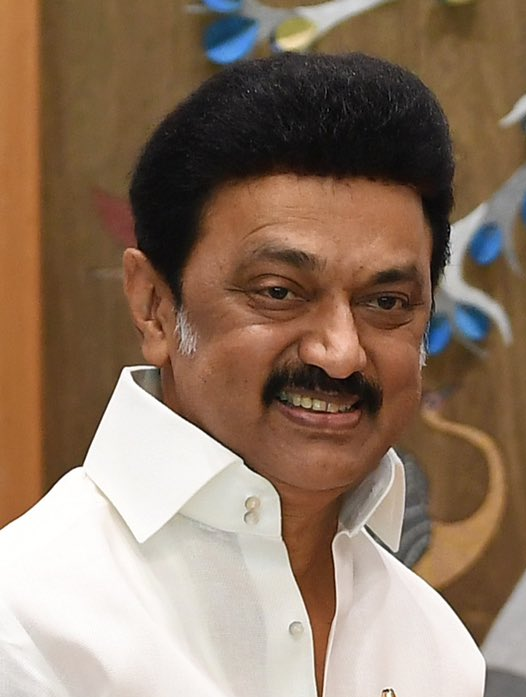

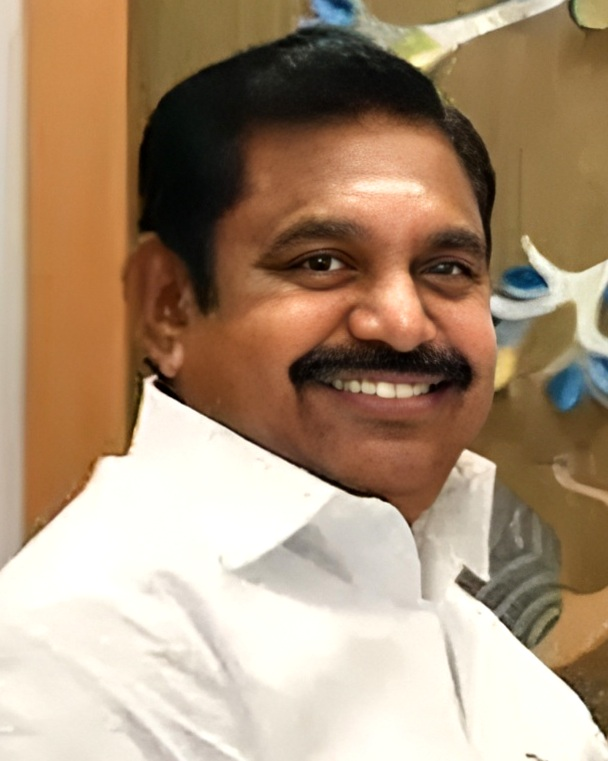
| | First party | Second party |
|---|---|---|
| Leader | M. K. Stalin | Edappadi K. Palaniswami |
| Party | DMK | AIADMK |
| Alliance | SPA | NDA |
| Leader since | 2018 | 2017 |
| Seats won | 2111 | 1797 |

== Election schedule ==
Phase 1 covers 156 Panchayat unions and Phase 2 covers 158 Panchayat unions across 27 districts in Tamil Nadu.

| Local Body Election Event | Date |
|---|---|
| Election Date Announcement | 09.12.2019 |
| Last Date for Filling Nominations | 16.12.2019 |
| Scrutiny | 17.12.2019 |
| Withdrawal Last Date | 19.12.2019 |
| Voting - Phase 1 | 27.12.2019 |
| Voting - Phase 2 | 30.12.2019 |
| Results | 02.01.2020 |

== Election results ==
Rural Local Body results
| Local Body/Party | District Panchayat Chairmen | District Panchayat Councillors | Panchayat Union Chairmen | Panchayat Union Councillor |
|---|---|---|---|---|
| DMK | 12 | 243 | 125 | 2111 |
| AIADMK | 13 | 214 | 140 | 1797 |
| PMK | 1 | 16 | 7 | 224 |
| CPI | 0 | 7 | 3 | 64 |
| BJP | 0 | 7 | 3 | 88 |
| INC | 0 | 13 | 5 | 132 |
| AMMK | 0 | 0 | 2 | 94 |
| CPI(M) | 0 | 2 | 0 | 33 |
| DMDK | 0 | 4 | 0 | 99 |
| MDMK | 0 | 2 | 0 | 20 |
| VCK | 0 | 1 | 0 | 8 |
| TMC(M) | 0 | 1 | 0 | 8 |
| NTK | 0 | 0 | 0 | 0 |
| Independent | 0 | 3 | 25 | 440 |
| Total seats faced election | 26 | 515 | 314 | 5090 |

- Corporation Mayor, Chairman of Municipalities and Town panchayat will be elected through in-direct election method.

i.e. The elected Councillors of the local bodies will elect the heads of the urban local bodies among-st themselves after the results.
