= 2019 Kanagawa gubernatorial election =

Sidebet_lytle

- 7 April 2019
- Turnout: 40.28 ▼0.43
Candidate	Yūji Kuroiwa	Makiko Kishi
Party	Independent	JCP
Popular vote	2,251,289	700,091
Percentage	76.28%	23.72%
Governor before election
Yūji Kuroiwa
Independent
Elected Governor
Yūji Kuroiwa
Independent

The 2019 Kanagawa gubernatorial election was held on 7 April 2019 to elect the next governor of Kanagawa. Incumbent Governor Yūji Kuroiwa was re-elected for a third term, defeating Makiko Kishi with 76.28% of the vote.

== Candidates ==
- Yūji Kuroiwa back by LDP, Komeito, DPFP.
- Makiko Kishi, back by the JCP and SDP.

The CDP decided to not supported the incumbent.

== Results ==
Kanagawa gubernatorial 2019
Party	Candidate	Votes	%	±%
LDP	Yūji Kuroiwa	2.251.289	76.28	− 0.45
JCP	Makiko Kishi	700.091	23.72	+ 0.45
Turnout		3.040.475	40.28	− 0.43
Registered electors		7.547.809		
LDP hold		Swing	0.45	
