= 2019 Kosovan local elections =

Local mayoral by-elections were held in the Kosovo municipalities of Leposavić, North Mitrovica, Zubin Potok, and Zvečan on 17 May 2019.

All four municipalities are predominantly Kosovo Serb communities in the northern part of Kosovo, on the border with Central Serbia. The incumbents mayors of each community had resigned in November 2018 in protest against the Government of Kosovo's imposition of a one hundred per cent tax on goods from Serbia. Both the Government of Serbia and the Serb List called for a high turnout from the Serb community.

== Results ==
The outcome of the elections was never in doubt, and the Serb List won without difficulty in all four communities.

=== Leposavić ===
Mayoral results
Candidate	Party	Votes	%
Zoran Todić	Serb List	7,296	96.70
Shaqir Hetemi	Democratic Party of Kosovo	144	1.91
Fisnik Veseli	Levizja Vetëvendosje!	105	1.39
Total		7,545	100.00

=== North Mitrovica ===
Mayoral results
Candidate	Party	Votes	%
Goran Rakić	Serb List	7,484	90.43
Gonxhe Çaushi	Democratic Party of Kosovo	461	5.57
Erden Atiq	Levizja Vetëvendosje!	331	4.00
Total		8,276	100.00

=== Zubin Potok ===
Mayoral results
Candidate	Party	Votes	%
Srđan Vulović	Serb List	4,075	94.59
Hysen Mehmeti	Democratic Party of Kosovo	123	2.86
Liridona Kahrimani	Levizja Vetëvendosje!	110	2.55
Total		4,308	100.00

=== Zvečan ===
Mayoral results
Candidate	Party	Votes	%
Vučina Janković	Serb List	3,847	94.75
Ilir Peci	Democratic Party of Kosovo	131	3.23
Avdi Peci	Levizja Vetëvendosje!	82	2.02
Total		4,060	100.00
