= Giulia Zanotelli =

Italian politician (born 1987)

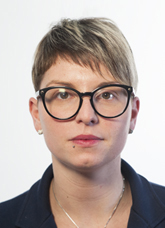
- Zanotelli in 2018

Member of the Chamber of Deputies
- In office 23 March 2018 – 9 January 2019
- Succeeded by: Martina Loss
- Constituency: Trentino-Alto Adige/Südtirol – U04

Personal details
- Born: 18 August 1987 (age 38)
- Party: Lega

Giulia Zanotelli (born 18 August 1987) is an Italian politician serving as vice president of Trentino-Alto Adige/Südtirol since 2024. From 2018 to 2019, she was a member of the Chamber of Deputies.
