= 2019 North Caribbean Coast Autonomous Region election =

2019 North Caribbean Coast Autonomous Region, Regional Council election
← 2014	3 March 2019

The eighth general election of the 45-seat Regional Council of the North Caribbean Coast, one of the two autonomous regions of Nicaragua, took place on 3 March 2019.

== Results ==
Party	Votes	%	Seats	+/–
Sandinista National Liberation Front	57,401	55.98	30	+2
YATAMA	25,915	25.27	12	+1
Constitutionalist Liberal Party	11,191	10.91	3	+2
Citizens for Liberty	4,673	4.56	0	-
Myatamaran	772	0.75	0	-
Independent Liberal Party	651	0.63	0	-5
Moskitia Pawanka	616	0.60	0	-
Multiethnic Indigenist Party	424	0.41	0	-
Nicaraguan Liberal Alliance	262	0.26	0	-
Alliance for the Republic	247	0.24	0	-
Conservative Party	219	0.21	0	-
Democratic Restoration Party	173	0.17	0	-
Total	102,544 votes	100	45	-
