= 2019 Saitama gubernatorial election =

A gubernatorial election was held on 2 June 2019 to elect the next governor of Saitama. Incumbent Governor Kiyoshi Ueda (former member of DPJ) declined to run for a fifth term. Motohiro Ōno, a former Upper House lawmaker and opposition candidate beat the candidate backed by the ruling LDP-Komeito coalition.

== Candidates ==
- Kenta Aoshima, backed by LDP and Komeito.
- Motohiro Ōno, backed by the opposition parties CDP, JCP, SDP, DPFP.
- Satoshi Hamada for the NHK Party.
- Nobuhiro Takeda.
- Shizue Sakurai.

== Results ==
Saitama gubernatorial 2019
Party	Candidate	Votes	%	±%
Independent	Motohiro Ōno (endorsed by CDP, DPFP, JCP, SDP)	923,482	47.87	new
Independent	Kenta Aoshima (endorsed by LDP, Kōmeitō)	866,021	44.89	new
Anti-NHK	Satoshi Hamada	64,182	3.33	n/a
Independent	Nobuhiro Takeda	40,631	2.11	−0.01
Independent	Shizue Sakurai	34,768	1.80	n/a
Turnout		1 955 274	32.31	+5.68
Registered electors		6,052,272		
