= 2019 Hyogo prefectural election =

← 2015	7 April 2019	2023 →

All 86 seats in the Hyogo Prefectural Assembly 44 seats needed for a majority
- Turnout: 32.56%
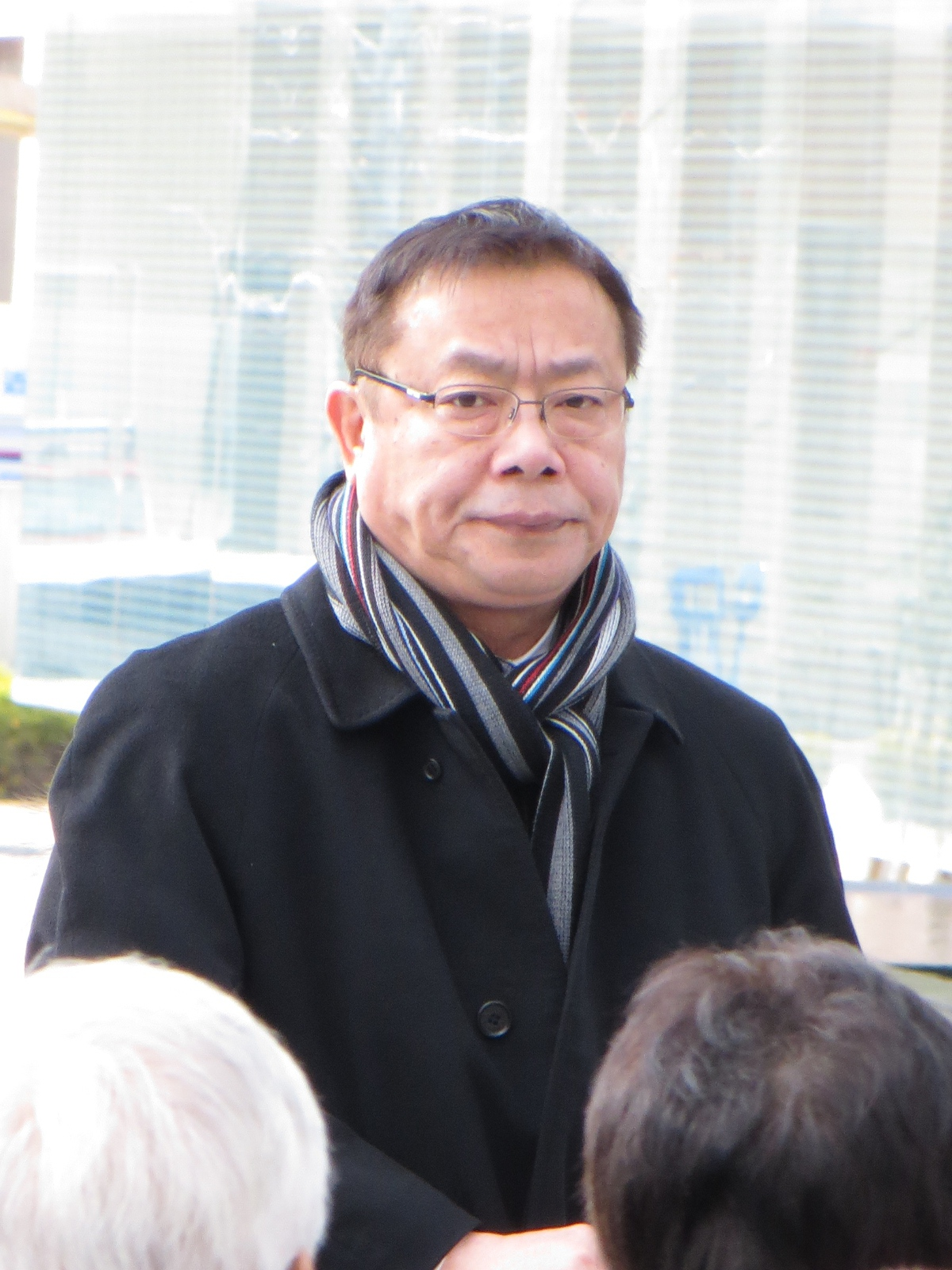

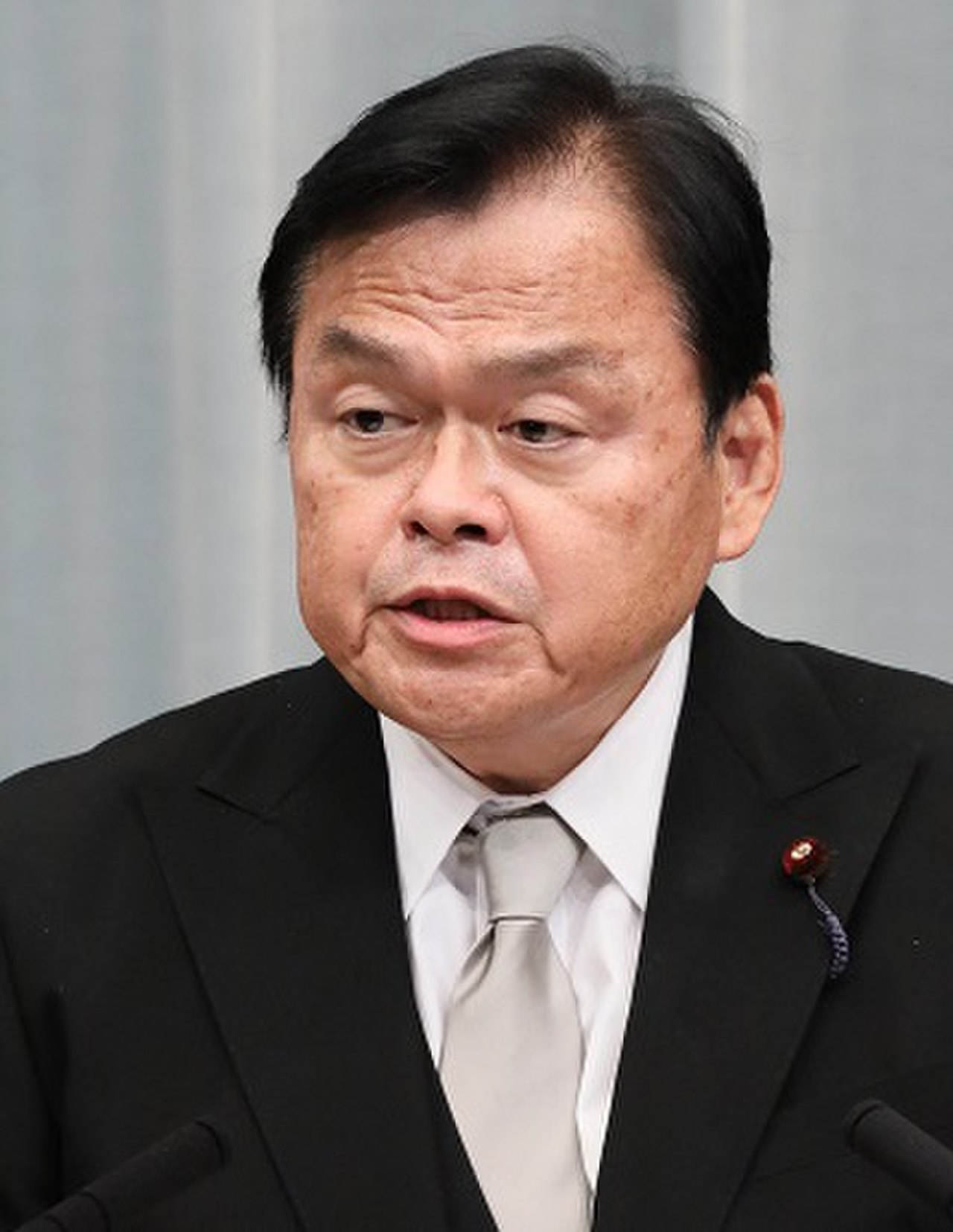

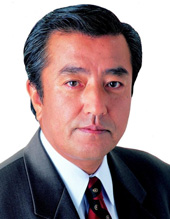
	First party	Second party	Third party
Leader	Koichi Tani	Kazuyoshi Akaba	Kunihiko Muroi
Party	LDP	Komeito	Ishin
Seats won	27	12	9
Seat change	▼13	▼1	Steady
Popular vote	386,471	196,653	7,604
Percentage	26.61%	13.54%	0.52%
Governor before election
Toshizō Ido
Independent
Elected Governor
Toshizō Ido
Independent

Prefectural elections was held in Hyōgo Prefecture on 7 April 2019 to elect the members of Hyogo Prefectural Assembly. The elections took place on the first day of the 2019 Japanese unified local elections.

== Overview ==
The election was held as the members of the prefectural assembly reached the end of their term in office. A total of 112 candidates ran for the 86 seats in 39 constituencies, with candidates in 15 of the races running unopposed.

== Results ==
Party	Votes	%	Seats	+/–
Liberal Democratic Party	386,471	26.61	27	–13
Komeito	196,653	13.54	12	–1
Nippon Ishin no Kai	157,414	10.84	9	0
Japanese Communist Party	156,355	10.76	5	0
Constitutional Democratic Party	111,160	7.65	5	New
Democratic Party for the People	29,414	2.02	1	New
Japan Restoration Party	7,604	0.52	0	New
Independents	407,516	28.05	27	+20
Total	1,452,587	100.00	86	–1
Source: Jichisoken
