= 2019 Ascension general election =

General elections were held on Ascension Island on 26 September 2019 to elect the Island Council, following the dissolution of the previous Council on 1 September. Seven candidates ran for five available Councillor positions.

== Electoral system ==
The Island Council consists of either five or seven elected members, depending on the number of candidates. If there are eight or more candidates, seven members would be elected; if there were fewer than eight candidates, only five would be elected. With only seven candidates running, five seats were available.

The five seats were elected for three years terms by plurality-at-large voting. Voters were able to cast up to five votes.

== Results ==
Candidate	Votes	%	Notes
Keturah Viola George	105	21.08	Re-elected
Alan Herbert Nicholls	83	16.67	Elected
Katharyn Sarah Chadwick	73	14.66	Elected
Andrew Robert Ellick	68	13.65	Elected
Andrew Cansfield Hobson	64	12.85	Elected
Kristopher Edward Hall	60	12.05	
Iain Courtney Lamb	45	9.04	
Total	498	100.00	
Total votes	150	–	
Registered voters/turnout	518	28.96	
Source: Government of Ascension Island
