= 2019 Ōita gubernatorial election =

Japanese prefectural election

- 7 April 2019
- Turnout: 47.41
Candidate	Katsusada Hirose	Kai Yamashita
Party	Independent	Independent
Popular vote	360,246	66,502
Percentage	80.69%	14.90%
Governor before election
Katsusada Hirose
Independent
Elected Governor
Katsusada Hirose
Independent

The 2019 Ōita gubernatorial election was held on 7 April 2019 to elect the next governor of Ōita.

== Candidates ==
- Katsusada Hirose back by national LDP and Komeito.
- Kai Yamashita for the JCP.
- Yoshiko Shutō.

== Results ==
Ōita gubernatorial 2019
Party	Candidate	Votes	%	±%
LDP	Katsusada Hirose	360 246	80.69	
JCP	Kai Yamashita	66 502	14.90	
Independent	Yoshiko Shutō	19 701	4.41	n/a
Turnout		454 366	47.41	
Registered electors		958 341		
LDP hold		Swing	n/a	
