= 2019 Gunma gubernatorial election =

← 2015	21 July 2019	2023 →
- Turnout: 48.51 ▲17.15%
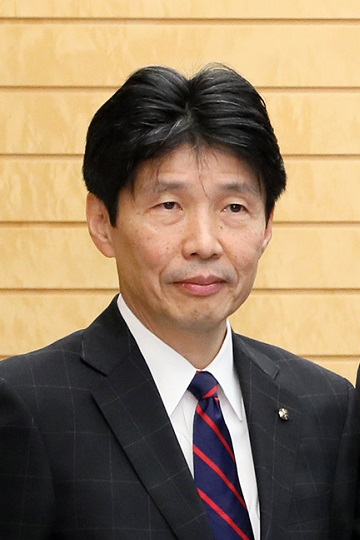

Candidate	Ichita Yamamoto	Kiyoto Ishida
Party	Independent	Independent
Popular vote	576.935	185.959
Percentage	75.62%	24.38%
Supported by	LDP, Komeito	JCP
Governor before election
Masaaki Ōsawa
Independent
Elected Governor
Ichita Yamamoto
Independent

The 2019 Gunma gubernatorial election was held on 21 July 2019 to elect the next governor of Gunma.

== Candidates ==
- Ichita Yamamoto back by LDP and Komeito. He is a former MP for LDP.
- Kiyoto Ishida, back by the JCP. He is a former teacher union leader.

== Results ==
Gunma gubernatorial 2019
Party	Candidate	Votes	%	±%
LDP	Ichita Yamamoto	576.935	75.62	+2.20
JCP	Kiyoto Ishida	185.959	24.38	− 2.20
Turnout		784.724	48.51	+17.15
Registered electors		1.619.662		
LDP hold		Swing	+2.20	
