= 2019 Dallas municipal election =

- May 4, 2019

The 2019 Dallas municipal election was an election to determine the mayor and all 14 city council members in Dallas, Texas. The election day was May 4, 2019 If no candidate takes a majority of over 50% of the total vote, the two top vote-earners will advance to a runoff election on June 8. Incumbent mayor Mike Rawlings is unable to run for reelection due to term limits.

== Mayor ==
2019 Dallas mayoral election
- May 4, 2019
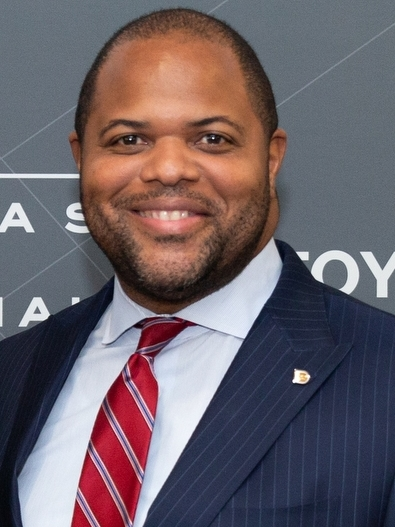

Nominee	Eric Johnson	Scott Griggs
Party	Nonpartisan	Nonpartisan
First round vote	16,374	14,901
First round percentage	20.31%	18.48%
Runoff vote	41,208	32,898
Runoff percentage	55.61%	44.39%
Mayor before election
Mike Rawlings
Democratic
Elected Mayor
Eric Johnson
Democratic

=== Results ===
Dallas mayoral election results, 2019
Party	Candidate	Votes	%
Nonpartisan	Eric Johnson	16,374	20.31
Nonpartisan	Scott Griggs	14,901	18.48
Nonpartisan	Lynn McBee	11,309	14.03
Nonpartisan	Mike Ablon	10,859	13.47
Nonpartisan	Miguel Solis	8,640	10.72
Nonpartisan	Regina Montoya	8,428	10.45
Nonpartisan	Jason Villalba	5,440	6.75
Nonpartisan	Albert Black	4,205	5.22
Nonpartisan	Alyson Kennedy	469	0.58
Total votes		80,625	100

Dallas mayoral runoff election results, 2019
Party	Candidate	Votes	%
Nonpartisan	Eric Johnson	41,208	55.61
Nonpartisan	Scott Griggs	32,898	44.39
Total votes		74,106	100

== District 1 ==
Candidate	Votes	Percentage
Chad West	3,250	55%
Giovanni Gio Valderas	2,067	35%
Sylvana Alonzo	535	9%
Jeremy T. Boss	107	2%

== District 2 ==
Candidate	Votes	Percentage
Adam Medrano	2,455	76%
Barbara Coombs	532	17%
Paul A. Freeman	227	7%

== District 3 ==
Candidate	Votes	Percentage
Casey Thomas II	3,029	69.3%
Charletta Rogers Compton	416	9.5%
Denise Benavides	368	8.4%
Britannica Scott	308	7.0%
Davante Peters	248	5.7%

== District 4 ==
Candidate	Votes	Percentage
Carolyn King Arnold	2,005	53%
Dawn Blair	1,801	47%

== District 5 ==
Candidate	Votes	Percentage
Jaime Resendez	1,084	52%
Yoland Faye Williams	775	37%
Ruth Torres	221	11%

== District 6 ==
Candidate	Votes	Percentage
Omar Narvaez	1,456	59%
Monica R. Alonzo	821	33%
Tony Carrillo	187	8%

== District 7 ==
Candidate	Votes	Percentage
Adam Bazaldua	2,137	51%
Tiffinni A. Young	2,046	49%

== District 8 ==
Candidate	Votes	Percentage
Tennell Atkins	2,184	70%
Erik Wilson	918	30%

== District 9 ==
Candidate	Votes	Percentage
Paula Blackmon	4,645	52%
Erin Moore	4,268	48%

== District 10 ==
Candidate	Votes	Percentage
Adam McGough	5,505	77%
D'Andrala Dede Alexander	1,423	20%
Sirrano Keith Baldeo	191	3%

== District 11 ==
Candidate	Votes	Percentage
Lee K. Kleinman	4,467	78%
Curtis T. Harris	1,281	22%

== District 12 ==
Candidate	Votes	Percentage
Cara Mendelsohn	3,290	59%
Carolyn Cookie Peadon	1,612	29%
Daniel Powell	648	12%

== District 13 ==
Candidate	Votes	Percentage
Jennifer Staubach Gates	8,927	66%
Laura Miller	4,607	34%

== District 14 ==
Candidate	Votes	Percentage
David Blewett	4,437	48%
Philip T. Kingston	3,761	40%
Warren Ernest Johnson	1,116	12%
