= 2019 Iwate gubernatorial election =

← 2015	8 September 2019	2023 →
- Turnout: 53.47%
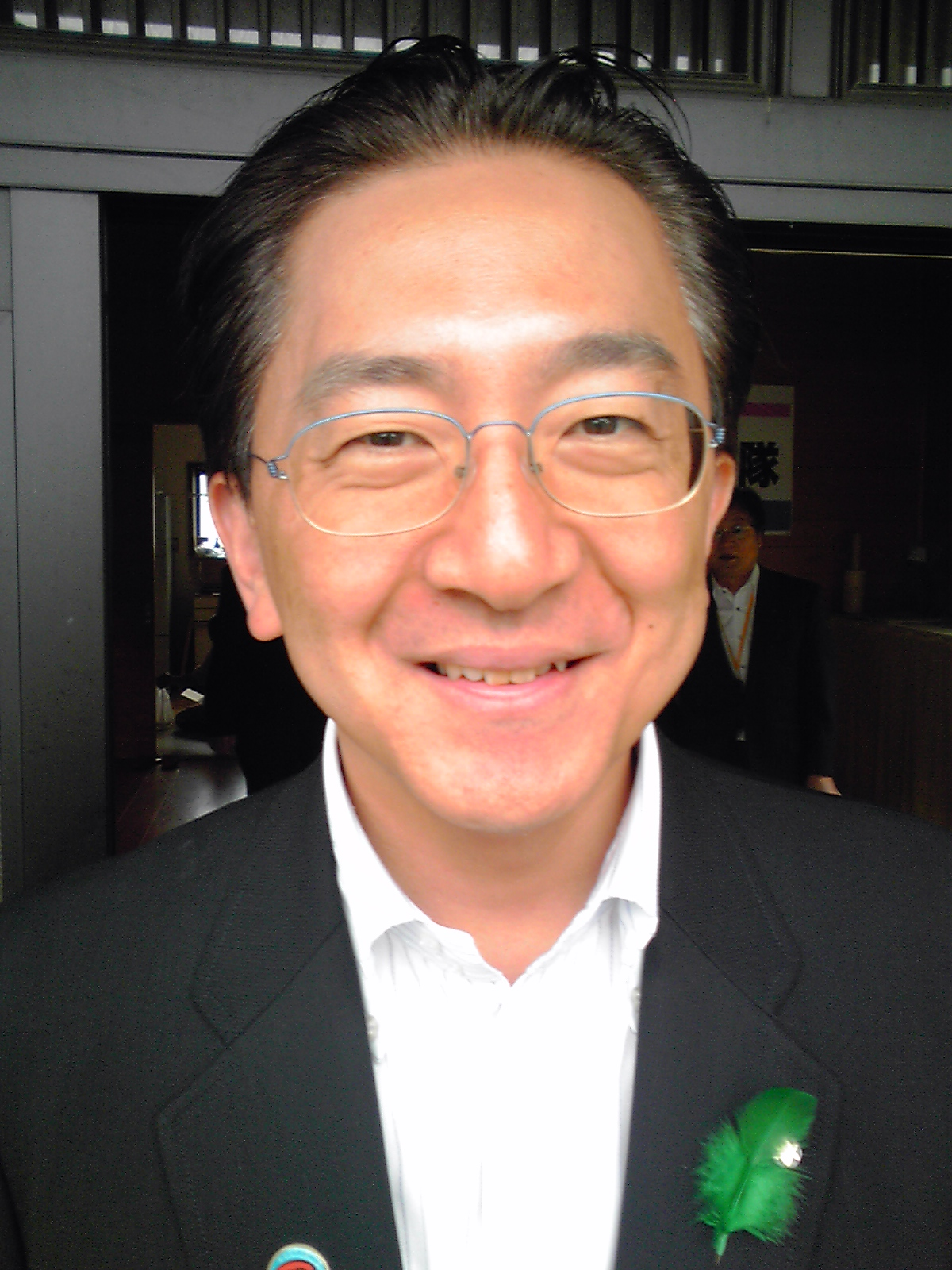

Candidate	Takuya Tasso	Atsushi Oikawa
Party	Independent	Independent
Popular vote	402,803	155,504
Percentage	72.15%	27.85%
Supported by	CDP, JCP, SDP, DPFP	LDP, Komeito
Governor before election
Takuya Tasso
Independent
Elected Governor
Takuya Tasso
Independent

The 2019 Iwate gubernatorial election was held on 8 September 2019 to elect the next governor of Iwate.

== Candidates ==
- Takuya Tasso*, backed by the opposition parties CDP, JCP, SDP, DPFP.
- Atsushi Oikawa back by LDP and Komeito. He is a former local assemblyman for LDP.

== Results ==
Iwate gubernatorial 2019
Party	Candidate	Votes	%	±%
Democratic Party for the People	Takuya Tasso*	402,803	72.15	− 27.85
LDP	Atsushi Oikawa	155,504	27.85	n/a
Turnout		562 412	53.47	− 6.46
Registered electors		1 051 931		
Democratic Party for the People hold		Swing	-27.85	
