= 2019 Aichi gubernatorial election =

- 3 February 2019
- Turnout: 35.51 ▲0.58
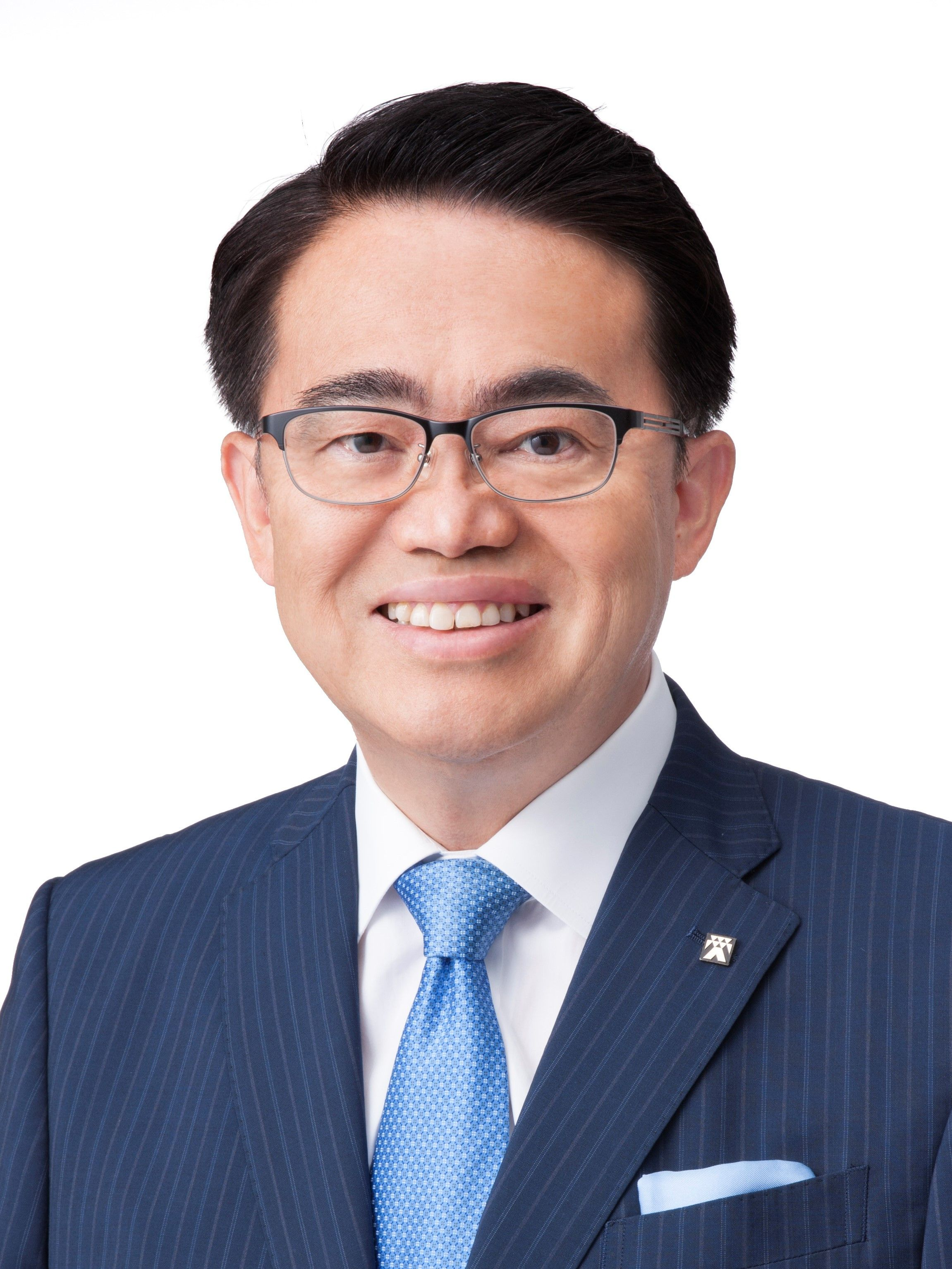
Candidate	Hideaki Omura	Saichi Kurematsu
Party	Independent	JCP
Popular vote	1,774,763	355,311
Percentage	83.32%	16.68%
Governor before election
Hideaki Omura
Independent
Elected Governor
Hideaki Omura
Independent

The 2019 Aichi gubernatorial election was held on 3 February 2019 to elect the Governor of Aichi. Incumbent Governor Hideaki Omura was re-elected for a third term, defeating Saichi Kurematsu with 83.32% of the vote.

== Candidates ==
- Hideaki Omura, incumbent, endorsed by LDP, Komeito, CDP.
- Saichi Kurematsu, JCP.

== Results ==
Aichi gubernatorial 2019
Party	Candidate	Votes	%	±%
LDP	Hideaki Omura	1,774,763	83,32	+2.72
JCP	Saichi Kurematsu	355,311	16,68	
Turnout		2.175.000	35.51	+0.58
Registered electors		6.124.636		
LDP hold		Swing		
