= 2019 Saitama prefectural election =

Election for prefectural assembly members held in 2019

← 2015	7 April 2019	2023 →

All 93 seats in the Saitama Prefectural Assembly 47 seats needed for a majority
- Turnout: 35.52% (▼2.16%)
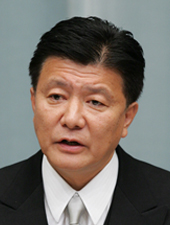

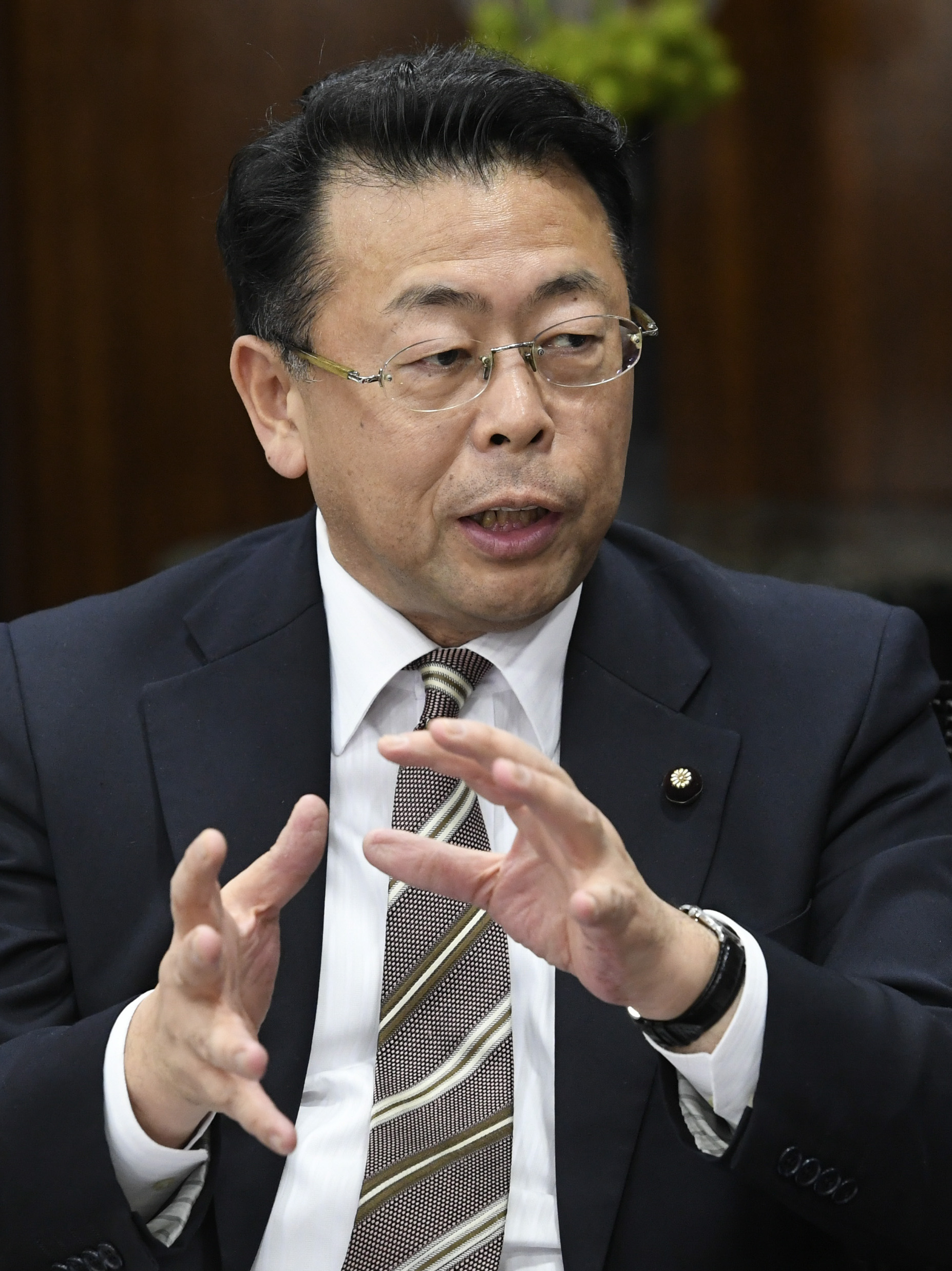

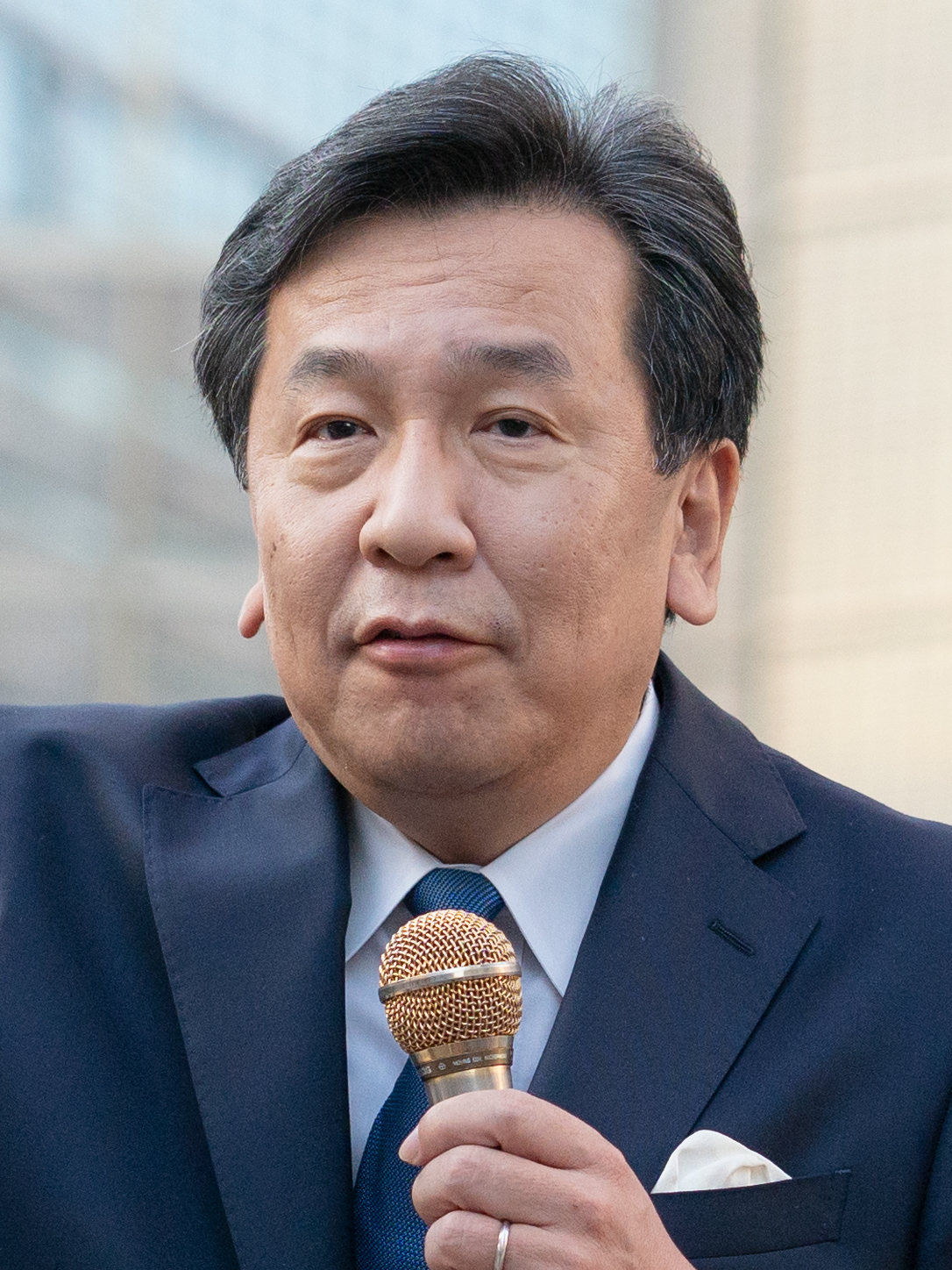
	First party	Second party
Leader	Yoshitaka Shindō	Makoto Nishida
Party	Liberal Democratic	Komeito
Seats before	51	8
Seats after	48	9
Seat change	▼3	▲1
Popular vote	644,222	177,099
Percentage	40.50%	11.13%
	Third party	Fourth party
Leader	Yukio Edano	Hatsuo Hagiwara
Party	Constitutional Democratic	Communist
Seats before	5	5
Seats after	7	6
Seat change	▲2	▲1
Popular vote	127,008	193,130
Percentage	7.98%	12.14%
- Post-election composition of the assembly by political parties
Governor before election
Kiyoshi Ueda
Independent
Elected Governor
Kiyoshi Ueda
Independent

The 2019 Saitama Prefectural Assembly Election (Japanese: 2019年埼玉県議会議員選挙, romanized: 2019-nen Saitama-ken Gikaigiin Senkyo) was held on 7 April to elect the 93 members of the Saitama Prefectural Assembly.

== Overview ==
The election was held due to the end of the current prefectural assembly members' terms. A total of 129 candidates ran for 93 seats in 52 electoral districts. 32 elections in 22 electoral districts saw no voting, as the candidates ran unopposed.

== Results ==
Election results
Party	Votes	Percentage	Seats	Change
Liberal Democratic Party	644,222	40.50%	48	▼3
Komeito	177,099	11.13%	9	▲1
Constitutional Democratic Party	127,008	7.98%	7	▲2
Japanese Communist Party	193,130	12.14%	6	▲1
Democratic Party For the People	97,958	6.16%	4	▲1
Party of Hope	4,924	0.31%	0	Steady
Other parties	10,127	0.64%	1	▲1
Independent	336,343	21.14%	18	▲7
Total	1,590,811	100.00%	93	
