= 2019 Kanagawa prefectural election =

Election for prefectural assembly members held in 2019

- 7 April 2019

All 105 seats in the Kanagawa Prefectural Assembly 53 seats needed for a majority
- Turnout: 41.16% (▼0.65%)
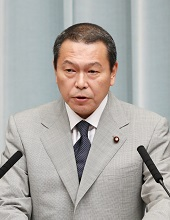

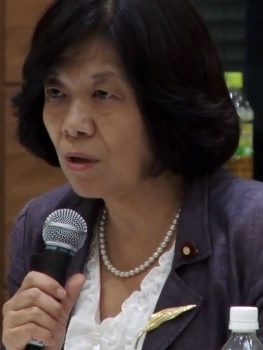

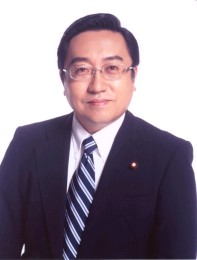
	First party	Second party
Leader	Hachiro Okonogi	Tomoko Abe
Party	Liberal Democratic	CDP
Seats before	44	11
Seats after	47	23
Seat change	▲3	▲12
Popular vote	1,051,998	446,843
Percentage	42.80%	18.18%
	Third party	Fourth party
Leader	Isamu Ueda	Satoru Tamogami
Party	Komeito	Communist
Seats before	10	6
Seats after	8	5
Seat change	▼2	▼1
Popular vote	118,827	194,986
Percentage	4.83%	7.93%
- Post-election composition of the assembly by political party
Governor before election
Yūji Kuroiwa
Independent
Elected Governor
Yūji Kuroiwa
Independent

The 2019 Kanagawa Prefectural Assembly Election (Japanese: 2019年神奈川県議会議員選挙, romanized: 2019-nen Kanagawa-ken Gikaigiin Senkyo) was held on 7 April 2019 to elect the 105 members of the Kanagawa Prefectural Assembly.

== Overview ==
The 105 seats of the Kanagawa Prefectural Assembly are up for election every four years. For the 2019 election, 154 candidates ran for the 105 seats in 48 electoral districts. A total of 13 electoral districts saw no voting as the candidates in these elections face no opposition.

== Results ==
Election results
Party	Votes	Percentage	Seats	Change
Liberal Democratic Party	1,051,998	42.80%	47	▲3
Constitutional Democratic Party	446,843	18.18%	23	▲12
Komeito	118,827	4.83%	8	▼2
Japanese Communist Party	194,986	7.93%	5	▼1
Democratic Party For the People	158,849	6.46%	5	▼3
Kanagawa Network Movement	42,325	1.72%	1	Steady
Party of Hope	19,094	0.78%	0	Steady
Liberal Party	6,262	0.25%	0	Steady
Other parties	12,099	0.49%	0	Steady
Independent	406,791	16.55%	16	▼4
Total	2,458,074	100.00%	105	
