= 2019 Okayama prefectural election =

Election for prefectural assembly members held in 2019

← 2015	7 April 2019	2023 →

All 55 seats in the Okayama Prefectural Assembly 28 seats needed for a majority
- Turnout: 42.30% (▼2.49%)
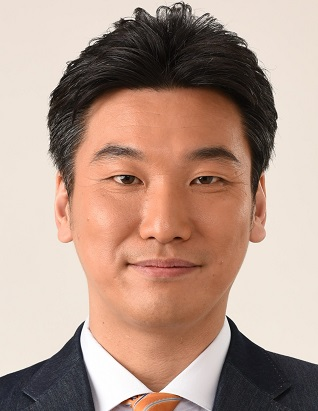

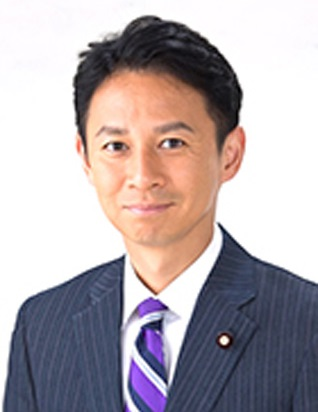

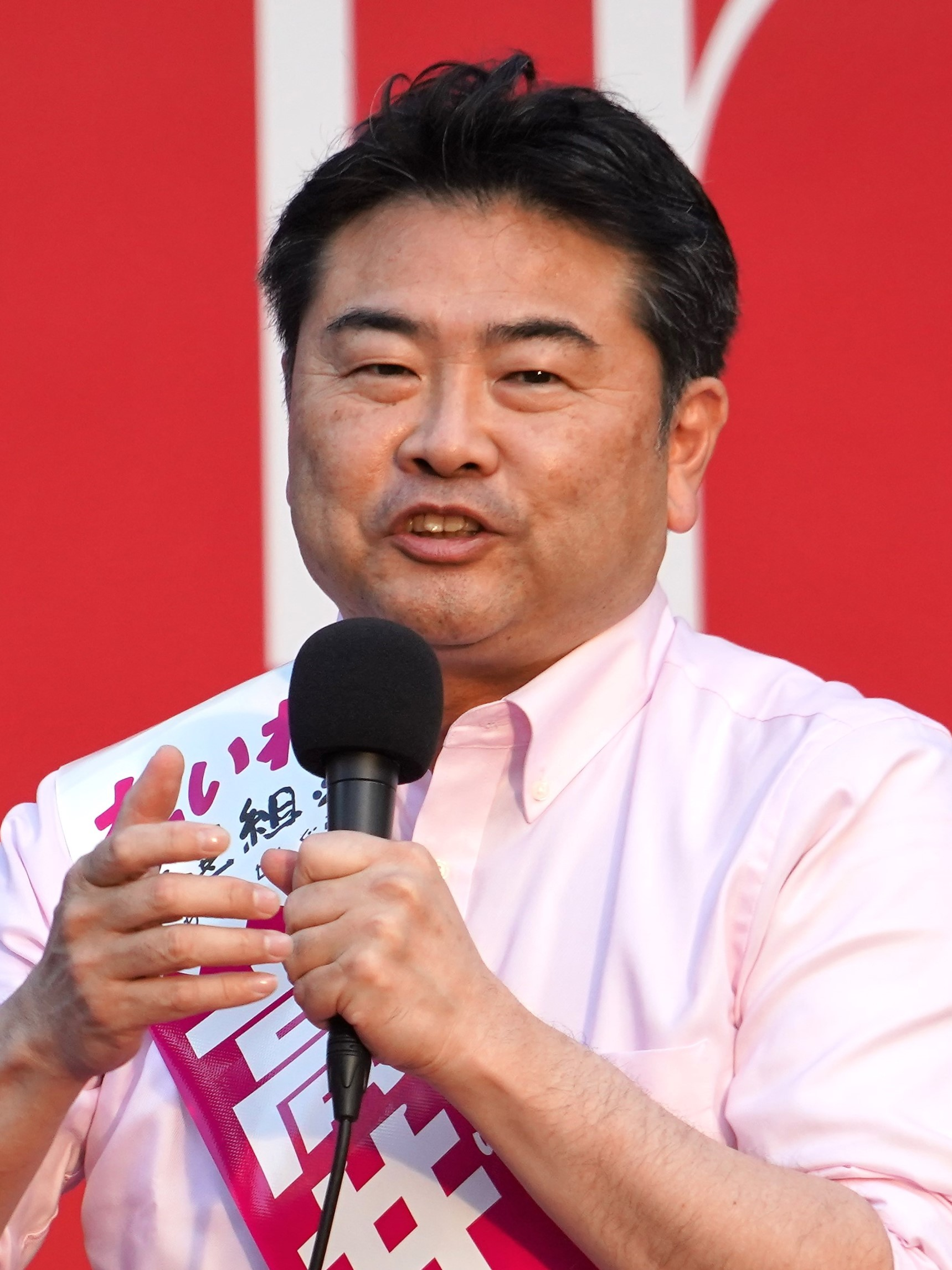
	First party	Second party
Leader	Gaku Hashimoto	Masaaki Taniai
Party	Liberal Democratic	Komeito
Seats before	33	5
Seats after	32	5
Seat change	▼1	Steady
Popular vote	202,668	51,794
Percentage	43.22%	11.04%
	Third party	Fourth party
Leader	Takashi Takai	Ryousuke Yabiki
Party	CDP	JCP
Seats before	2	3
Seats after	2	2
Seat change	Steady	▼1
Popular vote	26,966	18,423
Percentage	5.75%	3.93%
- Post-election composition of the assembly by political party
Governor before election
Ryuta Ibaragi
Independent
Elected Governor
Ryuta Ibaragi
Independent

The 2019 Okayama Prefectural Assembly election (Japanese: 2019年岡山県議会議員選挙, romanized: 2019-nen Okayama Kengikai Giin Senkyo) was held on 7 April 2019 to elect the 55 members of the Okayama Prefectural Assembly.

== Overview ==
Every four years, a total of 55 assembly members are elected to represent the 19 electoral districts of the prefecture. The election coincides with the election for Okayama City Council. In 2019, 16 candidates in the Prefectural Assembly and City Assembly elections ran unopposed, and were elected without voting.

== Results ==
The Liberal Democratic Party lost one seat in the election, but still maintained its dominant position after five independent members aligned themselves with the party.

Election results
Party	Votes	Percentage	Seats	Change
Liberal Democratic Party	202,668	43.22%	32	▼1
Komeito	51,794	11.04%	5	Steady
Constitutional Democratic Party	26,966	5.75%	2	Steady
Japanese Communist Party	18,423	3.93%	2	▼1
Democratic Party For the People	0	0%	1	Steady
Other parties	2,628	0.56%	0	Steady
Independent	166,491	35.50%	13	▲5
Total	468,970	100.00%	55	
