= 2019 Chiba prefectural election =

Election for prefectural assembly members held in 2019

← 2015	7 April 2019	2023 →

All 94 seats in the Chiba Prefectural Assembly 47 seats needed for a majority
- Turnout: 35.26% (▼0.75%)
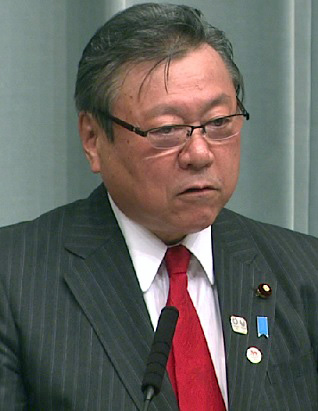

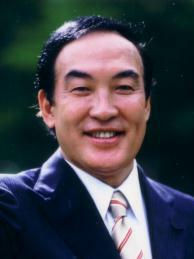

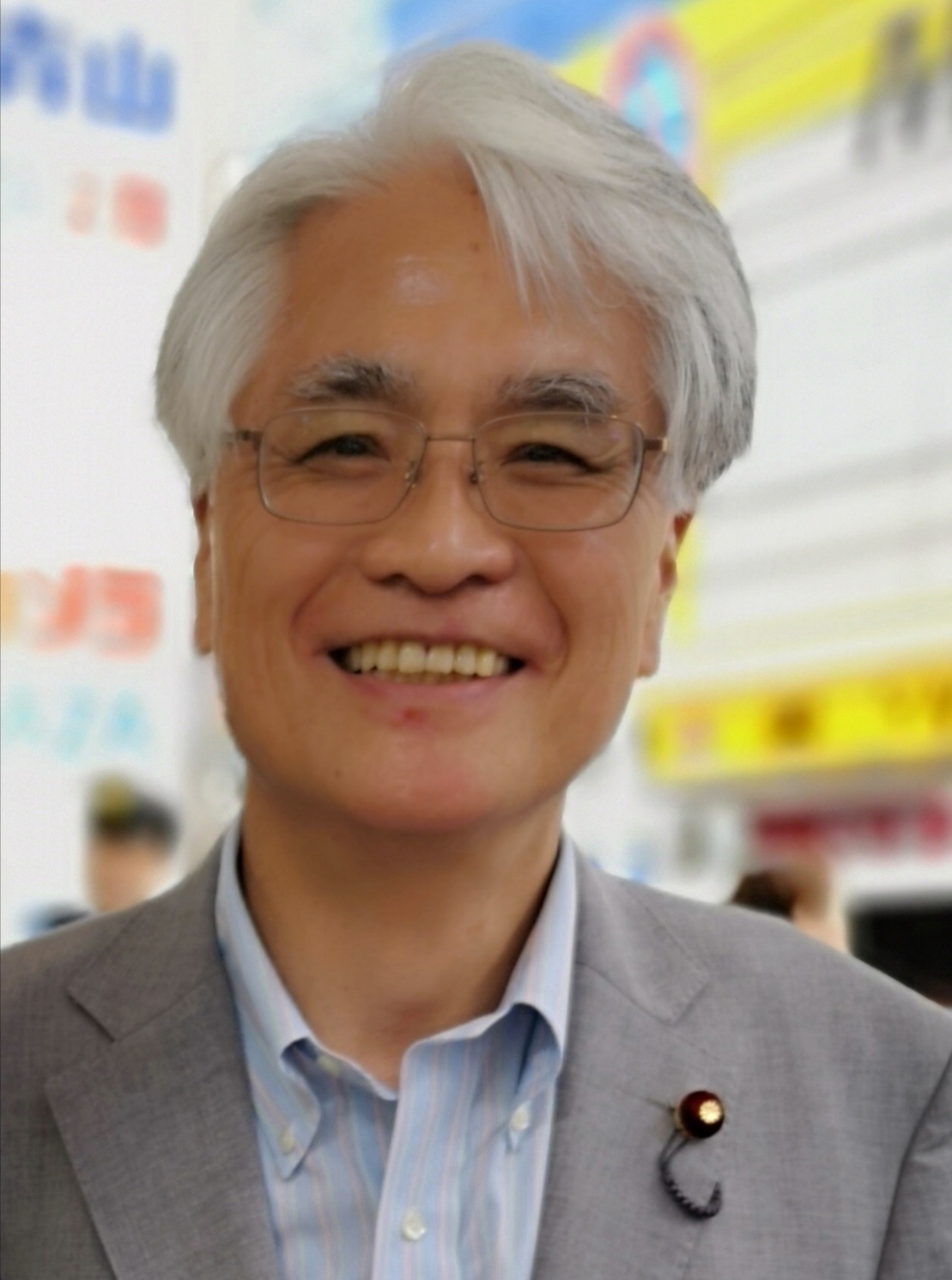

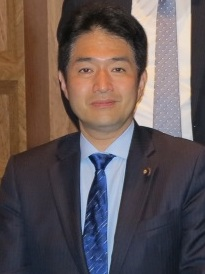
	First party	Second party
Leader	Yoshitaka Sakurada	Yukio Ubukata
Party	LDP	Constitutional Democratic
Seats before	51	8
Seats won	45	10
Seat change	▼6	▲2
Popular vote	446,987	192,983
Percentage	32.40%	13.96%
	Third party	Fourth party
Leader	Shigeyuki Tomita	Sōichirō Okuno
Party	Komeito	Democratic Party for the People
Seats before	8	9
Seats won	8	6
Seat change	Steady	▼3
Popular vote	137,461	84,206
Percentage	9.94%	6.09%
- Post-election composition of the assembly by political parties
Governor before election
Kensaku Morita
Independent
Elected Governor
Kensaku Morita
Independent

The 2019 Chiba Prefectural Assembly Election (Japanese: 2019年千葉県議会議員選挙, romanized: 2019-nen Chiba-ken Gikaigiin Senkyo) was held on 7 April, the first half voting day of the 19th Unified Local Elections of Japan.

== Overview ==
The election was carried out in conjunction with the expiration of the four-year term of the members of prefectural assembly. 130 candidates ran for 94 seats in 46 constituencies, with 25 of the candidates elected unopposed.

== Results ==
The Liberal Democratic Party had a total of 45 candidates elected. Along with 3 candidates that it endorsed, the party retained its majority in the assembly. All of Komeito's officially recognized candidates were elected.

The Constitutional Democratic Party of Japan, which is participating in elections for the first time, gained two seats. The Democratic Party for the People lost two seats. The Japanese Communist Party had its left-wing votes absorbed by the Constitutional Democratic Party of Japan, and although it aimed to win two seats in the Funabashi constituency, it lost both and ended up with only two seats.

Election results
Party	Votes	Percentage	Seats	Change
Liberal Democratic Party	447,987	32.40%	45	▼6
Constitutional Democratic Party	192,983	13.96%	10	▲2
Komeito	137,461	9.94%	8	Steady
Democratic Party For the People	84,206	6.09%	6	▼3
Japanese Communist Party	106,207	7.68%	2	▼3
Other parties	18,608	1.35%	2	Steady
Independent	395,209	28.58%	21	▲3
Total	1,382,661	100.00%	94	
