= 2019 South Caribbean Coast Autonomous Region election =

2019 South Caribbean Coast Autonomous Region, Regional Council election
| ← 2014 | 3 March 2019 |

The eighth general election of the 45-seat Regional Council of the South Caribbean Coast, one of the two autonomous regions of Nicaragua, took place on 3 March 2019.

== Results ==
| Party | Votes | % | Seats | +/– |
|---|---|---|---|---|
| Sandinista National Liberation Front | 24,654 | 53.62 | 34 | +4 |
| Constitutionalist Liberal Party | 12,749 | 27.73 | 9 | +3 |
| Citizens for Liberty | 3,721 | 8.09 | 0 | - |
| YATAMA | 2,523 | 5.49 | 2 | -2 |
| Multiethnic Indigenist Party | 797 | 1.73 | 0 | -2 |
| Independent Liberal Party | 786 | 1.71 | 0 | -3 |
| Nicaraguan Liberal Alliance | 408 | 0.89 | 0 | - |
| Conservative Party | 148 | 0.32 | 0 | - |
| Democratic Restoration Party | 100 | 0.22 | 0 | - |
| Alliance for the Republic | 91 | 0.20 | 0 | - |
| Total | 45,977 votes | 100 | 45 | - |
