= Hiroshi Ogawa (politician) =

Japanese politician (1949–2021)

- 小川 洋
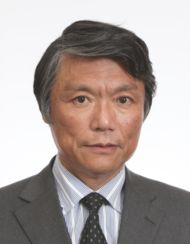
- Ogawa Hiroshi

Governor of Fukuoka Prefecture
- In office 25 April 2011 – 24 March 2021
- Monarchs: Akihito; Naruhito
- Preceded by: Wataru Asō
- Succeeded by: Seitaro Hattori

Personal details
- Born: 17 May 1949 Sawara, Fukuoka, Japan
- Died: 2 November 2021 (aged 72) Higashi-ku, Fukuoka, Japan
- Party: Independent
- Education: Kyoto University

Hiroshi Ogawa (小川 洋, Ogawa Hiroshi; 17 May 1949 – 2 November 2021) was a Japanese politician who became the governor of Fukuoka Prefecture in 2011. In 2015, he was re-elected for a second term, and for a third term in 2019. In 2021 he resigned to receive cancer treatment and the vice governor Seitaro Hattori was elected to replace him.
