= 2019 national electoral calendar =

National and federal elections held in 2019

- Countries with national elections or referendums: Executive Legislative Executive and Legislative Referendum Executive and Referendum Legislative and Referendum Executive, Legislative and Referendum Constitutional Assembly, Executive and Legislative Other

This national electoral calendar for 2019 lists the national/federal elections held in 2019 in all sovereign states and their dependent territories. By-elections are excluded, though national referendums are included.

== February ==
- 3 February: El Salvador, President
- 10 February: Switzerland, Referendum
- 23 February: Nigeria, President, House of Representatives and Senate
- 24 February:
  - Cuba, Constitutional Referendum
  - Moldova, Parliament and Referendum
  - Senegal, President
- 25 February: British Virgin Islands, Legislature

== March ==
- 3 March: Estonia, Parliament
- 5 March: Federated States of Micronesia, Parliament and Referendum
- 10 March:
  - Guinea-Bissau, Parliament
  - North Korea, Parliament
- 16 March: Slovakia, President (1st round)
- 24 March:
  - Comoros, President
  - Ecuador, Council for Citizen Participation and Social Control
  - Thailand, House of Representatives
- 30 March:
  - Slovakia, President (2nd round)
  - U.S. Virgin Islands, Referendum
- 31 March: Ukraine, President (1st round)

== April ==
- 3 April: Solomon Islands, Parliament
- 6 April: Maldives, Parliament
- 7 April: Andorra, Parliament
- 9 April: Israel, Parliament
- 11 April: India, House of the People (1st phase)
- 14 April: Finland, Parliament
- 17 April: Indonesia, President, House of Representatives and Senate
- 18 April: India, House of the People (2nd phase)
- 20–22 April: Egypt, Constitutional Referendum
- 21 April:
  - North Macedonia, President (1st round)
  - Ukraine, President (2nd round)
- 23 April: India, House of the People (3rd phase)
- 28 April:
  - Benin, Parliament
  - Spain, Congress of Deputies
- 29 April: India, House of the People (4th phase)

== May ==
- 5 May:
  - North Macedonia, President (2nd round)
  - Panama, President and Parliament
- 6 May: India, House of the People (5th phase)
- 8 May:
  - Belize, Referendum
  - South Africa, National Assembly
- 12 May:
  - India, House of the People (6th phase)
  - Lithuania, President (1st round) and Referendum
  - New Caledonia, Legislature
- 13 May: Philippines, House of Representatives and Senate
- 18 May: Australia, House of Representatives and Senate
- 19 May:
  - India, House of the People (7th phase)
  - Switzerland, Referendums
- 21 May: Malawi, ~~President~~ and Parliament (presidential election nullified)
- 24 May: Ireland, Constitutional Referendum
- 26 May:
  - Belgium, Federal Chamber of Representatives
  - Lithuania, President (2nd round)
  - Romania, Referendum
- 27 May: Madagascar, National Assembly

== June ==
- 2 June: San Marino, Referendums
- 5 June: Denmark, Parliament
- 9 June:
  - Kazakhstan, President
  - South Ossetia, Parliament
- 16 June: Guatemala, President (1st round) and Parliament
- 22 June: Mauritania, President

== July ==
- 7 July: Greece, Parliament
- 21 July:
  - Japan, House of Councillors
  - Ukraine, Parliament

== August ==
- 11 August: Guatemala, President (2nd round)
- 24 August: Nauru, Parliament
- 25 August: Abkhazia, President (1st round)
- 31 August: Faroe Islands, Legislature

== September ==
- 8 September: Abkhazia, ~~President (2nd round)~~ (election nullified)
- 9 September: Tuvalu, Parliament
- 15 September: Tunisia, President (1st round)
- 17 September: Israel, Parliament
- 28 September: Afghanistan, President
- 29 September: Austria, National Council

== October ==
- 5 October: United Arab Emirates, Parliament
- 6 October:
  - Kosovo, Parliament
  - Portugal, Parliament
  - Tunisia, Parliament
- 13 October:
  - Poland, Sejm and Senate
  - Tunisia, President (2nd round)
- 15 October: Mozambique, President and Parliament
- 17 October: Gibraltar, Legislature
- 20 October:
  - Bolivia, ~~President, Chamber of Deputies and Senate~~ (election nullified)
  - Switzerland, National Council and Council of States (1st round)
- 21 October: Canada, House of Commons
- 23 October: Botswana, Parliament
- 27 October:
  - Argentina, President, Chamber of Deputies and Senate
  - Oman, Consultative Assembly
  - Uruguay, President (1st round), Chamber of Deputies, Senate and Constitutional Referendum

== November ==
- 3 November: Switzerland, Council of States (2nd round 1st phase)
- 5 November: Federated States of Micronesia, Constitutional Convention
- 6 November: Pitcairn Islands, Mayor and Island Council
- 7 November: Mauritius, Parliament
- 10 November:
  - Romania, President (1st round)
  - Spain, Chamber of Deputies
  - Switzerland, Council of States (2nd round 2nd phase)
- 16 November: Sri Lanka, President
- 17 November:
  - Belarus, House of Representatives
  - Switzerland, Council of States (2nd round 3rd phase)
- 18 November:
  - Marshall Islands, Parliament
  - Montserrat, Legislature
- 23 November – 7 December: Bougainville, Independence Referendum
- 24 November:
  - Guinea-Bissau, President (1st round)
  - Liechtenstein, Referendum
  - Romania, President (2nd round)
  - Switzerland, Council of States (2nd round 4th phase)
  - Uruguay, President (2nd round)
- 27 November: Namibia, President and National Assembly

== December ==
- 6 December: Dominica, Parliament
- 8 December: San Marino, Parliament
- 12 December:
  - Algeria, President
  - United Kingdom, House of Commons
- 22 December:
  - Croatia, President (1st round)
  - Uzbekistan, Legislative Chamber (1st round)
- 29 December: Guinea-Bissau, President (2nd round)

== Indirect elections ==
The following indirect elections of heads of state and the upper houses of bicameral legislatures took place through votes in elected lower houses, unicameral legislatures, or electoral colleges:

- 20 February: Bosnia and Herzegovina, House of Peoples
- 14 March: Democratic Republic of the Congo, Senate
- 1 April: San Marino, Captains Regent
- 2 April: Malta, President
- 28 April: Spain, Senate
- 29–30 April: Malaysia, Senate
- 11 May: Federated States of Micronesia, President
- 22 May: South Africa, President
- 26 May: Belgium, Senate
- 27 May: Netherlands, Senate
- 29 May: Latvia, President
- 7 June and 18 July: India, Council of States
- 25 August: Macau, Chief Executive
- 27 August: Nauru, President
- 16–30 September: Rwanda, Senate
- 1 October: San Marino, Captains Regent
- 10 October: Cuba, President and Council of State
- 6 November and 17 December: Austria, Federal Council
- 7 November: Belarus, Council of the Republic
- 10 November: Spain, Senate
- 2 December: Mauritius, President
- 11 December: Switzerland, Federal Council

== See also ==
- 2019 in politics and government
