= 2019 =

2019 in various calendars
- Gregorian calendar: 2019; MMXIX
- Ab urbe condita: 2772
- Armenian calendar: 1468; ԹՎ ՌՆԿԸ
- Assyrian calendar: 6769
- Baháʼí calendar: 175–176
- Balinese saka calendar: 1940–1941
- Bengali calendar: 1425–1426
- Berber calendar: 2969
- British Regnal year: 67 Eliz. 2 – 68 Eliz. 2
- Buddhist calendar: 2563
- Burmese calendar: 1381
- Byzantine calendar: 7527–7528
- Chinese calendar: 戊戌年 (Earth Dog); 4716 or 4509 — to — 己亥年 (Earth Pig); 4717 or 4510
- Coptic calendar: 1735–1736
- Discordian calendar: 3185
- Ethiopian calendar: 2011–2012
- Hebrew calendar: 5779–5780
- Hindu calendars
- Vikram Samvat: 2075–2076
- Shaka Samvat: 1940–1941
- Kali Yuga: 5119–5120
- Holocene calendar: 12019
- Igbo calendar: 1019–1020
- Iranian calendar: 1397–1398
- Islamic calendar: 1440–1441
- Japanese calendar: Heisei 31 / Reiwa 1 (令和元年)
- Javanese calendar: 1952–1953
- Juche calendar: 108
- Julian calendar: Gregorian minus 13 days
- Korean calendar: 4352
- Minguo calendar: ROC 108 民國108年
- Nanakshahi calendar: 551
- Thai solar calendar: 2562
- Tibetan calendar: ས་ཕོ་ཁྱི་ལོ་ (male Earth-Dog); 2145 or 1764 or 992 — to — ས་མོ་ཕག་ལོ་ (female Earth-Boar); 2146 or 1765 or 993
- Unix time: 1546300800 – 1577836799

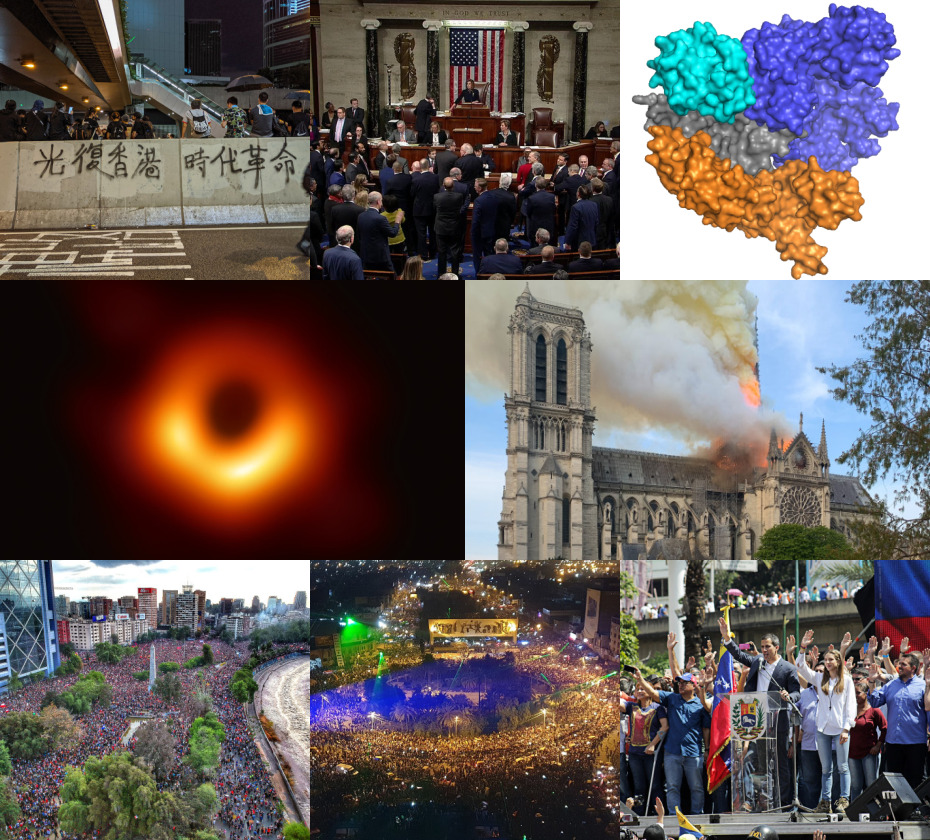
Clockwise from top-left: Hong Kong protests turn to widespread riots and civil disobedience; The U.S. House of Representatives votes to adopt articles of impeachment against Donald Trump due to the Trump–Ukraine scandal and other controversies; CRISPR gene editing is first used to experimentally treat a patient with a genetic disorder; A fire destroys the spire and roof of Notre-Dame de Paris; The Venezuelan presidential crisis divides the nation and the world in support for Nicolás Maduro or Juan Guaidó; Protesters in Tahrir Square, Baghdad during the Iraqi protests, caused by strong Iraqi nationalism; Chileans protest after the increase in the rates of the public transport system of Santiago; The Event Horizon Telescope captures the first image of a black hole.

2019 (MMXIX) was a common year starting on Tuesday of the Gregorian calendar, the 2019th year of the Common Era (CE) and Anno Domini (AD) designations, the 19th year of the 3rd millennium and the 21st century, and the 10th and last year of the 2010s decade.

2019 is also the current year in the Ethiopian Calendar, which is only used by the African countries Ethiopia and Eritrea.

This was the year in which the first known human case of COVID-19 was documented, preceding the pandemic which was declared by the World Health Organization the following year.

Up to that point, 2019 had been described as the "best year in human history" by some newspapers and media outlets in the United States, including The New York Times and WNYC.

== Events ==
=== January ===
- January 1
  - Romania takes over the Presidency of the Council of the European Union, after the Austrian presidency.
  - New Horizons makes a close approach to the Kuiper belt object (KBO) 486958 Arrokoth at 05:33 UTC.
  - Jair Bolsonaro begins his four-year term as President of Brazil.
  - Qatar withdraws from OPEC.
  - Works published by authors who died in 1948 enter the public domain in many countries. In the U.S., all works published in 1923 enter the public domain, the first entry of published works into the public domain since 1998.
- January 2 – Adventist Health System rebranded its facilities to the trade name AdventHealth.
- January 3 – Chinese probe Chang'e 4 becomes the first artificial object to land on the far side of the Moon.
- January 5 – Bartholomew I of Constantinople issues a formal decree granting independence to the Orthodox Church of Ukraine from the Russian Orthodox Church.
- January 6 – Muhammad V of Kelantan abdicates the federal throne as the 15th monarch of Malaysia, the first Malaysian monarch to do so.
- January 7 – A faction of the Armed Forces of Gabon attempts a coup d'état.
- January 10 – Venezuela enters a presidential crisis as Juan Guaidó and the National Assembly declare incumbent President Nicolás Maduro "illegitimate".
- January 14 – Paweł Adamowicz, mayor of Gdańsk, died after he was stabbed shortly after his speech on 27. finale of WOŚP.
- January 23 – Venezuelan presidential crisis: Thousands of people protest in favor of disputed interim President Juan Guaidó. Several people are killed, and President Maduro severs U.S. diplomatic ties.
- January 25 – A mine tailings dam breaks in Brumadinho, Minas Gerais, Brazil. At least 248 people are killed, with 22 missing.
- January 28 – The U.S. Justice Department charges Chinese tech firm Huawei with multiple counts of fraud, raising U.S.–China tensions.

=== February ===
- February 1 – U.S. President Donald Trump confirms that the U.S. will leave the Intermediate-Range Nuclear Forces Treaty of 1987, citing Russian non-compliance. The next day, Russia follows suit with suspension of its obligations to the treaty.
- February 3
  - Pope Francis arrives in Abu Dhabi, United Arab Emirates, becoming the first pope to visit the Arabian Peninsula.
  - 2019 Salvadoran presidential election: Nayib Bukele is elected president.
- February 6 – The Freedom House declares that Hungary is no longer a free country, making it the first country in the EU to be labelled "partly free". It also states that Serbia is no longer free as well.
- February 7 – 2019 Haitian protests: Anti-government protests demanding the resignation of Haitian President Jovenel Moïse begin in several cities across the country.
- February 12 – The Republic of Macedonia renames itself the Republic of North Macedonia, officially ending a decades-old dispute with Greece and paving the way for the former's integration into NATO and the EU.
- February 21 – SpaceIL launches the Beresheet probe, the world's first privately financed mission to the Moon.
- February 23
  - Venezuelan presidential crisis: President Maduro severs diplomatic ties with Colombia amid attempts to send humanitarian aid to the country across the border.
  - 2019 Nigerian general election: Incumbent president Muhammadu Buhari is reelected and the All Progressives Congress party wins 63 out of 109 seats in the Senate of Nigeria and 202 out of 360 seats in the House of Representatives.
- February 24
  - 2019 Cuban constitutional referendum: The new constitution was approved by 90.61% of valid votes.
  - The 2019 Moldovan parliamentary election is held to elect all 101 members of the Parliament of Moldova.
  - 2019 Senegalese presidential election: Incumbent president Macky Sall is reelected.
- February 26–27 – The Indian Air Force launches airstrikes on purported militant camps in Balakot, Pakistan. It precedes a series of events that lead to the 2019 India–Pakistan standoff.
- February 27–28 – The 2019 North Korea–United States summit is held in Hanoi, Vietnam. It is the second summit between U.S. President Donald Trump and North Korean leader Kim Jong Un.

=== March ===
- March 3
  - An uncrewed demonstration flight of the new crew capable version of the SpaceX Dragon spacecraft, intended to carry American astronauts into space, achieves successful autonomous docking with the International Space Station.
  - The 2019 Estonian parliamentary election is held to elect all 101 members of the Riigikogu.
- March 5 – A second case of sustained remission from HIV is reported, ten years after the Berlin Patient.
- March 6 – Venezuelan presidential crisis: Venezuela expels German ambassador Daniel Kriener for his alleged meddling in internal affairs.
- March 10 – Ethiopian Airlines Flight 302, a Boeing 737 MAX 8 bound for Nairobi, crashes shortly after takeoff from Addis Ababa, killing all 157 people on board. All Boeing 737 MAX aircraft are subsequently grounded worldwide.
- March 13 – A massacre in Suzano, Brazil, resulted in the deaths of 10 people: 8 were students at the Raul Brasil State School, 1 was the owner of a vehicle dealership, and the other 2 were the perpetrators of the attack.
- March 15
  - Cyclone Idai makes landfall on Mozambique, causing at least 1,073 fatalities, as well as mass flooding and power outages in southern Africa.
  - 51 people are killed and 50 others injured in terrorist attacks on two mosques in Christchurch, New Zealand. It is the deadliest mass shooting and terrorist attack in New Zealand's history.
- March 19 – Nursultan Nazarbayev resigns as President of Kazakhstan after 29 years in office and appoints Kassym-Jomart Tokayev as acting president. Astana is renamed Nur-Sultan the following day in his honor.
- March 20 – Europe's antitrust regulators fine Google €1.49 billion (US$1.7 billion) for freezing out rivals in the online advertising business, bringing the total cost of EU fines against Google at nearly €8.76 billion.
- March 23 – The final territory of the Islamic State, located in Al-Baghuz Fawqani, Syria, is liberated.
- March 24 – The first phase of Jakarta's MRT system opened with its first line.
- March 26 – The European Parliament votes by 348 to 278 in favour of the EU Directive on Copyright in the Digital Single Market, which expands legal liability for websites and includes the controversial Article 13.
- March 31 – Taiwan scrambles its fighter aircraft after two Chinese jets crossed the maritime border between the two nations. Just the day before, Japan had similarly scrambled its jets after Chinese jets flew between Miyako and Okinawa.

=== April ===
- April 2 – Abdelaziz Bouteflika resigns as President of Algeria amid widespread protests, after nearly two decades in office.
- April 4 – Second Libyan Civil War: The Libyan National Army (LNA) launches a surprise offensive in western Libya, moving units towards the Government of National Accord-held capital Tripoli and capturing Gharyan.
- April 6 – 2019 Maldivian parliamentary election: The Maldivian Democratic Party wins 65 out of the 85 seats in the People's Majlis.

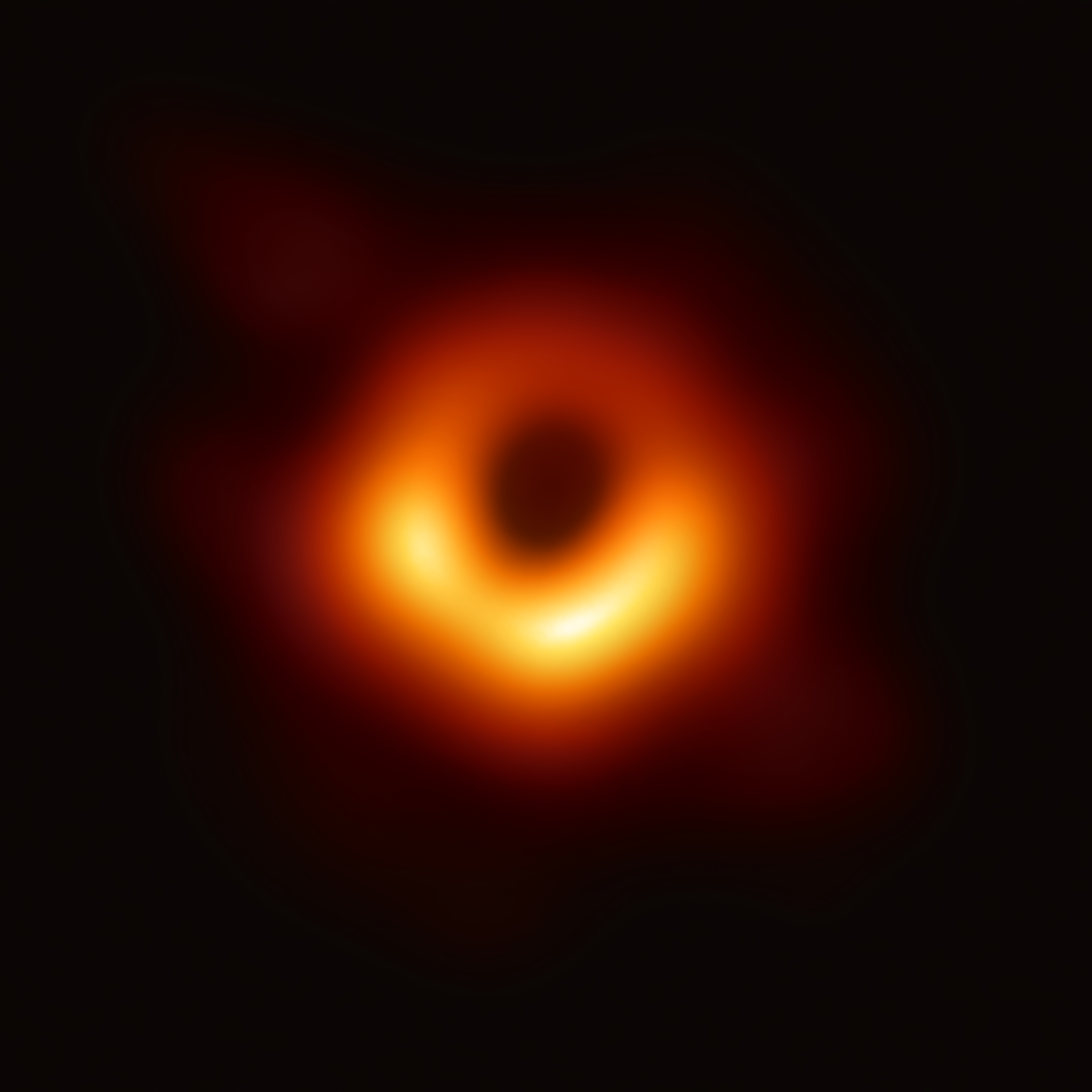
The Event Horizon Telescope image of the core of M87 black hole. The central dark spot is the shadow of M87* and is larger than the black hole's event horizon.

- April 10
  - Scientists from the Event Horizon Telescope project announce the first ever image of a black hole, located in the centre of the M87 galaxy.
  - Fossil fragments found in the Callao Cave in the Philippines reveal the existence of a new species of human, the Homo luzonensis. The species is named after Luzon, where the fossils were discovered.
- April 11
  - WikiLeaks co-founder Julian Assange is arrested after seven years in Ecuador's embassy in London.
  - Amid mass protests, Omar al-Bashir is deposed as President of Sudan in a coup d'état, after nearly 30 years in office.
- April 15 – During Holy Week, a major fire engulfs Notre-Dame Cathedral in Paris, resulting in the roof and main spire collapsing.
- April 16 – The Howse Peak avalanche kills three noted mountaineers: Austrians Hansjörg Auer and David Lama, and Canadian Jess Roskelley.
- April 18 – NepaliSat-1 is launched. It is Nepal's first ever research satellite to be sent into space.
- April 21
  - A series of Islamist bomb attacks occur at eight locations in Sri Lanka, including three churches, four hotels and one housing complex in Colombo, on Easter Sunday, leaving 259 people dead and over 500 injured. It is the deadliest terrorist attack in the country since the Sri Lankan Civil War ended in 2009.
  - 2019 Ukrainian presidential election: Volodymyr Zelenskyy is elected the President of Ukraine in a landslide victory in the second round of voting. He took office on May 20, 2019.
- April 25 – North Korean leader Kim Jong Un visits Russia to hold a series of summits with Russian leaders, including President Vladimir Putin.
- April 28 – Victor Vescovo achieves the deepest dive of any human in history, as he reaches Challenger Deep within the Mariana Trench, at a depth of 10,928 m (35,853 ft).
- April 29 – Elusive Islamic State leader Abu Bakr al-Baghdadi appears in undated footage released by the group, his first appearance on video since 2014.
- April 30
  - Emperor Akihito of Japan abdicates from his throne, the first abdication by a Japanese monarch in almost two centuries. The abdication ends the Heisei era of Japan and ushers in the Reiwa era with new emperor Naruhito ascending the throne on May 1.
  - Venezuelan presidential crisis: Venezuelan opposition leader and disputed interim President Juan Guaidó leads an attempted uprising against President Nicolás Maduro.

=== May ===
- May 1
  - King Vajiralongkorn of Thailand marries his personal bodyguard Suthida Tidjai – a commoner – in a surprise ceremony, making her queen consort of Thailand.
  - Russian President Vladimir Putin signs into law a controversial "sovereign internet" bill that allows Russian authorities to better monitor internet routing and to steer Russian internet traffic away from foreign servers.
- May 3 – The number of deaths from the Kivu Ebola epidemic exceeds 1,000. It is the second deadliest Ebola outbreak in history, only surpassed by the Western African Ebola virus epidemic of 2013–2016.
- May 3–6 – May 2019 Gaza–Israel clashes: The Gaza–Israel conflict escalates after the Israeli military launches airstrikes into Gaza killing more than 20 Palestinians including a pregnant woman and a toddler following the injury of two soldiers from Gazan sniper fire.
- May 5 – Aeroflot Flight 1492 crash-lands and bursts into flames at Sheremetyevo International Airport, Moscow, killing 41 of the 78 people on board.
- May 6
  - In its first report since 2005, the Intergovernmental Science-Policy Platform on Biodiversity and Ecosystem Services (IPBES) warns that biodiversity loss is "accelerating", with over a million species now threatened with extinction; the decline of the natural living world is "unprecedented" and largely a result of human actions, according to the report.
  - Syrian civil war: The Syrian Army launches a major ground offensive against one of the last rebel strongholds in the country.
- May 8 – A British teenager, Isabelle Holdaway, 17, is reported to be the first patient ever to receive a genetically modified phage therapy to treat a drug-resistant infection.
- May 10 – Amid ongoing negotiations, the U.S.'s 25% tariff hike on US$200 billion worth of Chinese imports takes effect, escalating tensions between the two nations in the ongoing China–United States trade war.
- May 12 – May 2019 Gulf of Oman incident: Four commercial ships, including two Saudi Aramco oil tankers, are damaged near Fujairah in the Gulf of Oman. The UAE claims it as a "sabotage attack", while an early U.S. assessment blames Iran. The incident occurs after increased U.S.-Iran tensions provoked by the deployment of U.S. military to the Persian Gulf in response to an alleged plot by Iran to attack U.S. forces.
- May 13 – Prosecutors in Sweden reopen the rape allegation investigation against Julian Assange. Swedish prosecutors mention their intent to seek extradition of Assange from the U.K. after he has served his 50-week prison sentence for skipping bail.
- May 14–18 – The Eurovision Song Contest 2019 takes place in Tel Aviv, Israel, and is won by Dutch entrant Duncan Laurence with the song "Arcade".
- May 17 – Taiwan's parliament becomes the first in Asia to legalise same-sex marriage.
- May 18 – 2019 Australian federal election: Scott Morrison's Liberal/National Coalition government is narrowly re-elected, defeating the Labor Party led by Bill Shorten.
- May 19 – China–United States trade war: Google pulls Android update support for Huawei phones, as well as the Google Play Store and Gmail apps, after the company's blacklisting by the U.S. government.
- May 20 – The revision of the SI system of measurement adopted by the majority of countries in the world takes effect.
- May 23 – 2019 Indian general election: Narendra Modi secures a landslide victory, with his party BJP alone gaining 303 of the 543 seats in parliament, and his political alliance NDA winning 353 seats of the 543.
- May 24
  - British Prime Minister Theresa May announces her resignation as Conservative leader, effective June 7, 2019.
  - A prison riot in Acarigua, Venezuela, leaves 29 prisoners dead and 19 guards injured.
- May 26–27 – Amazonas prison massacres: More than 50 prisoners are killed in a series of riots at four different prisons in Amazonas, Brazil.
- May 27 – U.S. President Donald Trump, during an official state visit to Japan, becomes the first foreign leader to meet with Japanese emperor Naruhito.
- May 30–July 14 – The 2019 Cricket World Cup is held in England (one match in Wales) with England defeating New Zealand in the final.

=== June ===
- June 1 – Liverpool F.C win their 6th UEFA Champions League title against fellow English club Tottenham Hotspur F.C. 2–0 at the Metropolitano Stadium, with goals from Mohamed Salah and Divock Origi.
- June 2
  - Nearly five years after abdication, King Juan Carlos I retires from public life.
  - 2019 San Marino referendum: Sammarinese voters vote to end discrimination based on sexual orientation and initiate a popular legislative initiative for the reform of the electoral system.
- June 3 – Khartoum massacre: More than 100 people are killed when Sudanese troops and Janjaweed militiamen storm and open fire on a protest camp outside of a military headquarters in Khartoum, Sudan.
- June 3–5 – U.S. President Donald Trump makes a state visit to the U.K., meeting with Queen Elizabeth II and outgoing Prime Minister Theresa May. It is the first official state visit to the U.K. by a sitting U.S. president since 2011. Trump also attends D-Day commemorative ceremonies.
- June 5–8 – Chinese President Xi Jinping makes a state visit to Russia, where he also attends the St. Petersburg International Economic Forum.
- June 6 – Sudanese revolution: The African Union suspends Sudan's membership "with immediate effect" after the Khartoum massacre.
- June 7 – British Prime Minister Theresa May resigns as leader of the Conservative Party.
- June 7–July 7 – The 2019 FIFA Women's World Cup is held in France and is won by the United States.
- June 9
  - 2019–2020 Hong Kong protests: Over 1 million people in Hong Kong protest against proposed legislation regarding extradition to mainland China. It is the largest protest in Hong Kong since the 1997 handover.
  - A large explosive eruption of Mount Sinabung in Indonesia sends a 7,000-meter ash column into the air, generating a pyroclastic flow 3–3.5 kilometers long towards the south and southeast of the mountain.
- June 11 – Botswana decriminalizes homosexuality.
- June 12
  - The Supreme Court of Ecuador rules in favor of same-sex marriage, making it legal throughout the country.
  - 12 June 2019 Hong Kong protest: The Hong Kong government and police controversially declare that the protest has "turned into a riot".
- June 13 – June 2019 Gulf of Oman incident: Two oil tankers are attacked near the Strait of Hormuz while transiting the Gulf of Oman amid heightened tension between Iran and the U.S., with the latter blaming the former for the incident.
- June 15 – 2019–2020 Hong Kong protests: Hong Kong announces it will indefinitely suspend the controversial extradition bill, but protests continue, this time calling for the total withdrawal of the bill and the resignation of Chief Executive Carrie Lam.
- June 16 – A large-scale power outage hits Argentina, Uruguay and parts of Paraguay, affecting nearly 50 million people.
- June 17 – A triple suicide blast kills 30 and injures over 40 in Borno, Nigeria, at a hall where people were watching a football match.
- June 18 – The U.S. sends an additional 1,000 troops to the Middle East as tensions build with Iran.
- June 19 – Four men are charged with murdering the 298 passengers and crew of Malaysia Airlines Flight 17, an airliner shot down while flying over Eastern Ukraine in July 2014.
- June 20–21 – Chinese President Xi Jinping makes a state visit to North Korea. It is his first visit to the country as president and the first visit to North Korea by a Chinese leader since Hu Jintao's visit 14 years prior.
- June 20 – 2019 Iranian shoot-down of American drone: Iran shoots down a U.S. RQ-4 Global Hawk surveillance drone over the Strait of Hormuz after claiming it violated their airspace. The U.S. claims it has been shot down in international airspace in an "unprovoked attack".
- June 22 – Amhara Region coup attempt: In the Amhara Region of Ethiopia, regional president Ambachew Mekonnen and national-military chief of staff Se'are Mekonnen are assassinated.
- June 30 – During a trilateral gathering at the Panmunjom Truce Village between South Korean President Moon Jae-in, North Korean Leader Kim Jong Un and U.S. President Donald Trump, Trump becomes the first sitting U.S. president to cross the Korean Demilitarized Zone and enter North Korea. Trump and Kim also agree to restart stalled denuclearization negotiations.

=== July ===
- July – The National Oceanic and Atmospheric Administration (NOAA) reports, on August 15, that July 2019 has been the hottest month on record globally, at 0.95 °C (1.71 °F) above the 20th-century average.
- July 1
  - Finland takes over the Presidency of the Council of the European Union, after the Romanian presidency.
  - Japan resumes commercial whaling after a 30-year moratorium, following its withdrawal from the International Whaling Commission.
  - Japan announces tightening high-tech exports to South Korea, thus beginning the trade dispute between the two countries.
  - The International Atomic Energy Agency confirms that Iran has breached the limit on its stockpile of enriched uranium.
  - 2019–2020 Hong Kong protests: During the annual July 1 protests that mark the anniversary of the British handover of the city to China, a group of a few hundred protesters stormed the Legislative Council of Hong Kong, defacing various portraits and destroying furniture before being dispersed by police using tear gas.
  - A fire on the Russian deep-diving submarine Losharik kills 14 crew members. Submarine commander Denis Dolonsky is among those killed.
- July 2 – A total solar eclipse occurs over South America. It is the 58th solar eclipse from Saros cycle 127.
- July 3 – 2019 Tajoura migrant center airstrike: An airstrike by Field Marshal Khalifa Haftar's Libyan National Army hits the Tajoura Detention Center outside Tripoli, Libya, while hundreds of people are inside the facility, killing at least 53 of them and injuring 130 others.
- July 7 – 2019 Greek legislative election: The New Democracy party wins 158 of 300 seats in the Hellenic Parliament.
- July 10 – The last Volkswagen Beetle rolls off the line in Puebla, Mexico. The last of 5,961 "Special Edition" cars will be exhibited in a museum.
- July 12 – Asasey Hotel attack: A car bomb and a gun attack kill at least 26 people, including two prominent journalists and nine foreigners, in Kismayo, Somalia. Islamist group al-Shabaab claims responsibility.
- July 13 – Hurricane Barry strikes the Gulf Coast, killing one and causing over $500 million (2019 USD) in damages.
- July 16 – The European Parliament elects Ursula von der Leyen as the new President of the European Commission. Succeeding Jean-Claude Juncker, she will be sworn in on December 1, 2019. She is the first female to be elected to this office in EU history.
- July 17
  - United States v. Guzmán: Joaquín "El Chapo" Guzmán, former head of the Sinaloa Cartel, which became the biggest supplier of drugs to the U.S., is sentenced to life in prison plus 30 years.
  - The World Health Organization (WHO) declares the Kivu Ebola epidemic to be a public health emergency of international concern.
- July 18 – 36 people are killed and more than 30 others injured after an arson attack at an animation company in Kyoto, Japan. It is one of the deadliest massacres in the country's history since the end of World War II and the deadliest building fire in the country in 18 years, since the Myojo 56 building fire in 2001.
- July 19 – The Iranian Navy of the Islamic Revolutionary Guard Corps captures British tanker Stena Impero and temporarily seizes British-operated and Liberian-flagged tanker Mesdar in the Persian Gulf. The British Foreign Secretary, Jeremy Hunt, warns there will be "serious consequences" if Iran does not release the tanker.
- July 21 – A mob of over 100 suspected triad members dressed in white and armed with batons attack commuters indiscriminately at MTR Yuen Long station in Hong Kong, injuring 45, including a pro-democracy legislator and a pregnant woman. Hong Kong police have been accused of allowing the violence to happen due to their delayed response and decision to limit emergency services in the area. (The Guardian) (SCMP)
- July 24 – Boris Johnson becomes Prime Minister of the United Kingdom after defeating Jeremy Hunt in a leadership contest, succeeding Theresa May.
- July 26–August 11 – The 2019 Pan American Games are held in Lima, Peru.
- 27 July -
  - Israeli and Hezbollah exchange gunfire and artillery at the border of the Golan Heights, after a "security incident" with both claiming that the other crossed the border without confrontation, with two dozen explosions heard across Lebanon.
  - 40 killed in an Israeli aerial attack on Camp Ashraf in Iraq, targeting IRGC and PMF stockpiles of ballistic missile launchers.
- July 30 – India bans triple talaq.

=== August ===
- August 1 – Danish polar research institution Polar Portal reports a large spike in Greenland ice loss, with 11 billion tons melted in one day and 197 gigatonnes during the month of July.
- August 2
  - The United States officially withdraws from the Intermediate-Range Nuclear Forces Treaty established with Russia in 1987.
  - 2019–2020 Japan–South Korea trade dispute: Japan announces the removal of South Korea from its list of most trusted trading partners, effective on August 28.
- August 3 - 23 people are killed during the 2019 El Paso Walmart shooting.
- August 5
  - Revocation of the special status of Jammu and Kashmir: India revokes the part of its constitution that gives Indian-administered Kashmir special status in an unprecedented move.
  - 2019–20 Hong Kong protests: Amid ongoing protests, Hong Kong is hit by the first general strikes of their kind since 1967.
- August 7 – The Singapore Mediation Convention, also known as the UN Convention on International Settlement Agreements Resulting from Mediation, comes into effect. States that have ratified the treaty must enforce international commercial agreements in their courts.
- August 8 – Nyonoksa radiation accident: Reports indicate that there may have been a nuclear explosion at the Nyonoksa weapons-testing site in Arkhangelsk Oblast, Russia. At least five people were killed and three others injured in the blast, with radiation levels in Severodvinsk, 47 km (29 mi) from the site, being 20 times above normal levels temporarily.
- August 10
  - Morogoro tanker explosion: A fuel tanker truck explodes in Morogoro, Tanzania, killing at least 89 people and injuring dozens more.
  - 32 are killed and 1,000,000 evacuated as Typhoon Lekima makes landfall in Zhejiang, China. Earlier it had caused flooding in the Philippines.
- August 10–25 – 2019 Canary Islands wildfires: A number of forest fires break out in the Canary Islands of Gran Canaria, Tenerife and Lanzarote. The fires on the island of Gran Canaria were the most severe, resulting in the loss of large areas of the island's forests and leading to the evacuation of thousands of residents from a number of towns and villages.
- August 11 – 2019 Indian floods: At least 114 people, including 57 in Kerala, 30 in Karnataka and 27 in Maharashtra, are reported to have died in monsoon-related floods in India. At least 227 died across India, Nepal, Bangladesh and Pakistan.
- August 12
  - 2019–20 Hong Kong protests: Hong Kong International Airport is closed due to protests.
  - 2019–2020 Japan–South Korea trade dispute: South Korea announces the removal of Japan from its list of most trusted trading partners, effective on September 18.
  - The Trump administration announces it will delay its proposal for 10 percent tariffs slated to take effect from September 1 on certain consumer goods from China while exempting other products — less than two weeks after Trump announced the new proposed tariffs.
- August 13 – The main yield curve for U.S. Treasury bonds inverts, as the yield rate for 2-year bonds rises higher than the yield rate for 10-year bonds.
- August 14 – The Dow Jones plunges more than 500 points, due to concerns over the yield curve inversion.
- August 15 – The European Central Bank shuts down PNB Banka after ruling it had become insolvent; this bank, previously called Norvik Banka, has been Latvia's sixth-largest lender, and a critic of the Baltic country's financial authorities.
- August 16 – Russian airstrike kills 20 civilians in the Hass refugee camp
- August 18 – 100 activists, officials, and other concerned citizens in Iceland hold a funeral for Okjökull glacier, which has completely melted after once covering 15.5 km^{2} (6 sq mi).
- August 19 – 2019 Papua protests erupt, mainly across Indonesian Papua, in response to an incident in Surabaya where a group of Papuan students were arrested for alleged disrespect of the Indonesian flag. In Jayapura, Sorong, Fakfak, Timika and Manokwari, protests turned violent, with various private buildings and public facilities being damaged or burned. The protests and unrest were described by Reuters as "the most serious civil unrest in years over perceived racial and ethnic discrimination."
- August 21
  - 2019 Amazon rainforest wildfires: Brazil's National Institute for Space Research (INPE) reports fires burning in the Amazon rainforest at a record rate, with more than 36,000 in the year to date, while smoke reaches São Paulo more than 2,700 kilometres (1,700 mi) away.
  - Giuseppe Conte offers his resignation as Prime Minister of Italy in order to avoid a no-confidence motion.
- August 23 – German Chancellor Angela Merkel and French President Emmanuel Macron describe the widespread Amazon fires as an international emergency, urging the matter to be discussed at the weekend's G7 summit.
- August 25 – 2019 Beirut drone crash: According to Lebanese officials, two Israeli drones attack Beirut, Lebanon. One crashed into the roof of the Hezbollah Media Center, about 45 minutes before the second exploded in the air and damaged the building. It is the first such incident between Israel and Lebanon since the 2006 Lebanon War.
- August 31 – 2019 Alta helicopter crash: A sightseeing helicopter crashes in the mountains of Skoddevarre in Alta Municipality, Norway, killing all 6 occupants.

=== September ===
- September 1 – Hurricane Dorian makes landfall on The Bahamas as the strongest hurricane ever recorded in the Atlantic basin outside the Caribbean and Gulf of Mexico, with sustained wind speeds of 185 mph. 43 deaths are reported.
- September 2
  - Sinking of MV Conception: 34 people are killed following a fire and subsequent sinking of a dive boat near Santa Cruz Island, California, United States. It is the worst maritime disaster in California in more than 150 years.
  - Iranian woman Sahar Khodayari sets herself on fire after being arrested for attending a soccer game in Iran. She dies a week later.
- September 4
  - 2019–20 Hong Kong protests: Hong Kong Chief Executive Carrie Lam announces the official withdrawal of the controversial Fugitive Offenders and Mutual Legal Assistance in Criminal Matters Legislation (Amendment) Bill 2019, and setting up of an independent study to probe social and economic inequality within the territory.
  - In the United States, the Federal Trade Commission threatens to fine YouTube and Google up to $170 million for violation of collecting personal information from children under 13. Google tracked children's YouTube history to regulate targeted advertising and the FTC took notice and took action.
- September 6 – Chandrayaan-2, India's second lunar probe, is successfully placed in lunar orbit, but the lander Vikram crashes into the surface of the Moon.
- September 7
  - Afghan peace process: U.S. President Donald Trump announces he has "called off" planned peace talks with the Taliban at Camp David after they claimed responsibility for the September 2 and 5 bombings in Kabul which killed a U.S. soldier, among others.
  - Ukrainian filmmaker Oleg Sentsov and 66 others are released in a prisoner exchange between Ukraine and Russia.
- September 10 – The Parliament of the United Kingdom is prorogued amid unprecedented protests from opposition MPs, who hold up signs in the House of Commons and refuse to back the shutdown.
- September 11 – Astronomers announce the detection of water in the atmosphere of exoplanet K2-18b, the first such discovery for an exoplanet in the habitable zone around a star.
- September 14 – 2019 Abqaiq–Khurais attack: Two Saudi Aramco oil refineries in Abqaiq and Khurais, Saudi Arabia, are attacked by drones, resulting in fires. Houthi militants claim responsibility, saying that they used ten drones for the attack. Aramco's oil exports and production are disrupted by five million barrels a day, close to half of the entire Saudi Arabian oil exports.
- September 16 – A gas explosion in Koltsovo, Novosibirsk Oblast, Russia sets off a fire in a bioweapons plant that houses viruses including smallpox, ebola and anthrax.
- September 17 – Interest rates on repurchase agreements (or "repos") in the United States experience a sudden and unexpected spike.
- September 19 – 30 Afghan nut farmers are killed and 40 injured in a U.S. drone attack in Nangarhar Province.
- September 20 – An international strike and protest led by young people and adults is held three days before the latest UN Climate Summit, to demand action be taken to address the climate crisis. Gathering 6 million people in 4,500 locations across 150 countries, the event is one of the largest climate mobilizations in history.
- September 20–November 2 – The 2019 Rugby World Cup is held in Japan and is won by South Africa who defeated England in the final.
- September 21 – U.S. President Donald Trump approves deployment of several hundred troops and military equipment to Saudi Arabia and United Arab Emirates following the September 14 attack on Saudi oil refineries. Both Saudi Arabia and Iran vow to defend themselves.
- September 22 – Nearly three weeks after Hurricane Dorian makes landfall on The Bahamas, the official death toll stands at 52 and 1,300 are reported missing. Rescuers report the widespread stench of rotting bodies in the rubble.
- September 23
  - One of the largest and oldest travel firms, Thomas Cook, goes bankrupt as last-minute rescue negotiations fail, stranding 600,000 tourists worldwide.
  - Russia formally adopts the Paris climate agreement.
- September 24
  - The Supreme Court of the United Kingdom unanimously rules in R (Miller) v The Prime Minister that the September 2019 prorogation of Parliament is unlawful and void.
  - The Supreme Court of Spain unanimously rules in favour of the exhumation of the remains of Spanish dictator Francisco Franco from the Valle de los Caídos. He is finally exhumed on October 24, being re-inhumed in a private crypt with his wife.
  - U.S. Speaker of the House Nancy Pelosi announces the start of a formal impeachment inquiry against President Donald Trump.
- September 27
  - 500,000 people march in a climate change protest led by activist Greta Thunberg and Prime Minister Justin Trudeau in Montreal, Canada. 4,000,000 go on strike around the world.
  - The United Nations University Centre for Policy Research's Financial Sector Commission on Modern Slavery and Human Trafficking releases its final report, Unlocking Potential: A Blueprint for Mobilizing Finance Against Slavery and Trafficking, during the United Nations General Assembly in New York.
- September 30 – The Republic of Ireland promises to plant 440 million trees in twenty years to combat climate change.

=== October ===
- October 1
  - 2019–20 Hong Kong protests: A protester is shot in the chest with a live round of ammunition and critically injured.
  - The Nanfang'ao Bridge, the only steel single-arch bridge in Taiwan, collapses, killing six people and injuring more than twenty others.
- October 2 – 25 soldiers are killed and 60 missing following attacks on two army camps in Boulkessi and Mondoro, Mali.
- October 3 – European Commission spokesperson Daniel Rosario threatens retaliatory measures if the United States imposes a US$7.5-billion (approximately €6.8-billion) tariff on products such as olives, whiskey, wine, cheese, yogurt, and airplanes. The tariffs are scheduled to take place on October 18.
- October 4 – 2019–20 Hong Kong protests: Hong Kong Chief Executive Carrie Lam and the Chief Executive in Council invokes the Emergency Regulations Ordinance and banning the face mask in public gatherings with immediate effect.
- October 5 – 2019 Iraqi protests: 91 people are killed by police during a week of demonstrations in Iraq.
- October 8
  - 2019 Ecuadorian protests: The Government of Ecuador, headed by President Lenín Moreno, moves to Guayaquil as the Carondelet Palace in Quito is overtaken by protesters and chaos persists in the capital.
  - About 200 Extinction Rebellion activists block the gates of Leinster House (parliament) in the Republic of Ireland.
- October 9
  - 2019 Turkish offensive into north-eastern Syria: President Recep Tayyip Erdoğan of Turkey announces a military invasion of north-eastern Syria, targeting the SDF and other Kurdish militias.
  - The United Nations Assistance Mission in Afghanistan and the U.N. Human Rights Office issue a report that says that U.S. bombings in Nimroz and Farah Province, Afghanistan, that killed 39 civilians are unlawful. The U.S. said the attacks were against drug labs that fund the Taliban.
- October 12 – Typhoon Hagibis makes landfall in Japan, the biggest storm to hit the region in decades, with over seven million people urged to evacuate.
- October 14
  - Trial of Catalonia independence leaders: The Supreme Court of Spain sentences nine Catalan independence movement leaders to 9 to 13 years of prison for sedition and misuse of public funds. Three others are disqualified for 1 year and 8 months for disobedience. Violent protests erupt across Catalonia.
  - A New York Times investigation reveals that Russian planes had bombed at least 50 hospitals and clinics in opposition-held Idlib, Syria.
- October 16 – Venezuelan councilman and opposition politician Edmundo Rada is reported missing. He is found dead the following day on the side of the road out of Petare, Caracas, burned and with two coup de grâce shots in the back of his neck.
- October 17 – Shootouts erupt in Culiacán, Mexico, after the arrest of El Chapo's son, Ovidio Guzmán López, on an arrest warrant for drug dealing in the United States. Eight people are killed and 56 convicts escape from prison; 7 are recaptured by October 18. Guzmán López is released in an effort to restore peace and to prevent more bloodshed.
- October 18
  - NASA astronauts Jessica Meir and Christina Koch conduct the first all-female spacewalk outside of the International Space Station.
  - Riots in Chilean capital city Santiago erupt as civil unrest escalated as a reaction to a series of economic measures and Government's declarations labeled as abuse by protesters
- October 19 – An estimated one million people march through London in a protest organised by People's Vote, to demand a second referendum on Brexit.
- October 20 – On World Mission Day, Pope Francis declares the month of October 2019 an "extraordinary Missionary Month".
- October 23
  - The bodies of 39 people are found in a truck container in Essex, England. A 25-year-old man from Northern Ireland is arrested on suspicion of murder.
  - Google announces that its 53-qubit "Sycamore" processor has achieved quantum supremacy. IBM disputes the claim.
- October 25 – Tourists visit the summit of Uluru (also known as Ayers Rock) for the last time, as a ban on climbing the famous rock in Australia's Northern Territory comes into effect.
- October 26 – The Amazon Catholic bishops synod proposes that married men be ordained as priests, which would reverse the Church's centuries-old discipline of celibacy.
- October 27 – U.S. President Donald Trump announces that the leader of the Islamic State of Iraq and the Levant, Abu Bakr al-Baghdadi, has been killed in a U.S. special forces operation. It is reported that al-Baghdadi detonated a suicide vest after being chased into a tunnel.
- October 30
  - Social media website Twitter bans all political advertising worldwide.
  - An earthquake of 6.5. M_{w} rocks the Philippine island of Mindanao two days after an earthquake killed at least five and left around 12,000 people homeless.
- October 31
  - A fire destroys much of the 500-year-old Japanese Shuri Castle, a UNESCO World Heritage Site.
  - A train catches fire near Rahim Yar Khan in Pakistan. The blaze, sparked by gas used by passengers cooking on board, kills at least 74 people.
  - Heavy rain and flooding leave 3 dead and 200,000 people are homeless in Beledweyne, Somalia. Meanwhile, 29 are dead and 29,000 homeless due to flooding in nearby Kenya.

=== November ===
- November 4
  - LeBarón and Langford families massacre: Nine Americans are killed when Mexican gang members open fire on their vehicles while driving to a wedding about 110 kilometres (70 mi) south of the Mexico–United States border.
  - Amnesty International alleges that Bangladesh killed 466 people in 2018 under the guise of an anti-drugs campaign in what appears to be a wave of extrajudicial executions.
  - The United States formally begins process to pull out of the Paris Agreement on climate change.
- November 5 – 11,000 scientists from around the world publish a study in the journal BioScience, warning "clearly and unequivocally that planet Earth is facing a climate emergency".
- November 6 – 2019 Fada N'Gourma attack: At least 37 people are killed and 60 others injured when gunmen attack a Canadian gold mining company convoy on a road in Burkina Faso.
- November 7 – Former Congolese rebel leader Bosco Ntaganda is sentenced to 30 years in prison for war crimes and crimes against humanity, the longest sentence ever handed down by the International Criminal Court.
- November 9
  - The Supreme Court of India awards a holy site in Ayodhya, Uttar Pradesh to Hindus, rejecting a Muslim claim. The move is likely to spur sectarian disputes.
  - Cyclone Bulbul kills seven in West Bengal, India and seven in Bangladesh. 2,000,000 people are evacuated.
- November 10 – 2019 Bolivian protests: Evo Morales and Álvaro García Linera resigns in response to fierce three-week long protests. Within hours, Adriana Salvatierra and Víctor Borda also tender their resignations, leading to a political crisis.
- November 11
  - A transit of Mercury occurs.
  - 2019–20 Hong Kong protests: A traffic officer shoots a youth in Sai Wan Ho during a city-wide strike. A man is also set on fire by protesters on the same day.
- November 12 – 2019 Bolivian protests: Jeanine Áñez took power as interim President of Bolivia amidst political crisis.
- November 13
  - Public impeachment hearings against U.S. President Donald Trump begin in the House of Representatives.
  - 2019–20 Hong Kong protests: The Chinese University of Hong Kong officially announces a premature end to the semester as a result of large-scale protests and civil unrest. Besides CUHK, several Hong Kong universities switch to online learning and suspend on-campus class. The Education Bureau in Hong Kong officially announces to close all schools in Hong Kong due to the ongoing protests.
- November 14 – Italy declares a state of emergency in Venice following record flooding.
- November 17 – 2019–20 Hong Kong protests: Police use tear gas and water cannons against protesters who try to break through cordons and reach The Hong Kong Polytechnic University, which is at the center of a week-long standoff between demonstrators and law enforcement. Protesters fight back with Molotov cocktails, arrows, and bricks.
- November 19 – Google enters the video game market with the launch of Stadia.
- November 20 – Maltese businessman Yorgen Fenech is arrested in connection with the assassination of journalist Daphne Caruana Galizia whilst trying to flee the island on his private yacht. His arrest triggers the beginning of the 2019 Maltese political crisis.
- November 21 – Israeli Prime Minister Benjamin Netanyahu is indicted on charges of bribery, fraud and breach of trust.
- November 23 – The last known Sumatran rhinoceros in Malaysia dies.
- November 23–December 7 – A non-binding independence referendum was held in Bougainville, an autonomous region of Papua New Guinea. Voters overwhelmingly voted for independence.
- November 24 – 2019 Busy Bee crash: A plane crashes shortly after takeoff in a densely populated area of Goma, Democratic Republic of the Congo, killing all 19 people on board and at least 10 more on the ground.
- November 25
  - The World Meteorological Organization reports that levels of heat-trapping greenhouse gases in the atmosphere have reached another new record high of 407.8 parts per million, with "no sign of a slowdown, let alone a decline."
  - IPv4 address exhaustion: The RIPE NCC, which is the official regional Internet registry (RIR) for Europe, officially announces that it has run out of IPv4 addresses.
- November 26
  - 2019 Albania earthquake: 51 people are killed and around 2,000 others injured in a 6.4-magnitude earthquake in northwestern Albania. The earthquake is the strongest to hit Albania in more than 40 years, and the world's deadliest earthquake in 2019.
  - 2019 Chilean protests: Human Rights Watch and Amnesty International issue reports on Chile's situation denouncing grave human rights violations, including excessive violence use and detention abuses by police forces. Among police brutality acts there are records of police agents firing non-lethal ammunition to protesters' faces against provider's regulations, resulting in more than 200 people with severe eye trauma and more than 50 requiring prosthetic eyes.
- November 27 – The U.S. Government passes the Hong Kong Human Rights and Democracy Act.

=== December ===
- December 1 – COVID-19 pandemic: First known human case of Coronavirus disease 2019, in Wuhan, Hubei, China.
- December 2 – Typhoon Kammuri hits the Philippines, causing the evacuation of 200,000 people, but without reports of injuries or serious damage.
- December 2–13 – The 2019 United Nations Climate Change Conference takes place in Madrid, Spain, after Chilean President Sebastián Piñera announced in October that his country could not host the conference due to political unrest in the country.
- December 5 – The 2019 Burundi landslide is reported to have caused at least 26 deaths.
- December 8 – A fire at a factory in Delhi, India, kills 43 people and injures at least 50 others.
- December 9
  - The World Anti-Doping Agency votes unanimously to ban Russia from international sport for four years for doping offences, meaning it will be excluded from the 2020 Summer Olympics in Tokyo, the 2022 Winter Olympics in Beijing and the 2022 World Cup in Qatar.
  - A volcano erupts on White Island in New Zealand, killing 22 people and injuring 25 others.
  - 2019 Chilean Air Force C-130 crash: A Chilean military transport aircraft crashes while en route to Base Presidente Eduardo Frei Montalva in Antarctica, killing all 38 people on board. The crash site is located on December 12.
- December 10 – Sanna Marin, at the age of 34, becomes the world's youngest serving prime minister after being selected to lead Finland's Social Democratic Party.
- December 11 – The World Trade Organization is left unable to intervene in trade disputes after the U.S. blocks the appointment of new panel members.
- December 12 – Boris Johnson and his Conservative Party win a landslide victory in the 2019 United Kingdom general election achieving a majority in the House of Commons of 80 seats.
- December 16 – Pope Francis abolishes pontifical secrecy in sex abuse cases; the move follows the Vatican's Meeting on the Protection of Minors in the Church months prior. The Pope also raises the definition of "child pornography" from 14 to 18 years old.
- December 17 – Shandong, China's first fully domestically built aircraft carrier, enters naval service.
- December 18
  - The CHEOPS space telescope, whose mission is to study the formation of extrasolar planets and determine their precise radius, likely density and internal structure, is launched.
  - The U.S. House of Representatives approves two articles of impeachment against President Trump, making him the third president to be impeached in the nation's history.
- December 19
  - Libya's Government of National Accord activates a cooperation accord with Turkey, allowing for a potential Turkish military intervention in the Second Libyan Civil War.
  - A locust plague devastates 173,000 acres (70,000 hectares) of crop and grazing land in Ethiopia and Somalia.
  - A court in the Philippines convicts Andal Ampatuan Jr., his brother Zaldy Ampatuan and 31 others including three members of the Ampatuan clan, of 57 counts of murder and sentences them to life imprisonment without parole for their role in the Maguindanao .
- December 20
  - The United States founds the United States Space Force, a branch of the United States Armed Forces dedicated to space warfare.
  - The Dutch Supreme Court affirms that the Dutch government is responsible for management of carbon dioxide emissions for the country and is bound to protect human rights. The ruling reiterated from the Court of Appeals is that "every country is responsible for its share" of emissions.
- December 23
  - Five men are sentenced to death and another three face 24 years in prison for their roles in the murder of dissident journalist and Washington Post columnist Jamal Khashoggi at the Saudi consulate in Istanbul.
  - 28 people are killed and 13 others injured after a bus plunges into a ravine on a winding road in South Sumatra.
- December 24 – Thousands of Muslims protest the December 20 burning of four mosques in the Amhara Region of Ethiopia.
- December 26 – An annular solar eclipse is visible from South Asia. This is a part of Saros 132.
- December 27 – Corporate defaults on corporate bonds in China reach a new record.
- December 28 – A truck bomb attributed to al-Shabaab kills at least 78 and wounds 125 in Mogadishu, Somalia.
- December 29
  - A report by the Multi-Sector Epidemic Response Committee (CMRE) indicates that 2,231 people have died so far in the 2018–20 Kivu Ebola epidemic in the Democratic Republic of the Congo.
  - The Taliban's ruling council agrees to a temporary cease-fire in Afghanistan, opening a door to a peace agreement with the United States.
- December 30 – Chinese authorities announce that He Jiankui, who claimed to have created the world's first genetically edited human babies, has been sentenced to three years in prison and fined 3 million yuan (US$430,000) for his genetic research efforts.
- December 31
  - Iraqi militiamen and protesters breach the front gate checkpoint of the United States embassy in Baghdad following a U.S. military operation that targeted an Iraqi militia on December 29.
  - COVID-19 pandemic: First official reports of "viral pneumonia" from the Wuhan Municipal Health Commission.

== Nobel Prizes ==
Nobel medal

- Chemistry – John B. Goodenough, M. Stanley Whittingham, and Akira Yoshino
- Economics – Abhijit Banerjee, Esther Duflo, and Michael Kremer
- Literature – Peter Handke
- Peace – Abiy Ahmed
- Physics – James Peebles, Michel Mayor, and Didier Queloz
- Physiology or Medicine – William Kaelin Jr., Peter J. Ratcliffe, and Gregg L. Semenza

== See also ==
- List of International observances § Years

=== Overviews ===
- 2019 national electoral calendar
- 2019 United States elections

=== Specific events and situations ===
- 2019 Venezuelan presidential crisis
- Brexit
- Impeachment inquiry against Donald Trump
- 2019 British prorogation controversy
- 2019 Italian government crisis
- Conte II Cabinet
