= List of elections in 2019 =

The following elections were scheduled to occur in 2019. The International Foundation for Electoral Systems has a calendar of upcoming elections around the world, and the National Democratic Institute also maintains a calendar of elections in countries in which the organization works.

== International ==
- 2019 United Nations Security Council election 7 June 2019

== Africa ==
- 2019 Puntland presidential election 8 January 2019
- South Africa:
  - 2019 Tshwane mayoral election 12 February 2019
  - 2019 Gauteng provincial election 8 May 2019
  - 2019 South African general election 8 May 2019
  - 2019 Western Cape provincial election 8 May 2019
- 2019 Nigerian general election 23 February 2019
- 2019 Senegalese presidential election 24 February 2019
- 2019 Guinea-Bissau legislative election 10 March 2019
- 2019 Comorian presidential election 24 March 2019
- 2019 Egyptian constitutional referendum 19 to 22 April 2019
- 2019 Beninese parliamentary election 28 April 2019
- 2019 Malawian general election 21 May 2019
- 2019 Malagasy parliamentary election 27 May 2019
- 2019 Mauritanian presidential election 22 June 2019
- Tunisia:
  - 2019 Tunisian presidential election 15 September and 13 October 2019
  - 2019 Tunisian parliamentary election 6 October 2019
- 2019 Liberian by-elections, 29 July and 5 October 2019
- 2019 Mozambican general election 15 October 2019
- 2019 Botswana general election 23 October 2019
- 2019 Mauritian general election 7 November 2019
- 2019 Sidama Region referendum 20 November 2019
- 2019 Namibian general election 27 November 2019
- 2019 Guinea-Bissau presidential election 25 November and 29 December 2019
- 2019 Algerian presidential election 12 December 2019

== Asia ==
- Philippines:
  - 2019 Bangsamoro autonomy plebiscite 21 January and 6 February 2019
  - 2019 Philippine general election 13 May 2019
  - 2019 Philippine House of Representatives elections 13 May 2019
  - 2019 Philippine Senate election 13 May 2019
  - 2019 Philippine gubernatorial elections 13 May 2019
- North Korea:
  - 2019 North Korean local elections 21 July 2019
  - 2019 North Korean parliamentary election 10 March 2019
- 2019 Taiwanese by-elections 16 March 2019
- 2019 Thai general election 24 March 2019
- 2019 Turkish local elections 31 March 2019
- 2019 South Korean by-elections 3 April 2019
- 2019 Maldivian parliamentary election 6 April 2019
- 2019 Indian general election 11 April to 19 May 2019
- 2019 Indonesian general election 17 April 2019
- 2019 Qatari municipal elections 16 April 2019
- 2019 Kazakh presidential election 9 June 2019
- 2019 Japanese House of Councillors election 21 July 2019
- 2019 Afghan presidential election 28 September 2019
- 2019 Sri Lankan presidential election 16 November 2019
- 2019 Hong Kong local elections 24 November 2019
- 2019–20 Uzbek parliamentary election 22 December 2019 (first round)

== Europe ==
- 2019 Abkhazian presidential election 25 August and 8 September 2019
- Switzerland:
  - 2019 Swiss referendums 10 February and 19 May 2019
  - 2019 Swiss federal election 20 October 2019
- 2019 Moldovan parliamentary election 24 February 2019
- 2019 Moldovan local elections 20 October 2019
- 2019 Sardinian regional election 24 February 2019
- 2019 Estonian parliamentary election 3 March 2019
- Malta:
  - 2019 Maltese presidential election 5 March 2019
  - 2019 Maltese local elections 25 May 2019
- 2019 Liechtenstein local elections 24 March 2019 and 14 April 2019
- 2019 Montenegro municipal elections 3 March 2019
- 2019 Latvian presidential election 29 May 2019
- 2019 Slovak presidential election 16 and 30 March 2019
- 2019 Dutch provincial elections 20 March 2019
- 2019 Turkish local elections 31 March 2019
  - June 2019 Istanbul mayoral election 23 June 2019
- 2019 Ukrainian presidential election 31 March and 21 April 2019
- United Kingdom:
  - 2019 By-elections to the House of Lords
  - 2019 Newport West by-election 4 April 2019
  - 2019 United Kingdom local elections 2 May 2019
  - 2019 Peterborough by-election 6 June 2019
  - 2019 Brecon and Radnorshire by-election 1 August 2019
  - 2019 United Kingdom general election 12 December 2019
- Czech Republic:
  - 2019 Prague 9 by-election 5 and 6 April 2019
- Andorra:
  - 2019 Andorran parliamentary election 7 April 2019
  - 2019 Andorran local elections 15 December 2019
- 2019 Finnish parliamentary election 14 April 2019
- 2019 North Macedonian presidential election 21 April and 5 May 2019
- 2019 Italian by-elections, 20 January 2019
- Spain:
  - April 2019 Spanish general election, 28 April 2019
  - 2019 Valencian regional election 28 April 2019
  - 2019 Spanish local elections 26 May 2019
  - 2019 Spanish regional elections 26 May 2019
  - November 2019 Spanish general election, 10 November 2019
- 2019 Lithuanian presidential election 12 May 2019 and 26 May 2019
- 2019 European Parliament election 23–26 May 2019
- Ireland:
  - 2019 Irish local elections 24 May 2019
  - 2019 Irish divorce referendum 24 May 2019
- Belgium:
  - 2019 Belgian federal election 26 May 2019
  - 2019 Belgian regional elections 26 May 2019
- Greece:
  - 2019 Greek local elections 26 May 2019 and 2 June 2019
  - 2019 Greek legislative election 7 July 2019
- 2019 Kazakh presidential election 9 June 2019
- 2019 Latvian presidential election 29 May 2019
- 2019 Sammarinese referendum 2 June 2019
- 2019 Danish general election 5 June 2019
- 2019 Albanian local elections 30 June 2019
- 2019 Ukrainian parliamentary election 21 July 2019
- Germany:
  - 2019 Bremen state election 26 May 2019
  - Local elections in Baden-Württemberg, Bremen, Brandenburg, Hamburg, Mecklenburg-Vorpommern, Rheinland-Pfalz, Saarland, Sachsen, Saxony-Anhalt and Thuringia on 26 May 2019
  - 2019 Saxony state election 1 September 2019
  - 2019 Brandenburg state election 1 September 2019
  - 2019 Thuringian state election 27 October 2019
- Russia:
  - 2019 By-elections to the State Duma, 8 September 2019
  - 2019 Russian elections, 8 September 2019
- 2019 Norwegian local elections 9 September 2019
- Portugal:
  - 2019 Madeiran regional election 22 September 2019
  - 2019 Portuguese legislative election 6 October 2019
- 2019 Austrian legislative election, 29 September 2019
- 2019 Kosovan parliamentary election 6 October 2019
- 2019 Polish parliamentary election 13 October 2019
- 2019 Gibraltar general election 17 October 2019
- 2019 Bulgarian local elections 27 October 2019
- 2019 Romanian presidential election 10 and 24 November 2019
- 2019 Belarusian parliamentary election 17 November 2019
- 2019 Sammarinese general election 8 December 2019
- 2019 Croatian presidential election 22 December 2019 and 5 January 2020

== North America ==
- 2019 Salvadoran presidential election 3 February 2019
- 2019 Cuban constitutional referendum, 24 February 2019
- 2019 British Virgin Islands general election, 25 February 2019
- Canada (selection):
  - 30th Alberta general election 16 April 2019
  - 2019 Prince Edward Island general election 23 April 2019
  - 50th Newfoundland and Labrador general election 16 May 2019
  - 42nd Manitoba general election 10 September 2019
  - 43rd Canadian federal election 21 October 2019
- 2019 Panamanian general election 5 May 2019
- 2019 Belizean territorial dispute referendum 8 May 2019
- 2019 Guatemalan general election 16 June and 11 August 2019
- United States (selection):
  - 2019 United States gubernatorial elections 5 November 2019
- 2019 Montserratian general election 18 November 2019
- 2019 Trinidadian local elections 2 December 2019
- 2019 Dominican general election 6 December 2019

== South America ==
- 2019 Bolivian general election 20 October 2019
- 2019 Argentine general election 27 October 2019
- 2019 Ecuadorian local elections 24 March 2019
- 2019 Uruguayan general election 27 October and 24 November 2019

== Middle East ==
- Israel:
  - April 2019 Israeli legislative election, 9 April 2019
  - September 2019 Israeli legislative election, 17 September 2019
- 2019 Emirati parliamentary election, 5 October 2019
- 2019 Omani general election, 27 October 2019

== Oceania ==
- Micronesia:
  - 2019 Micronesian parliamentary election 5 March 2019
  - 2019 Micronesian Constitutional Convention election 5 November 2019
- Australia:
  - 2019 New South Wales state election 23 March 2019
  - 2019 Tasmanian Legislative Council periodic election 4 May 2019
  - 2019 Australian federal election 18 May 2019
  - 2019 Enfield state by-election 9 February 2019, South Australian Government
- 2019 Solomon Islands general election 3 April 2019
- 2019 Nauruan parliamentary election 24 August 2019
- 2019 New Zealand local elections 12 October 2019
- 2019 Marshallese general election 18 November 2019
- 2019 Bougainvillean independence referendum 23 November 2019
