= 2019 general election =

2019 general election may refer to:

== Africa ==
- 2019 Botswana general election
- 2019 Guinea-Bissau legislative election
- 2019 Namibian general election
- 2019 Nigerian general election
- 2019 Malagasy parliamentary election
- 2019 Malawian general election
- 2019 Mauritian general election
- 2019 Mozambican general election
- 2019 South African general election

== Americas ==
- 2019 Argentine general election
- 2019 Bolivian general election
- 2019 Canadian federal election
- 2019 Dominican general election
- 2019 Guatemalan general election
- 2019 Guyanese general election
- 2019 Panamanian general election
- 2019 Uruguayan general election

== Asia ==
- 2019 Indian general election
- April 2019 Israeli legislative election
- September 2019 Israeli legislative election
- 2019 Philippine general election
- 2019 Thai general election

== Europe ==
- 2019 Danish general election
- 2019 Portuguese legislative election
- 2019 Finnish parliamentary election
- 2019 Spanish general election
- 2019 United Kingdom general election
- 2019 Greek general election

== Oceania ==
- 2019 Australian federal election
- 2019 Indonesian general election
- 2019 Nauruan parliamentary election
- 2019 Solomon Islands general election

== See also ==
- List of elections in 2019
- 2019 supranational electoral calendar
- 2019 national electoral calendar
- 2019 local electoral calendar
