= 2024 Uruguayan constitutional referendum =

- 27 October 2024

Amendment to Article 67 of the constitution to reform social security.
Yes	40.76%
No	59.24%

Amendment to Article 11 of the Constitution to allow police searches at night
Yes	41.39%
No	58.61%

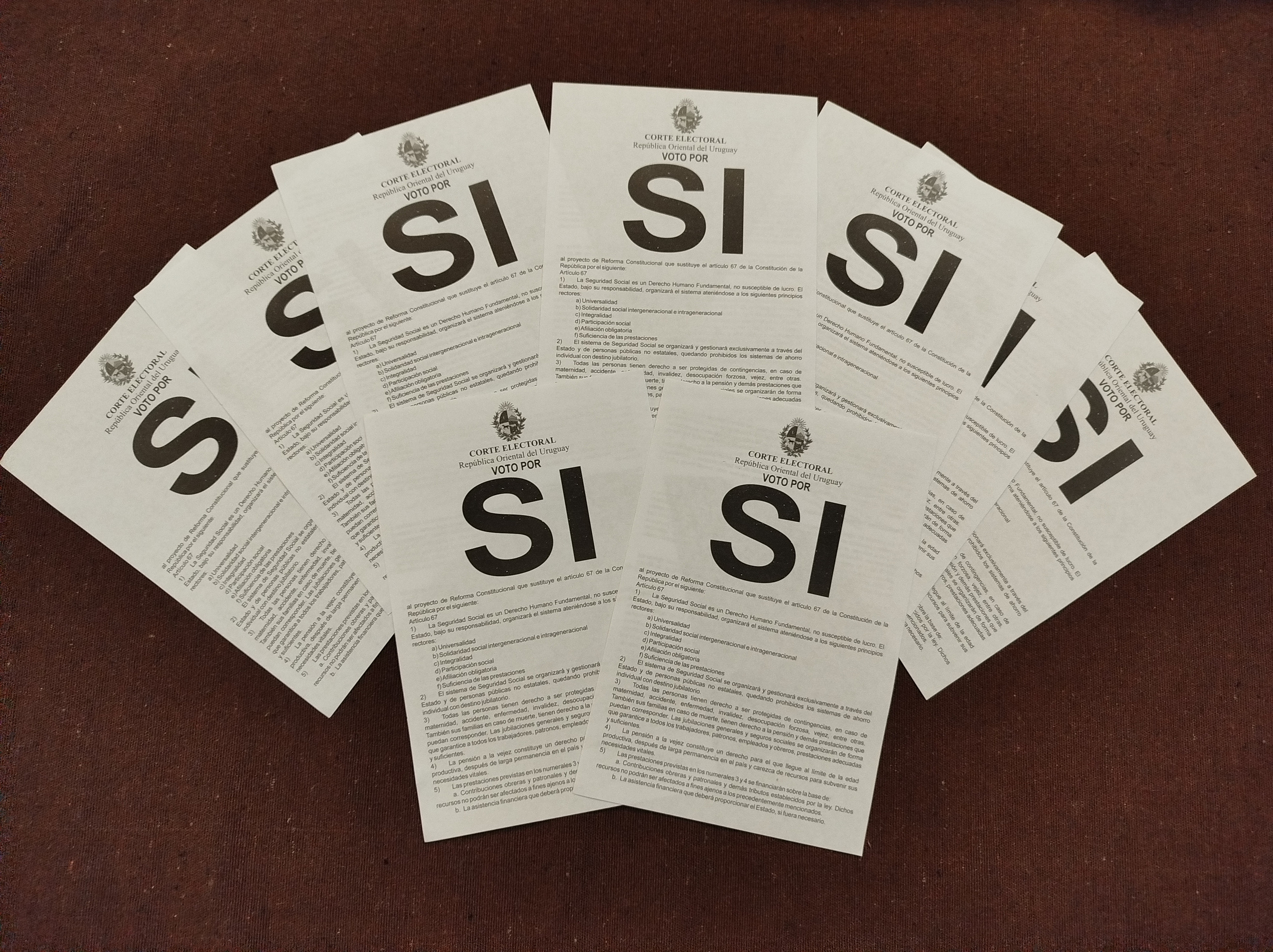
Social security ballot papers

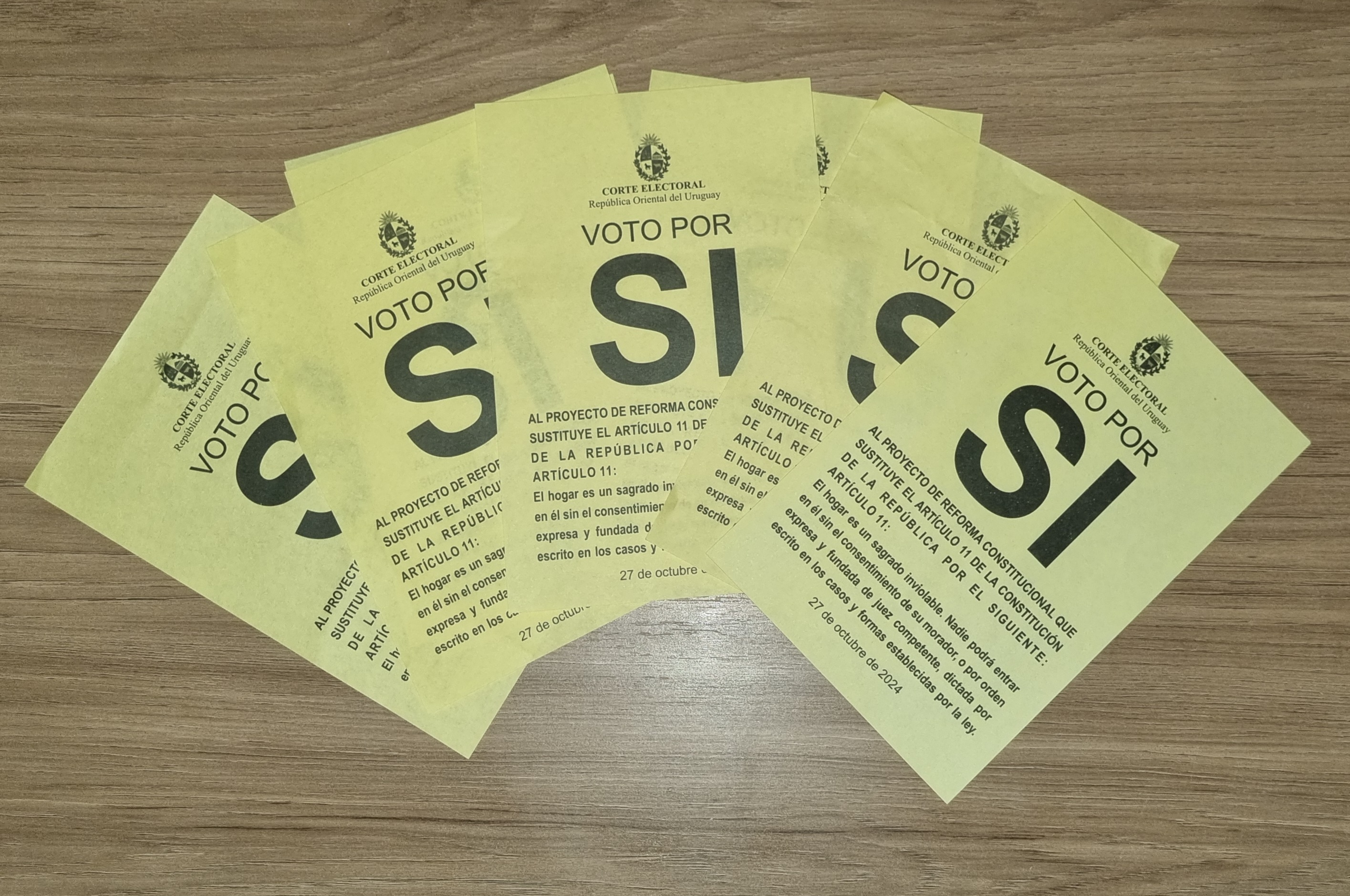
Nighttime police raids ballot papers

Two constitutional referendums were held in Uruguay on 27 October 2024 alongside a general election. Voters were asked whether they approved of constitutional amendments related to social security and night time police raids.

== Background ==
=== Social security ===
In April 2024 over 400,000 signatures from citizens were brought to the consideration of the Electoral Court for a plebiscite to be authorized. Originally conceived by its advocates with the purpose of overhauling the social security system, if approved by more than 50% of voters, the US$23 billion scheme backed by the country's powerful leftist unions would lower the retirement age, boost payouts and transfer Uruguayans’ privately managed savings to a government-run trust.

=== Nighttime police raids ===
The Constitution of Uruguay of 1967 authorizes police raids only during the daytime. This rare restriction, taken almost word for word from the 1830 constitution, is as of 2024 only found in three other countries: Guatemala, Mozambique, and Cape Verde. It is criticised as being advantageous for drug traffickers and organized crime groups by those supporting stronger security measures. The constitutional referendum rejected in 2019 included a provision to allow night raids on the condition of "well-founded suspicion that a crime is in progress".

The issue was raised again in the 2019 Parliament. The question of a constitutional amendment was submitted for debate on 20 October, 2023, by a National Party senator, Carlos Camy, who proposed to make the conditions for a night raid the same as those in force for day-time raids. Two months later, on 20 December, the proposal was submitted to the General Assembly. The lower house representatives and upper house senators voted in favour of the proposal, with the exception of the Broad Front; the proposal was successful, with 71 of 129 representatives and senators supporting it. The Broad Front criticized the move as a "smoke bomb" that wouldn't fix core issues, and noted that the 2019 referendum had been unsuccessful.

The amendment was submitted on the 28th to the Electoral Court, which decided the next year, in the summer of 2024, to hold the constitutional referendum on the 27 October, the same day as the general election.

== Campaign ==
Both leading presidential candidates spoke out against the social security proposal amid concerns on the reception of the global markets.

The proposal for night-time police raids received support from almost all parties, with the only exception of the leftist Broad Front.

== Results ==
Both referendums failed to reach the required threshold of over 50% of total votes in favor. The referendum on social security was reported to have failed because of the main parties' leaders rejecting it.

2024 Uruguayan constitutional referendum
Issue	Social security	Nighttime police raids
Yes	947,381 (40.76%)	961,926 (41.39%)
No	1,376,766 (59.24%)	1,362,221 (58.61%)
Valid votes	2,324,147	
Invalid or blank votes	119,654	
Cast votes	2,443,801 (89.62% turnout)	
Registered voters	2,726,777	
