= Constitution of Cuba =

Fundamental law of Cuba

Constitution of the Republic of Cuba
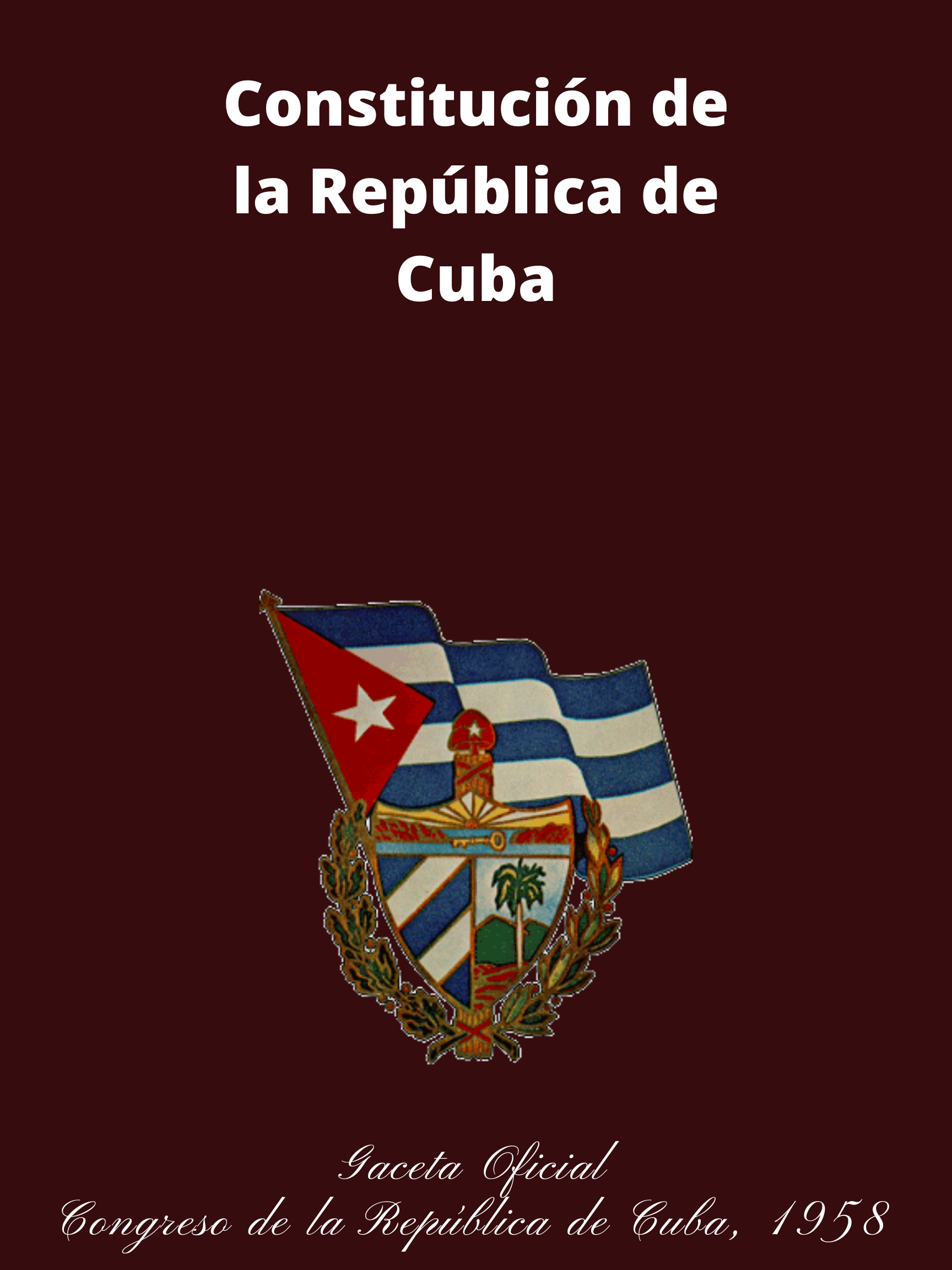
- Poster of the 1958 constitution

Overview
- Original title: Constitución de la República de Cuba
- Jurisdiction: Republic of Cuba
- Ratified: 24 February 2019
- Date effective: 10 April 2019
- System: Unitary Marxist–Leninist one-party socialist republic
- Executive: President; Prime Minister
- Judiciary: People's Supreme Court
- Federalism: Unitary state
- Electoral college: No
- Last amended: 2019
- Signatories: National Assembly of People's Power
- Supersedes: 1976 Constitution of Cuba

Even before attaining its independence, Cuba had several constitutions either proposed or adopted by insurgents as governing documents for territory they controlled during their wars against Spain. Cuba has had several constitutions since winning its independence. The first constitution since the Cuban Revolution was drafted in 1976 and has since been amended. In 2018, Cuba became engaged in a major revision of its constitution. The current communist state constitution was then enacted in 2019.

== Early models ==
Events in early 19th-century Spain prompted a general concern with constitutions throughout Spain's overseas possessions. In 1808, both Ferdinand VII of Spain and his predecessor and father, Charles IV of Spain, resigned their claims to the throne in favor of Napoleon Bonaparte, who in turn passed the crown to his brother Joseph Bonaparte. In the ensuing Peninsular War, the Spanish waged a war of independence against the French Empire. On 19 March 1812, the Cortes Generales in refuge in Cádiz adopted the Spanish Constitution of 1812, which established a constitutional monarchy and eliminated many basic institutions that privileged some groups over others. The Cortes included representatives from throughout the Spanish Empire, including Cuba.

Several models of constitutional government were proposed for Cuba. José Agustín Caballero offered "a charter for Cuban autonomy under Spanish rule" in Diario de la Habana in 1810, elaborated as the Project for an Autonomous Government in Cuba in 1811. The next year, Bayamo attorney Joaquín Infante living in Caracas wrote his Constitutional Project for the Island of Cuba. He reconciled his liberal political principles with slavery in Cuba, noting that slavery existed in the United States alongside republican government. Spanish authorities imprisoned him for his writings. In 1821, Félix Varela represented Cuba in the Cortes Generales of Spain during a short period when the Constitution of 1812 was revived. He joined in a petition to the Crown for the independence of Spain's Latin American colonies, supported by his Project of Instruction for the Politically and Economically Autonomous Government of the Overseas Provinces.

== Guáimaro Constitution ==
The Guáimaro Constitution was the governing document written by the idealistic and politically liberal faction in the insurgency that contested Spanish colonial rule in Cuba and imposed on Carlos Manuel de Céspedes, the conservative who claimed leadership of the independence movement. It was nominally in effect from 1869 to 1878 during the Ten Years' War against Spain, governing the Republic of Cuba in Arms.

== Baraguá Constitution ==
After the Spanish took re-possession of the island in 1878, the Baraguá Constitution was written in a brief attempt at re-igniting the war, re-establishing the Republic of Cuba in Arms with Manuel de Jesús Calvar as President.

== Jimaguayú Constitution ==
Two ad hoc constitutions were adopted in the course of Cuba's last fight for independence from Spain (1895–1898). On 16 September 1895, delegates representing the rebel forces adopted a constitution in Jimaguayú, the Constitution of the Republic of Cuba in Arms, and set it to be reviewed in two years by a representative assembly. It described relations between civil and military authority. It named key officials and outlined the requirements of a peace treaty with Spain. In September 1897, the assembly met in La Yaya, adopted a new document on 30 October, and named a new president and vice-president.

== La Yaya Constitution ==
La Yaya Constitution written in 1897 was the last constitution before the defeat of the Spanish. The principal notable passages of this constitution on equal civil rights, the right of suffrage and the rights governing equal education for all Cubans were written by General José Braulio Alemán Urquía. This constitution was used as template for the 1901 Constitution.

== 1901 Constitution ==
The 1901 Constitution, was Cuba's first as an independent state. It incorporated eight principles set out in the Platt Amendment without which United States troops would not have been withdrawn from Cuba, including the clause that the U.S. has the right to intervene in Cuba's affairs to protect its independence and guarantee the stability of its government. All but one of the Platt Amendment principles remained in force until a treaty between Cuba and the U.S., the Cuban–American Treaty of Relations (1934), negotiated as part of Franklin D. Roosevelt's Good Neighbor policy toward Latin America, took effect on 9 June 1934, leaving the U.S. only its right to a permanent lease to its Guantanamo Naval Station.

== 1940 Constitution ==
During the presidency of Federico Laredo Brú, a Constitutional Assembly was elected in November 1939 to write a new constitution. The Assembly debated publicly for six months and adopted the constitution at the Capitol in Havana. It was signed by the delegates on 1 July 1940, and took effect on 10 October 1940. It provided for land reform, public education, universal healthcare, minimum wage, and other progressive ideas. The constitution abolished capital punishment and established as national policy restrictions on the size of land holdings and an end to common ownership of sugar plantations and sugar mills, but these principles were never translated into legislation. The constitution ordained a presidency and a bicameral congress, both with a four-year tenure, with a ban on direct re-elections to the office of president (though non-consecutive re-election would be tolerated; similar to the current constitution of Chile) with executive power shared with a new, separate office of Prime Minister of Cuba, to be nominated by the president. Fulgencio Batista suspended parts of this constitution after seizing power in 1952. It was completely suspended after the Cuban revolution.

== 1976 Constitution ==
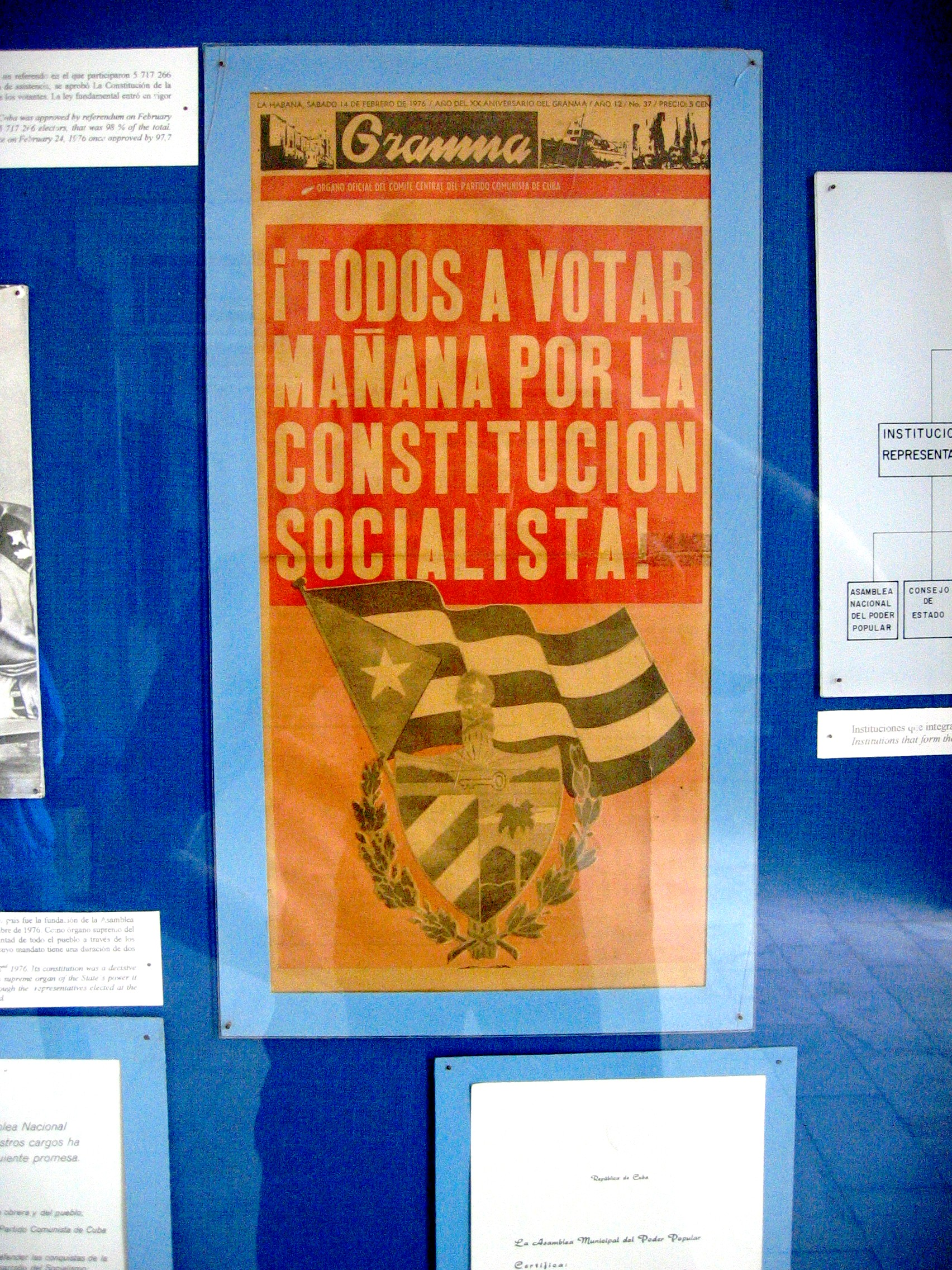
14 February 1976 edition of Granma reading "Everybody to vote tomorrow for the socialist constitution."

After 16 years of non-constitutional government from 1959 to 1975, the revolutionary government of Cuba sought to institutionalize the revolution by putting a new constitution to a popular vote. The Constitution of 1976, modeled after the 1936 Soviet Constitution, was adopted by referendum on 15 February 1976, in which it was approved by 99.02% of voters, in a 98% turnout. It took effect on 24 February 1976. This constitution called for a centralized control of the market and re-committed the state to providing its citizens with access to free education and health care, as in the 1940 constitution. Article 53 gave citizens freedom of speech, and Article 54 gave citizens the right to assemble.

The dissolution of the Soviet Union and the Eastern Bloc plunged Cuba into an era of economic crisis known as the Special Period in Time of Peace. In response, the constitution was amended in 1992 to remove certain limitations on foreign investment and grant foreign corporations a limited right to own property on the island if they established joint ventures with the government. Another amendment established that Cuba is a secular state rather than an atheist state, prompting an expansion of local participation in religious observance, increased social service work on the part of sectarian international charities, and public recognition of religious pluralism. In 2002, the constitution was amended to stipulate that the socialistic system was permanent and irrevocable.

== 2019 Constitution ==
On 14 July 2018, a Cuban Communist Party task force drafted a new constitutional text, then given to a National Assembly commission headed by Party First Secretary Raúl Castro to assess, refine, and forward the new draft constitution to the National Assembly plenary. The reforms were seen as part of the attempt to modernize the Cuban government. The draft contained 87 new articles, increasing the total from 137 to 229. Among the reforms were the following:

- The recognition of private property under heavy regulation.
- The restoration of the positions of President and Prime Minister of Cuba as posts separate from the President of the Council of State, and removal of the latter being simultaneously President of the Council of Ministers.
- The transfer of head of Council of State to the President of the National Assembly.
- The position of mayor being added to that of president of a municipal assembly.
- The creation of a requirement for presidential-appointed Provincial Governors and Lieutenant Governors to be ratified by local municipal governments.
- The acknowledgement of climate change and its threat.
- The establishment of provincial councils made up of municipal leaders.
- The creation of a two consecutive five-year term limit imposed on the president.
- Defining marriage as "a social and legal institution" and "one form of family organization" (formerly included legalization of same-sex marriage).
- Extending the terms of municipal council delegates to five years.
- Banning discrimination based on gender, race, ethnic origin, sexual orientation, gender identity, or disability.
- The restoration of a presumption of innocence in the justice system, last provided for in the 1940 constitution.

The new constitution was presented to the National Assembly of People's Power by secretary of the Council of State Homero Acosta for approval on 21 July 2018 before being slated to a national referendum. The National Assembly then approved the new constitution on 22 July 2018, a day ahead of schedule. It was announced that a popular consultation which allows citizen input for potential amendments to the text of the proposed constitution would start on 13 August and conclude on 15 November.

It was announced that 135,000 meetings would be held during the popular consultation. Each of these would be run by 7,600 two-person teams who would receive specialized training. Cuban exiles were invited to take part in the meetings. Following consideration of amendments, a referendum was held to pass the Constitution on 24 February 2019, succeeding with 86.85% of the popular vote. The popular consultation began as scheduled on 13 August 2018, in tandem with the 92nd birthday of the late Cuban President Fidel Castro. The popular consultation concluded as scheduled on 15 November 2018. On 1 December 2018, Granma Newspaper reported that the Cuban Parliament would be summoned to vote on proposed amendments to the new Constitution on 21 December.

The new constitution was debated at the 8th Plenum of the Communist Party of Cuba's Central Committee which took place between 12 and 13 December 2018. At the meeting, the amended draft of the proposed constitution was drawn up by a group commissioned by the National Assembly of People's Power. However, details of what was amended would not be made public until it was approved by the National Assembly. On 18 December 2018, it was revealed that one of the changes to the new constitution which would have paved the way for same sex marriage was dropped. On 20 December 2018, another change to the new Cuban Constitution was dropped and its language once again reinserts direction to building a communist society. On 21 December 2018, the Cuba National Assembly approved the amended constitution, completing the final step for a referendum. On 24 February 2019, the new constitution was approved by 90.15% of voters, with a turnout of 84%. On 7 March, it was announced that the National Assembly would meet 10 April 2019 to determine the timeframe of when the new constitution would go into effect. On 28 March, it was announced the Council of State had held a meeting on 25 March and decided that the new constitution would be proclaimed by the National Assembly on 10 April. Upon being proclaimed, the new constitution would be adopted.

The new constitution was proclaimed as scheduled on 10 April 2019. After being proclaimed, the Constitution of Cuba was published in the Official Gazette of the Republic, ensuring its entry into force. It was also announced that new laws enforcing the constitutional reform of the judicial system must be enacted within 18 months. This includes, among other things, the enactment of presumption of innocence in criminal cases and introduction of habeas corpus. An electoral law which would enforce the change in the structure of government in Cuba also must be enacted within six months. Within the following three months, the National Assembly would elect a president of the country, who must then appoint provincial governors and a prime minister, a new post separating the role of head of state from the role of head of government.

== See also ==
- Constitutional economics
- Constitutionalism
- Constitutional law
- Cuban law
- Censorship in Cuba
