= 1976 Cuban constitutional referendum =

- 15 February 1976
- Results by province

Results
Choice	Votes	%
Yes	5,473,534	99.02%
No	54,070	0.98%
Valid votes	5,527,604	98.65%
Invalid or blank votes	75,369	1.35%
Total votes	5,602,973	100.00%
Registered voters/turnout	5,717,266	98%

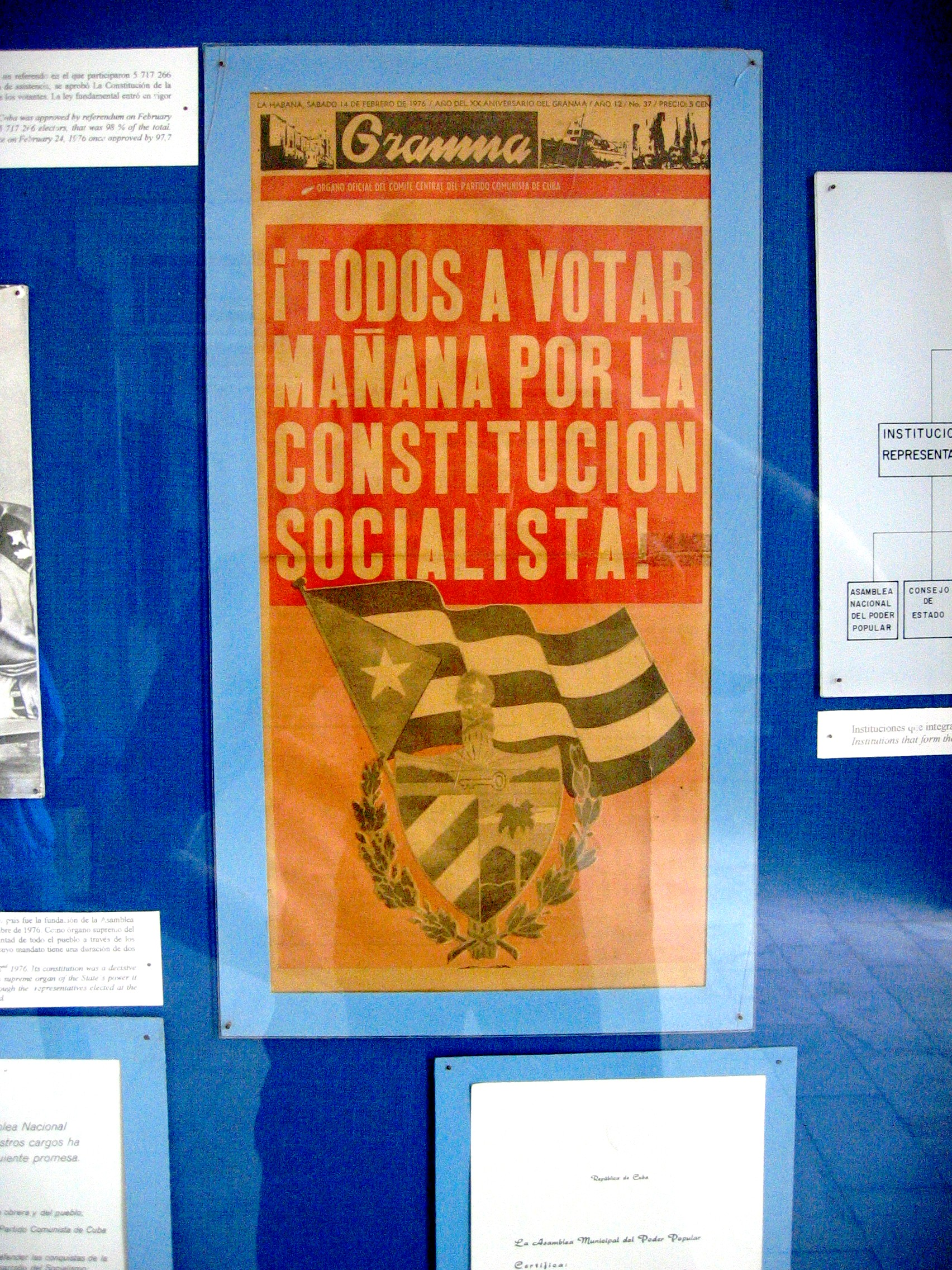
Granma front page of 14 February 1976, asking for the affirmative vote in the referendum.

A constitutional referendum was held in Cuba on 15 February 1976, the first nationwide vote on the island since the Cuban Revolution. The new constitution was reportedly discussed at grass-roots level by 6,216,000 citizens, resulting in 60 of the 141 articles being modified. It was reportedly approved by 99.02% of voters with a turnout of 98%.

== Results ==
Choice	Votes	%
For	5,473,534	99.02
Against	54,070	0.98
Total	5,527,604	100.00
Valid votes	5,527,604	98.65
Invalid/blank votes	75,369	1.35
Total votes	5,602,973	100.00
Registered voters/turnout	5,717,266	98.00
Source: Direct Democracy
