= José Braulio Alemán =

Cuban politician (1864–1930)

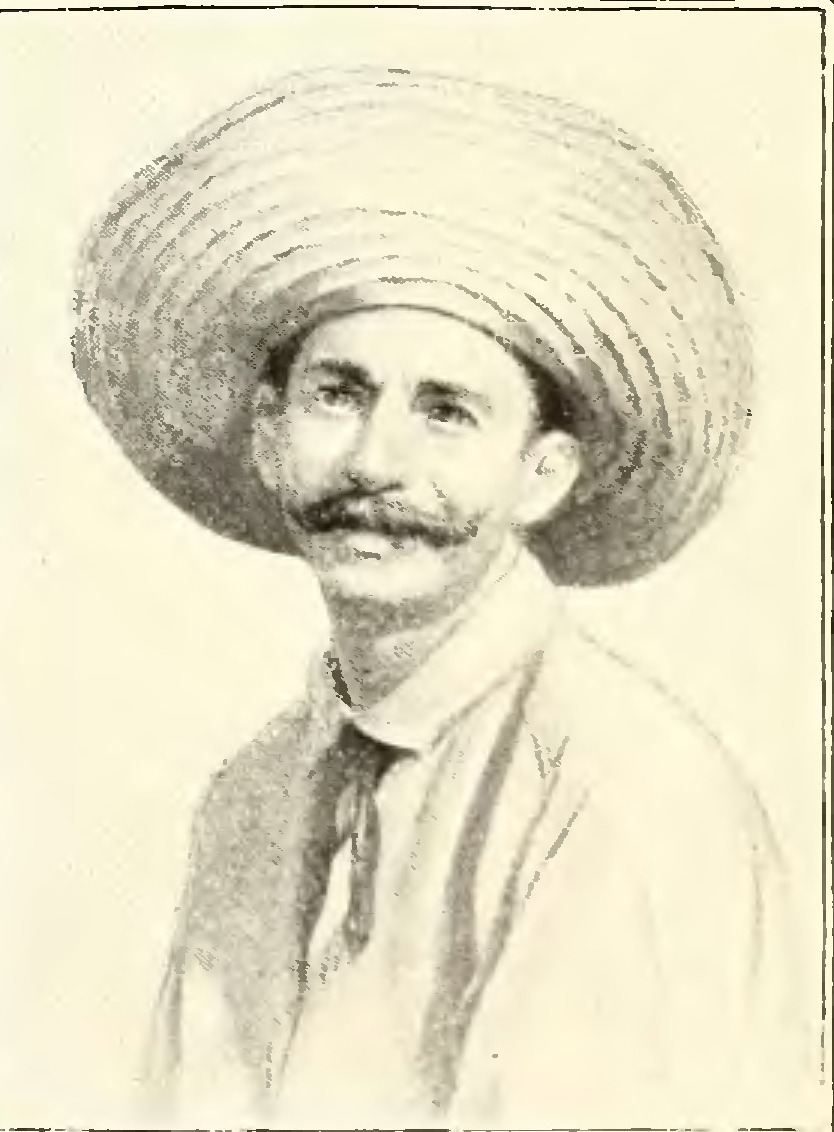
- Born: José Braulio Alemán Urquía; March 23, 1866; Santa Clara, Cuba
- Died: January 15, 1930 (aged 63); Havana, Cuba
- Occupations: Governor of a province, major general, politician, journalist
- Known for: Principal author of the Cuban Constitution of 1897

Gen. José Braulio Cástulo Alemán Urquía (23 March 1866 – 15 January 1930), was a Cuban brigadier general in the Spanish–American War, promoted to major general after the war. He also worked as a politician, lawyer and journalist, and was the Governor of the province of Santa Clara (or Las Villas) and the Minister of Public Instruction and Fine Arts of Cuba.

General Alemán was the principal author of the Constitution of Cuba proclaimed at La Yaya in 1897. This Constitution was used as template for the 1901 Constitution of the new Republic of Cuba.

== Biography ==
He studied law, but he did not graduate. He was a journalist who owned two newspapers at Santa Clara, Cuba in the province of Las Villas, he was incarcerated several times for articles written in favor of Cuba's independence. He was a key player in the fight against the Spanish, and the liberation of Cuba. Joining the fight for liberation from Spain he was soon promoted from colonel to brigader general. It was Alemán who served as prosecutor in the famous Morote trial for espionage, and treason against the burgeoning republic. Alemán is remembered as the principal author of the Cuban Constitution written at La Yaya while still at arms against the Spanish in 1897. At the end of the war during the American occupation he was one of the very few dignitaries who voted against the Platt Amendment.

Promoted to Major General after the war, Alemán served first as Governor and later as Senator for the province of Las Villas. He later became the Minister of Education for the newly established Republic of Cuba. As Minister of Education he founded the first Agricultural Schools, the first Institutes of Commerce, the first Sports & Physical Education Institute, and the School of Fine Arts at Santiago de Cuba. He also created the first night schools for adults, the first schools for Languages, and the Technical School of Rancho Boyeros in La Habana, Cuba. He was also instrumental in the partial reorganization of the University of Havana.

He was later appointed as Ambassador to Mexico where he was recognized for his beliefs in helping the native Indian poor and downtrodden. Alemán was an advocate for equal civil rights for all Cubans and for the right of suffrage. A statesman who was loved by his contemporaries, and the people of Cuba.

At his passing in 1930 all flags in the nation were flown at half mast, and the President of Cuba, all his Cabinet Ministers, several foreign dignitaries and more than 100,000 citizens attended his funeral procession.
