= 2019 supranational electoral calendar =

List of supranational elections in 2019

Supranational elections held in 2019.

== May ==
- 5 May: Central American Parliament, Panama
- 23–26 May: European Union, European Parliament

== June ==
- 16 June: Central American Parliament, Guatemala
