= 2019 Tshwane mayoral election =

Indirect election in Tshwane, South Africa

- 12 February 2019
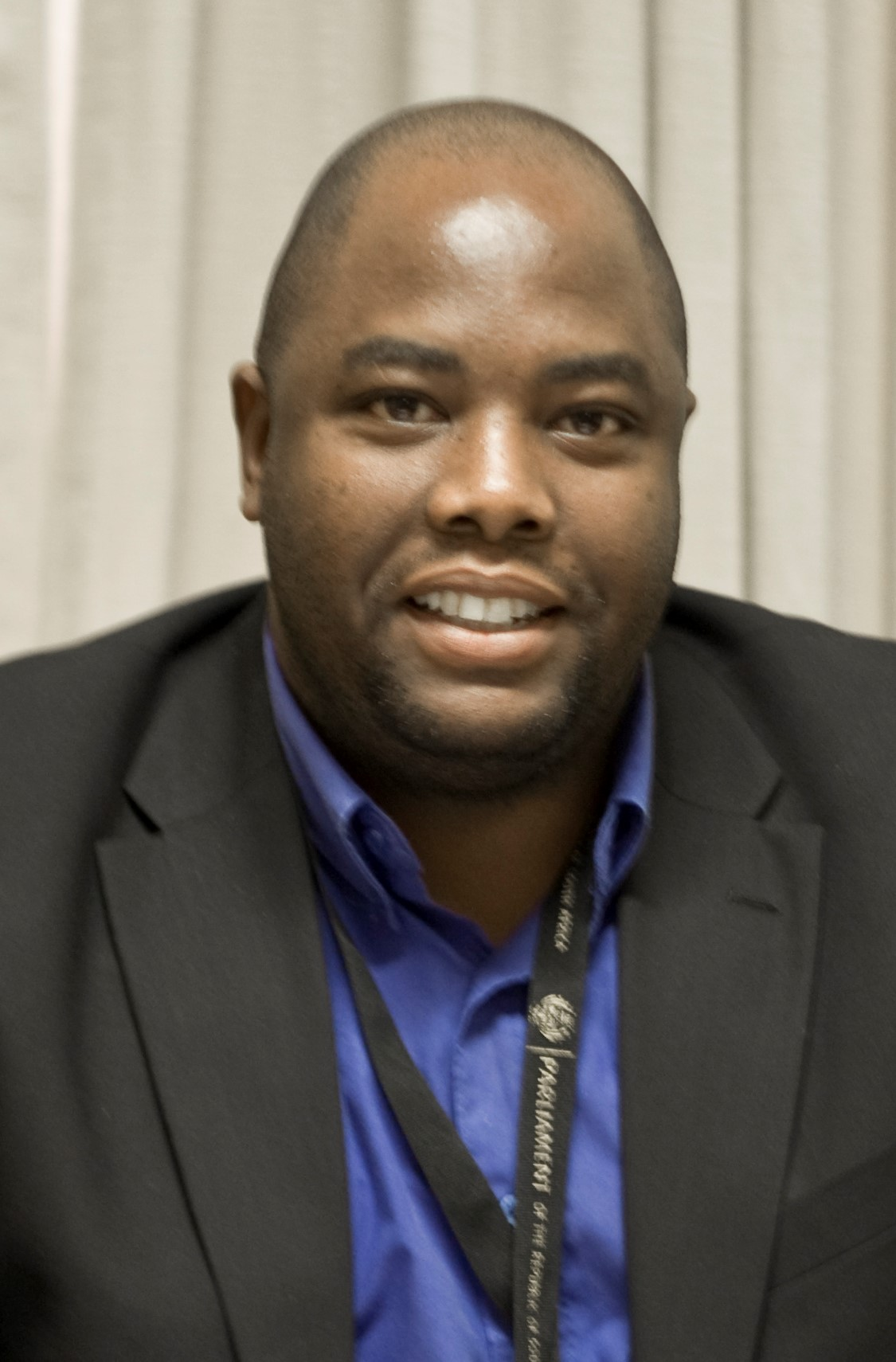
| Nominee | Stevens Mokgalapa |
| Party | DA |
| Electoral vote | Unopposed |
Mayor before election
Solly Msimanga
DA
Elected mayor
Stevens Mokgalapa
DA

An Indirect mayoral election occurred on 12 February 2019 in the Tshwane City Council to determine the successor of Solly Msimanga as Mayor of Tshwane. Msimanga announced in January 2019 that he would resign as mayor, therefore creating a vacancy in the position.

No party holds an absolute majority in the city council. The Democratic Alliance and other smaller parties in the city council, with the support of the Economic Freedom Fighters, formed a coalition to govern the municipality after the 2016 municipal elections.

The Economic Freedom Fighters and opposition African National Congress abstained from the vote, therefore allowing Mokgalapa to be elected as mayor unopposed on 12 February 2019. Mokgalapa was voted out as mayor on 5 December 2019, but his removal was later suspended. He resigned on 26 February 2020.

== Background ==
On 18 January 2019, incumbent Mayor of Tshwane and Democratic Alliance Gauteng Premier candidate, Solly Msimanga, announced that he would resign as mayor in February 2019 in order to focus on his premiership campaign to unseat incumbent Premier of Gauteng, David Makhura. Msimanga was elected mayor after the 2016 municipal elections. He became the first mayor from the Democratic Alliance, ending the many years of African National Congress rule in the municipality.

Msimanga had survived many motions of no confidence during his tenure as mayor. The motions were tabled by the African National Congress and the Economic Freedom Fighters.

On 31 January 2019, Solly Msimanga announced that he would effectively resign on 11 February.

== Candidates ==
=== Democratic Alliance ===
The following people had been shortlisted by the Democratic Alliance as possible candidates.

- Katlego Mathebe, Speaker of the Tshwane City Council
- Mare-Lise Fourie, Member of the Mayoral Committee for Finance
- Stevens Mokgalapa, Member of Parliament
- Randall Williams, Member of the Mayoral Committee for Economic Development and Spatial Planning

On 3 February 2019, the party announced that it had selected Stevens Mokgalapa to be the party's mayoral candidate.

== Result ==
As the Economic Freedom Fighters and opposition African National Congress did not field any candidates of their own and chose to abstain from the mayoral vote. The lack of any other candidates worked in Mokgalapa's favour and he was subsequently elected unopposed.
