= 2019 Liechtenstein hospital referendum =

24 November 2019
- Referendum on the financing of a new public hospital in Vaduz

Results
Choice	Votes	%
Yes	8,090	56.22%
No	6,301	43.78%
Valid votes	14,391	99.42%
Invalid or blank votes	84	0.58%
Total votes	14,475	100.00%
Registered voters/turnout	20,243	71.51%
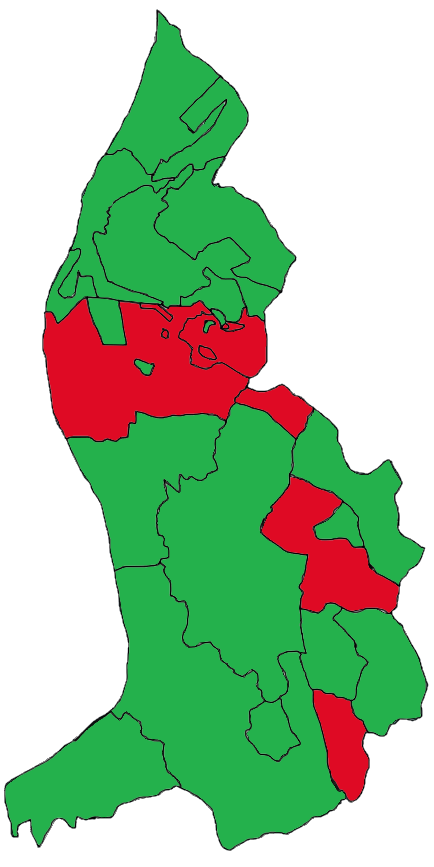
- Results by municipality

A referendum on the financing of a new public hospital in Vaduz was held in Liechtenstein on 24 November 2019. The proposal was approved by 56% of voters.

== Background ==
In 2011 a referendum was held after the Landtag voted to build a new hospital in Vaduz at a cost of 83 million Swiss francs, which would have been financed by a loan. Voters rejected the proposal by 58% to 42%.

Following the referendum, a commission was set up to implement a new, more modest project, as the cost of the hospital was deemed to be the primary reason for the rejection. The new proposal would cost 65.5 million Swiss francs, also financed by a loan. The Landtag voted in favour of the proposal on 5 September 2019 by a margin of 17-8, with MPs subsequently voting to make the loan conditional on a favourable result in a new referendum.

The vote took the form of an optional referendum of parliamentary origin on a budgetary issue; under Article 66 of the Constitution, the budget allocated by the Landtag is the subject of a request for a unanimous vote by the deputies.

== Results ==
Choice	Votes	%
For	8,090	56.22
Against	6,301	43.78
Total	14,391	100.00
Valid votes	14,391	99.42
Invalid votes	66	0.46
Blank votes	18	0.12
Total votes	14,475	100.00
Registered voters/turnout	20,243	71.51
Source: Government of Liechtenstein
