= 2019 Pitcairnese general election =

Elections in the Pitcairn Islands

General elections were held in the Pitcairn Islands on 6 November 2019. Charlene Warren-Peu was elected as mayor, becoming the first woman to hold the position. The contest for Deputy Mayor was won by Kevin Young, whilst Lea Brown, Michele Christian, Shawn Christian, Ariel Harding and Leslie Jaques were elected to the Island Council.

Warren-Peu took office on 1 January 2020.
