= 2019 South African presidential election =

Presidential election

- 22 May 2019
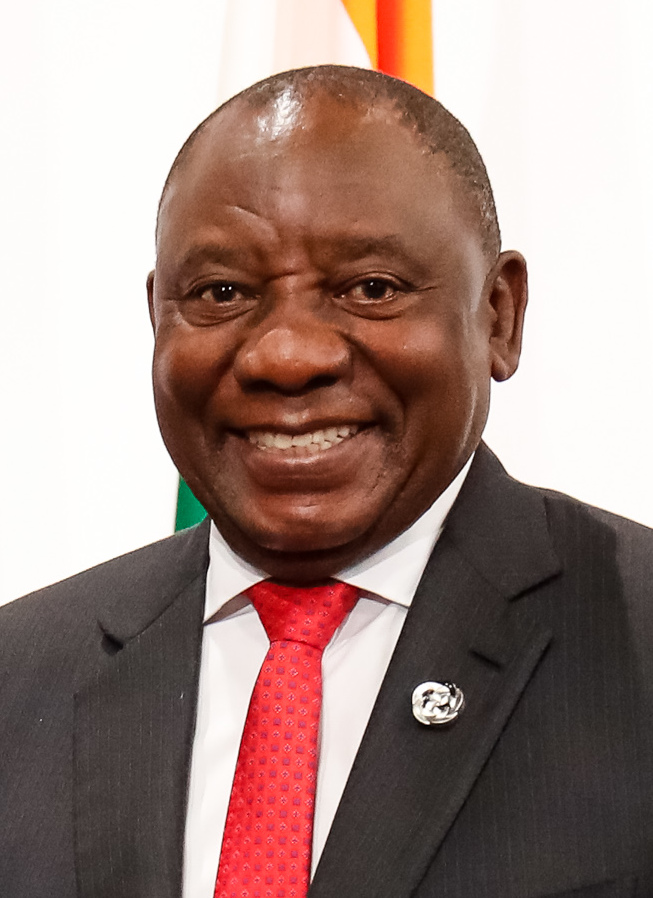
Nominee	Cyril Ramaphosa
Party	ANC
Electoral vote	Unopposed
President before election
Cyril Ramaphosa
ANC
Elected President
Cyril Ramaphosa
ANC

An indirect presidential election was held in South Africa on 22 May 2019 following the general election on 8 May 2019. Cyril Ramaphosa of African National Congress, which held a majority in parliament, was the only candidate nominated and was elected unopposed.
