= Amazonas prison massacres =

2019 Incident in Brazil

- Location: Amazonas, Brazil
- Date: 26 - 27 May 2019
- Attack type: Riot
- Weapon: Unknown
- Deaths: 55
- Injuries: Unknown

The Amazonas prison massacres occurred on 26–27 May 2019 after a series of riots at five different prisons in Amazonas, Brazil. 55 prisoners have thus far been killed. All the deaths involved inmates and all died from strangulation or stabbings. Authorities claim they have regained control of the prisons.
