= 2019 Swiss referendums =

Several federal referendums were held in Switzerland in 2019, with votes taking place on 10 February and 19 May. Federal parliamentary elections were held on 20 October, which led the Swiss Federal Council to postpone the November round of voting until 2020.

== February referendum ==
In February voters decided on a popular initiative named "Stop the Sprawl – for sustainable development in construction", which would have prevented building zones being expanded, with possible exception made for agriculture or public use on the basis that an equivalent amount of land currently registered as building zone be declassified and rewilded.

The proposal was put forward by the Young Greens in 2015. It was also supported by the Small Farmers Association and the Young Socialists, as well as several environmental organisations, and gathered 113,000 signatures. However, it was opposed by the Federal Council, with Environment Minister Doris Leuthard claiming the idea was "too radical, unfair and counterproductive". An opinion poll published in December 2018 showed 63% of voters to be in favour and 29% opposed.

=== Results ===
Question	For		Against		Invalid/ blank	Total votes	Registered voters	Turnout	Cantons for		Cantons against		Result
Question	Votes	%	Votes	%	Invalid/ blank	Total votes	Registered voters	Turnout	Full	Half	Full	Half	Result
Stop the Sprawl	737,241	36.3	1,291,513	63.7	30,184	2,058,938	5,429,641	37.9	0	0	20	6	Rejected
Source: Federal Chancellery of Switzerland

== May referendums ==
Two optional referendums were held on 19 May: one on a law reforming the financing of the Swiss pension system's "first pillar", and another on transposing the European gun control directive (an update to the Schengen acquis) into Swiss law. Both proposals were approved.

=== Results ===
Question	For		Against		Invalid/ blank	Total votes	Registered voters	Turnout	Result
Question	Votes	%	Votes	%	Invalid/ blank	Total votes	Registered voters	Turnout	Result
Reforming pension financing	1,541,147	66.4	780,457	33.6	57,814	2,379,418	5,439,853	43.74	Approved
Gun control directive	1,501,880	63.7	854,274	36.3	30,797	2,386,951	5,439,853	43.88	Approved
Source: Federal Chancellery of Switzerland
