= 2019 Uruguayan constitutional referendum =

- 27 October 2019
- Do you vote YES on the Constitutional Reform project that encourages the law to regulate night searches by judicial order; that those who were sentenced for certain crimes must serve the sentences in their entirety; establishes the penalty of permanent reclusion before the commission of certain serious crimes that may be reviewed by the Supreme Court after 30 years of imprisonment and creates the National Guard with powers and duties of public security?

Results
Choice	Votes	%
Yes	1,139,433	46.83%
No	1,293,931	53.17%
Valid votes	2,433,364	100.00%
Invalid or blank votes	0	0.00%
Total votes	2,433,364	100.00%
Registered voters/turnout	2,699,463	90.14%

The 2019 Uruguayan constitutional referendum, officially referred to as the referendum for constitutional reform on security matters (Spanish: plebiscito de reforma constitucional en materia de seguridad), took place alongside general election of that year, on 27 October 2019, to ask the electorate whether a constitutional reform in public security should be approved. The proposed amendments to the Constitution would create a national guard, forbid early release for some serious crimes, introduce life sentences for crimes of rape, sexual abuse or homicide of minors as well as aggravated homicide of adults, and allow the police to conduct night raids. The referendum resulted in 46.8% of the votes cast in favor of amending the Constitution; however, not reaching the necessary 50%, the amendment was not approved, being rejected by 53.7% of the votes.

== Campaign ==
Following a call by Senator Jorge Larrañaga, a movement to collect signatures was organized under the slogan "Vivir sin Miedo"(Spanish for "Living without fear"), with the aim of making changes to the public security legislation. Finally, enough people signed the proposal and the Electoral Court validated it. The most notable aspects of the proposed reform are summarized below:

- Creation of a National Guard (military) with members of the Armed Forces,
- Compliance with sentences (prohibition of early release for certain serious crimes),
- Reviewable life sentence
- Night raids (currently, the Uruguayan Constitution only allows daytime raids even with a court order).

The proposal was very controversial. The validation of the referendum was a few months before the presidential primaries were held — in which its promoter, Jorge Larrañaga, barely received 78,450 votes and was third in the National Party. Because of this, many candidates strongly objected to the initiative. Furthermore, the Institute of Human Rights came to question the validity of the initiative itself.

== Responses ==
None of the 11 candidates for President supported the proposed constitutional reform. The ruling party, the leftist Broad Front, as well as Popular Unity and the Workers' Party rejected the reform. In the rest of the political spectrum, the candidates Luis Lacalle Pou, Guido Manini Ríos and Ernesto Talvi spoke out against the proposal, but they let their supporters free to act.

Simultaneously, a group was formed to carry out a counter-campaign, called: "Articulación Nacional No a la Reforma" (Spanish for: "National Articulation No to the Reform"). With the slogan "No a la reforma, el miedo no es la forma" (Spanish for: "No to reform, fear is not the way)", they urged a deeper analysis of reality, and the true roots of insecurity, appealing to education, rehabilitation and prevention instead of violence, fear or repression. On October 22, 2019, an act against the constitutional reform was held on 18 de Julio Avenue. In the last week of the campaign, Former President Julio María Sanguinetti announced that he would vote in favor of the reform and stated that "it is a personal decision and does not represent the thinking of the Colorado Party." The then President, Tabaré Vázquez said that he was against the proposal, stating "I trust the intelligence of the Uruguayan people." After these statements, the possibility that Vázquez had violated the Constitution when pronouncing on this issue was discussed.

== Results ==
Voters participating in the general elections had the opportunity to take a ballot in favour of the proposed amendment, and attach it to their ballots in their envelopes, or not to do so. Only the presence (or not) of the "yes" ballot was recorded as a vote being cast, with no invalid votes possible.

Although legally binding, in order to be considered valid, the proposal must receive an absolute majority of votes in its favour, and be supported by at least 35% of registered voters (turnout). The measure failed, receiving the necessary quorum but not a majority of votes in favour. The total number of registered voters used to calculate the referendum turnout rate differed slightly from that of registered voters for the elections held on the same day, as some foreign nationals with a significant period of residency were able to vote in elections, but not in referendums.

Choice	Votes	%
For	1,139,433	46.83
✗ Against	1,293,931	53.17
Total	2,433,364	100
Registered voters/turnout	2,699,463	90.14
Source: Corte Electoral

=== By constituency ===
Constituency	Yes	No	
Constituency	%	%	
Constituency	Artigas	60.9	39.1
Canelones	43.7	56.3	
Cerro Largo	54.2	45.8	
Colonia	48.8	51.2	
Durazno	57.7	42.3	
Flores	57.3	42.7	
Florida	52.3	47.7	
Lavalleja	60.7	39.3	
Maldonado	55.2	44.8	
Montevideo	38.8	61.2	
Paysandú	50.7	49.3	
Rio Negro	52.0	48.0	
Rivera	62.0	38.0	
Rocha	50.7	49.3	
Salto	53.7	46.3	
San Jose	49.7	50.3	
Soriano	49.6	50.4	
Tacuarembó	56.4	43.6	
Treinta y Tres	57.4	42.6	
Total	46.8	53.2	
Source: El País
