= 2019 Latvian presidential election =

← 2015	May 29, 2019	2023 →
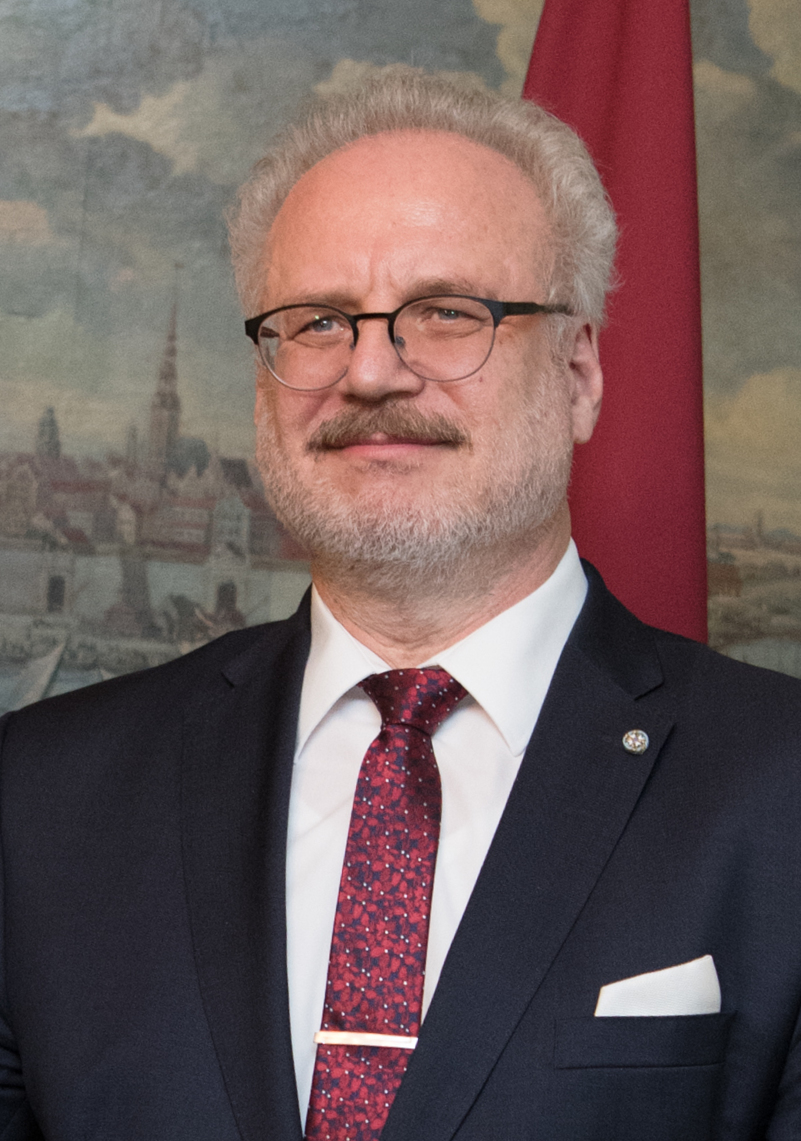

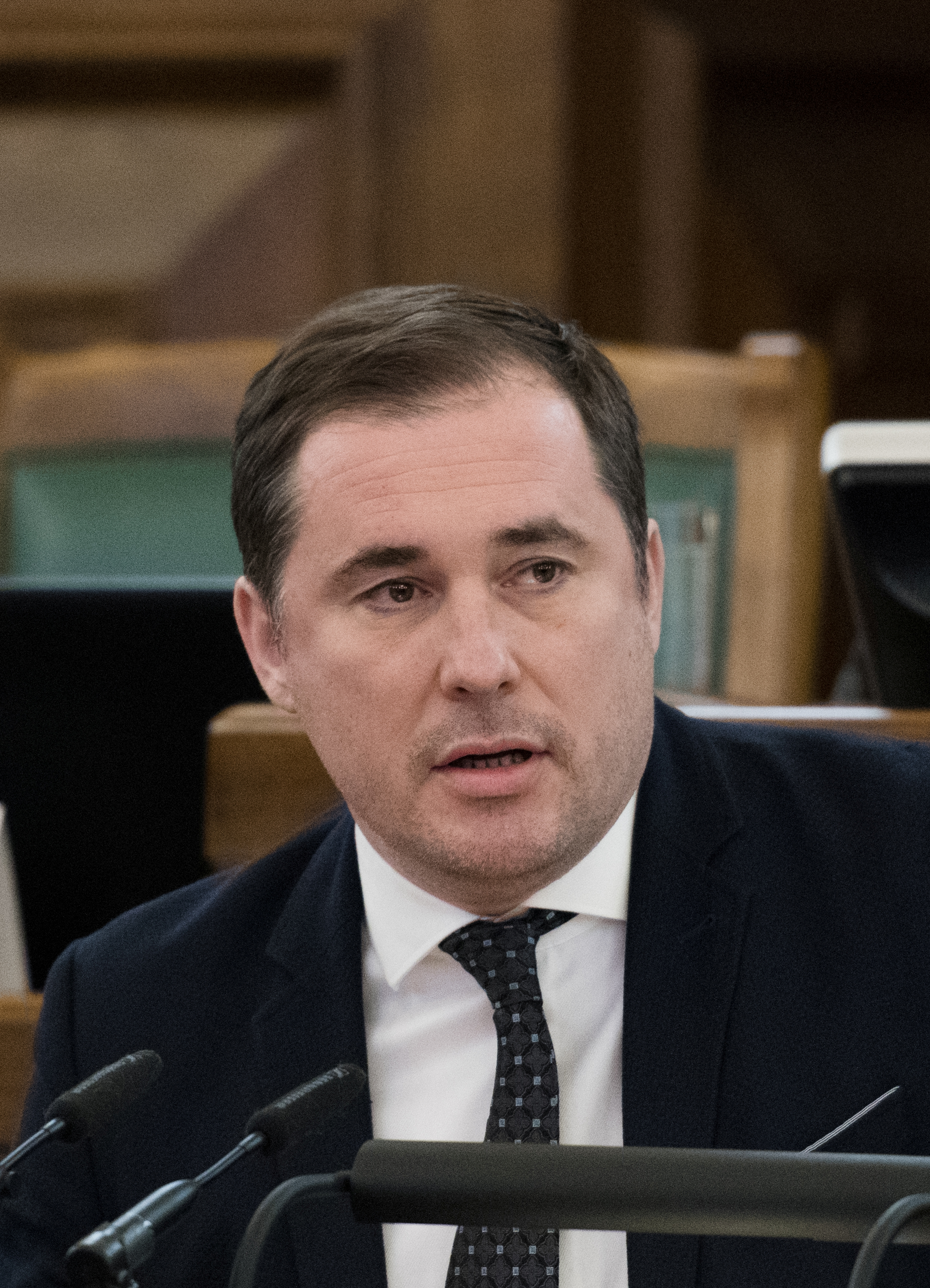
Candidate	Egils Levits	Didzis Šmits
Electoral vote	61	24
President of Latvia before election
Raimonds Vējonis
Elected President of Latvia
Egils Levits

Indirect presidential elections were held in Latvia on 29 May 2019.

== Voting system ==
Before the first round of the presidential election, the political parties represented in the Saeima nominate their candidate.

The president is elected in the first round if they receive the absolute majority of the deputies, i.e. 51 votes out of 100.

In case of failure, another round is organized with the same candidates or different ones, and under the same conditions. If no one is elected, other rounds are held until a candidate receives 51 votes and becomes President of Latvia. The president of the Saeima chairs the electoral college.

== Elections ==
Candidates for the position of President of Latvia – Egils Levits, Juris Jansons and Didzis Šmits (from left to right)

Latvia's parliament elected former European Court of Justice judge Egils Levits as the Baltic country's next president on Wednesday, a largely ceremonial role that also brings with it limited political powers.

The results of the vote were as follows:

Results
Candidates	Parties	Votes	%
Egils Levits	Independent	61	65,59
Didzis Šmits	KPV LV	24	25,81
Juris Jansons	Independent	8	8,60
Valides votes		93	97,89
Blank and invalid votes		2	2,11
Total		95	100
Abstention		5	5,00
Registered voters / turnout		100	95,00

Having received 61 votes, Levits began serving a four-year term starting on July 8, when incumbent president Raimonds Vējonis' term came to an end.
