= 2019 San Marino referendum =

Two referendums were held in San Marino on 2 June 2019. The first was a popular initiative on amending the electoral system to require a second round between the top two parties to be held thirty days after general elections if neither party is able to form a coalition government. The other was on a constitutional amendment proposed by the Captains Regent that would add sexual orientation to the list of discriminations prohibited by law. This followed a vote by the Grand and General Council on the amendment failing to meet the two-thirds quorum.

Both proposals were approved by voters.

== Background ==
Referendums in San Marino had previously required a quorum of 25% of eligible voters voting in favour to pass, but this system was abolished after a 2016 referendum. Citizens living abroad are not able to vote.

Referendums can be proposed by either the government or through a citizen-held popular initiative.

== Proposals ==
The first referendum was a popular initiative to amend the electoral system to require a second round of voting between the top two parties be held thirty days after general elections if neither party is able to form a coalition government.

The second referendum was a constitutional amendment proposed by the Captains Regent that would prohibit discrimination based on sexual orientation. The amendment was previously voted on by the Grand and General Council but failed to reach the two-thirds majority required for the legislature to pass an amendment.

== Results ==
Both proposals were approved by voters.

Question	For		Against		Invalid/ blank	Total votes	Registered voters	Turnout	Result
Question	Votes	%	Votes	%	Invalid/ blank	Total votes	Registered voters	Turnout	Result
Popular initiative on electoral system reform	8,554	60.58	5,566	39.42	344	14,464	34,458	41.98	Approved
Prohibiting discrimination based on sexual orientation	9,996	71.46	3,992	28.54	452	14,440	34,458	41.91	Approved
Source: Libertas

== See also ==
- LGBTQ rights in San Marino
