= 2019 Cuban constitutional referendum =

- 24 February 2019
- Do you ratify the new Constitution of the Republic?

Results
Choice	Votes	%
Yes	6,816,169	90.61%
No	706,400	9.39%
Valid votes	7,522,569	95.85%
Invalid or blank votes	324,774	4.14%
Total votes	7,848,343	100.00%
Registered voters/turnout	8,705,723	90.15%
- Results by province

A constitutional referendum was held in Cuba on 24 February 2019. Voters were asked whether they approved of a new constitution passed by the National Assembly of People's Power in July 2018. The reforms were approved, with 91% of valid votes cast in favour. The new constitution came into force on 10 April 2019 after it was proclaimed in the Cuban National Assembly and published in the Official Gazette of the Republic.

== Background ==
While the structure of Cuban society and its political system had not fundamentally changed, the 2010s saw the Cuban thaw and more openness with the constitutional referendum, which was described as a relatively open process. Some observers noted that even though the political system remained largely the same, civil liberties had recently increased, even if not enough. The referendum recognized both private property and foreign direct investment, among other things, such as removing obstacles to same-sex marriage and banning discrimination based on gender, race, ethnic origin, sexual orientation, gender identity, or disability, the introduction of habeas corpus and restoration of a presumption of innocence in the justice system which was last provided for in the 1940 Constitution of Cuba, and other political reforms, such as presidential term and age limits, as checks on government power. One of the prospective drafts of the constitution omitted the aim of building a communist society and instead works towards the construction of socialism. However, following a series of community meetings across Cuba which debated the draft, it was readded in the final draft before going to a vote.

== Constitutional changes ==
Proposals in the new constitution include:

- The recognition of private property.
- The recognition of foreign direct investment.
- The restoration of the position of Prime Minister of Cuba.
- The transfer of head of Council of State to the President of the National Assembly.
- The position of mayor being added to that of president of a municipal assembly.
- The creation of a required ratification of presidential-appointed Provincial Governors and Deputy Governors by local municipal governments.
- The creation of new Provincial Councils made up of members chosen by municipalities to replace the current system of provincial assemblies modeled after the National Assembly of People's Power.
- The introduction of a mandatory maximum age limit of 60 years for any President of Cuba entering their first term.
- The creation of a two consecutive five-year term limit for the presidency.
- Extending the terms of municipal council delegates to five years.
- Banning discrimination based on gender, race, ethnic origin, sexual orientation, gender identity or disability.
- The restoration of a presumption of innocence in the justice system, last provided for in the 1940 Constitution of Cuba.
- Introducing the right to legal counsel immediately upon arrest.
- Introducing the ability to sue the government for damages or negligence.
- Introducing the right to appear before a judge and report unlawful imprisonment through habeas corpus.

The new Constitution came into force after being proclaimed by the National Assembly on 10 April 2019. Laws which were passed to enforce the Constitution's reforms to the country's judicial system must be enacted within 18 months. An electoral law detailing the restructuring of government must also be passed within six months. A Cuban President must then be elected by the National Assembly in the following three months and then appoint Provincial Governors and a Prime Minister.

=== Same-sex marriage ===
The new constitution also removes the requirement that marriage be "between one man and one woman". An earlier draft of the new constitution would have changed the language to "a union between two people" ... "with absolutely equal responsibilities". This language was removed due to backlash from the more conservative sectors of Cuban society, with the new constitution not specifically recognizing same-sex marriage, but still removing the constitutional obstacles to its recognition by specifically avoiding a definition of marriage. Mariela Castro, a Cuban LGBT rights activist, daughter of Raúl Castro and director of the Cuban National Center for Sex Education, has stated that this change is "not a setback" and that the issue would be addressed in the upcoming family code amendment. It was expected that same-sex marriage would be part of a new Cuban Family Code, which was due to be put to a new referendum within the next two years. The 2022 Cuban Family Code referendum resulted in a 2/3 vote in favor of a law legalizing same-sex marriages on the island.

== Reactions ==
The Patriotic Union of Cuba (UNPACU) denounced the violent break in of several headquarters of the organization on the island by the Cuban police.

More than 200 Cuban military (assault troops) and police forces, with the presence of the high command of the Ministry of the Interior, stormed 8 UNPACU headquarters in the early hours of this morning [Monday night to Tuesday] with extreme violence. Without search warrants and simultaneously, using grinders, they broke the gates of the houses, which had been under siege for nights, and entered, beating all the people who inside.

— Communiqué of the Patriotic Union of Cuba

Among those arrested were the elderly, pregnant women and minors, according to José Daniel Ferrer, a conscientious objector and coordinator of UNPACU who was also arrested and beaten; he also denounced that both his five-month pregnant partner and his 78-year-old grandmother were attacked, that several belongings were stolen from their home and that the political police seized a list containing the names of 600 observers that UNPACU was to deploy to monitor the referendum day in order to denounce irregularities.

The General Secretariat of the Organization of American States (OAS) considered the referendum "illegitimate" and assured that it only serves to "mask the dictatorship" before the international community. The Cuban executive accused the Secretary General of the OAS, Luis Almagro, of formulating "slander and lies".

The Cuban Observatory for Human Rights (OCDH) denounced: "It has become evident that this Constitution (as the previous one), imposed by the Communist Party, does not represent or respect the plurality of Cuban society. Nor does the National Assembly of People's Power itself, the organ of unanimity, represent such plurality."

== Results ==
Votes cast for "No" by province

Choice	Votes	%
For	6,816,169	90.61
Against	706,400	9.39
Total	7,522,569	100.00
Valid votes	7,522,569	95.85
Invalid votes	127,100	1.62
Blank votes	198,674	2.53
Total votes	7,848,343	100.00
Registered voters/turnout	8,705,723	90.15
Source: Prensa Latina

=== By province and equivalents ===
Province	For		Against	
Province	Votes	%	Votes	%
Pinar del Río	380,326	94.11	23,784	5.89
Artemisa	314,356	91.00	31,099	9.00
La Habana	1,235,178	89.34	147,380	10.66
Mayabeque	228,856	88.70	29,151	11.30
Matanzas	456,967	92.72	35,888	7.28
Cienfuegos	248,007	92.21	20,964	7.79
Villa Clara	497,482	92.25	41,794	7.75
Sancti Spíritus	310,212	93.76	20,651	6.24
Ciego de Ávila	283,004	93.68	19,108	6.32
Camagüey	473,335	91.68	42,955	8.32
Las Tunas	316,983	88.97	39,313	11.03
Granma	507,351	91.92	44,585	8.08
Holguín	567,837	84.75	102,161	15.25
Santiago de Cuba	635,901	91.92	55,878	8.08
Guantánamo	278,851	85.58	46,970	14.42
Isla de la Juventud	51,171	92.21	4,321	7.79
Overseas voters	30,352	98.71	398	1.29
Total valid votes	6,816,169	90.61	706,400	9.39
Source: Consejo Electoral Nacional
