= 2019 in the United States =

- Decades: 1990s; 2000s; 2010s; 2020s; 2030s
- See also: History of the United States (2016–present); Timeline of United States history (2010–present); List of years in the United States

Events from the year 2019 in the United States.

== Incumbents ==
=== Federal government ===
- President: Donald Trump (R-New York, then R-Florida)
- Vice President: Mike Pence (R-Indiana)
- Chief Justice: John Roberts (Maryland)
- Speaker of the House of Representatives:

Paul Ryan (R-Wisconsin) (until January 3)
Nancy Pelosi (D-California) (starting January 3)

- Senate Majority Leader: Mitch McConnell (R-Kentucky)
- Congress: 115th (until January 3), 116th (starting January 3)

==== State governments ====
Governors and lieutenant governors

=== Governors ===
- Governor of Alabama: Kay Ivey (Republican)
- Governor of Alaska: Mike Dunleavy (Republican)
- Governor of Arizona: Doug Ducey (Republican)
- Governor of Arkansas: Asa Hutchinson (Republican)
- Governor of California: Jerry Brown (Democratic) (until January 7), Gavin Newsom (Democratic) (since January 7)
- Governor of Colorado: John Hickenlooper (Democratic) (until January 8), Jared Polis (Democratic) (since January 8)
- Governor of Connecticut: Dannel Malloy (Democratic) (until January 9), Ned Lamont (Democratic) (since January 9)
- Governor of Delaware: John Carney (Democratic)
- Governor of Florida: Rick Scott (Republican) (until January 8), Ron DeSantis (Republican) (since January 8)
- Governor of Georgia: Nathan Deal (Republican) (until January 14), Brian Kemp (Republican) (since January 14)
- Governor of Hawaii: David Ige (Democratic)
- Governor of Idaho: Butch Otter (Republican) (until January 7), Brad Little (Republican) (since January 7)
- Governor of Illinois: Bruce Rauner (Republican) (until January 14), J. B. Pritzker (Democratic) (since January 14)
- Governor of Indiana: Eric Holcomb (Republican)
- Governor of Iowa: Kim Reynolds (Republican)
- Governor of Kansas: Jeff Colyer (Republican) (until January 14), Laura Kelly (Democratic) (since January 14)
- Governor of Kentucky: Matt Bevin (Republican) (until December 10), Andy Beshear (Democratic) (since December 10)
- Governor of Louisiana: John Bel Edwards (Democratic)
- Governor of Maine: Paul LePage (Republican) (until January 2), Janet Mills (Democratic) (since January 2)
- Governor of Maryland: Larry Hogan (Republican)
- Governor of Massachusetts: Charlie Baker (Republican)
- Governor of Michigan: Rick Snyder (Republican) (until January 1), Gretchen Whitmer (Democratic) (since January 1)
- Governor of Mississippi: Phil Bryant (Republican)
- Governor of Missouri: Mike Parson (Republican)
- Governor of Minnesota: Mark Dayton (Democratic) (until January 7), Tim Walz (Democratic) (since January 7)
- Governor of Montana: Steve Bullock (Democratic)
- Governor of Nebraska: Pete Ricketts (Republican)
- Governor of Nevada: Brian Sandoval (Republican) (until January 7), Steve Sisolak (Democratic) (since January 7)
- Governor of New Hampshire: Chris Sununu (Republican)
- Governor of New Jersey: Phil Murphy (Democratic)
- Governor of New Mexico: Susana Martinez (Republican) (until January 1), Michelle Lujan Grisham (Democratic) (since January 1)
- Governor of New York: Andrew Cuomo (Democratic)
- Governor of North Carolina: Roy Cooper (Democratic)
- Governor of North Dakota: Doug Burgum (Republican)
- Governor of Ohio: John Kasich (Republican) (until January 14), Mike DeWine (Republican) (since January 14)
- Governor of Oklahoma: Mary Fallin (Republican) (until January 14), Kevin Stitt (Republican) (since January 14)
- Governor of Oregon: Kate Brown (Democratic)
- Governor of Pennsylvania: Tom Wolf (Democratic)
- Governor of Rhode Island: Gina Raimondo (Democratic)
- Governor of South Carolina: Henry McMaster (Republican)
- Governor of South Dakota: Dennis Daugaard (Republican) (until January 5), Kristi Noem (Republican) (since January 5)
- Governor of Tennessee: Bill Haslam (Republican) (until January 19), Bill Lee (Republican) (since January 19)
- Governor of Texas: Greg Abbott (Republican)
- Governor of Utah: Gary Herbert (Republican)
- Governor of Vermont: Phil Scott (Republican)
- Governor of Virginia: Ralph Northam (Democratic)
- Governor of Washington: Jay Inslee (Democratic)
- Governor of West Virginia: Jim Justice (Republican)
- Governor of Wisconsin: Scott Walker (Republican) (until January 7), Tony Evers (Democratic) (since January 7)
- Governor of Wyoming: Matt Mead (Republican) (until January 7), Mark Gordon (Republican) (since January 7)

=== Lieutenant governors ===
- Lieutenant Governor of Alabama: vacant (until January 14), Will Ainsworth (Republican) (since January 14)
- Lieutenant Governor of Alaska: Kevin Meyer (Republican)
- Lieutenant Governor of Arkansas: Tim Griffin (Republican)
- Lieutenant Governor of California: Gavin Newsom (Democratic) (until January 7), Eleni Kounalakis (Democratic) (since January 7)
- Lieutenant Governor of Colorado: Donna Lynne (Democratic) (until January 8), Dianne Primavera (Democratic) (since January 8)
- Lieutenant Governor of Connecticut: Nancy Wyman (Democratic) (until January 9), Susan Bysiewicz (Democratic) (since January 9)
- Lieutenant Governor of Delaware: Bethany Hall-Long (Democratic)
- Lieutenant Governor of Florida: Carlos Lopez-Cantera (Republican) (until January 8), Jeanette Nunez (Republican) (since January 8)
- Lieutenant Governor of Georgia: Casey Cagle (Republican) (until January 14), Geoff Duncan (Republican) (since January 14)
- Lieutenant Governor of Hawaii: Josh Green (Democratic)
- Lieutenant Governor of Idaho: Brad Little (Republican) (until January 7), Janice McGeachin (Republican) (since January 7)
- Lieutenant Governor of Illinois: Evelyn Sanguinetti (Republican) (until January 14), Juliana Stratton (Democratic) (since January 14)
- Lieutenant Governor of Indiana: Suzanne Crouch (Republican)
- Lieutenant Governor of Iowa: vacant (until January 14), Adam Gregg (Republican) (since January 14)
- Lieutenant Governor of Kansas: Tracey Mann (Republican) (until January 14), Lynn Rogers (Democratic) (since January 14)
- Lieutenant Governor of Kentucky: Jenean Hampton (Republican) (until December 10), Jacqueline Coleman (Democratic) (since December 10)
- Lieutenant Governor of Louisiana: Billy Nungesser (Republican)
- Lieutenant Governor of Maryland: Boyd Rutherford (Republican)
- Lieutenant Governor of Massachusetts: Karyn Polito (Republican)
- Lieutenant Governor of Michigan: Brian Calley (Republican) (until January 1), Garlin Gilchrist (Democratic) (since January 1)
- Lieutenant Governor of Minnesota: Michelle Fischbach (Republican) (until January 7), Peggy Flanagan (Democratic) (since January 7)
- Lieutenant Governor of Mississippi: Tate Reeves (Republican)
- Lieutenant Governor of Missouri: Mike Kehoe (Republican)
- Lieutenant Governor of Montana: Mike Cooney (Democratic)
- Lieutenant Governor of Nebraska: Mike Foley (Republican)
- Lieutenant Governor of Nevada: Mark Hutchison (Republican) (until January 7), Kate Marshall (Democratic) (since January 7)
- Lieutenant Governor of New Jersey: Sheila Oliver (Democratic)
- Lieutenant Governor of New Mexico: John Sanchez (Republican) (until January 1), Howie Morales (Democratic) (since January 1)
- Lieutenant Governor of New York: Kathy Hochul (Democratic)
- Lieutenant Governor of North Carolina: Dan Forest (Republican)
- Lieutenant Governor of North Dakota: Brent Sanford (Republican)
- Lieutenant Governor of Ohio: Mary Taylor (Republican) (until January 14), Jon A. Husted (Republican) (since January 14)
- Lieutenant Governor of Oklahoma: Todd Lamb (Republican) (until January 14), Matt Pinnell (Republican) (since January 14)
- Lieutenant Governor of Pennsylvania: Mike Stack (Democratic) (until January 15), John Fetterman (since January 15)
- Lieutenant Governor of Rhode Island: Daniel McKee (Democratic)
- Lieutenant Governor of South Carolina: Kevin L. Bryant (Republican) (until January 9), Pamela Evette (Republican) (since January 9)
- Lieutenant Governor of South Dakota: Matt Michels (Republican) (until January 5), Larry Rhoden (Republican) (since January 5)
- Lieutenant Governor of Tennessee: Randy McNally (Republican)
- Lieutenant Governor of Texas: Dan Patrick (Republican)
- Lieutenant Governor of Utah: Spencer Cox (Republican)
- Lieutenant Governor of Vermont: David Zuckerman (Progressive)
- Lieutenant Governor of Virginia: Justin Fairfax (Democratic)
- Lieutenant Governor of Washington: Cyrus Habib (Democratic)
- Lieutenant Governor of Wisconsin: Rebecca Kleefisch (Republican) (until January 7), Mandela Barnes (Democratic) (since January 7)

== Events ==
=== January ===
- January 1
  - Public Domain Day: All works published in 1923 except sound recordings enter the public domain in the United States, the first works to do so since the passage of the 1998 Sonny Bono Copyright Term Extension Act.
  - Washington state bans all persons under 21 years of age from purchasing a semi-automatic assault rifle.
- January 2 – Adventist Health System rebranded its facilities to the trade name AdventHealth.
- January 3 – The Democrats take control of the House of Representatives, with a promise to end the government shutdown, but without funding for President Donald Trump's proposed border wall. The Republicans increase their control of the United States Senate.
- January 4 – Government data reveals that the U.S. economy added 312,000 jobs in December, far ahead of predictions of 177,000, and that manufacturing ended 2018 with the most jobs added in one year since 1997.
- January 6 – Six people, including an Arab American family from Michigan, are killed after an SUV and a pickup truck collide on Interstate 75 in Lexington, Kentucky, U.S., causing both vehicles to catch fire.
- January 8 – In a televised address to the nation, President Donald Trump makes the case for his proposed border wall.
- January 11 – Representative Tulsi Gabbard announces her candidacy for U.S. president.
- January 12
  - The ongoing government shutdown becomes the longest in U.S. history at 22 days, leaving 800,000 employees unpaid.
  - Former Secretary of Housing and Urban Development Julián Castro announces his candidacy for U.S. president.
- January 14 – J. B. Pritzker is sworn in as the 43rd governor of Illinois, replacing Bruce Rauner.
- January 15 – Senator Kirsten Gillibrand announces her candidacy for U.S. president.
- January 19 – President Trump offers a "compromise" of three years' additional protection for 700,000 Dreamers who entered the US illegally with their parents and the 300,000 people holding visas under Temporary Protection Status (TPS) in exchange for funding for his security wall, but the offer is rejected by Democrats.
- January 21 – The Supreme Court rules that the Trump administration is allowed to limit military service for transgender people.
- January 23 – South Bend, Indiana mayor Pete Buttigieg announces his candidacy for U.S. president.
- January 25
  - Political consultant Roger Stone is charged with seven counts in the 2017–2019 Special Counsel's investigation, including obstruction of justice and witness tampering.
  - Flights are halted into New York's LaGuardia Airport due to shortages of air traffic control staff, as a result of the ongoing government shutdown.
  - President Trump agrees to temporarily end the government shutdown as he backs a deal to fund federal agencies for three weeks.
- January 28 – The Justice Department charges Chinese tech firm Huawei with multiple counts of fraud, raising U.S.-China tensions.
- January 29 – Author Marianne Williamson announces her candidacy for U.S. president.
- January 30
  - Large portions of the United States are hit by a polar vortex, bringing "once-in-a-generation" low temperatures and heavy snow. A state of emergency is declared in several states and a number of cold-related deaths are reported.
  - Teachers rally in Denver following a vote on January 22 to strike for higher pay.
  - Sandusky, Ohio becomes the first city in the country to make Election Day a paid holiday while eliminating Columbus Day.

=== February ===
- February 1
  - President Donald Trump confirms that the U.S. will leave the Intermediate-range Nuclear Forces treaty.
  - Senator Cory Booker announces his candidacy for U.S. president.
- February 3 – Super Bowl LIII is hosted at Mercedes-Benz Stadium in Atlanta, Georgia. Tom Brady, the quarterback of the New England Patriots football team, wins his sixth championship, the most NFL world championships ever won by a single player, with the Patriots' six titles tying the Steelers for most Super Bowl wins.
- February 5 – State of the Union Address.
- February 9 – Senator Elizabeth Warren announces her candidacy for U.S. president.
- February 10 – Senator Amy Klobuchar announces her candidacy for U.S. president.
- February 12 – Mexican drug boss Joaquín "El Chapo" Guzmán is found guilty on all 10 counts at his drug-trafficking trial at a federal court in New York.
- February 15
  - Gary Montez Martin murders five people and injures six others in a mass shooting at Henry Pratt Company in Aurora, Illinois.
  - President Trump declares a national emergency to free up funds for his proposed border wall.
- February 16 – Bishop Theodore Edgar McCarrick is defrocked, following historical sexual abuse allegations. He becomes the most senior Catholic figure to be dismissed from the priesthood in modern times.
- February 19 – Senator Bernie Sanders announces his candidacy for the 2020 presidential election.
- February 20 – U.S. Coast Guard lieutenant Christopher Paul Hasson, who planned a domestic terrorist attack targeting politicians and journalists, is arrested.
- February 21
  - Jussie Smollett hate crime hoax: Actor Jussie Smollett is arrested after being charged with disorderly conduct for staging a racist attack on himself in Chicago. Smollett maintains his innocence.
  - Senator Kamala Harris declares her candidacy for U.S. president.
- February 22
  - Singer R. Kelly is charged with 10 counts of aggravated criminal sexual abuse for incidents dating back as far as 1998.
  - National Coalition for Men v. Selective Service System: The United States District Court for the Southern District of Texas rules that male-only conscription breaches the Fourteenth Amendment's equal protection clause.
- February 23 – Atlas Air Flight 3591 crashed into Trinity Bay, near Anahuac, Texas, approximately 40 miles southeast of George Bush Intercontinental Airport, killing everyone onboard.
- February 24 – The 91st Academy Awards, the first since 1989 to have no official host, are held at Dolby Theatre in Hollywood, with Peter Farrelly's Green Book winning Best Picture. Bryan Singer's Bohemian Rhapsody wins four awards, among them Rami Malek for Best Actor, and both Yorgos Lanthimos' The Favourite and Alfonso Cuarón's Roma both lead with ten nominations. Cuarón wins his second Best Director award, Olivia Colman wins Best Actress for The Favourite, Mahershala Ali Best Supporting Actor for Green Book and Regina King Best Supporting Actress for If Beale Street Could Talk. The telecast garners nearly 29.6 million viewers.
- February 27 – President Trump's ex-lawyer Michael Cohen tells Congress that Trump had advanced knowledge of leaked Democratic emails during the 2016 presidential campaign.
- February 27–28 – The 2019 North Korea–United States Hanoi Summit is held in Vietnam. It is the second summit with a United States president and the North Korean leader.

=== March ===
- March 1 – Washington State governor Jay Inslee announces his candidacy in the 2020 presidential election.
- March 3
  - An unmanned demonstration flight of the SpaceX Dragon achieves successful autonomous docking with the International Space Station.
  - A severe tornado outbreak hits the southern states of Alabama, Georgia, Florida, and South Carolina, leaving at least 23 people dead and leaving 10,000 homes and businesses without electricity.
- March 4 – Former Colorado governor John Hickenlooper announces his candidacy for the 2020 U.S. presidential election.
- March 8 – Captain Marvel, directed by Anna Boden and Ryan Fleck, is released by Marvel Studios as the 21st film of the Marvel Cinematic Universe (MCU). It becomes the fifth-highest-grossing film of 2019 during its run, earning $1.128 billion worldwide.
- March 12
  - The 2019 college admissions bribery scandal becomes public; around 50 people are accused of bribery and fraud to secure admission to elite colleges, including actresses Felicity Huffman and Lori Loughlin.
  - California governor Gavin Newsom places a moratorium on California's death penalty, thus ordering a reprieve for the 737 people on death row.
- March 13
  - Boeing grounds its entire global fleet of 737 Max aircraft in response to evidence gathered following the crashes of Ethiopian Airlines Flight 302 and Lion Air Flight 610.
  - Former Representative Beto O'Rourke announces his candidacy for the 2020 U.S. presidential election.
- March 15
  - President Trump issues the first veto of his presidency, striking down a Senate resolution to end his national emergency declaration to build a border wall.
  - Hundreds of students stage a walkout and rally at the Capitol building, demanding legal action on climate change. They are joined by students in over 1,600 simultaneous protests in 100 countries around the world.
  - Robert Gentile, 82, whom federal authorities believe is a person of interest in the $500 million Isabella Stewart Gardner Museum theft, is released from federal custody.
  - The New Mexico legislature votes to replace Columbus Day with Indigenous Peoples' Day.
- March 17
  - The Washington State Senate approves legislation that would legally require all presidential candidates to release the last five years of their personal tax returns in order to have their names featured on both primary and general election voting ballots.
  - The University of Tennessee announces it will guarantee free tuition and fees to admitted in-state residents with a family household income of less than $50,000.
- March 18 – Floods across the Midwest kill at least three people and inflict hundreds of millions of dollars in damage.
- March 19 – American Karen Uhlenbeck is the first woman to win the Abel Prize for outstanding contributions to mathematics.
- March 20 – The International 2019 Major League Baseball season begins with the Oakland Athletics and the Seattle Mariners playing in Japan at the Tokyo Dome.
- March 21 – Cesar Sayoc, 57, the Florida man accused of the October 2018 United States mail bombing attempts, pleads guilty in Manhattan federal court to 65 felony counts, including using weapons of mass destruction in an attempted domestic terrorist attack.
- March 22
  - Jimmy Carter becomes the longest-living U.S. president at 94 years, 172 days old.
  - Special Counsel Robert Mueller turns in the report of his nearly two-year investigation on whether the Trump campaign helped Russia interfere in the 2016 presidential election.
  - The Department of Defense declares that the Islamic State militant group no longer controls any territory in Syria. The U.S.-backed Syrian Democratic Forces declare victory over the group the following day.
- March 23 – For the second time in a week, a survivor of the 2018 Stoneman Douglas High School shooting in Parkland, Florida, commits suicide. On March 17, Sydney Aiello, 19, committed suicide after being diagnosed with post-traumatic stress disorder.
- March 24 – Attorney General William Barr sends members of Congress a four page letter outlining the principle conclusions of the Mueller Report.
- March 25
  - Kentucky outlaws bestiality.
  - Attorney Michael Avenatti is arrested in New York on charges of attempting to extort more than $20 million from sports company Nike. He is also charged with wire and bank fraud in a separate case in Los Angeles.
  - Jeremy Richman, father of 6-year-old Avielle Richman, who was among 20 children and six adults killed in the 2012 Sandy Hook Elementary School shooting in Newtown, Connecticut, is found dead from an apparent suicide. This follows recent suicides by two survivors of the Stoneman Douglas High School shooting.
- March 26
  - The House of Representatives fails to reach the supermajority needed to override President Trump's veto of Congress's attempt to overturn the border wall emergency declaration.
  - "Bump stocks" are made illegal in the United States.
- March 28 – The 2019 Major League Baseball season has its earliest season opener in history.
- March 29
  - A judge in eastern North Carolina declares a charter school's dress code unconstitutional.
  - Fire destroys a building that housed executive offices at the Highlander Research and Education Center in New Market, Tennessee; arson is suspected.
- March 30 – President Trump issues a new permit to construct the Keystone Pipeline.
- March 31 – A 23rd horse is reported to have died at Santa Anita racetrack in California, the latest in a string of deaths occurring since December 2018.

=== April ===
- April 1
  - Bucklew v. Precythe: the Supreme Court rules 5–4 that death row inmates are not guaranteed "painless" executions under the U.S. Constitution.
  - The U.S. halts the delivery of F-35 fighter jet-related equipment to Turkey to protest the country's planned purchasing of Russia's S-400 missile defense system.
  - The Colorado legislature passes a red flag law, allowing seizure of guns from people deemed a threat to themselves or others.
  - Two airports in New York join San Antonio International Airport in banning concessions to Chick-fil-A restaurants due to the company's anti-LGBTQ record.
  - Firefighters in Asbury Park, New Jersey put out a forest fire that burned 11,638 acres (18 square miles) in two days.
- April 2
  - Lori Lightfoot wins the run-off in the 2019 Chicago mayoral election, becoming the first black woman to hold the post and the first openly gay Chicago mayor.
  - Prosecutors in Waco, Texas decide to not go ahead with prosecution of individuals allegedly involved in the 2015 Waco shootout that left nine dead and 20 people injured.
  - An explosion at a chemical plant in Crosby, Texas leaves one dead and two injured. This comes just weeks after a similar Houston-area explosion in Deer Creek, Texas on March 17.
- April 3
  - Representative Richard Neal, chair of the House Ways and Means Committee, sends a letter to the Internal Revenue Service asking for President Trump's tax returns. Meanwhile, the House Judiciary Committee votes to subpoena the Mueller Report.
  - The Pittsburgh City Council votes for new gun laws, including a ban on certain semiautomatic assault weapons.
- April 4 – The 1973 War Powers Resolution is invoked for the first time when the House votes 247–175 to end U.S. military assistance to Saudi Arabia in its intervention in the Yemeni Civil War; the Senate voted 54–46 on the bill in March 2019. President Trump vetoes the bill on April 16, the second veto of his presidency.
- April 5 – Shazam!, directed by David F. Sandberg, is released as the seventh film in the DC Extended Universe.
- April 6
  - Arson is suspected as the cause of three fires in historically black churches since March 26 in St. Landry Parish, Louisiana. A fourth, smaller fire was set at a majority-white church in Caddo Parish on March 31. The culprit in the case of the three black churches is arrested and charged on April 11.
- April 8 – Joining Saudi Arabia and Bahrain, the Trump administration announces its intentions to designate Iran's Islamic Revolutionary Guard Corps as a terrorist group. The official designation takes place on April 15.
- April 11
  - Federal prosecutors announce a 36-count indictment against lawyer Michael Avenatti, including bank fraud, embezzlement, tax evasion and wire fraud.
  - Federal prosecutors indict Obama-era White House Counsel Greg Craig on charges of lying and hiding information related to his work for Ukraine.
  - Ohio passes legislation to ban abortion at six weeks, the fifth state to do so.
- April 15 – Former Massachusetts governor Bill Weld officially announces his candidacy in the 2020 presidential election. He will run as a Republican primary challenger to incumbent President Donald Trump, the first to do so.
- April 16 – Apple and Qualcomm settle a multi-year legal dispute regarding patent royalties. The deal between the two tech giants helps, among other arrangements, pave the way for Apple to have 5G iPhones on the market by 2020.
- April 18 – A redacted version of the final Mueller Report is released by Attorney General William Barr to Congress and the general public. The report goes into detail on findings from the 2017–2019 Special Counsel probe regarding Russian contacts with the 2016 Donald Trump election campaign and matters regarding obstruction of justice by President Trump himself.
- April 23 – Wing Aviation, a Google offshoot company, becomes the first drone delivery service to receive Air Carrier Certification from the Federal Aviation Administration.
- April 25
  - Former Vice President Joe Biden announces his candidacy for the 2020 presidential election, expanding the field to a record 20 candidates, the largest field of presidential candidates in U.S. history.
  - A manhunt is launched for man caught on CCTV attempting to set fire to the National Archives Building in Washington, D.C. The suspect, Jacob Leroy Wallace, 32, is later arrested on May 2.
- April 26 – Avengers: Endgame is released by Marvel Studios as the sequel to 2018's Avengers: Infinity War. It breaks several box office records and eventually becomes the second highest-grossing film of all time, grossing $2.798 billion.
- April 27
  - A mass shooting occurs at the Chabad of Poway synagogue in Poway, California on the last day of Passover, resulting in one death and three injuries.
  - A construction crane working on a Google office building in Seattle, Washington, collapses onto Mercer Street, killing four people and injuring four others.
- April 28 – Undersea explorer Victor Vescovo sets a new world record for the deepest ever sea dive at 10,972 metres (35,997 ft) in the Pacific Ocean's Mariana Trench. Several unusual things are discovered at the bottom, including four new species of prawn-like crustaceans and a new species of snailfish.
- April 30
  - A school shooting takes place at the University of North Carolina at Charlotte, leaving two people dead and four injured.
  - Minneapolis Police Officer Mohamed Noor is convicted of third-degree murder and manslaughter for shooting and killing Australian woman Justine Damond after she called 9-1-1 to report the possible assault of a woman.

=== May ===
- May 1 – Maine becomes the first state to ban Styrofoam containers.
- May 2
  - After designating them "dangerous individuals and organizations", social media giant Facebook purges InfoWars, Nation of Islam leader Louis Farrakhan, prominent white nationalist Paul Nehlen, right-wing figures Milo Yiannopoulos, Laura Loomer, Paul Joseph Watson and others from all of its platforms, including Instagram. After notable partisan outcry, President Trump later tweets on the matter, decrying perceived targeted censorship against conservatives on social media platforms by private corporations. Facebook responds that the bans were not ideologically motivated.
  - Mayor of Baltimore Catherine Pugh announces her resignation from office amid state and federal investigations into whether she used bulk sales of her self-published children's book to disguise kickbacks.
- May 3 – New economic data shows that the U.S. unemployment rate fell from 3.8 percent to 3.6 percent in April 2019, the lowest in 49 years, with employers adding 263,000 jobs in April versus the expected 190,000.
- May 4
  - For the first time in American history, the winners of the Miss America (Nia Franklin), Miss Teen USA (Kaliegh Garris), and Miss USA (Cheslie Kryst) beauty contests are all black women.
  - At the 2019 Kentucky Derby, longshot contender Country House wins the race after Maximum Security is disqualified, despite being the first across the finish line.
- May 5 – National security adviser John Bolton announces the U.S. will deploy the USS Abraham Lincoln (CVN-72) Carrier Strike Group and four B-52 bombers to the Middle Eastern theater to "send a clear and unmistakable message" to Iran following Israeli intelligence reports of an alleged Iranian plot to attack U.S. forces in the region. The military would later deploy the USS Arlington (LPD-24) Marine transport ship and a Patriot SAM battery to the Middle East as well.
- May 6
  - According to Gallup's tracking poll, President Donald Trump's approval rating reaches 46%, the highest of his presidency thus far.
  - Professional golfer Tiger Woods is awarded the Presidential Medal of Freedom, becoming the fourth (and the youngest) active golfer to have received the medal.
  - The Arizona Senate declares pornography to be a public health crisis.
- May 7 – A school shooting occurs at the STEM School Highlands Ranch in Douglas County, Colorado, leaving one dead and seven injured.
- May 8
  - The New York Times publishes newly obtained tax information revealing that from 1985 to 1994, Donald Trump lost $1.17 billion from his various businesses – a far greater amount than previously known, and more than any tax payer in U.S. history.
  - Denver, Colorado, becomes the first city in the U.S. to decriminalize psychedelic mushrooms, in a vote of 51 to 49%.
- May 10 – At 12:00 a.m. EST, President Trump's proposed 25 percent tariff hike on $200 billion worth of Chinese imports takes effect, escalating tensions between the two nations amid the ongoing China–United States trade war. The deadline hits as negotiations between trade representatives continued.
- May 13 – 2019 college admissions bribery scandal: Actress Felicity Huffman pleads guilty to conspiracy to commit mail fraud and honest services mail fraud and admits to paying $15,000 for a proctor to change her daughter's SAT answers.
- May 14
  - Abortion is outlawed in the state of Alabama, except for cases where a woman's life is threatened or a lethal fetal anomaly is present. The anti-abortion law, written to serve as a catalyst for a legal challenge against the Roe v. Wade ruling, is set to go into effect in November.
  - San Francisco becomes the first U.S. city to ban the use of facial recognition technology.
- May 15 – President Trump issues an executive order invoking the International Emergency Economic Powers Act in response to security threats from foreign telecom companies such as Huawei.
- May 16 – New York City mayor Bill de Blasio announces his candidacy in the 2020 presidential election, expanding the Democratic primary field to a record 24 candidates, already the largest presidential primary field for any political party in American history.
- May 17
  - The U.S. reaches a deal with Mexico and Canada to lift steel and aluminum tariffs imposed in May 2018, paving the way for further ratification of the United States–Mexico–Canada Agreement (USMCA), the trade agreement set to replace the North American Free Trade Agreement (NAFTA).
  - Japan lifts its ban on U.S. beef imports that were from cattle older than 20 months of age.
- May 17–30 – A major tornado outbreak strikes the Central United States, killing at least eight people and causing "catastrophic" damage in many areas.
- May 21 – Washington becomes the first state to legalize human composting, the right to allow people to have their body turned into soil after death. The process is seen as an alternative to traditional cremations and burials.
- May 22 – The Alabama Historical Commission announces that the wreckage of the Clotilda, the last known slave ship to bring African slaves to the United States during the Atlantic slave trade, is found in the Mobile River.
- May 23 – California native John Walker Lindh, a former Taliban fighter and the first person to be convicted of a crime in the war on terror, is released from federal prison after serving 17 years of a 20-year sentence.
- May 24
  - President Trump authorizes the deployment of 1,500 additional troops to the Middle East amid regional tensions with Iran.
  - Federal judge Carlton Reeves temporarily blocks a Mississippi law banning abortions after the sixth week of pregnancy.
- May 26 – Simon Pagenaud wins the Indianapolis 500, driving a Dallara-Chevrolet for Team Penske. It was Pagenaud's first win in the event and Penske's 18th.
- May 30
  - 2019 measles outbreak: The Centers for Disease Control and Prevention reports that, thus far in 2019, there have been 971 cases of measles in the U.S., the highest level in more than 25 years.
  - President Trump announces his intentions to apply a 5 percent tariff on all Mexican imports, effective June 10, to pressure Mexico to do more to crack down on a surge in Central American migrants trying to cross the U.S. southern border. The tariffs are to increase to 10 percent on July 1, and by another 5 percent each month for three months. The tariffs are averted on June 7.
  - Louisiana bans abortions at six weeks of pregnancy, joining five other states that have passed six-week abortion bans.
  - New Hampshire becomes the 21st state to abolish the death penalty.
- May 31 – 12 people are killed, including the perpetrator, and four are injured in a mass shooting at a municipal center in Virginia Beach, Virginia.

=== June ===
- June 3 – Jay-Z becomes the first hip-hop billionaire, according to Forbes magazine.
- June 7 – NASA announces that, beginning in 2020, the International Space Station will be commercialized, allowing private companies to use the station to conduct for-profit activities, including marketing, advertising and space manufacturing.
- June 10
  - United Technologies and Raytheon agree to a merger. The resultant company is projected to be the second largest defense and aerospace contractor in the U.S.
- June 11 – Alabama legalizes chemical castration as a stipulation for child sex offenders applying for parole; the law goes into effect September 1.
- June 12
  - Illinois Governor J. B. Pritzker signs a law making abortion a "fundamental right" for pregnant individuals in the state.
  - At least two dozen police officers and two journalists are injured in overnight riots in Memphis, Tennessee after U.S. Marshals kill a 20-year-old black man, Brandon Webber, during an attempted arrest.
  - The St. Louis Blues defeat the Boston Bruins 4 games to 3, to win their first Stanley Cup Championship.
- June 14 – Gov. Ron DeSantis signs a bill making Florida the 12th state to ban sanctuary cities.
- June 17 - Amphibia debuts on Disney Channel.
- June 18 – Twelve Federal Police agents are sentenced to 34 years of prison for the August 24, 2012 murder of two CIA agents in Tres Marias, Morelos, Mexico.
- June 19 – Keith Raniere, leader of sex cult NXIVM, is found guilty of all charges against him in a New York court.
- June 20 – 2019 Iranian shoot-down of American drone: President Trump orders then aborts conventional military strikes against Iran after the shoot-down of an RQ-4A surveillance drone over the Strait of Hormuz. He reportedly approves cyber attacks against Iranian missile systems.
- June 21
  - Journalist and advice columnist E. Jean Carroll accuses President Trump of having sexually assaulted her in a Bergdorf Goodman department store dressing room in the mid-1990s.
  - Pixar Animation Studios' 21st feature film, Toy Story 4, the sequel to 2010's Toy Story 3, is released in theaters.
- June 23 – In a public stunt, two members of The Flying Wallendas successfully walk a quarter-mile tightrope 25 stories above Times Square.
- June 24 – President Trump signs an executive order sanctioning Iranian Supreme Leader Ali Khamenei, the first such sanctions in history.
- June 25 – San Francisco becomes the first major U.S. city to ban the sale of e-cigarettes.
- June 27
  - Rucho v. Common Cause and Benisek v. Lamone: The Supreme Court rules 5–4 that federal courts are constitutionally powerless to hear challenges to excessive partisan gerrymandering, leaving it up to states and Congress to legally address the issue.
  - During a 2020 Democratic Party presidential primaries debate, Moderator and NBC "Today" host Savannah Guthrie asked the 10 Democratic primary candidates on stage if their health plans would provide coverage for the estimated 11 million people living in the U.S. illegally. Every candidate raised their hands. One study predicts this would cost American taxpayers up to $23 billion a year.
- June 30
  - During a three-way meeting at the Korean Demilitarized Zone with South and North Korean leaders, President Trump becomes the first sitting U.S. president to set foot on North Korean territory. Both Trump and North Korean leader Kim Jong-un pledge to restart stalled nuclear negotiations between the two countries.
  - Ten people are killed when a twin-engine Beechcraft BE-350 King Air crashes into a hangar, shortly after take-off at Addison Airport, Texas.
- Date unknown – According to CNN and Financial Times reports, President Trump promised Chinese President Xi Jinping that the US would remain quiet on pro-democracy protests in Hong Kong while trade talks continued.

=== July ===
- July 2 – Spider-Man: Far from Home, directed by Jon Watts, is released by Marvel Studios and Columbia Pictures as the 23rd film of the Marvel Cinematic Universe (MCU), the final film in its "Phase Three" slate, the final installment in its self-styled "Infinity Saga" and the sequel to 2017's Spider-Man: Homecoming.
- July 4
  - In a one-hour Independence Day event titled Salute to America, President Donald Trump becomes the first U.S. president in nearly seven decades to address a crowd at the National Mall during the holiday. President Harry Truman had previously done so in 1951.
  - Southern California is hit by a 6.4 magnitude earthquake, the largest in the region since 1994.
- July 5 – A second, stronger earthquake of 7.1 magnitude hits Southern California. There are no reported casualties.
- July 6
  - Billionaire financier and registered sex offender Jeffrey Epstein is arrested on federal charges of sex trafficking and additionally charged by the Southern District of New York with sex trafficking and with conspiracy to traffic minors in Florida and New York.
  - At least 20 people are injured, two seriously, by an apparent gas explosion at a shopping mall in Plantation, Florida.
- July 7 – The U.S. women's soccer team wins their fourth World Cup, defending their status as the No. 1 team in the world and renewing their campaign for pay equity.
- July 9 – Billionaire Tom Steyer announces his candidacy for the 2020 U.S. presidential election, on the Democratic Party ticket.
- July 11
  - The Dow Jones Industrial Average exceeds 27,000 points for the first time in its history.
  - Singer R. Kelly is arrested in Chicago on federal sex trafficking charges—it is the first time he faces federal criminal charges.
- July 12
  - Labor Secretary Alexander Acosta announces his resignation amid controversy over his prosecution of a 2007 sex crimes case against Jeffrey Epstein, the details of which resurfaced following Epstein's July 6 arrest.
  - In a 3–2 vote, the Federal Trade Commission approves a record $5 billion fine on Facebook to settle an investigation into data privacy violations.
- July 13
  - A blackout occurs in Manhattan's West Side, affecting 73,000 customers. The blackout occurs exactly 42 years after the New York City blackout of 1977.
  - Hurricane Barry approaches the Gulf Coast, becoming the first hurricane of the 2019 season, with a sustained wind speed of 75 mph (120 km/h).
  - Willem Van Spronsen, a self-described Antifa member armed with a rifle and incendiary devices, attacks an Immigration and Customs Enforcement detention center in Washington state. Van Spronsen fires several shots at the detention center, throws incendiary devices, and sets vehicles on fire. While attempting to ignite a propane tank, Van Spronsen is shot and killed by Tacoma police officers.
- July 14 – President Trump sparks controversy over remarks directed at four Democratic congresswomen that were widely perceived as racist; Trump sharply denies the comments were racist. The House of Representatives votes 240–187 to condemn the President's remarks two days later. The controversy persisted as Trump supporters chanted similar remarks at a subsequent rally in Greenville, North Carolina on July 18. Trump disavowed the chant the next day.
- July 16–20 – The 50th anniversary of the Apollo 11 mission is observed.
- July 17 – Joaquín "El Chapo" Guzmán, former head of the Sinaloa cartel, which became the biggest supplier of drugs to the US, is sentenced to life in prison plus 30 years.
- July 24 – Ricardo Rosselló, governor of Puerto Rico, announces he will resign on August 2 following revelations of his participation in a chat group with sexist, profane, and homophobic comments.
- July 25
  - Attorney General William Barr reinstates the death penalty for federal crimes. The federal government also schedules the execution of five death row inmates.
  - Senate Majority Leader Mitch McConnell blocks legislation to improve election security less than 24 hours after Special Counsel Robert Mueller warns of the continued threat of interference in American elections.
  - Sixteen Marines are arrested at Camp Pendleton, California for human trafficking and drug-related offenses. Two others had been arrested on July 3.
  - Five women (Alexandria "Ally" Kostial, 21; Zaria Newton, 20; Arykah Patrice White, 16; Lisa Nguyen, 59; and Shayna Catherine Cline, 19) are killed in Mississippi in separate incidents within 24 hours. All five were killed by firearms.
  - Three students from the University of Mississippi, members of Kappa Alpha Order a fraternity at the University, post a photo on Instagram taken at the Emmett Till Memorial that is widely seen as racist. The students are suspended by the fraternity but not charged with a hate crime.
- July 26 – Cindy Lovell discovers the long-sought signature of Samuel Langhorne Clemens, whose pen name was Mark Twain, inside the Mark Twain Cave in Hannibal, Missouri.
- July 27 – Logan Paul hosts the Challenger Games at Long Beach City College in California. Notable participants included Tobi Brown, Jake Paul, and Deestroying.
- July 28 – Four people, including the shooter, are killed and twelve others injured in a mass shooting in Gilroy, California.
- July 30 – The InterContinental Hotels Group (IHG), owner of Holiday Inn and other hotels, announces it will stop using small soap and shampoo containers in order to cut down on plastic waste. Marriott International and Hilton Hotels & Resorts have made similar announcements.
- July 31
  - The Federal Reserve cuts interest rates for the first time since 2008, with a 0.25% reduction to a baseline level of 2–2.25%.
  - Leslie McCrae Dowless faces new charges of electoral fraud in North Carolina. Dowless was arrested in 2017 and charged with trying to rig the election in North Carolina's 9th Congressional District in favor of Mark Harris, the Republican candidate.

=== August ===
- August 2
  - The U.S. officially withdraws from the Intermediate-Range Nuclear Forces Treaty established with Russia in 1987.
  - Dozens of jailed immigrants are pepper-sprayed by Immigration and Customs Enforcement (ICE) agents during a protest in Bossier Parish, Louisiana.
  - Puerto Rico governor Ricardo Rossello resigns, and Pedro Pierluisi (who was appointed secretary of state on July 31) takes the oath of office to succeed him.
- August 3 – 2019 El Paso shooting: A mass shooting occurs at a Walmart near the Cielo Vista Mall in El Paso, Texas, resulting in 23 fatalities and 23 injured.
- August 4 – 2019 Dayton shooting: A mass shooting occurs in the Oregon Historic District in downtown Dayton, Ohio, resulting in 10 fatalities (including the perpetrator) and 27 injuries.
- August 7 – The Supreme Court of Puerto Rico rules that Pedro Pierluisi's swearing in as governor was unconstitutional and removes him from office. Secretary of Justice Wanda Vázquez Garced becomes governor.
- August 8 – The largest U.S. immigration raids in a decade result in 680 arrests in Mississippi.
- August 9 – The North Dakota Supreme Court upholds a voting law that disenfranchises 10% of the state's Native Americans.
- August 10
  - 2020 Democratic candidates for president speak at a gun forum sponsored by Everytown for Gun Safety, in Des Moines, Iowa.
  - The FBI, the Justice Department's inspector general and the New York City medical examiner launch inquiries following the death of Jeffrey Epstein in a Manhattan jail while awaiting trial on sex trafficking charges.
- August 12
  - The Trump administration issues new rules that reject applicants for temporary or permanent visas for failing to meet income standards or for receiving public assistance such as welfare, food stamps, public housing or Medicaid.
  - The Department of Interior revises its implementation of the Endangered Species Act of 1973 including preventing the Fish and Wildlife Service from automatically offering full endangered species protections to wildlife classified as "threatened".
  - FBI agents raid Little Saint James, then Jeffrey Epstein's private Caribbean island amid ongoing investigations into alleged sex trafficking.
- August 14
  - An employee of the U.S. Immigration and Customs Enforcement drives a truck through a group of peaceful protesters from Never Again Action, injuring several.
  - Mylan N.V., Teva Pharmaceutical Industries Ltd., and Heritage Pharmaceuticals Inc. are accused of blocking a Congressional investigation into rising drug prices.
- August 15
  - Former Colorado governor John Hickenlooper withdraws from the 2020 presidential election campaign.
  - The government of Israel denies visas to Representative Ilhan Omar (D-MN) and Rashida Tlaib (D-MI).
- August 16 – Denmark rejects the suggestion that the United States might purchase Greenland.
- August 17 – Protests are held in Portland that rally: Proud Boys Three Percenters, a “patriot movement” militia group, and American Guard. They are met with three times as many counter protesters.
- August 17–18 – Anti-gun rallies are held in over 100 cities in all 50 states.
- August 20 – Richard Ross Jr., police commissioner of Philadelphia, resigns amid allegations that members of his department engaged in sexual harassment and racial and gender discrimination against women serving in the ranks.
- August 21 – Washington governor Jay Inslee announces the end of his 2020 presidential bid.
- August 22 – A federal grand jury in Los Angeles charges 80 people, mostly Nigerians, in a conspiracy to steal and then launder millions of dollars. 14 people are arrested.
- August 23
  - The first recorded death due to vaping is announced by the Centers for Disease Control and Prevention (CDC), amid concern over a mystery lung disease in the United States, linked to the use of e-cigarettes.
  - NASCAR bans advertisements of “assault-style rifles/sniper rifles.”
- August 26 – Johnson & Johnson is ordered to pay $572 million for contributing to the opioid crisis in Oklahoma.
- August 28
  - New York senator Kirsten Gillibrand withdraws from the 2020 Democratic Party presidential primaries.
  - 16-year-old Swedish student Greta Thunberg arrives in New York Harbor after sailing across the Atlantic. Thunberg plans to testify at a UN summit on zero emissions.
- August 29 – Federal judge Amy Totenberg rules that the state of Georgia must replace all of its voting machines or use paper ballots in time for the March 24, 2020 presidential primary election. Several faulty voting machines were reported during the Mississippi gubernatorial primary on August 27.
- August 31 – Midland–Odessa shootings: Seven people are killed and 21 others wounded in a spree shooting in West Texas, between the cities of Midland and Odessa. The suspect is shot and killed by police outside a movie theater in Odessa.

=== September ===
- September 2 – An early-morning fire on a dive boat off San Miguel Island and Santa Cruz Island, California results in 25 dead and 9 missing.
- September 3
  - The San Francisco Board of Supervisors passes a resolution calling the National Rifle Association of America a "domestic terrorist organization".
  - Walmart announces they will stop selling handgun ammunition and certain types of ammo for short-barrelled rifles. Kroger asks shoppers to refrain from openly carrying guns even if it is legal. Other major retailers follow suit.
  - The Cherokee Nation names an official delegate to the United States Congress for the first time.
- September 4 – CNN hosts ten town hall meetings for as many Democratic presidential hopefuls to discuss climate change.
- September 6
  - Hurricane Dorian makes landfall on Cape Hatteras, North Carolina as a Category 1 storm. 350,000 residents and businesses in North Carolina and South Carolina are left without electricity.
  - Following three deaths, the Centers for Disease Control and Prevention recommends against the use of electronic cigarettes.
  - The Artificial Intelligence and Technology Office (AITO) is established, as part of the Department of Energy.
- September 7 – President Trump announces he called off planned Camp David peace talks with the Taliban after they claimed responsibility for the September 5th Kabul bombings which killed a U.S. soldier.
- September 8 – Mark Sanford, former governor and US representative from South Carolina announces his candidacy for the 2020 Republican presidential nomination.
- September 9 – The inspector general of Intelligence, Michael Atkinson, notifies the House Intelligence Committee about an "urgent" and "credible" whistleblower complaint involving an apparent July 25 telephone call in which President Donald Trump promised Ukrainian president Volodymyr Zelenskyy $250 million if he would reopen an investigation into Hunter Biden son of former Vice President Joe Biden. The White House denies doing anything wrong and refuses to release the complaint.
- September 10
  - National Security Advisor John R. Bolton is dismissed by President Trump.
  - Two former senior FEMA officials are arrested on charges of bribery in relation to Hurricane Maria relief.
- September 12
  - Former Illinois and Florida nursing home owner Philip Esformes is convicted of $1.3 billion Medicare fraud and sentenced to 20 years in prison.
  - During the third 2020 Democratic Party presidential primaries debate Democratic presidential candidate Beto O'Rourke, arguing for a mandatory buyback of assault weapons, declares, “Hell yes, we are going to take your AR-15, AK-47.”
- September 13 – Actress Felicity Huffman is sentenced to 14 days in prison, a fine of $30,000 and 250 hours of community service for her involvement in the college admissions scandal.
- September 15 – Drug company Purdue Pharma files for bankruptcy in response to lawsuits related to the opioid epidemic.
- September 16
  - 48,000 union members of the United Automobile Workers go on strike against General Motors.
  - Saturday Night Live fires comedian Shane Gillis after his anti-Asian and anti-gay videos come to light. Presidential candidate Andrew Yang, who is Taiwanese-American and was called a “Jew c***k,” forgives Gillis.

September 17

  - Interest rates on repurchase agreements (or "repos") in the United States experience a sudden and unexpected spike.
  - 33 inches of rain from Tropical Storm Imelda falls on Hamshire and other areas of southeastern Texas, causing severe flooding.
- September 18 – President Donald Trump revokes California's authority to set its own auto emission standards.
- September 19
  - President and CEO Dennis Veilleux of gun manufacturer Colt announces the company will stop producing rifles such as the AR-15 for personal use.
  - 30 Afghan nut farmers are killed and 40 injured in a U.S. drone attack in Nangarhar Province.
  - HUD Secretary Ben Carson is accused by members of his department of making transphobic remarks at a meeting in San Francisco. He says his comments about "big, hairy men" using women's homeless shelters were a "mischaracterization."
  - Six-year-old Kaia Rolle is handcuffed, fingerprinted, mug-shot, and charged with battery after throwing a tantrum at Lucious and Emma Nixon Academy, a charter school in Orlando, Florida. The same police officer also arrested an eight-year-old in an unrelated incident the same day. The officer was subsequently suspended.
- September 20
  - Thousands of students across the United States join their counterparts world-wide in demonstrations against climate change. The demonstrations are led by 16-year-old Swedish activist Greta Thunberg and 12-year-old Colorado activist Haven Coleman.
  - New York Mayor Bill de Blasio announces his withdrawal from the 2020 Democratic Party presidential primaries.
  - Ten Democratic presidential candidates participate in an LGBTQ Forum sponsored by GLAAD, The Advocate, One Iowa, and The Gazette.
  - The proposed "invasion" by 2,000,000 truth-seekers of the classified Air Force base known as Area 51 falls short of its goal by about 1,999,970 participants. Only the Pentagon takes it seriously, threatening to bomb participants. They later apologize.
- September 21
  - President Donald Trump approves deployment of several hundred troops and military equipment including Patriot missiles to Saudi Arabia and United Arab Emirates following the September 14 attack on Saudi oil refineries.
  - At least five deaths are reported due to Tropical Storm Imelda in southeast Texas. 40 inches (101.6 cm) of rain falls in 72 hours in one of the wettest tropical storms in American history.
  - Greek police arrest a 65-year-old Lebanese suspect in the 1985 hijacking of TWA Flight 847 and the death of U.S. Navy Petty Officer Robert Stethem.
  - The Federal Bureau of Investigation announces a $15,000 reward in search of individuals involved in three arson attacks on Roman Catholic churches that serve Hispanics and migrants in El Paso, Texas.
- September 22 – Three men are dead and four are hospitalized due to a mysterious "medical situation" in Pittsburgh. All are believed to be middle-aged men, and all were wearing orange wristbands.
- September 24
  - Speaker of the House Nancy Pelosi announces the start of a formal impeachment inquiry against President Trump.
  - The United States Navy announces three suicides aboard the USS George H.W. Bush in one week.
- September 25 – The White House releases details of a July 25 phone call between President Trump and Volodymyr Zelenskyy, in which Trump asks the Ukrainian President to investigate Democratic presidential candidate Joe Biden.
- September 26 – The Trump administration says it plans to allow only 18,000 refugees to resettle in the United States in the 2020 fiscal year, its lowest level since the modern program began in 1980.
- September 27
  - The New York Times reports that Wayne LaPierre, chief of the National Rifle Association of America offered President Trump "financial support for the president's defense" if the president will "stop the games" on gun-control legislation. The NRA denies any wrongdoing.
  - Kurt Volker, special envoy to Ukraine, resigns.
- September 28
  - Sixty-seven climate change protesters are arrested at a coal plant in Bow, New Hampshire.
  - Coal miners in Cumberland, Kentucky have called off the protest that began two months ago against their employer, Blackjewel, when the company suddenly declared bankruptcy and did not pay their wages. They intend to continue their fight in court.
- September 30
  - New York Congressman Chris Collins resigns and then pleads guilty to insider trading and lying to the FBI.
  - California governor Gavin Newsom signs a law over the objections of the National Collegiate Athletic Association that allows college athletes to be financially compensated for the use of their names, images, and likenesses.

=== October ===
- October 1
  - The first cannabis cafe in the United States opens in Los Angeles, California.
  - The Florida Department of Education announces that some teachers in some districts will be allowed to carry guns in schools.
- October 2
  - Gabby Giffords and March for Our Lives host a forum on gun safety for 2020 presidential candidates in Las Vegas, Nevada. Nine candidates laid out plans for stronger gun control. Senator Bernie Sanders does not attend as he is recovering from an operation.
  - Senate Democrats ask the IRS to revoke the tax-exempt status of the National Rifle Association of America (NRA).
  - California becomes the second state, after North Dakota, to allow the establishment of public banks as an alternative to commercial banks. The idea is to provide low-interest loans for businesses, affordable housing, and municipal infrastructure.
  - Dallas police officer Amber Guyger is sentenced to 10 years in prison after being found guilty of murdering Botham Jean in his home. This is the first time a white female police officer has been convicted of murdering an unarmed black man. Joshua Brown, a key witness in the trial, is killed two days later.
  - Ten anti-drone protesters are arrested at Creech Air Force Base in Nevada.
- October 3
  - Finland agrees to return Native American remains and other artifacts stolen in 1891 to Mesa Verde National Park in Colorado.
  - CNN refuses to run an ad for the Donald Trump 2020 presidential campaign, saying it includes false claims against former Vice President Joe Biden. Fox News rejects a request from the Joe Biden 2020 presidential campaign to not run the ad either.
  - President Trump calls on Ukraine and China to investigate former Vice President Joe Biden and his son Hunter Biden.
  - The Washington Post reports an Internal Revenue Service employee filed a whistleblower complaint reporting that an unnamed political appointee at the United States Department of the Treasury tried to interfere with the tax audits for President Trump or Vice President Mike Pence.
  - European Commission spokesperson Daniel Rosario threatens retaliatory measures if the United States imposes a US$7.5 billion (€6.823 billion) tariff on products such as olives, whiskey, wine, cheese, yogurt, and airplanes. The tariffs are scheduled to take effect on October 18.
- October 4
  - Microsoft says a group called Phosphorus, which is linked to the Iranian government, has attempted to hack accounts belonging to American journalists, former government officials, and the 2020 United States presidential election, as well as prominent Iranians living outside Iran.
  - The Bureau of Land Management ends a five-year moratorium on leasing federal land in California to fossil fuel companies, opening 725,000 acres (1100 sq. miles; 29,000 ha) to drilling in San Benito, Monterey, and Fresno counties.
  - Defense Secretary Mark Esper says the United States has picked up its attacks in Afghanistan since peace talks with the Taliban fell apart last month. In August, Politico reported that the U.S. troop strength is about 13,000, fewer than the authorized 14,000.
  - A report by the Associated Press finds that 1,700 Roman Catholic priests accused of being sex offenders live freely in the United States.
  - Joker is released in theatres.
- October 7 – Federal judge Victor Marrero orders Trump to turn over eight years of tax returns, saying he cannot endorse a "categorical and limitless assertion of presidential immunity from judicial process." An appeals court grants a temporary stay of the order.
- October 9 – The Wall Street Journal reports that two foreign-born businessmen, close associates of Rudy Giuliani, have been arrested on campaign finance violation charges. Igor Fruman (Belarusian) and Lev Parnas (Ukrainian), worked with Giuliani in trying to convince the Ukraine government to find dirt on former Vice President Joe Biden.
- October 11
  - President Trump's 4th U.S. Homeland Security Advisor, Kevin McAleenan, resigns.
  - Marie Yovanovitch, the former ambassador to Ukraine, testifies at the Impeachment inquiry against Donald Trump. Former diplomats and oversight committee members praise Yovanovitch's "bravery" for testifying in response to a subpoena but in defiance of a State Department order.
  - 100,000 people in northern Los Angeles County, California are evacuated as the Saddle Ridge Fire grows to more than 7,500 acres and is 13% contained. 25 homes are destroyed and one death is reported.
  - Defense Secretary Mark Esper announces that the U.S. is sending additional troops and weapons to Saudi Arabia.
- October 12
  - Students at Georgia Southern University burn books written by Jennine Capó Crucet, a Cuban-American author, who had been invited to the school to discuss white privilege.
  - Democratic incumbent Governor of Louisiana John Bel Edwards is narrowly forced into a run-off in his bid for a second term. He advances to a runoff (November 16) with wealthy Republican businessman Eddie Rispone.
  - Two people are killed and 20 injured when a Hard Rock Hotel and Casino under construction in downtown New Orleans partially collapses.
- October 14 – Indigenous Peoples' Day is celebrated in Alaska, Minnesota, and North Carolina as well as several cities.
- October 15 – Twelve Democratic presidential candidates appear on the same stage at Otterbein University in Westerville, Ohio in a debate sponsored by The New York Times and CNN.
- October 18
  - The United States Department of State finishes its investigation into Hillary Clinton's email controversy, citing violations by 38 people, some of whom may be punished. The State Department determined that there was "deliberate mishandling of classified information".
  - The Bureau of Population, Refugees, and Migration announces that refugee flights to the United States have been canceled for the second time, as refugees are capped at 18,000.
- October 19 – 26,000 people attend a campaign rally for Bernie Sanders in Long Island City, Queens, New York.
- October 21
  - Four drug companies, McKesson Corporation, Cardinal Health, AmerisourceBergen, and Teva Pharmaceutical Industries, reach a $260 million out-of-court settlement with Summit County and Cuyahoga County, Ohio in the Opioid epidemic in the United States.
  - Thirty Republican Members of the House of Representatives, led by Matt Gaetz, storm a secure hearing room and violate security precautions, demanding they be allowed to participate in the Impeachment inquiry against Donald Trump despite not being members of the committees that are investigating the president.
- October 23 – Google announces that its 53-qubit 'Sycamore' processor has achieved quantum supremacy.
- October 24
  - Representative Tim Ryan withdraws from the 2020 Democratic Party presidential primaries.
  - Senator Kamala Harris announces she is withdrawing from the October 25–27 Second Step Presidential Justice Forum at Benedict College in Columbia, South Carolina, after learning that President Trump was scheduled to receive an award. Former Vice President Joe Biden, Senator Elizabeth Warren, Senator Bernie Sanders, Mayor Pete Buttigieg, former Secretary Julian Castro, Senator Amy Klobuchar, Representative John Delaney, and Representative Tulsi Gabbard are still expected to attend. Trump receives the award for his leadership in the passage of the First Step Act.
- October 25
  - The longest strike in General Motors' history ends when 57% of the members of the United Automobile Workers union vote to ratify a contract.
  - Journalist Max Blumenthal ("The Grayzone") is arrested and charged with assault in a case related to a May 7 incident at the Venezuelan embassy in Washington, DC.
- October 26
  - Senator Kamala Harris reverses herself on participation in the "Second Step Justice Forum" after 20/20 Club drops its sponsorship. Senator Cory Booker announces he will attend also.
  - Two are killed and at least twelve injured at a shooting during a party in Greenville, Texas, celebrating the homecoming of Texas A&M University–Commerce.
- October 27
  - President Trump announces that the leader of the Islamic State of Iraq and the Levant, Abu Bakr al-Baghdadi, was killed in a U.S. special forces operation on October 26. It was reported that Baghdadi detonated a suicide vest after being chased into a tunnel.
  - Representative Katie Hill resigns amid accusations she had an illicit sexual relationship with a staff member. Hill denies the accusation.
  - 200,000 people evacuate wildfires in Northern California that destroy 79 structures including 31 homes. Governor Gavin Newsom declares a state of emergency.
- October 28
  - A North Carolina court rules that the state can't proceed with next year's House primary elections due to political gerrymandering.
  - On his first visit to Chicago, President Donald Trump calls the city "embarrassing to us as a nation" and blasts the police superintendent for not attending his speech at the International Association of Chiefs of Police. Thousands protest against Trump, who called for "a surge," or militarization, of the nation's police.
- October 29
  - The National Collegiate Athletic Association announces they will allow college athletes to be paid. New rules must be ready no later than January 2021.
  - A rupture occurs in the Keystone Pipeline near Edinburg, North Dakota with an estimated 9,120 barrels spilled. This is the second significant spill in two years.
  - Murray Energy files for Chapter 11 bankruptcy protection.
- October 30
  - Dr. Michael Baden, one of the world's leading forensic pathologists, describes his findings of the Jeffrey Epstein suicide, noting that the financier's injuries appeared more consistent with murder than suicide, contradicting an earlier report by the New York City Medical Examiner. Dr. Barbara Sampson, the chief Medical Examiner, sticks by the original finding that Epstein's death was due to suicide by hanging.
  - Wildfires rage across California, with a rare "extreme red-flag warning" issued from weather officials, as gusts exceed 70 mph (113 km/h).
  - The Federal Reserve lowers its benchmark interest rate by a quarter point, to a range of 1.5% to 1.75%, the third cut in four months.
  - Social media website Twitter bans all political advertising worldwide.
  - The Washington Nationals defeat the Houston Astros in the seventh and deciding game of the 2019 World Series, capturing their first championship in franchise history.
- October 31
  - The House of Representatives votes 232–196 in favor of formally proceeding with an impeachment inquiry against President Trump.
  - The United States Department of the Treasury announces that federal debt surpasses $23 trillion for the first time. This is a 16% increase since Donald Trump became president in 2017.
  - Five are killed and four wounded in a shooting at a house party in Orinda, California.

=== November ===
- November 1
  - Former Representative Beto O'Rourke suspends his campaign for the 2020 Democratic Party presidential nomination.
  - A law that allows almost all citizens to open carry guns goes into effect in Oklahoma.
  - Oklahoma commutes 500 prison sentences, the largest number in the state's history.
- November 2 – The Washington Post reports that the United States-Mexico Border Wall has been easily breached multiple times using inexpensive and easily attainable electric saws.
- November 3
  - President Trump threatens to cut off federal aid to combat California wildfires.
  - McDonald's CEO Steve Easterbrook is fired for having a consensual relationship with an employee.
- November 5
  - The Federal Communications Commission approves a merger between T-Mobile and Sprint Corporation.
  - The 2019 United States elections are held.
  - 2019 Virginia Senate election & 2019 Virginia House of Delegates election: Democrats take control of the legislature for the first time in twenty years.
  - New York City voters approve a ballot measure that would establish ranked-choice voting in primary and special elections for all local offices beginning in 2021.
- November 6
  - Donald Trump Jr. Tweets a Breitbart News link purportedly revealing the name of the whistleblower whose allegations started the Impeachment inquiry against Donald Trump. Sen. Rand Paul (R-KY) called for the media to release the person's name. Rep. Louie Gohmert (R-Texas), said the name out loud in a hearing unrelated to the impeachment inquiry.
  - The San Francisco Chronicle publishes a report that says the Halloween shooting at an Airbnb rental property in Orinda, California is part of a pattern of violence at such parties, involving the shooting of 42 people and 17 deaths.
  - Transcripts released from the closed-door hearings of the impeachment inquiry against Donald Trump reveal that witnesses were concerned about a quid pro quo (English: "this for that") holding up millions of dollars in aid to Ukraine in return for dirt on Hunter Biden and his father, former Vice President Joe Biden. Witnesses were Marie Yovanovitch and Michael McKinley, Bill Taylor, Gordon Sondland and Kurt Volker, George Kent, Alexander Vindman, Fiona Hill, and Laura Cooper. Lawyer Rudy Giuliani hires three attorneys as his dealings in Ukraine have attracted the scrutiny of federal prosecutors and House impeachment investigators.
- November 7
  - Two former Twitter employees are charged with spying for Saudi Arabia. Ahmad Abouammo, a U.S. citizen, was arrested in Seattle on November 3, but Ali Alzabarah, a Saudi citizen, is presumably back in the Middle East.
  - The Weather Channel, Mother Jones, and "Climate Desk" sponsor a one-hour special about Climate change mitigation featuring five Democratic and three Republican candidates in the 2020 United States presidential election.
- November 8
  - Transform Holdco LLC, which purchased nearly all of the assets of Sears Holdings Corp in February, announces that it will be closing 96 Sears and K-Mart stores across the country.
  - By filing as a candidate in Alabama, former New York mayor Michael Bloomberg officially declares his candidacy for the 2020 Democratic Party presidential nomination.
- November 9 – KSI wins his rematch against fellow youtuber Logan Paul in both of their professional boxing debuts.
- November 10 – MLS Cup 2019: The Seattle Sounders FC defeat the Toronto FC 3–1 to win their second MLS Cup.
- November 12
  - The Southern Poverty Law Center publishes a report accusing White House aid Stephen Miller of promoting white nationalism. Eventually over 80 Democratic Members of Congress call on him to resign
  - Disney+ is launched.
- November 13
  - The first public hearings of the Trump impeachment inquiry are held, beginning with Bill Taylor and George Kent.
  - United States Department of Justice proposes a program to reduce gun violence.
- November 14
  - A mass shooting occurs at Saugus High School in Santa Clarita, California, resulting in 3 deaths (including the perpetrator) and 3 injuries.
  - Managing director of Bain Capital and former Governor of Massachusetts Deval Patrick announces his candidacy for President.
  - New Jersey demands Uber pay $640 million in taxes and fines for wrongly classifying employees as independent contract workers.
  - Taylor Swift says talent agent Scooter Braun and her former label CEO Scott Borchetta are prohibiting her from performing some of her old songs.
- November 15
  - President Trump pardons two officers convicted of war crimes and restores the rank to a third.
  - Roger Stone is found guilty on all seven felony counts over lying to Congress and witness tampering.
- November 17 – Four people are killed and six are wounded in a shooting at a football-watch party in Fresno, California.
- November 18 – Smithsonian National Zoo returns a four year-old giant panda named "Bei Bei" to China.
- November 19 - Representative Eric Swalwell farts aloud while being interviewed on MSNBC by Chris Matthews, sparking #FartGate online. Swalwell denies ripping the fart and pins the blame on either Matthews or a moving mug.
- November 20
  - At the Trump impeachment hearing, Gordon Sondland states that there was a quid pro quo in the Ukraine scandal, pushed by Rudy Giuliani and ordered by Trump.
  - The fifth Democratic Party presidential debate is held in Atlanta and hosted by MSNBC and The Washington Post.
- November 21 – At a showcase in Los Angeles, Tesla CEO Elon Musk unveils the Tesla Cybertruck, the company's first electric pickup truck.
- November 22
  - Walt Disney Animation Studios' 58th animated film, Frozen 2, a sequel to 2013's Frozen, is released in theaters. Although critical reception is not as strong as its predecessor (though still positive), it is, to date, the animation studio's biggest commercial success (earning $1.450 billion), the tenth highest-grossing film of all time and the second highest-grossing animated film of all time behind The Lion King remake earlier in the year.
  - A Fred Rogers film A Beautiful Day in the Neighborhood, directed by Marielle Heller is released in theaters.
- November 23 – More than 100 students and alumni from Harvard and Yale protest the universities' complicity in climate change by running onto the field during half-time at the annual Harvard–Yale football game.
- November 24
  - Former New York Mayor Michael Bloomberg, 77, officially announces his campaign for the 2020 Democratic Party presidential nomination.
  - President Trump orders Defense Secretary Mark Esper to fire Navy Secretary Richard Spencer after the latter removes Eddie Gallagher from SEAL Team 7.
- November 25
  - President Trump signs the Preventing Animal Cruelty and Torture Act (PACT Act) into law, making animal cruelty a federal felony. The bill expands on 2010 legislation that made creation or distribution of "animal crushing" videos illegal.
  - Conan, the Special Operations Military Working Dog that participated in the raid on ISIL leader Abu Bakr al-Baghdadi, is honored at the White House.
  - Federal judge Ketanji Brown Jackson rules that former White House counsel Don McGahn must testify to House impeachment investigators. The Justice Department plans to appeal the ruling.
- November 27 – The federal government passes the Hong Kong Human Rights and Democracy Act.

=== December ===
- December 1
  - The White House announces that President Donald Trump will not participate in the House Judiciary Committee impeachment hearing on December 3.
  - Former Representative Joe Sestak withdraws from the 2020 Democratic Party presidential primaries.
  - Energy Secretary Rick Perry resigns.
- December 2
  - Former Montana Governor Steve Bullock withdraws from the 2020 Democratic Party presidential primaries.
  - Representative Duncan Hunter (R-CA) pleads guilty to corruption charges and resigns from Congress.
  - At least six people die in Thanksgiving-weekend storms. More than 150 flights are canceled and 900 are delayed.
- December 3
  - Senator Kamala Harris suspends her campaign for the 2020 Democratic Party presidential nomination.
  - The House Intelligence Committee releases a report accusing President Donald Trump of using his office to further his personal interests.
- December 5 – Huawei submits a petition in the United States Court of Appeals for the Fifth Circuit against the FCC's decision to prohibit rural U.S. network providers from using equipment from the China-based vendor due to national security concerns, asking that the recent FCC order be overturned.
- December 6
  - Four people die in a mass shooting by a Saudi aviation student that was being trained by the U.S. military.
  - The U.S. unemployment rate drops to 3.5%, the lowest in 50 years.
  - Kansas City, Missouri becomes the first city in the U.S. to approve free public transportation.
  - The House of Representatives approves 228–187 to restore parts of the Voting Rights Act of 1965. President Trump threatens to veto if the bill is approved by the Senate.
- December 8 – Rapper Juice WRLD aka Jarad Anthony Higgins dies from a drug overdose.
- December 9
  - The Inspector General of the Department of Justice issues a report that concludes that the FBI investigation into the 2016 Trump campaign was legally justified and conducted without political bias, but reprimands the FBI for abusing its authority regarding Foreign Intelligence Surveillance Court (FISA) warrants.
  - Sports Illustrated names soccer star Megan Rapinoe Sportsperson of the Year.
- December 10
  - Democrats in the House of Representatives announce formal charges against President Trump that accuse him of abusing power and obstructing Congress, making him the fourth U.S. president in history to face impeachment.
  - A mass shooting occurs at a kosher grocery store in Jersey City, New Jersey. The attack is officially designated domestic terrorism two days later.
- December 11
  - The World Trade Organization (WTO) is left unable to intervene in trade disputes, after the U.S. blocks the appointment of new panel members.
  - Kentucky Governor Matt Bevin controversially pardons or commutes sentences for 428 convicts, including child rapists and murderers; one commutation was for the brother of a family that raised $21,500 to pay off Bevin's campaign debt.
  - Time magazine names climate activist Greta Thunberg Person of the Year
- December 12
  - The Federal Communications Commission approves a proposal to designate 988 as the hotline phone number of the National Suicide Prevention Lifeline.
  - Federal judge Clark Waddoups rules that American Samoans are U.S. citizens and should be granted U.S. passports.
- December 13 – Construction begins on the Navy oiler USNS Harvey Milk (T-AO-206), named for LGBTQ leader Harvey Milk.
- December 15 – Hallmark Channel faces a backlash after pulling ads that show same-sex couples celebrating marriages. The backlash caused an almost immediate reversal of the plan.
- December 16
  - Boeing announces that it will suspend production of the Boeing 737 MAX—which was involved in two accidents earlier this year—in January 2020.
  - A dozen people are killed by winter storms in Kansas, Nebraska, and Missouri. 27 tornadoes hit Alabama, Mississippi, and Louisiana, killing three in northern Alabama and one in Vernon Parish, Louisiana.
- December 17
  - A former employee of the Church of Jesus Christ of Latter-day Saints alleges that the Church illegally built a $100 billion investment fund intended for charitable purposes and owes billions in taxes. The Church denies the allegations.
  - New Jersey Governor Phil Murphy signs a bill restoring voting rights to 80,000 people who are on parole or probation, joining 17 other states with similar laws. Governor Murphy later signs a law making New Jersey the fifteenth state to grant driver's licenses for illegal immigrants in the United States on December 19.
- December 18
  - The U.S. House of Representatives votes largely along party lines to forward two articles of impeachment against President Donald Trump to the Senate, accusing him of abuse of power and obstructing Congress. Donald Trump becomes the third U.S. president to be impeached by the House.
  - The Fifth Circuit Court of Appeals rules 2–1 to uphold a lower court ruling that the individual mandate in the Patient Protection and Affordable Care Act is unconstitutional.
  - The Government Accountability Office raises ethics questions about a federal contract awarded by the Department of Transportation to Boone County, Kentucky that appears to be designed to help the reelection campaign of Senate Majority Leader Mitch McConnell.
- December 19
  - For the first time in U.S. history, the economy starts and ends a decade without a recession, avoiding a recession for an entire calendar decade.
  - The House of Representatives approves the United States–Mexico–Canada Agreement (USMCA), the North American trade deal set to replace NAFTA.
  - U.S. Steel announces it will lay off 1,545 workers at its Great Lakes Works production plants near Detroit, MI.
  - Washington state legislator Matt Shea (R-Spokane Valley) is accused of domestic terrorism on three occasions, including for his participation in the 2016 Bundy-family takeover of a wildlife refuge in Oregon.
  - The sixth Democratic presidential debate is held in Los Angeles, hosted by Politico and PBS. Seven candidates participate.
  - Camille Schrier of Virginia wins the Miss America 2020 beauty pageant.
- December 20
  - The United States Space Force (USSF) is founded, becoming the sixth U.S. military service branch and the first new service branch in 72 years.
  - The federal government authorizes, for the first time, the use of federal funds to research geoengineering.
  - Star Wars: The Rise of Skywalker is released as the Ninth and last film of the Star Wars saga.
- December 21 – White Sands National Park becomes the 62nd National Park in the United States.
- December 22
  - Two days after a failed launch, the Boeing CST-100 Starliner makes a soft landing in New Mexico.
  - At least 13 people are injured during a shooting at a memorial for an earlier shooting victim in Englewood, Chicago, IL.
  - Fog and ice cause a 69-car pileup westbound on I-64 near Williamsburg, Virginia. 51 people are injured. Two died and 46 were injured when a similar accident involving 30 vehicles took place on December 18 along I-80 in White Deer Township, Pennsylvania.
- December 23
  - Business Insider reports that 9,300 retail stores will close by the end of the year, including all 2,500 of Payless ShoeSource, 805 of Gymboree, 650 of Dressbarn, and 520 of Charlotte Russe.
  - Former Congressman Dennis Kucinich endorses Tulsi Gabbard's 2020 presidential campaign.
- December 25 – Ambassador Daniel Lewis Foote is recalled from Zambia after defending gay rights and denouncing corruption.
- December 27
  - A judge temporarily blocks a North Carolina law that requires voter ID. Democratic Attorney General Josh Stein is undecided as to whether to appeal.
  - The Food and Drug Administration officially raises the legal age for tobacco products, e-cigarettes, and vaping cartridges from 18 to 21.
  - An article in The Washington Post accuses former American Cardinal Theodore Edgar McCarrick of paying bribes totaling US$600,000 to Pope John Paul II ($50,000) and Pope Benedict XVI ($291,000) and 100 Vatican employees to cover-up sexual misconduct accusations against him.
- December 28 – Police in New York City are reported to have investigated at least five and possibly eight cases of antisemitic attacks during the week. These follow shootings at a Kosher grocery store and a Jewish cemetery in Jersey City just two weeks earlier.
- December 30
  - Former president Barack Obama and incumbent president Donald Trump tie in Gallup's most admired man and woman poll. Michelle Obama is chosen as the most admired woman.
  - 91 groups with connections to public lands send a letter to Secretary of the Interior David Bernhardt demanding that acting Bureau of Land Management director William Perry Pendley resign or be removed from office.
- December 31
  - Thousands protest outside the U.S. Embassy in Baghdad, Iraq, in response to an airstrike that killed 25 on December 27.
  - Illinois Governor J. B. Pritzker pardons 11,017 low-level marijuana convictions.

== 2019 in Numbers ==
- Economics
  - Nominal GDP: $21,439.45 billion (#1), per capita: 65,112 (#8).
  - Purchasing power parity Ranking: $21,439.45 (#2), per capita: $65,112 (#11).
  - Growth rate: 2.1% (3rd quarter estimate).
  - Personal income in the United States: Increase 0.5% in November 2019, compared to +0.1% in October; Wages and salaries increase 0.4% in November, compared to 0.5% in October.
  - Current account deficit: Down $1.1 billion, or 0.9%, to $124.1 billion in the third quarter of 2019. The third quarter deficit was 2.3% of GDP.
  - Unemployment rate: Fell from 3.9% in January to 3.5% in November.
  - Federal debt: $22.6 trillion on September 30; up from $22 trillion in February.
  - Federal deficit (Fiscal 2019): $984 billion (highest since 2012.
  - Stock Market: S&P 500 close: 3,230.78; NASDAQ Composite close: 8,972.60; Dow Jones Industrial Average close: 28,534.44.
- Education
  - Programme for International Student Assessment (15-year-olds): The OECD ranks the United States #24/63 with 1489 total points; 500 in reading (average 493), 487 in math (average 496), and 502 in science (average 501).
  - Best universities: QS Top Universities ranks Massachusetts Institute of Technology, Stanford University, Harvard University, and California Institute of Technology the four best universities in the world. University of Chicago is #9.
- Immigration
  - Immigrants (2017, the year with the most recent figures): 44.4 million people, 13.6% of the total population; 77% are legally authorized and 45% are naturalized citizens.
  - Country of origin of immigrant population (2017): Mexico (25%) China (6%), India (6%), the Philippines (5%) and El Salvador (3%). Regionally: South and East Asia (27%), Europe/Canada (13%), the Caribbean (10%), Central America (8%), South America (7%), the Middle East (4%) and sub-Saharan Africa (4%).
  - Country of origin for new immigrants (2017): Total: 1,000,000; India (126,000 people), Mexico (124,000), China (121,000) and Cuba (41,000).
  - Overstayed visas vs. illegal border crossings: The Center for Migration Studies of New York estimates that 62% of the undocumented immigrants in the U.S. had overstayed their visas versus 38% who crossed the border illegally.
  - Persons detained by U.S. Immigration and Customs Enforcement (ICE) (September 10, 2019): 52,722. in 200 detention centers.
  - Deaths during ICE custody: 15 (2019); 24 (January 21, 2017 – June 9, 2019).
  - Deferred Action for Childhood Arrivals (DACA) participants: 600,000.
- Gun violence
  - Total deaths: 38,820 (children 0-11, 208), (teens 12–17, 765).
  - Homicide, murder, unintentional: 14,494.
  - Suicide: 23,826.
  - Injuries : 29,054.
  - Mass shootings: Measurements of mass shootings vary greatly. Gun Violence Archive reports 410 incidents by December 27; ABC News reports 21 incidents and 124 killed by September 30.
  - Mass murders: 30 incidents.
  - Gun safety laws passed (2019 legislative session): 23 states and DC; 70 laws.
  - Officer-involved incidents: 70 incidents; officer killed or injured: 297; suspect killed: 1,197.
- Population 330,193,593 (est, Dec 26); #3 in world. Most populous: California (39,747,267) Least populous: Wyoming (572,381).
  - Life expectancy: 78.6 years for a baby born in 2017, down from 78.7 years in 2016. Centers for Disease Control and Prevention cites a 72% increase in overdoses in the last decade (including a 30% increase in opioid overdoses from July 2016 to September 2017), a ten-year increase in liver disease (men 25 to 34 increased by 8%; women by 11%), and a 33% increase in suicide rates since 1999.

== Births ==
- January 24 – A Pudú (South American deer) in Los Angeles Zoo.
- March 16 – April the Giraffe gives birth to her fifth calf.
- July 12 – An unnamed endangered male Malayan tapir, born at Point Defiance Zoo & Aquarium in Tacoma, WA.
- November 25 – An unnamed female Southern white rhinoceros was born by artificial semination at the San Diego Zoo. A male, Edward, was born to a different mother in July. Indian rhinoceroses born through artificial insemination in 2019 include Monica (b. at Zoo Miami in May) and an unnamed male (b. at Buffalo Zoo on June 21).
- December 24 – An unnamed black rhino is born at Potter Park Zoo in Lansing, Michigan.

== See also ==
- 2019 in American music
- 2019 in American soccer
- 2019 in American television
- List of American films of 2019
- 2019 United States elections
- 2019 in politics and government
- 2019 in United States politics and government
