= 2019 in politics =

These are some of the notable events relating to politics in 2019.

== Events ==
=== January ===
- January 11 – Sultan Muhammad V of Kelantan officially abdicates his position as Yang di-Pertuan Agong (Malaysia's head of state) two years early, the first ever to do so.
- January 21 – Ireland celebrates the hundredth anniversary of the First Dáil with a joint sitting of the Dáil and Seanad at the Mansion House, Dublin.
- January 24 – Sultan Abdullah of Pahang is proclaimed Malaysia's new head of state (Yang di-Pertuan Agong), having succeeded his own father, Ahmad Shah, as Sultan of Pahang in the interim.
- January 29 – Sierra Leone prohibits female genital mutilation.

=== February ===
- February 3 – Nayib Bukele of the center-right Grand Alliance for National Unity (GANA) is elected president of El Salvador.
- February 6 – Matthieu Orphelin, a member of the French National Assembly for Maine-et-Loire, leaves the La République En Marche parliamentary group in protest against the government's ecological policy.
- February 13 – Spain's parliamentary opposition votes down the government's budget; this results in prime minister Pedro Sánchez, calling a general election.
- February 23 – Muhammadu Buhari wins reelection as president of 2019 Nigerian general election.
- February 24
  - In the 2019 Senegalese presidential election, the incumbent, Macky Sall, wins a second term in office.
  - A constitutional referendum is held in Cuba to approve a new constitution passed by the National Assembly of People's Power during 2018.
- February 27–28 2019 North Korea–United States Hanoi Summit.

=== March ===
- March 13
  - The British Parliament votes to reject the idea of leaving the EU, also known as Brexit, without first agreeing to a deal with EU.
- March 15
  - The Christchurch mosque shootings result in widespread calls for changes to New Zealand's gun laws.
- March 19 – Nursultan Nazarbayev resigns as President of Kazakhstan after 29 years in office and appoints Kassym-Jomart Tokayev as acting president. Astana is renamed Nur-Sultan the following day in his honor.
- March 20 – Europe's antitrust regulators fine Google 1.49 billion euros ($1.7 billion) for freezing out rivals in the online advertising business. The ruling brings to nearly $10 billion the fines imposed against Google by the European Union.
- March 21
  - Brazil's former president Michel Temer is arrested, along with former governor of Rio de Janeiro Moreira Franco, as the result of an investigation into corruption known as "Operation Car Wash".
- March 23
  - The Liberal-National Coalition government led by Gladys Berejiklian wins the 2019 New South Wales state election and returns to office with a reduced majority.
  - The final territory of the Islamic State of Iraq and the Levant, located in Al-Baghuz Fawqani, Syria, is liberated.
  - An estimated 400,000 people march in central London in protest against Brexit.
- March 31
  - 2019–20 Hong Kong protests: Large-scale demonstrations begin in Hong Kong as the result of the proposal of new legislation by China's government.

=== April ===
- April 2 – Abdelaziz Bouteflika resigns as President of Algeria amid widespread protests, after nearly two decades in office.
- April 11 – Kim Jae-ryong is appointed premier of North Korea at the first session of the 14th Supreme People's Assembly, replacing Pak Pong-ju, who had been in post for six years. Choe Ryong-hae is appointed president of the presidium, replacing Kim Yong-nam after 21 years.
- April 17 – 2019 Indonesian general election: Incumbent president Joko Widodo wins a second term. The result is immediately disputed by his opponent Prabowo Subianto, alleging electoral fraud.
- April 28 – A snap election called by Spain's prime minister Pedro Sánchez results in victory for the Spanish Socialist Workers' Party (PSOE). The 2019 Spanish general election is for all 350 seats in the Congress of Deputies and 208 (of the 266) seats in the Senate. The PSOE, under Pedro Sánchez, wins the most seats, but not an outright majority.

=== May ===
- 1 May
  - Naruhito becomes Emperor of Japan in succession to his father Akihito. His accession marks the beginning of the Reiwa era.
- 5 May
  - Pro-Western Stevo Pendarovski wins the second round in the 2019 North Macedonian presidential election.
- 16 May
  - Xavier Espot is sworn in Prime Minister of Andorra, succeeding Antoni Martí.
- 17 May
  - Brexit talks in United Kingdom between Labour and the Conservatives end without agreement, following six weeks of cross-party debate, with Jeremy Corbyn saying negotiations have "gone as far as they can."
- 18 May
  - 2019 Australian federal election: Scott Morrison's Liberal/National Coalition government is narrowly re-elected, defeating the Labor Party led by Bill Shorten.
  - Austria's Vice Chancellor, Heinz-Christian Strache, resigns from office over a scandal that became known as the "Ibiza affair".
- 23 May
  - 2019 Indian general election: The government of India's incumbent prime minister Narendra Modi wins a convincing victory, with the National Democratic Alliance obtaining a total of 353 seats.
- 26 May
  - Gitanas Nausėda wins the 2019 Lithuanian presidential election.
- 30 May
  - Anthony Albanese is elected unopposed as leader of the Australian Labor Party and Leader of the Opposition, replacing Bill Shorten. Richard Marles is elected deputy unopposed, succeeding Tanya Plibersek

=== June ===
- June 2 – Walter Lübcke, a politician from the Christian Democratic Union of Germany, is found dead at his home, shot in the head.
- June 9 – 2019 Kazakh presidential election: Kassym-Jomart Tokayev is elected President of Kazakhstan amidst charges of irregularities.
- June 20 – In Tbilisi, Georgia, hundreds of people are injured as police fire rubber bullets and tear gas at protesters. The protesters were attempting to storm the parliament building, in response to the action of Sergei Gavrilov, a visiting Russian politician, who gave a speech in Russian from the speaker's chair during an international Orthodox assembly.
- June 22 – Mohamed Ould Ghazouani wins the 2019 Mauritanian presidential election with 52% of the vote.

=== July ===
- July 2
  - The Ninth European Parliament had its first plenary session on July 2, 2019.
- July 24
  - Theresa May formally tenders her resignation as Prime Minister of the United Kingdom to the Queen, and is succeeded by Boris Johnson.
  - Boris Johnson subsequently begins to form his cabinet, with Sajid Javid appointed as Chancellor of the Exchequer, Priti Patel as Home Secretary, and Dominic Raab as Foreign Secretary and First Secretary of State.
- July 26
  - 103 civilians, including 26 children, have been killed in bombings by the Syrian government in Idlib and Aleppo, Syria, since July 16, 2019.
- July 31
  - The Federal Reserve cuts interest rates for the first time since 2008, with a 0.25% reduction to a baseline level of 2-2.25%.

=== August ===
- August 1
  - Danish polar research institution Polar Portal reports a large spike in Greenland ice loss, with 11 billion tons melted in one day and 197 gigatonnes during the month of July.
  - The United Kingdom government announces an extra £2.1bn of funding to prepare for a no-deal Brexit, doubling the amount of money it has set aside for 2019, and taking the total since June 2016 to £6.3bn.
  - Liberal Democrat MP Jane Dodds wins the 2019 Brecon and Radnorshire by-election, beating the incumbent Conservative Chris Davies, and leaving the Tories in the UK House of Commons with a working majority of just one.
- August 2
  - The United States officially withdraws from the Intermediate-Range Nuclear Forces Treaty established with Russia in 1987.
  - 2019–2020 Japan–South Korea trade dispute: Japan announces the removal of South Korea from its list of most trusted trading partners, effective on August 28.
- August 5
  - Revocation of the special status of Jammu and Kashmir: India revokes the part of its constitution that gives Indian-administered Kashmir special status in an unprecedented move.
  - 2019–20 Hong Kong protests: Amid ongoing protests, Hong Kong is hit by the first general strikes of their kind since 1967.
- August 7
  - The Singapore Convention on Mediation, also known as the UN Convention on International Settlement Agreements Resulting from Mediation, comes into effect with 46 countries ratifying it. States that have ratified the treaty will have to ensure that international commercial settlement agreements are enforced by their courts.
- August 9
  - Data shows that the UK economy shrank by 0.2% in the second quarter of 2019, its first contraction since 2012, according to the Office for National Statistics.
  - A major power blackout hits parts of England and Wales, affecting nearly a million people and causing widespread travel disruption.
  - The deputy prime minister of Italy and leader of the League, Matteo Salvini, called for new elections, and announced a no-confidence vote on the government backed by his party in a coalition with the Five Star Movement.
- August 10
  - Richard Braine is elected as leader of the UK Independence Party, succeeding Gerard Batten.
- August 11
  - NYSE drops more than 1%, due to concerns about possible trade war.
  - Argentina's president Mauricio Macri loses a primary vote by a landslide, suggesting possible defeat in October's presidential election. Widespread public discontent is attributed to the country's economic situation, i.e. recession, austerity and inflation at more than 50%.
  - Alejandro Giammattei wins the second round of the 2019 Guatemalan presidential election.
- August 12
  - Trump Administration announces it will delay its proposal for 10 percent tariffs slated to take effect Sep 1 on certain consumer goods from China while exempting other products — less than two weeks after Trump announced the new proposed tariffs.
  - 2019–2020 Japan–South Korea trade dispute: South Korea announces the removal of Japan from its list of most trusted trading partners, effective on September 18.
- August 14
  - Main yield curve for US Treasury bonds inverts, as the yield rate for 2-year bonds rises higher than the yield rate for 10-year bonds.
  - Dow Jones plunges more than 500 points, due to concerns over the yield curve inversion.
  - Germany's economy is announced to have contracted in 2nd quarter, April to June 2019.
- August 15
  - European Central Bank shuts down PNB Banka after ruling it had become insolvent; this bank was previously called Norvik Banka and was Latvia's sixth-largest lender, and was a critic of the Baltic country's financial authorities.
- August 21
  - 2019 Brazil wildfires: Brazil's National Institute for Space Research (INPE) reports fires burning in the Amazon rainforest at a record rate, with more than 36,000 in the year to date, while smoke reaches São Paulo more than 1,700 miles (2,700 km) away.
  - Italian prime minister Giuseppe Conte resigns.
- August 22 – US manufacturer growth slows, according to US manufacturing purchasing managers' index.
- August 24 –
  - The 45th G7 summit was held on August 24–26, 2019, in Biarritz, Nouvelle-Aquitaine, France. In March 2014, the G7 declared that a meaningful discussion was currently not possible with Russia in the context of the G8. Since then, meetings have continued within the G7 process. However, according to a senior administration official, Donald Trump and Emmanuel Macron had agreed that Russia should be invited to the next G7 Summit to be held in 2020. Five points were agreed at the issue of the summit, about:
    - the World Trade Organization, "with regard to intellectual property protection, to settle disputes more swiftly and to eliminate unfair trade practices"
    - the "G7 commits to reaching an agreement in 2020 to simplify regulatory barriers and modernize international taxation within the framework of the OECD"
    - the G7 shares objectives on Iran: "to ensure that Iran never acquires nuclear weapons and to foster peace and stability in the region."
    - on Libya: "We support a truce in Libya that will lead to a long-term ceasefire. We believe that only a political solution can ensure Libya's stability. We call for a well-prepared international conference to bring together all the stakeholders and regional actors relevant to this conflict. We support in this regard the work of the United Nations and the African Union to set up an inter-Libyan conference."
    - in an opaque reference to the Russian military intervention in Ukraine (2014–present), "France and Germany will organize a Normandy format summit in the coming weeks to achieve tangible results."
    - in light of the 2019–20 Hong Kong protests, "The G7 reaffirms the existence and the importance of the 1984 Sino-British agreement on Hong Kong and calls for avoiding violence."

=== September ===
- September 2 – In a speech outside 10 Downing Street, Boris Johnson states his opposition to calling a general election, and urges MPs not to vote for "another pointless delay" to Brexit.
- September 3
  - Pound sterling falls below $1.20, its lowest level since October 2016, before recovering the day's losses.
  - The Conservative Party government of the UK loses its majority in the House of Commons after Conservative MP Phillip Lee crosses the floor to join the Liberal Democrats.
  - Boris Johnson loses a key Brexit vote, as MPs opposed to no deal take control of House of Commons business, by a majority of 328 to 301. Johnson responds by telling MPs he will now push for an October general election.
- September 4
  - Italy's incoming prime minister Giuseppe Conte to present a new government of the anti-establishment Five Star Movement and former centre-left foes after nearly a month of crisis.
  - A bill intended to block the possibility of the UK leaving the EU without a deal passes its first Commons vote by 329 to 300.
  - UK MPs reject Boris Johnson's motion to call a snap general election for October, failing to achieve the two-thirds Commons majority needed under the Fixed-term Parliaments Act, in a vote of 298 to 56. Labour MPs abstain from the vote.
- September 6
  - The bill designed to prevent a no deal Brexit is passed by the UK House of Lords.
  - Opposition parties in the UK agree not to back any further government calls for a general election in mid-October.
  - The UK High Court rejects a case brought by anti-Brexit campaigner Gina Miller over the suspension of parliament, ruling that it is lawful.
- September 8
  - Raul Khajimba wins the 2019 Abkhazian presidential election.
- September 9
  - John Bercow announces that he will stand down as Speaker of the House of Commons on October 31, or at the next general election, depending on which comes first.
  - The Benn bill, intended to stop Britain leaving the EU without a deal, is granted royal assent.
- September 10 – The UK Parliament is suspended amid unprecedented protests from opposition MPs, who hold up signs in the House of Commons and refuse to back the suspension.
- September 16
  - Top Democrats says they are waiting for President Trump to state what gun-control legislation he might be willing to approve.
- September 17
  - Israel holds legislative elections for the second time in 2019, after the 21st Knesset voted to dissolve itself due to Benjamin Netanyahu's failure to cobble a parliamentary coalition.
- September 20
  - September 2019 climate strikes take place as series of international strikes and protests to demand action be taken to address climate change, centered around September 20, which is three days before the United Nations Climate Summit, and September 27. The protests are taking place across 4,500 locations in 150 countries. The event is a part of the school strike for climate movement, inspired by Swedish climate activist Greta Thunberg. On September 20, organisers reported that 1.4 million people took part in the German strikes, and an estimated 300,000 protesters took part in Australian strikes. A rally in London drew 100,000 participants, according to organisers.
- September 24
  - The 11 justices of the Supreme Court of the United Kingdom rule unanimously that the prorogation brought forward by Boris Johnson is both justiciable and unlawful, and therefore null and of no effect.
  - United Nations General Debate of the 74th session. The annual General Debate of the United Nations General Assembly is the occasion for world leaders to gather at UN Headquarters to discuss global issues.
- September 25
  - Speaker John Bercow of UK House of Commons opens the first sitting of Parliament with a statement from the chair: he welcomed MPs back to work and informed the House that consequent to the Supreme Court ruling, the Hansard record of the prorogation ceremony would be expunged and corrected to reflect the House as adjourned instead, and that the Royal Assent that had been signified to the Parliamentary Buildings (Restoration and Renewal Act) during the ceremony would be re-signified. UK Attorney-General Cox defended the advice he gave to Johnson as being "in good faith", and distanced himself from comments from Conservative MPs which attacked the independence of the judiciary; specifically, Rees-Mogg's description of the ruling as a "constitutional coup".
- September 28
  - 2019 Afghan presidential election, for the next President. This was first rescheduled from April 20, then from July 20, to improve polling.

=== October ===
- October 1
  - The 2019 Peruvian constitutional crisis began when President Martín Vizcarra dissolved the Congress of Peru on September 30, 2019. Congress responded by declaring Vizcarra's presidency suspended and appointed Vice President Mercedes Aráoz as interim president, moves that were largely seen as null and void. The next day, on October 1, 2019, interim president Aráoz announced her resignation while Vizcarra issued a decree for legislative snap elections to be held on January 26, 2020.
  - The first cannabis cafe in the United States opens in Los Angeles, California.
  - The Florida Department of Education announces that some teachers in some districts will be allowed to carry guns in schools.
  - The UK Office for National Statistics reports that 726 homeless people died in England and Wales in 2018, a 22% rise from 2017 and the highest increase since records began.
  - Torrential rain brings flooding to many parts of Great Britain with dozens of warnings issued by the Environment Agency. Some areas in the Midlands, Wales and southern England are hit by a week's rain in just one hour.
- October 2
  - Gabby Giffords and March for Our Lives host a forum on gun safety for 2020 presidential candidates in Las Vegas. Nine candidates laid out plans for stronger gun control. Senator Bernie Sanders could not attend because he is recovering from an operation.
  - U.S. Senate Democrats ask the IRS to revoke the tax-exempt status of the National Rifle Association of America.
  - California becomes the second state, after North Dakota, to allow the establishment of public banks as an alternative to commercial banks. The idea is to provide low-interest loans for businesses, affordable housing, and municipal infrastructure.
  - Ten anti-drone protesters are arrested at Creech Air Force Base in Nevada.
  - UK prime minister Johnson publishes his Brexit plan, which includes proposals to replace the Irish backstop. It would create an "all-island regulatory zone", meaning that Northern Ireland essentially stays in the European Single Market for agricultural and industrial goods.
  - The government announces fresh plans to prorogue parliament, from October 8–14 to allow them to bring the current parliamentary session to an end and introduce a new Queen's Speech.
- October 3
  - Finland agrees to return Native American remains and other artifacts stolen in 1891 to Mesa Verde National Park in Colorado.
  - CNN refuses to run an ad for the Donald Trump 2020 presidential campaign, saying it includes false claims against former vice president Joe Biden. Fox News rejects a request from the Joe Biden 2020 presidential campaign to not run the ad either.
  - President Trump calls on Ukraine and China to investigate former vice president Joe Biden and his son Hunter Biden.
  - The Washington Post reports an Internal Revenue Service employee filed a whistleblower complaint reporting that an unnamed political appointee at the United States Department of the Treasury tried to interfere with the tax audits for President Trump or Vice President Mike Pence.
  - European Commission spokesperson Daniel Rosario threatens retaliatory measures if the United States imposes a US$7.5 billion (€6.823 billion) tariff on products such as olives, whiskey, wine, cheese, yogurt, and airplanes. The tariffs are scheduled to take place on October 18.
- October 4
  - Microsoft says a group called Phosphorus, which is linked to the Iranian government, has attempted to hack accounts belonging to American journalists, former government officials, and a 2020 United States presidential election, as well as prominent Iranians living outside Iran.
  - The Bureau of Land Management ends a five-year moratorium on leasing federal land in California to fossil fuel companies, opening 725,000 acres (1100 sq. miles; 29,000 ha) to drilling in San Benito, Monterey, and Fresno counties.
  - Defense Secretary Mark Esper says the United States has picked up its attacks in Afghanistan since peace talks with the Taliban fell apart last month. In August, Politico reported that the U.S. troop strength is about 13,000, fewer than the authorized 14,000.
  - The UK government assures the highest civil court in Scotland that Boris Johnson will send a letter to the EU seeking an extension to Article 50 as required by the Benn Act.
- October 6 – 2019 Portuguese legislative election, for all 230 seats to the Assembly of the Republic. Socialist Party of Prime Minister António Costa scored a comfortable victory but failed to secure an absolute majority.
- October 7
  - 90 people are arrested in Manhattan, New York City, in a climate change protest organized by Extinction Rebellion.
  - Bloomberg News reports that Zimbabwe accuses the U.S. of lying about forced labor at a state-owned diamond mine.
- October 8
  - In Azerbaijan a protest in Baku is held for the freedom of assembly. It was followed by protests on October 19 and 20.
  - A Downing Street source says that a Brexit deal is now "essentially impossible" after a phone call between the prime minister and German chancellor Angela Merkel. The Brexit spokesman for Angela Merkel's CDU parliamentary group says the unattributable remark "does not ring true".
  - Parliament is prorogued until October 14.
  - About 200 Extinction Rebellion activists block the gates of Leinster House (parliament) in the Republic of Ireland.
  - The Donald Trump re-election campaign owes 10 cities $840,000 for security assistance.
- October 9
  - The UK Government announces plans for a special Saturday sitting of Parliament for October 19 to discuss Brexit options.
  - Welsh Assembly AMs vote 43–13 to rename the legislature with a bilingual name, calling it both Senedd Cymru and the Welsh Parliament.
- October 10 – Boris Johnson and his Irish counterpart, Taoiseach Leo Varadkar hold talks at Thornton Manor in north west England aimed at reaching an agreement over Northern Ireland's status after Brexit.
- October 11
  - Abiy Ahmed, Prime Minister of Ethiopia is awarded the 2019 Nobel Peace Prize for his work in ending the Eritrean–Ethiopian War.
  - President Trump's 4th U.S. Homeland Security Advisor, Kevin McAleenan, resigns.
- October 13
  - Kais Saied wins the second round of the 2019 Tunisian presidential election with 72.7% of the vote.
  - Ecuadorian president Lenín Moreno signs an agreement to restore fuel subsidies, ending a protest that began on October 2, leaving seven dead and 2,100 people arrested while the government was forced to move from Quito to Guayaquil.
  - The Law and Justice Party (PiS) wins the 2019 Polish parliamentary election.
- October 14 – 700 scientists endorse massive civil disobedience as a way to protest climate change. In London, Extinction Rebellion protesters block the financial district and 1,200 are arrested.
- October 17 – Acting White House Chief of Staff Mick Mulvaney announces the 46th G7 summit will be held at Trump National Doral in Miami. On October 20 President Trump announced it will no longer be held at Doral.
- October 18
  - Chilean President Sebastián Piñera announces a state of emergency after a hike in subway fares sparks mass protests and vandalism by high school students.
  - Cities in Lebanon undergo a second day of massive protests against corruption and dysfunction. The protests, sparked by an announcement of new taxes on Internet messaging services such as WhatsApp, Facebook Messenger, and FaceTime. The protests have been largely peaceful, although two store workers were killed on October 17 when a politician's bodyguard opened fire on protesters.
  - 525,000 protesters paralyze Barcelona's transportation system in support of the Catalan independence movement. About half of government employees stayed away from work, as some major labor unions refused to join a general strike based on political ideology rather than justifiable economic complaints relating to labor conditions.
- October 19 – Up to 1,000,000 march in London in support of a delay in the vote on the Brexit withdrawal agreement.
- October 20
  - 7,000 supporters of Honduran President Juan Orlando Hernández march in Tegucigalpa after his younger brother, Juan Antonio "Tony" Hernández was found guilty of drug trafficking in New York.
  - As protests against transportation rate hikes in Chile extend to five different cities, eight people are burned to death and two are shot; a curfew is ordered for the second day in a row.
  - 2019 Swiss federal election: The two green parties, the Green Party of Switzerland and the Green Liberal Party of Switzerland, made major electoral gains, taking 13.2% and 7.8% of the vote respectively. As in the previous election, the Swiss People's Party received the most votes, but its share of votes went down to 25.6% from the 29.4%.
  - Thousands protest against the president and insist he must step down in Haiti.
  - 2019 Bolivian general election: Evo Morales defeated his nearest rival by 10%, but after multiple allegations of irregularities, the Organization of American States said it had found "clear manipulations" of Bolivia's voting system, Morales called for a new election.
- October 21
  - Thousands take to the streets of Sudan to demand the dismantling of former president Omar al-Bashir's National Congress Party.
  - 2019 Canadian federal election, for all 338 seats in the House of Commons of Canada. The ruling Liberal Party of Canada wins a plurality of votes, and Prime Minister Justin Trudeau will lead a minority government.
- October 22
  - Russian president Vladimir Putin and Turkish president Recep Tayyip Erdogan hold talks in Sochi, Krasnodar Krai, Russia to discuss "normalizing" the situation in Syria. They agree to a 32-kilometer "safe zone" for the Kurds along the Syria-Turkey border and territorial integrity for both countries.
  - September 2019 Israeli legislative election: Former prime minister Binyamin Netanyahu announces he cannot form a majority coalition.
- October 23 – A court in Tanzania overturns a law that allows child marriage at 15.
- October 25 – Crowds estimated between 1,200,000 and 2,000,000 march peacefully in Plaza Italia, Santiago, Chile, protesting against President Sebastián Piñera and demanding his resignation.
- October 27 – Alberto Fernandez is elected President of Argentina in the first round.
- October 28 – Claudia López Hernández becomes the first woman and the first lesbian elected mayor of Bogotá, Colombia.
- October 29
  - After two weeks of protests, Lebanese Prime Minister Saad Hariri announces will resign.
  - The United States House of Representatives votes 405–11 in favor of a resolution condemning the Armenian genocide.
  - 18 killed and 800 injured as masked men open fire on protesters in Karbala, Iraq.
- October 30
  - The last Prime Minister's Question Time before the general election is held.
  - The Pentagon claims that North Korea has fired two missiles. Earlier this month they fired an underwater ballistic missile.
  - Colombia President Iván Duque Márquez sends 2,500 troops to the Cauca Department after five indigenous leaders, including Cristina Bautista, chief of the semi-autonomous indigenous reservation of Nasa Tacueyó. President Duque Márquez blames dissident members of FARC, but no arrests have been made.

=== November ===
- November 1
  - Jordan recalls its ambassador to Israel after the latter country refuses to release two of its citizens held without charge since August.
  - Duma Boko, who led Botswana's coalition Umbrella for Democratic Change in the October 2019 elections, charges there were "massive electoral discrepancies" and wants to challenge the election in court. Official results show the ruling Botswana Democratic Party (BDP) winning 38 of 57 constituencies.
  - Greece pushes for new, tough laws for people who are seeking asylum that may be in violation of international law.
- November 2
  - Turkey threatens to send captured ISIS fighters back to Europe.
  - El Salvador and Venezuela expel one another's diplomats after Salvadoran President Nayib Bukele recognized Juan Guaidó as the president of Venezuela.
- November 4
  - 18 female members of Parliament of the United Kingdom say they will not seek reelection due to threats and abuse.
- November 5
  - After the killing of 3 women and 6 children, including American citizens, in the northern Mexican state of Sonora, U.S. president Donald Trump offers to send troops to Mexico. President Andrés Manuel López Obrador turns down the offer.
  - Protests in Pakistan reach their fifth day.
- November 5 – 2019 United States elections
  - 2019 Kentucky gubernatorial election: Democrat Andy Beshear defeats one-term Republican Matt Bevin.
  - 2019 Mississippi gubernatorial election: Republican Lt. Governor Tate Reeves defeats Democratic Attorney General Jim Hood.
  - 2019 Virginia Senate election & 2019 Virginia House of Delegates election: Democrats take control of the legislature for the first time in twenty years.
- November 7 – New Zealand passes a law to achieve zero carbon emissions by 2050.
- November 9
  - Bolivian President Evo Morales says there was an attempted coup d'etat against his government.
  - Heavy fighting is reported on the Syria–Turkey border, with four Syrian soldiers reported killed. Last week, Turkish forces captured 18 Syrian government soldiers in the area and set them free hours later following mediation by Russia.
- November 10
  - Two Ugandans killed in Rwanda, heating up border tensions.
  - Evo Morales resigns as President of Bolivia.
  - 2019 Romanian presidential election: A second round will be held on November 24, 2019.
  - November 2019 Spanish general election
- November 11 – Tensions rise in the 2019–20 Hong Kong protests as police kill one protester and 60 others are injured, including a counter-protester who was doused with gasoline and set on fire.
- November 12 – Venice Mayor Luigi Brugnaro declares that historic flooding of his city is a result of the climate crisis.
- Large crowds of Indigenous people march in La Paz to protest the golpe de estado against Evo Morales.
- November 13
  - 20 dead in an apparent jihadist attack in Peh, Mali.
- November 14 – The results of the 2019 Afghan presidential election to be made public.
- November 16
  - Presidential election in Sri Lanka.
  - Pope Francis decries the rise of fascist forces, corporate crimes, and ecological degradation in a speech before the "20th World Congress of the International Association of Penal Law." In October, he gave a shout-out to Greta Thunberg and thanked journalists for doing their jobs, rather than calling them enemies of the people.
  - The New York Times reports that leaked documents show over 1,000,000 Muslims have been imprisoned in Xinjiang Uygur Autonomous Region over the last three years.
  - 250,000 demonstrators march in Prague, Czech Republic, one day before the 30th anniversary of the Velvet Revolution, to protest against Prime Minister Andrej Babis, who has been shown to have collaborated with the StB, the Communist-era secret police.
  - 2019 Louisiana gubernatorial election (The United States): Incumbent Democrat John Bel Edwards wins reelection with 51.3% of the vote.
  - Iran almost completely shuts down the Internet as fuel protests spread.
- November 18 – U.S. secretary of state Mike Pompeo announces a reversal of American policy, declaring that Israeli settlement in the West Bank are not illegal.
- November 21 – Israeli prime minister Benjamin Netanyahu is indicted on charges of bribery, fraud and breach of trust.
- November 24 – Pro-democracy groups make big gains in local Hong Kong elections.
  - 2019 Guinea-Bissau presidential election
  - 2019 Uruguayan presidential election (2nd round)
  - 2019 Romanian presidential election (2nd round).
- November 27
  - Farmers drive 1,000 tractors into Paris to protest French agricultural policies.
  - 2019 Namibian general election
- November 28 – Pro-democracy groups in Hong Kong celebrate two new laws signed by U.S. president Donald Trump.

=== December ===
- December 1
  - Brazil President Jair Bolsonaro blames actor and environmentalists Leonardo DiCaprio for the 2019 Amazon rainforest wildfires, alleging NGOs set the fires in return for donations. DiCaprio, Global Wildlife Conservation, and IUCN Species Survival Commission condemn Bolsonaro's accusations.
  - Maltese Prime Minister Joseph Muscat announces his resignation as prime minister, pending a leadership election within the Partit Laburista, following the resignation of his chief of staff Keith Schembri and Minister for Tourism Konrad Mizzi, as well as the self-suspension of Economy Minister Chris Cardona over political links to the murder of investigative journalist Daphne Caruana Galizia, largely incited by the 2019-2020 Maltese protests.
- December 3 – The 70th NATO summit opens in Watford, Hertfordshire, England, among controversies involving the Turkish offensive into northeastern Syria, trade, and financing.
- December 8 – Finnish Prime Minister Sanna Marin, 34, forms a coalition government composed of five parties all led by women. She is also the world's youngest sitting prime minister.
- December 10 – Democrats in the House of Representatives announce formal charges against President Donald Trump that accuse him of abusing power and obstructing Congress, making him only the fourth U.S. president in history to face impeachment.
- December 11 – The World Trade Organization (WTO) is left unable to intervene in trade disputes after the U.S. blocks the appointment of new panel members.
- December 12
  - The 2019 United Kingdom general election takes place, for all 650 seats in the House of Commons. Conservatives win 365 seats.
  - 2019 Algerian presidential election
- December 15 – A referendum on the Mayan Train held in the Mexican states of Chiapas, Tabasco, Campeche, Yucatán, and Quintana Roo is approved by 92.3% (93,142) of the voters who participated.
- December 17 – Opposition and protests across India against to the "Citizenship Amendment Act."
- December 18 – The U.S. House of Representatives approves two articles of impeachment against President Trump, making him the third president to be impeached in the nation's history.
- December 20
  - Thousands demonstrate in Minsk, Belarus, fearful that talks between President Alexander Lukashenko and Russian president Vladimir Putin will lead not only to closer economic ties between the two nations but also a political takeover a la Crimea.
  - France kills 33 presumed jihadists in Mali, a month after a helicopter crash killed 13 French soldiers.
  - Manuel Marrero Cruz is named the first Prime Minister of Cuba since 1976.
- December 21
  - The New Zealand government says it has collected over 51,000 guns from 33,000 owners at a cost of NZD $100 million (US$66 million) since the implementation of a gun-buyback program that began in March and ended on December 19. A spokesperson for the pro-gun Council of Licensed Firearms Owners says that two-thirds of the banned guns are still in private hands.
  - Satellite photos show that North Korea is working on long-range missiles.
- December 23
  - Saudi Arabia executes five officials and sentences three others to prison for the death of The Washington Post journalist Jamal Khashoggi.
  - Reuters reports that 1,500 people, including 400 women and 17 teenagers, have been killed in protests in Iran over the last month.
- December 24
  - The government of Sudan and the 'Center Track' faction of the Sudan Revolutionary Front sign a peace agreement. The Sudan Liberation Movement/Army has rejected the agreement.
  - Thirty-five civilians, seven security forces, and 80 jihadists are killed during an attack on Arbinda, Burkina Faso.
- December 26 – Iraq President Barham Salih resigns instead of appointing the unpopular Asaad Al Eidani prime minister.
- December 25 – Mexico asks the International Court of Justice to protect its diplomatic mission in La Paz, Bolivia from police harassment.
- December 28
  - A truck bomb attributed to al-Shabab kills at least 78 and wounds 125 in Mogadishu, Somalia.
  - Thousands march in Paris, France, against pension reform on the 24th day of strikes.
  - Algerian President Abdelmadjid Tebboune names Abdelaziz Djerad as prime minister.
- December 29 – Polish prime minister Mateusz Morawiecki accuses Russian president Vladimir Putin of "deliberate lies" about Poland's involvement in the outbreak of World War II. Putin called a recent European Parliament resolution on the Nazi-Soviet Pact "sheer nonsense".
- December 31
  - Former Bosnian-Serb general Milomir Savcic, 60, is indicted on charges of genocide near Srebrenica, Bosnia and Herzegovina, in July 1995. It is not known if he is in custody
  - Iraqi militiamen and protesters breach the front gate checkpoint of the United States embassy in Baghdad following a U.S. military operation that targeted an Iraqi militia on December 29.

== History by region or by world issue ==
Note: This section is provided for issue-based overviews in narrative format, if desired.

=== Climate change ===
In December 2019, the World Meteorological Organization released its annual climate report revealing that climate impacts are worsening. They found the global sea temperatures are rising as well as land temperatures worldwide. 2019 is the last year in a decade that is the warmest on record.

Global carbon emissions hit a record high in 2019, even though the rate of increase slowed somewhat, according to a report from Global Carbon Project.

=== Banking and finance ===
In the first half of 2019, global debt levels reached a record high of $250 trillion, led by the US and China. The IMF warned about corporate debt. The European Central Bank raised concerns as well.

==== EU banking ====
Concerns increased about due to the euro area crisis, as both Greece and Italy had high levels of public debt. This caused concerned about stability of the Euro. In December 2019, the EU announced that banking ministers from EU member nations had failed to reach agreement over proposed banking reforms and systemic change. The EU was concerned about high rates of debt in France, Italy and Spain. Italy objected to proposed new debt bailout rules that were proposed to be added to the European Stability Mechanism.

=== Foreign policy ===
==== Yemen conflict ====
In April 2019, Trump vetoed a bipartisan bill which would have ended US support for the Saudi-led military intervention. With 53 votes instead of the 67 needed, the United States Senate failed to override the veto. The legal arguments and policies of the Obama administration were cited as justification for the veto. The US Deputy Assistant Secretary of Defense Michael Mulroy stated that US support was limited to side-by-side coaching to mitigate civilian casualties and if the measure had passed it would do nothing to help the people of Yemen and may only increase civilian deaths. Mulroy supported the United Nations' peace talks and he pushed the international community to come together and chart a comprehensive way ahead for Yemen. Writing in The Nation, Mohamad Bazzi argued that Mulroy's defence of US support as necessary to limit civilian casualties was false, and that "Saudi leaders and their allies have ignored American entreaties to minimize civilian casualties since the war's early days".

=== World trade ===
==== US-China Trade Dispute ====
A trade dispute between the US and China caused economic concerns worldwide. In December 2019, various US officials said a trade deal was likely before a proposed round of new tariffs took effect on December 15, 2019. US tariffs had a negative effect on China's economy, which slowed to growth of 6%.

==== United States–Mexico–Canada Agreement ====
The United States–Mexico–Canada Agreement is a signed but not ratified free trade agreement between Canada, Mexico, and the United States. The Agreement is the result of a 2017–2018 renegotiation of the North American Free Trade Agreement (NAFTA) by its member states. Negotiations "focused largely on auto exports, steel and aluminum tariffs, and the dairy, egg, and poultry markets." One provision "prevents any party from passing laws that restrict the cross-border flow of data". Compared to NAFTA, USMCA increases environmental and labour regulations, and incentivizes more domestic production of cars and trucks. The agreement also provides updated intellectual property protections, gives the United States more access to Canada's dairy market, imposes a quota for Canadian and Mexican automotive production, and increases the duty free limit for Canadians who buy U.S. goods online from $20 to $150.

== See also ==
- 2010s political history
- 2019 in United States politics and government

=== Overviews ===
- 2019
- List of elections in 2019
- 2019 national electoral calendar

WikiProject—Wikiproject Politics

=== Countries ===
- 2019 in Australia
- 2019 in Mexico
- 2019 in the United Kingdom
  - 2019 in England
- 2019 in the United States
  - 2019 United States elections

=== Specific events and situations ===
- 2019 Venezuelan presidential crisis
- Brexit
- 2019 Prorogation of United Kingdom Parliament
- 2019 Italian government crisis
  - Conte II Cabinet
