= Edinburg WPA Auditorium =

- U.S. National Register of Historic Places
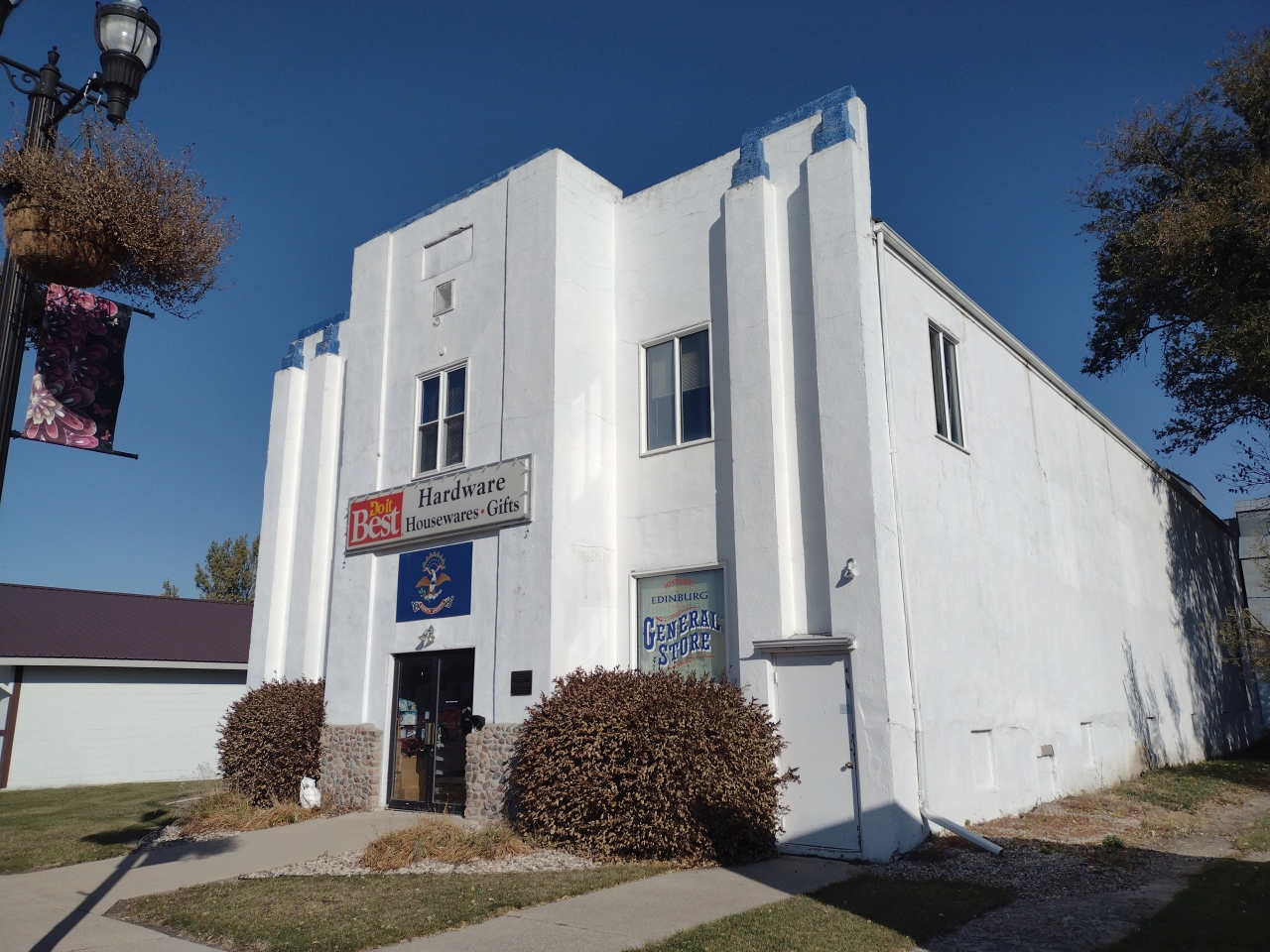

- Location within North Dakota Location within the United States
- Location: 67 Main St. Edinburg, North Dakota
- Coordinates: 48°29′45″N 97°51′51″W
- Area: less than one acre
- Built: 1938
- Architect: Theodore B. Wells
- Architectural style: Art Deco
- NRHP reference No.: 13000863
- Added to NRHP: November 7, 2013

The Edinburg WPA Auditorium is a historic auditorium building at 67 Main Street in Edinburg, North Dakota. The Art Deco structure was built in 1938 as part of the Works Progress Administration jobs program. It is a wood-frame building two stories high, sheathed in boards to which a stucco finish has been applied. There is a central projecting section on the front facade. The upper level is a large open space which was usable for a variety of social and recreational activities, and features a well-preserved sprung wooden basketball surface, decorated with the names and logos of area high school basketball teams. The lower level was originally a utility space. The upper part of the building was originally accessed via external stairs, but these were removed in 1990, and the building's entrance was reconfigured to have split-level stairs providing access to both upper and lower levels.

The building was used as a local social center through the middle decades of the 20th century, with rollerskating being a popular pastime, and is now occupied by a hardware store. It was listed on the National Register of Historic Places in 2013.
