= State Bank of Edinburg =

- U.S. National Register of Historic Places
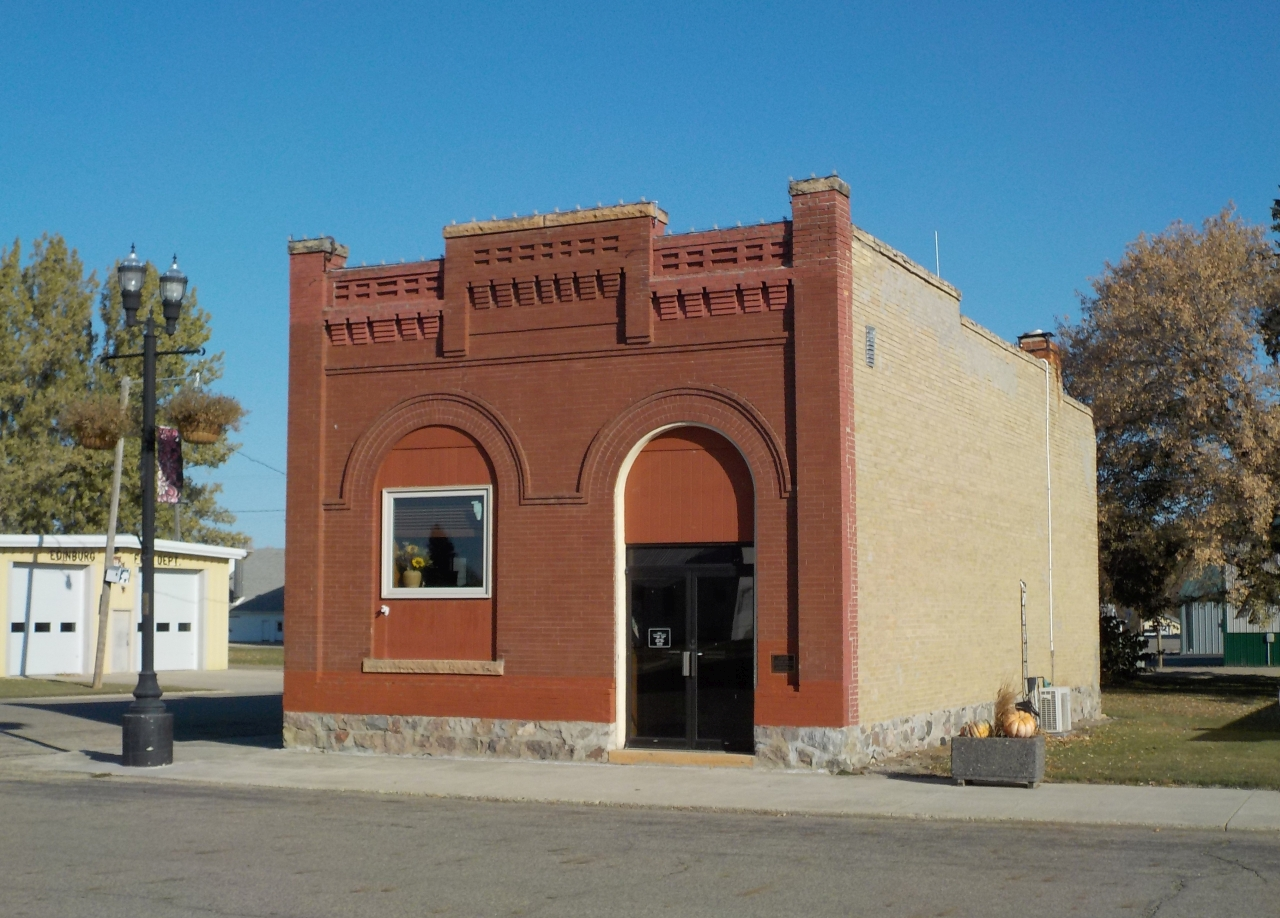

- Location within North Dakota Location within the United States
- Location: 300 Main Ave. Edinburg, North Dakota
- Coordinates: 48°29′45″N 97°51′50″W
- Area: less than one acre
- Built: 1900
- Architectural style: Romanesque
- NRHP reference No.: 01000588
- Added to NRHP: May 30, 2001

The State Bank of Edinburg on Main Ave. in Edinburg, North Dakota was built in 1900. It has also been known as Citizens State Bank. It was listed on the National Register of Historic Places (NRHP) in 2001. According to the building's NRHP nomination form, it is the last remaining banking house from the early 1900s and an example of the banks that played an important role in the area's small towns.
