= Murder of Alexandria Kostial =

2019 murder in Mississippi, US

- Location: Mississippi, U.S.
- Date: July 2019
- Deaths: 1
- Victims: Alexandria Kostial, aged 21
- Perpetrator: Brandon Theesfeld
- Charges: First-degree murder
- Sentence: Life imprisonment

Alexandria Kostial was a 21-year-old University of Mississippi (Ole Miss) student who was found dead near a Mississippi lake in July 2019. A fellow Ole Miss student, 22-year-old Brandon Theesfeld of Fort Worth, Texas, was arrested and charged with murder after Kostial's remains were discovered by a Lafayette County deputy. It was reported that Kostial had been shot multiple times.

Ole Miss student Rex Ravita, a former dorm neighbor of suspect Brandon Theesfeld, later described the suspected killer as misogynistic and arrogant, saying "I'm not going to sugar coat it, he was pretty much a daddy's boy type. Constantly had to reference his father's money, how his dad could get him out of anything, just that attitude all the time. Any type of vulgar comment he could say, any type of rude comment to anybody in our dorm, any of the women."

Ravita lived in the same dormitory as Theesfeld for a year and claimed Theesfeld and Kostial dated on and off again for about a year before her death.

The funeral for Alexandria Kostial was held in a suburb of St. Louis in July 2019.

Theesfeld occasionally dated Kostial, and reportedly thought Kostial might have been pregnant after she sent him a message about an inconclusive pregnancy test; he messaged her that he was not ready to become a parent. He kept avoiding her or cancelling plans at the last minute; eventually, they only communicated electronically. Theesfeld pled guilty to first degree murder and so was spared a capital murder charge and a possible death sentence; he was sentenced by Judge Kelly Luther to life in prison, but he will be eligible for conditional release when he turns 65.
