= 2019 in United States politics and government =

== Events ==
=== January ===
- January 3 – 116th United States Congress begins with Democratic Party taking over the House of Representatives, while the Republican party retaining its majority during the last two years of Trump's first presidency. Former Speaker and House Minority Leader Nancy Pelosi (D-CA) was elected speaker again for the second time.
- January 25 – The 2018–2019 United States federal government shutdown ends after 35 days with Democrats taking over the House.

=== September ===
- September 27 – A report from The Washington Post demonstrated that hackers can easily get into voting machines designed for use in the 2020 elections.

=== November ===
- November 26
  - Members of the Senate Committee on Commerce announced sweeping new proposals for federal laws to protect online privacy.
  - The US government imposed strict controls on US companies as to their ability to do business with Huawei, thus disrupting sales of Huawei phones overseas.

=== December ===
- December 4
  - In December 2019, Republican members of the House Education and Labor Committee said they were seeking to offer a new solution to surprise medical billing that would be more provider-friendly.
- December 5
  - Huawei submitted a petition in the US Court of Appeals for the Fifth Circuit against the FCC's decision to prohibit rural U.S. network providers from using equipment from the China-based vendor due to national security concerns, asking that the recent FCC order be overturned.
- December 6
  - The U.S. unemployment rate dropped to 3.5%, the lowest in 50 years.
  - Kansas City, Missouri became the first city in the U.S. to approve free public transportation.
  - The House of Representatives voted 228–187 to restore parts of the Voting Rights Act of 1965. President Trump threatened to veto if the bill is approved by the Senate.
- December 16
  - New deal announced regarding US-China trade dispute.
- December 17
  - Congress was ready to enact major spending bill, which Trump expects to sign. this is needed to avert government shutdown.
- December 30 – President Trump signed the Debbie Smith Reauthorization Act to help eliminate the number of rape kits needing testing that are currently stalled in backlog.
- December 31 – Hundreds of protesters threw stones and set fires at the U.S. Embassy in Baghdad, Iraq in response to a December 27 bombing of Iranian-backed militias that left 25 dead. Trump blamed Iran for the embassy attack and deployed 750 troops to Baghdad.

== History by government agency ==
Note: This section is provided for updates by government body or agency in narrative format, if desired.

=== EPA ===
In December 2019, the EPA announced that it will seek to address concerns emphasized by American farmers over new rules for blending biofuels.

=== Education Department ===
In December 2019, consumer advocates sued the U.S. Department of Education and the Consumer Financial Protection Bureau, alleging that these government agencies had failed to protect student loan borrowers. The lawsuit provides an overview of the alleged problems. The U.S. Department of Education is the biggest player in the student loan world, handling hundreds of billions of dollars in federal student loan debt. Rather than managing this sprawling portfolio itself, however, the department outsources operations to several large servicing companies.

Large student loan servicing firms such as Navient, FedLoan Servicing have been faced with allegations of violations of consumer protection statutes. But the Department of Education has largely not addressed these issues, and has omitted to oversee its servicers (who receive billions from taxpayers).

=== FCC ===
On December 12 the Federal Communications Commission approved a proposal to designate 988 as the hotline phone number of the National Suicide Prevention Lifeline.

=== FDA ===
In late December, the Food and Drug Administration raised the legal age for tobacco products, e-cigarettes, and vaping cartridges from 18 to 21.

=== Justice Department ===
A redacted version of the Report on the Investigation into Russian Interference in the 2016 Presidential Election was published on July 21. The report looks at not only Russian interference into the election but also alleged obstruction of justice by President Trump.

The death penalty for federal crimes was reinstated in July. The last federal execution was that of Louis Jones Jr. in 2003. There are currently five prisoners on death row. In December, the Supreme Court put the executions on hold.

== History by issue ==
Note: This section is provided for issue-based overviews in narrative format, if desired.

=== Climate change ===
In December 2019, the World Meteorological Organization released its annual climate report revealing that climate impacts are worsening. They found the global sea temperatures are rising as well as land temperatures worldwide. 2019 is the last year in a decade that is the warmest on record.

Global carbon emissions hit a record high in 2019, even though the rate of increase slowed somewhat, according to a report from Global Carbon Project.

=== Banking and finance ===
In the first half of 2019, global debt levels reached a record high of $250 trillion, led by the US and China. The IMF warned about corporate debt. The European Central Bank raised concerns as well. There were concerns about economic conditions in the EU due to high rates of debt in France, Italy and Spain.

=== Foreign policy ===
==== Yemen conflict ====
In April 2019, Trump vetoed a bipartisan bill which would have ended US support for the Saudi-led military intervention. With 53 votes instead of the 67 needed, the United States Senate failed to override the veto. The legal arguments and policies of the Obama administration were cited as justification for the veto. The US Deputy Assistant Secretary of Defense Michael Mulroy stated that US support was limited to side-by-side coaching to mitigate civilian casualties and if the measure had passed it would do nothing to help the people of Yemen and may only increase civilian deaths. Mulroy supported the United Nations' peace talks and he pushed the international community to come together and chart a comprehensive way ahead for Yemen. Writing in The Nation, Mohamad Bazzi argued that Mulroy's defence of US support as necessary to limit civilian casualties was false, and that "Saudi leaders and their allies have ignored American entreaties to minimize civilian casualties since the war's early days".

=== World trade ===
==== US-China Trade Dispute ====
A trade dispute between the US and China caused economic concerns worldwide. In December 2019, various US officials said a trade deal was likely before a proposed round of new tariffs took effect on December 15, 2019. US tariffs had a negative effect on China's economy, which slowed to growth of 6%. In December 2019, new deal was announced regarding US-China trade dispute.

==== United States–Mexico–Canada Agreement ====
The United States–Mexico–Canada Agreement is a signed but not ratified free trade agreement between Canada, Mexico, and the United States. The Agreement is the result of a 2017–2018 renegotiation of the North American Free Trade Agreement (NAFTA) by its member states. Negotiations "focused largely on auto exports, steel and aluminum tariffs, and the dairy, egg, and poultry markets." One provision "prevents any party from passing laws that restrict the cross-border flow of data". Compared to NAFTA, USMCA increases environmental and labour regulations, and incentivizes more domestic production of cars and trucks. The agreement also provides updated intellectual property protections, gives the United States more access to Canada's dairy market, imposes a quota for Canadian and Mexican automotive production, and increases the duty free limit for Canadians who buy U.S. goods online from $20 to $150.

=== Technology ===
The introduction of new 5G wireless technology caused major public discussion about possible security risks and safety risks. Many experts said 5G would require new methods to insure security of data. The US Congress passed legislation regarding security concerns about 5G networks. The federal government prohibited the utilization of Huawei equipment for 5G networks due security concerns, and encouraged its allies to also do so as well. The US government imposed strict controls on US companies as to their ability to do business with Huawei, thus disrupting sales of Huawei phones overseas.

Huawei submitted a petition in the US Court of Appeals for the Fifth Circuit against the FCC's decision to prohibit rural U.S. network providers from using equipment from the China-based vendor due to national security concerns, asking that the recent FCC order be overturned.

== See also ==
- 2019 in politics and government
