= Edinburg, North Dakota =

- City
- Motto: "The Kind Of Small Town Every Other Small Town Would Like To Be"
- Location of Edinburg, North Dakota
- Coordinates: 48°29′44″N 97°51′47″W
- Country: United States
- State: North Dakota
- County: Walsh
- Founded: 1887

Area
  - Total: 0.32 sq mi (0.82 km^{2})
  - Land: 0.32 sq mi (0.82 km^{2})
  - Water: 0 sq mi (0.00 km^{2})
- Elevation: 1,191 ft (363 m)

Population (2020)
  - Total: 199
  - Estimate (2022): 199
  - Density: 627.7/sq mi (242.36/km^{2})
- Time zone: UTC-6 (Central (CST))
  - Summer (DST): UTC-5 (CDT)
- ZIP code: 58227
- Area code: 701
- FIPS code: 38-22260
- GNIS feature ID: 1036017
- Website: edinburgnd.com

Edinburg is a city in Walsh County, North Dakota, United States. The population was 199 at the 2020 census.

== History ==
Edinburg was founded in 1887. The State Bank of Edinburg building, built in 1900, and the WPA Auditorium, built 1938, are both on the National Register of Historic Places.

== Geography ==
According to the United States Census Bureau, the city has a total area of 0.31 square miles (0.80 km^{2}), all land.

== Demographics ==
Historical population
Census	Pop.	Note	%±
1900	286		—
1910	300		4.9%
1920	278		−7.3%
1930	284		2.2%
1940	378		33.1%
1950	343		−9.3%
1960	330		−3.8%
1970	315		−4.5%
1980	300		−4.8%
1990	284		−5.3%
2000	252		−11.3%
2010	196		−22.2%
2020	199		1.5%
2022 (est.)	199		0.0%
U.S. Decennial Census; 2020 Census

=== 2010 census ===
As of the census of 2010, there were 196 people, 107 households, and 59 families residing in the city. The population density was 632.3 inhabitants per square mile (244.1/km^{2}). There were 125 housing units at an average density of 403.2 per square mile (155.7/km^{2}). The racial makeup of the city was 95.4% White, 0.5% Asian, 3.6% from other races, and 0.5% from two or more races. Hispanic or Latino of any race were 2.6% of the population.

There were 107 households, of which 16.8% had children under the age of 18 living with them, 50.5% were married couples living together, 3.7% had a female householder with no husband present, 0.9% had a male householder with no wife present, and 44.9% were non-families. 43.0% of all households were made up of individuals, and 24.3% had someone living alone who was 65 years of age or older. The average household size was 1.83 and the average family size was 2.47.

The median age in the city was 55.7 years. 12.2% of residents were under the age of 18; 5.3% were between the ages of 18 and 24; 17.9% were from 25 to 44; 31.6% were from 45 to 64; and 33.2% were 65 years of age or older. The gender makeup of the city was 46.9% male and 53.1% female.

=== 2000 census ===
As of the census of 2000, there were 252 people, 118 households, and 73 families residing in the city. The population density was 831.5 inhabitants per square mile (321.0/km^{2}). There were 132 housing units at an average density of 435.6 per square mile (168.2/km^{2}). The racial makeup of the city was 97.22% White, 0.40% Asian, 0.40% from other races, and 1.98% from two or more races. Hispanic or Latino of any race were 0.40% of the population.

There were 118 households, out of which 22.0% had children under the age of 18 living with them, 53.4% were married couples living together, 7.6% had a female householder with no husband present, and 37.3% were non-families. 35.6% of all households were made up of individuals, and 20.3% had someone living alone who was 65 years of age or older. The average household size was 2.14 and the average family size was 2.74.

In the city, the population was spread out, with 19.8% under the age of 18, 5.2% from 18 to 24, 21.8% from 25 to 44, 27.4% from 45 to 64, and 25.8% who were 65 years of age or older. The median age was 47 years. For every 100 females, there were 95.3 males. For every 100 females age 18 and over, there were 90.6 males.

The median income for a household in the city was $28,500, and the median income for a family was $36,250. Males had a median income of $27,159 versus $20,000 for females. The per capita income for the city was $16,430. About 6.0% of families and 8.9% of the population were below the poverty line, including 19.3% of those under the age of eighteen and 9.2% of those 65 or over.
