= Cristina Bautista Taquinas =

Colombian activist (1977–2019)

- Born: 1977; Vereda La Capilla, Corinto, Cauca, Colombia
- Died: October 29, 2019 (aged 41–42); Vereda La Luz, Tacueyo, Cauca, Colombia
- Education: Degree in Social Work from the School of Social Work and Human Development of Universidad del Valle
- Movement: Hilando Pensamiento

Cristina Bautista Taquinas (1977–2019) was a Colombian activist, community leader of the Paez/Nasa people of Colombia, and social worker. She dedicated her life to defending indigenous peoples' lands, and fighting for indigenous women's rights.

== Early life ==
Cristina Bautista Taquinas was born in 1977 la vereda La Capilla in Corinto, a small town in Colombia’s Cauca department. She was the oldest of five siblings, and her childhood consisted of taking care of her younger siblings from the time she was six years old. While her parents worked to financially support her family, as a child she would take her siblings to daycare before school, cook, and do the laundry for her family. At age twelve, she left home to support her family financially and worked in various homes and fincas, cooking for the finca workers and doing their laundry. At thirteen, she moved to the city nearest her hometown, Cali, to work and her employer encouraged her to attend high school there. Despite never finishing elementary school due to early work, she was accepted into a high school based on her entrance exam performance and eventually graduated.

== Education ==
She stayed in Cali and attended Universidad del Valle, first studying occupational therapy. She rented a small room and put herself through college by being a vendor in one of Cali’s soccer stadiums. She would sell orange juice made of oranges that her family would send her from their reservation of Tacueyo back home, and would also sell "cholado", a traditional treat from Cali.

Despite financial hardship and her family encouraging her to drop out, she continued and shifted her focus to social work. She was passionate about the work as it to her own Paez/Nasa community’s struggles of marginalization, and violence against indigenous women and people at large by the Colombian armed conflict that plagued her land by guerilla groups such as the FARC who often kidnapped and murdered people of her community. In 2017, she was granted a scholarship in the Human Rights Training Program for Indigenous Peoples of Latin America. In 2018, she graduated with her degree in Social Work from the School of Social Work and Human Development of Universidad del Valle.

== Activism ==
After her graduation in 2018, she returned home to the Paez/Nasa Tacueyo reservation in Toribio, Cauca and wanted to apply her social work studies in her community. Her activism focused on violence against women, not only on her reservation but in her town and department at large, and united peers, friends, and any indigenous woman who wanted to participate to share their experiences. She dreamed of women holding positions of leadership in the Paez/Nasa community, and wanted to fight for women’s rights and equality. She wanted Toribio to not only be the start of the women’s movement in Cauca, but in Colombia as a whole, and beyond.

=== Hilando Pensamiento ===
She founded a movement called "Hilando Pensamiento" (or Weaving Thoughts) to empower and encourage indigenous women to dream and believed they had the right to develop, grow, and make important decisions. The women in the Hilando Pensamiento group faced discrimination from the community, especially from traditional male leaders who labelled them subversive and disapproved of their group, which challenged established social norms and customs. She advocated for equal pay to truly value women’s work, which she believed was often double-shifted, one during the day and one at home caring for the family..

Initially disorganised and without fixed meeting places, the group travelled El Valle, sharing their vision of women’s autonomy and growth. Despite resistance from men and some women, Cristina remained steadfast in her belief in empowering women and educating future generations. The "Hilando Pensamiento" Movement got accredited by the United Nations Permanent Forum on Indigenous Issues in 2019.

=== Leadership ===
With her women empowerment movement, Cristina longed to become part of the Constituyente Nasa, the constituent assembly responsible for developing the constitution of the Paez/Nasa people. Her goal was to gain her own spot on the assembly to represent women with her movement and help make decisions in the community. She was rejected many times and was humiliated, but she continued attending assembly meetings until she gained a seat of her own in the assembly as an editor. Her position on the Nasa Constituent Assembly made her very notable in her community, as people wanted her to run for governor. She intended to continue her studies to earn her Master’s, but eventually accepted a position as Nasa governor.

As a social worker, founder of an accredited women’s movement, having a seat on her community’s constituent assembly and governor of the Paez/Nasa community, in early 2019 she traveled to the United Nations Permanent Forum on Indigenous Issues headquarters in New York to represent indigenous women. Her talk in this forum called attention to the hardships and violence indigenous peoples in Colombia were facing at the hands of FARC guerilla groups, as well as the inequalities and struggles women faced. At this event, she was internationally recognized as a representative of indigenous peoples.

== Death ==
As sovereign people, the Paez/Nasa have their own police-like Native Guard made up of volunteers that defend and protect their territories. Following tradition, they are unarmed as they carry traditional wooden sticks adorned with ribbons. In August 2019, two Paez/Nasa Native Guards were killed. In response to this murder of her people as well as the murder of many others, Cristina spoke out against the violence that has plagued her community for years.

On October 29, 2019, some Paez/Nasa Native Guards were patrolling an area of the reservation, Vereda La Luz, when they were alerted to the presence of an unknown vehicle carrying kidnapped individuals. The guards blocked the vehicle on the road and called for backup. Four more guards, Cristina, and another female Nasa governor answered their plea for help, and when they arrived, started to help free the kidnapped people trapped in the vehicle. The incident was an attack by the FARC guerilla. Hidden attackers then rained gunfire and grenades on the helpers, killing Cristina, four Native Guards, and injuring five more.

== Legacy ==
Despite Cristina's death, her "Hilando Pensamientos" movement is still active, posting on their social media pages and organizing events. Her community still fights for peace in their land, and equality for all. Her death brought international attention to the Paez/Nasa’s cause, and has received attention and help from the Colombian government as well. A mural in Cristina’s honor was added to her alma mater, Universidad del Valle.
