= 2019 Hong Kong Rural Representative election =

- 6 January 2019–20 January 2019

All 1,540 Rural Representatives
- Turnout: 60.58%
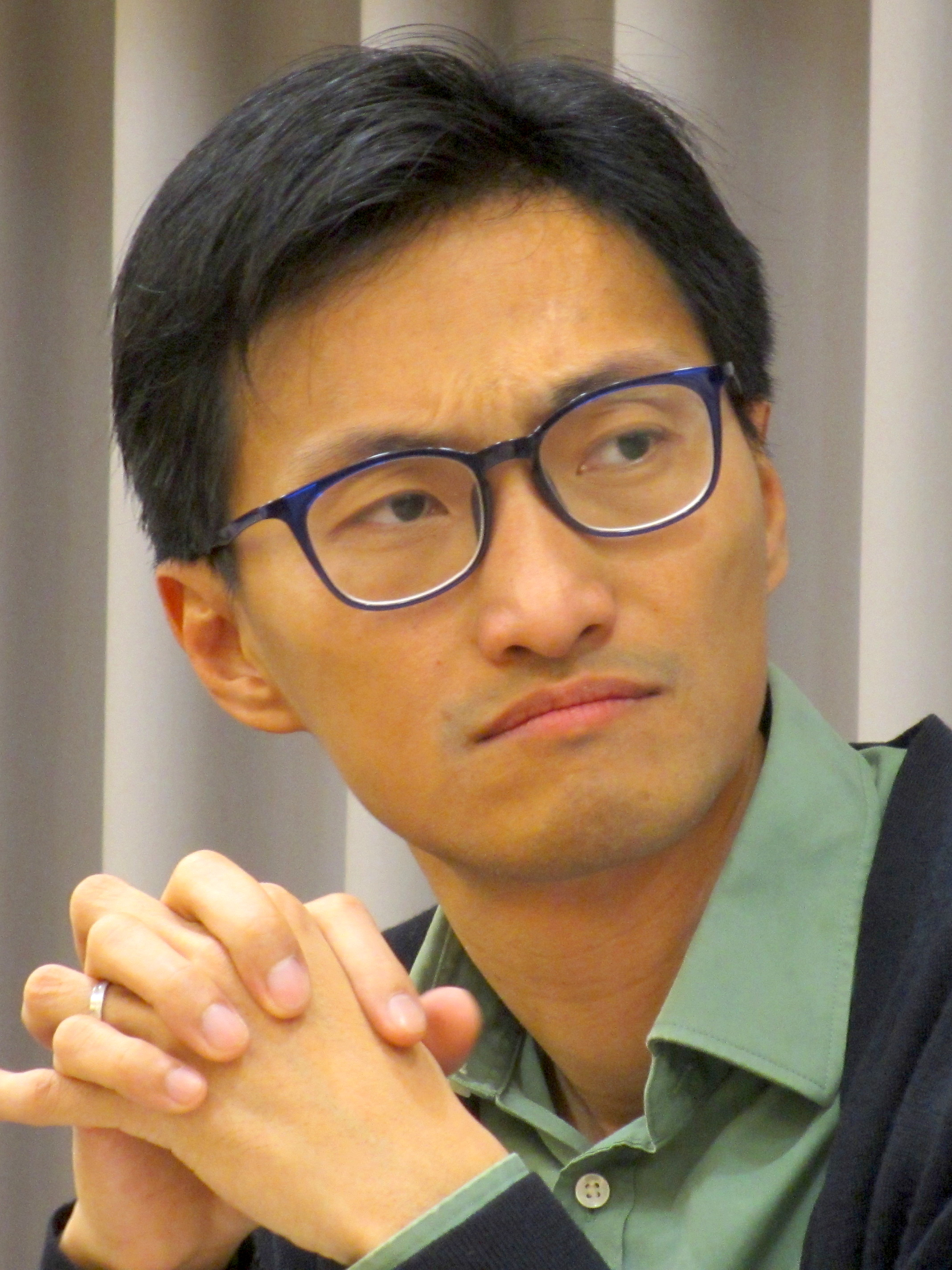
	Majority party
Leader	Eddie Chu
Party	Village Charter
Alliance	Pro-democracy
Leader's seat	Yuen Kong San Tseun (Disqualified)
Seats before	New party
Seats won	0

2019 Hong Kong Rural Representative election was held in January 2019 to elect 1,540 Rural Representatives in the New Territories of Hong Kong. This is the first time pro-democracy camp formed electoral alliance to run in the rural election, despite co-initiator Eddie Chu was disqualified and the alliance failed to gain any seats.

== Electoral system ==
Breakdown of Number of Rural Areas and Rural Representatives By District
District	No. of Existing Village	No. of Resident Representatives	No. of Indigenous Villages & Composite Indigenous Villages	No. of Indigenous Inhabitants Representatives	No. of Market Towns	No. of Kaifong Representatives	Total no. of Rural Representatives
Islands	80	80	66	71	2	56	207
Kwai Tsing	10	10	9	18	-	-	28
North	117	117	97	132	-	-	249
Sai Kung	91	91	77	89	-	-	180
Sha Tin	48	48	46	55	-	-	103
Tai Po	122	122	125	151	-	-	273
Tsuen Wan	37	37	38	69	-	-	106
Tuen Mun	35	35	24	33	-	-	68
Yuen Long	155	155	121	171	-	-	326
Total	695	695	603	789	2	56	1,540

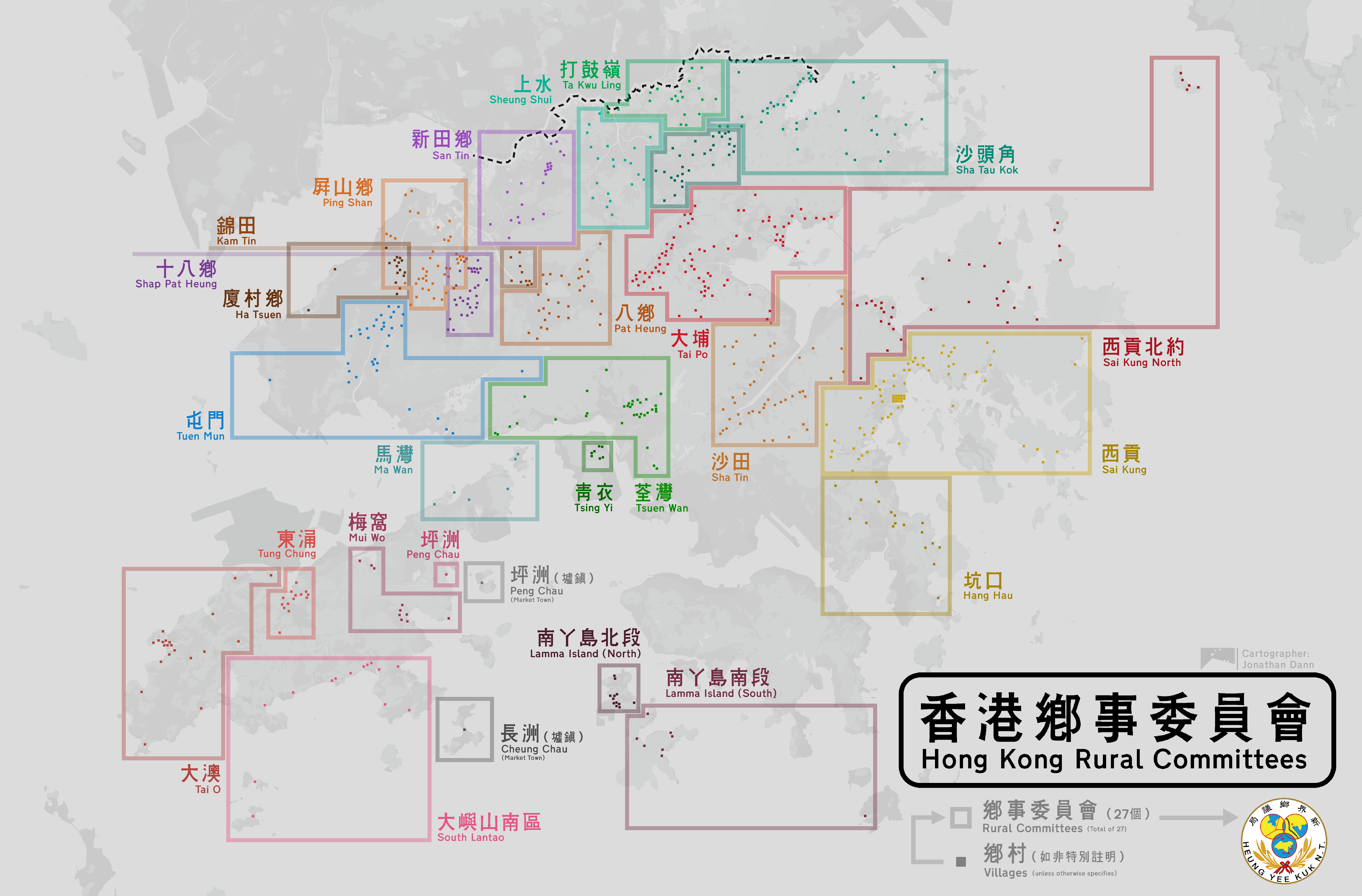
Map of Villages and Market Towns

A total of 1,540 seats were open for election. Each Existing Village elects one Resident Representatives, while Indigenous Village & Composite Indigenous Village elects one to five Indigenous Inhabitants Representatives. The Market Towns of Cheung Chau and Peng Chau elect 39 and 17 Kaifong Representatives respectively.

Detailed breakdown as follows:

- 589 Existing Villages (including 574 Indigenous Villages and 15 Composite Indigenous Villages) elect both Indigenous Inhabitants Representatives and Resident Representatives
- 106 Existing Villages elect only Resident Representatives
- 14 Indigenous Villages elect only Indigenous Inhabitants Representatives
- 2 Market Towns elect only Kaifong Representatives

== Pre-election events ==
The nomination period of the election opened on 9 November and closed on 22 November 2018.

Eddie Chu, member of the Legislative Council, and Paul Zimmerman, Southern District Councillor, initiated the Village Charter movement on 7 November 2018 under the slogan "Let's make our village clean and green", calling for the reform of rural representation system and the democratization of Rural Committees, which elected Rural Representatives will serve in. This marked the first time pro-democracy camp coordinated in the rural election.

=== Disqualification ===
Eddie Chu became the first candidate barred from running in the rural election because of their political stance. He was disqualified from running in the election after electoral officials questioned his stance on Hong Kong independence and self-determination and invalidated his nomination for “implicitly” maintaining support for self-determination. Chu branded the decision "ridiculous" for "disqualifying an incumbent legislator from running for the post of a village chief". The village election process was temporarily put on hold as government considered Chu's candidacy.

Chu later filed an election petition to the High Court over the disqualification, but withdrew in January 2020 after taking into account the outcome of the election petition by Agnes Chow, which ruled Returning Officer can disqualify candidates.

== Voting ==
The election took place on three consecutive Sundays in January 2019.

Only 436 seats were open for contest with a total of 836 candidates, as 105 villages received no valid nomination and hence no elections were held, while nearly a thousand candidates were uncontested, including the Market Town of Peng Chau.

Date	District	Rural Committee
6 January 2019	Islands	Lamma Island (North); Lamma Island (South); Mui Wo; South Lantao
6 January 2019	North	Sha Tau Kok District, Ta Kwu Ling District
6 January 2019	Sai Kung	Hang Hau
6 January 2019	Sha Tin	Sha Tin
6 January 2019	Tai Po District	Tai Po
6 January 2019	Yuen Long	Kam Tin, Ping Shan, San Tin
13 January 2019	Islands	Tai O, Tung Chung
13 January 2019	Kwai Tsing/Tsuen Wan	Tsuen Wan, Ma Wan
13 January 2019	North	Fanling District, Sheung Shui District
13 January 2019	Sai Kung	Sai Kung
13 January 2019	Tai Po	Sai Kung North
13 January 2019	Tuen Mun	Tuen Mun
13 January 2019	Yuen Long	Ha Tseun, Pat Heung, Shap Pat Heung
20 January 2019	Islands	Cheung Chau

== Result ==
Turnout of the election is as follows:

Election	Registered	Turnout	
Resident Representative	33,497	21,239	63.67%
Indigenous Inhabitant Representative	51,955	31,282	60.21%
Kaifong Representative	7,104	3,553	50.01%
Total	92,556	56,074	60.58%

=== Pro-democracy camp ===
For candidates of the pro-democracy Village Charter, none successfully won a seat. William Ho did not gather enough nominations and was not enlisted as a candidate. In Pan Long Wan, Paul Zimmerman was defeated overwhelmingly by 12–110 after admitting no hope to win the election, similar for Carol Ho of Pak Kong by 23–110. Herve Bouvresses, running for re-election, and David Newbery lost by 10–16 and 10–14 respectively.

Signatories of Village Charter
Name	Political affiliation	Constituency	Rural Committee	Result
Eddie Chu	Team Chu	Yuen Kong San Tseun (Resident)	Pat Heung	Disqualified
Paul Zimmerman	Nonpartisan	Pan Long Wan (Resident)	Hang Hau	Lost
Carol Ho Kit-yee	Nonpartisan	Pak Kong (Resident)	Sai Kung	Lost
William Ho Wai-lim	Demosisto	Sheung Shui Heung (Indigenous Inhabitant)	Sheung Shui	Not nominated
David Newbery	Nonpartisan	Hoi Ha (Resident)	Sai Kung North	Lost
Herve Bouvresse	Nonpartisan	Long Keng (Resident)	Sai Kung	Lost

Stanley Ho Wai-hong from the Labour Party, who advocated ending indigenous rights of housing, was defeated by conservative in Ko Tong of Sai Kung. Sum Shui-ying of Democratic Party was declared elected as the sole candidate of Wa Mei Shan in Fanling, who promised to bring voices of democracy into the Rural Committee.

Half a year after the election defeat amidst the pro-democracy protest movement, Carol Ho received threats accusing her of supporting Hong Kong independence and hampering the peace of the village.

=== Cheung Chau ===
With 65 candidates vying for 39 seats, Cheung Chau is one of the closely watched races. Voter shall cast ballot for 39 candidates under block voting system.

Reformist Cheung Chau Synergy, led by pro-business Cheung Chau South District Councillor Kwong Koon-wan, and conservative Cheung Chau Community Alliance, by pro-Beijing Cheung Chau North District Councillor Lee Kwai-chun, fielded 33 and 32 candidates respectively. As the two Cheung Chau constituencies in the District Council would merge into one in 2019 local election, the poll became increasingly competitive.

Community Alliance eventually took up 25 seats, while Synergy only won 14 but made a net gain of 8 seats compared to the last election. Perceived to be risky after losing support, the conservatives retained their majority and the control of Cheung Chau Rural Committee.

Party	Votes	%	Seats	+/–
Cheung Chau Community Alliance			25	▼6
Cheung Chau Synergy			14	▲8
Total			39	–
Valid votes	3,465	97.52		
Invalid/blank votes	88	2.48		
Total votes	3,553	100.00		
Registered voters/turnout	7,104	50.01		

=== Ping Yeung ===
In September 2018, Chan Kam-wah of Ping Yeung in Ta Kwu Ling declared breaking off parental relationship with his son, North District Councillor Frank Chan Shung-fai. Senior Chan slammed "unfilial" Frank Chan in the statement on newspaper, while Frank Chan said it was an attempt by his father to pressurize his ex-wife to turn over her possessions over a financial dispute with the new wife.

The election for Ping Yeung Indigenous Inhabitants Representatives saw eight candidates running for four seats. The four on Frank Chan's team were defeated, while Chan Kam-wah was re-elected with the highest number of votes amongst all. Despite so, Frank Chan's sister Chan Yuet-ming was elected as Resident Representative by one vote. Chan Kam-wah eventually abandoned his re-election bid as chairman of Ta Kwu Leng Rural Committee, and gave way to his daughter Chan Yuet-ming to become the first Rural Committee chairwoman in Hong Kong's history.

== Rural Committee chairman ==
Chairman of all 27 Rural Committees were elected by April 2019, who would serve as ex-officio members of respective District Councils and as members of the Heung Yee Kuk.

District	Rural Committee	Chairman	Remarks
Islands	Cheung Chau	Yung Chi-ming	Re-elected
Islands	Lamma Island (North)	Chan Lin-wai	Re-elected
Islands	Lamma Island (South)	Chow Yuk-tong	Re-elected
Islands	Mui Wo	Wong Man-hon	Re-elected
Islands	Peng Chau	Ken Wong Hon-kuen	Re-elected
Islands	South Lantao	Ho Chun-fai	
Islands	Tai O	Ho Siu-kei	
Islands	Tung Chung	Wong Chau-ping	First chairwoman
North	Fanling District	Li Kwok-fung	Re-elected
North	Sha Tau Kok District	Lee Koon-hung	Re-elected
North	Sheung Shui District	Hau Chi-keung	Re-elected
North	Ta Kwu Ling District	Chan Yuet-ming	First chairwoman
Sai Kung	Hang Hau	Lau Kai-hong	
Sai Kung	Sai Kung	Wong Shui-sang	Re-elected
Sha Tin	Sha Tin	Mok Kam-kwai	Re-elected
Tai Po	Sai Kung North	Li Yiu-ban	Re-elected
Tai Po	Tai Po	Lam Yick-kuen	
Kwai Tsing/ Tsuen Wan	Tsing Yi	Chan Chi-wong	
Kwai Tsing/ Tsuen Wan	Ma Wan	Chan Sung-ip	Re-elected
Kwai Tsing/ Tsuen Wan	Tsuen Wan	Yau Kam-ping	
Tuen Mun	Tuen Mun	Kenneth Lau Ip-keung	Re-elected
Yuen Long	Ha Tsuen	Tang Lai-tung	Re-elected
Yuen Long	Kam Tin	Tang Ho-nin	Re-elected
Yuen Long	Pat Heung	Tang Sui-man	Re-elected
Yuen Long	Ping Shan	Tang Che-keung	Re-elected
Yuen Long	San Tin	Jimmy Man Mei-kwai	Died in office
Yuen Long	Shap Pat Heung	Ching Chan-ming	
