= Rural Representative elections =

The Rural Representative elections are the quadrennial elections to elect the rural representatives which consist of the village representatives and kaifong representatives in the New Territories of Hong Kong. The rural representatives are responsible for electing the executive committees of their respective rural committees in which to elect the members of the Heung Yee Kuk.

== Background ==
The Rural community in the New Territories has all the time had its own village representative elections. The previous electoral systems for a village or a group of villages came up around the end of World War II, in which they were conducted privately on a clan basis. All the candidates and electors were the indigenous inhabitants, ie person who could establish their patrilineal descent from a resident of a village that was in existence before the 1898 Convention for the Extension of Hong Kong Territory.

In 1994, the Heung Yee Kuk drew up a set of "Model Rules" for the elections of some 700 villages, which were held every four years. The appointment of the elected village representatives had to be approved by the Secretary for Home Affairs. The "Model rules" system prevailed until 1999 when two non-indigenous inhabitants, Chan Wah of Po Toi O in Sai Kung and Tse Kwan-sang of Shek Wu Tong in Yuen Long challenged the validity of the electoral arrangements in their villages by judicial review proceedings. Chan was denied the right to vote even though he married an indigenous inhabitants while Tse was denied the right to stand. The cases were eventually heard by the Court of Final Appeal in December 2000, which ruled that the electoral arrangements were inconsistent with the Hong Kong Bill of Rights Ordinance while those in Po Toi O were also inconsistent with the Sex Discrimination Ordinance.

In view of the rulings, there were calls on the government to bring village representative elections under a statutory framework. In 2003, the government enacted the Village Representative Election Ordinance (Cap. 576), which was later renamed as Rural Representative Election Ordinance in 2014. In the proposal, the election would be held in an electoral system of two types of village representatives which represent both the indigenous and non-indigenous inhabitants.

The Village Representative Election Ordinance (Cap. 576) was later renamed as Rural Representative Election Ordinance in 2014, which created a new type of kaifong representative which only were introduced in Cheung Chau and Peng Chau Rural Committee of the Islands District, for the electing non-village representatives to reflect views on local affairs on behalf of Cheung Chau and Peng Chau residents.

== Composition ==
There are three different types of rural representatives. Under the village representatives, there are indigenous inhabitant representatives and resident representatives. Indigenous inhabitants are returned by the elector of indigenous inhabitants which have the exclusive power to deal with all affairs relating to traditional rights and interests of the indigenous villages, while resident representatives are to reflect view on behalf of the non-indigenous residents. Kaifong representatives only exist in Cheung Chau and Peng Chau which are elected by the market towns of the respective areas.

== Elections ==
=== 2003 ===
Breakdown of Number of Villages and Village Representatives By District
District	No. of Indigenous Village & Composite Indigenous Villages	No. of Indigenous Inhabitants Representatives (IIR)	No. of Existing Village	No. of Resident Resident Representatives (RR)	Total no. of IIR & RR
Islands	66	71	80	80	151
Kwai Tsing	9	18	8	8	26
North	97	132	117	117	249
Sai Kung	77	89	91	91	180
Sha Tin	46	55	48	48	103
Tai Po	124	150	121	121	271
Tsuen Wan	38	69	39	39	108
Tuen Mun	24	33	35	35	68
Yuen Long	120	170	154	154	324
Total	601	787	693	693	1,480

=== 2007 ===
Breakdown of Number of Villages and Village Representatives By District
District	No. of Indigenous Village & Composite Indigenous Villages	No. of Indigenous Inhabitants Representatives (IIR)	No. of Existing Village	No. of Resident Resident Representatives (RR)	Total no. of IIR & RR
Islands	66	71	80	80	151
Kwai Tsing	9	18	8	8	26
North	97	132	117	117	249
Sai Kung	77	89	91	91	180
Sha Tin	46	55	48	48	103
Tai Po	124	150	121	121	271
Tsuen Wan	38	69	39	39	108
Tuen Mun	24	33	35	35	68
Yuen Long	120	170	154	154	324
Total	601	787	693	693	1,480

=== 2011 ===
Breakdown of Number of Villages and Village Representatives By District
District	No. of Indigenous Village & Composite Indigenous Villages	No. of Indigenous Inhabitants Representatives (IIR)	No. of Existing Village	No. of Resident Resident Representatives (RR)	Total no. of IIR & RR
Islands	66	71	80	80	151
Kwai Tsing	9	18	10	10	28
North	97	132	117	117	249
Sai Kung	77	89	91	91	180
Sha Tin	46	55	48	48	103
Tai Po	125	151	122	122	273
Tsuen Wan	38	69	37	37	106
Tuen Mun	24	33	35	35	68
Yuen Long	121	171	155	155	326
Total	601	789	695	695	1,484

=== 2015 ===
Breakdown of Number of Rural Areas and Rural Representatives By District
District	No. of Existing Village	No. of Resident Representatives	No. of Indigenous Villages & Composite Indigenous Villages	No. of Indigenous Inhabitants Representatives	No. of Market Towns	No. of Kaifong Representatives	Total no. of Rural Representatives
Islands	80	80	66	71	2	56	207
Kwai Tsing	10	10	9	18	-	-	28
North	117	117	97	132	-	-	249
Sai Kung	91	91	77	89	-	-	180
Sha Tin	48	48	46	55	-	-	103
Tai Po	122	122	125	151	-	-	273
Tsuen Wan	37	37	38	69	-	-	106
Tuen Mun	35	35	24	33	-	-	68
Yuen Long	155	155	121	171	-	-	326
Total	695	695	601	789	2	56	1,540

=== 2023 ===
Breakdown of Number of Rural Areas and Rural Representatives By District
District	No. of Existing Village	No. of Resident Representatives	No. of Indigenous Villages & Composite Indigenous Villages	No. of Indigenous Inhabitants Representatives	No. of Market Towns	No. of Kaifong Representatives	Total no. of Rural Representatives
Islands	80	80	66	71	2	56	207
Kwai Tsing	10	10	9	18	-	-	28
North	117	117	97	132	-	-	249
Sai Kung	91	91	77	89	-	-	180
Sha Tin	48	48	46	55	-	-	103
Tai Po	122	122	125	151	-	-	273
Tsuen Wan	37	37	38	69	-	-	106
Tuen Mun	35	35	24	33	-	-	68
Yuen Long	155	155	121	171	-	-	326
Total	695	695	601	789	2	56	1,540

== Cheung Chau results ==
As most of the representatives were elected without opposition under a limited electoral base, Cheung Chau's Kaifong Representatives election was the focus for its relatively large number of seats and constituents.

Since Cheung Chau rural election became statutorily regulated by the authorities in 2015, it had been dominated by two main lists: reformist Cheung Chau Synergy, led by ex-Cheung Chau South councillor Ken Kwong Koon-wan, and conservative Cheung Chau Community Alliance, led by ex-Cheung Chau North councillor Lee Kwai-chun and chairman of Cheung Chau Rural Committee Yung Chi-ming.

Results of Cheung Chau rural election
Year	Elected_{/Standing}			Result	Turnout	Ref
Year	Conservative	Reformist	Unaligned	Result	Turnout	Ref
2015	31_{/31}	6_{/30}	2_{/9}		56.19%	
2019	25_{/33}	14_{/32}	0_{/0}		50.01%	
2023	37_{/37}	2_{/25}	0_{/5}		37.77%	
