= Chun Chu Temple =

Buddhist and Taoist temple in Hong Kong

Coordinates: 22°17′21.9″N 114°12′10.4″E

- 崇珠佛社
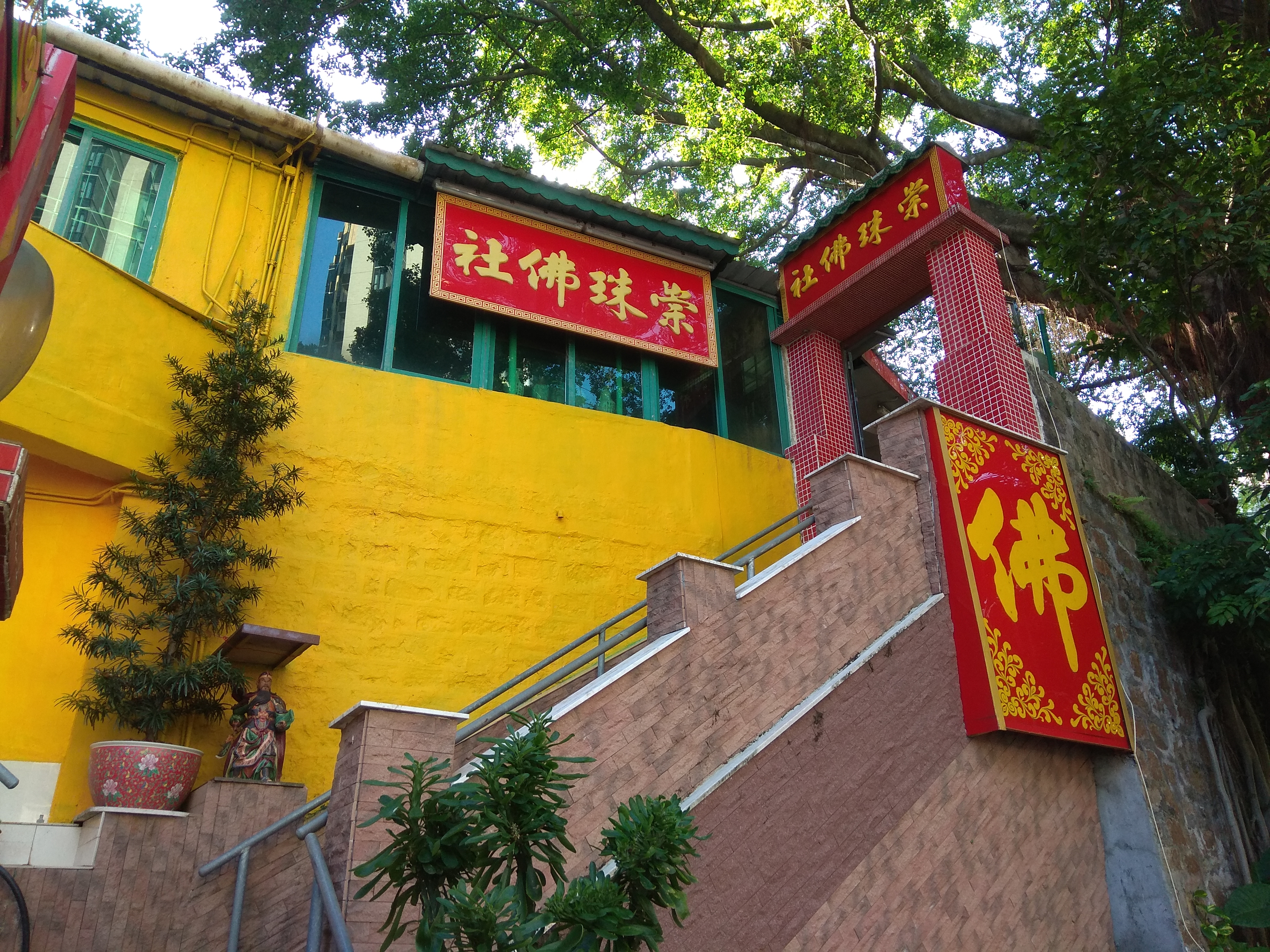
- Entrance of Chun Chu Temple
- Interactive map of the Chun Chu Temple area
- Alternative names: Sung Chu Temple, 崇珠閣壇, 崇珠閣

General information
- Location: North Point, Hong Kong, 1B Kai Yuen Street
- Opened: 1955

Chun Chu Temple (Chinese: 崇珠佛社; pinyin: chóng zhū fó shè; Jyutping: sung4 zyu1 fat6 se5; Cantonese Yale: sung4 jyu1 fat6 se5) is a Buddhist and Taoist temple located in 1B Kai Yuen Street, North Point, Hong Kong. Chun Chu Temple was constructed in 1955, founded by a community of Hakka and Hainan people living in North Point, including Lam Wing Fai (藍榮輝) and Li Yuk Yuen (李鈺圓).

During the 1950s to 1970s It is believed to be affiliated to the Kai Yuen Mansion (1930s-1970s) and its residents, the Chan Wai Chow family. The Chan Wai Chow family was an influential family which included notable people such as Chen Ji Tang a senior general of the Nationalist Chinese army, who at 1929-1936 was also the governor of the Guangdong province; Seaker S.K. Chan, a doctorate graduate of Colombia University, and founder of many schools in Hong Kong including Chan Shu Kui memorial school, Po Leung Kuk Madam Chan Wai Chow Memorial School (now Chan's Creative School).

Currently, the Chun Chu Temple is a registered temple recognized by the Chinese Temples Ordinance, with around 300 disciples in total.

== History ==
In the post war period, religious practices were being banned in mainland China. Hence many Vajrayana Buddhism Monks and scholars, borrowing from a renewed interest in Tibetan Esotericism, and Japanese Esotericism, moved to Hong Kong to spread their teachings. As a result, 1950s Hong Kong saw a boom in Vajrayana Buddhism, with multiple temples dedicated to the practice, such as 真如密院, and 普賢佛院 established during the decade.

Chun Chu Temple was constructed in 1955, with it being one of the notable early Buddhist temples in Hong Kong that practices not only Vajrayana Buddhism, but also Mahayana Buddhism, and Taoism. A rare combination within Hong Kong's temples.

During the 1950s and 1960s, it was notable for being an active part of the Kai Yuen Community, such as hosting lantern lighting ceremonies during Lantern Festival, and giving free drinks to the Kai Fong (locals).

Fuji (Planchette Writing) sessions, a Taoist tradition of using a suspended tray to guide a stick to write Chinese characters into sand or incense ash, were also hosted during the 1950s. Allowing Kai Fong to seek advice from the gods.

== Threats ==
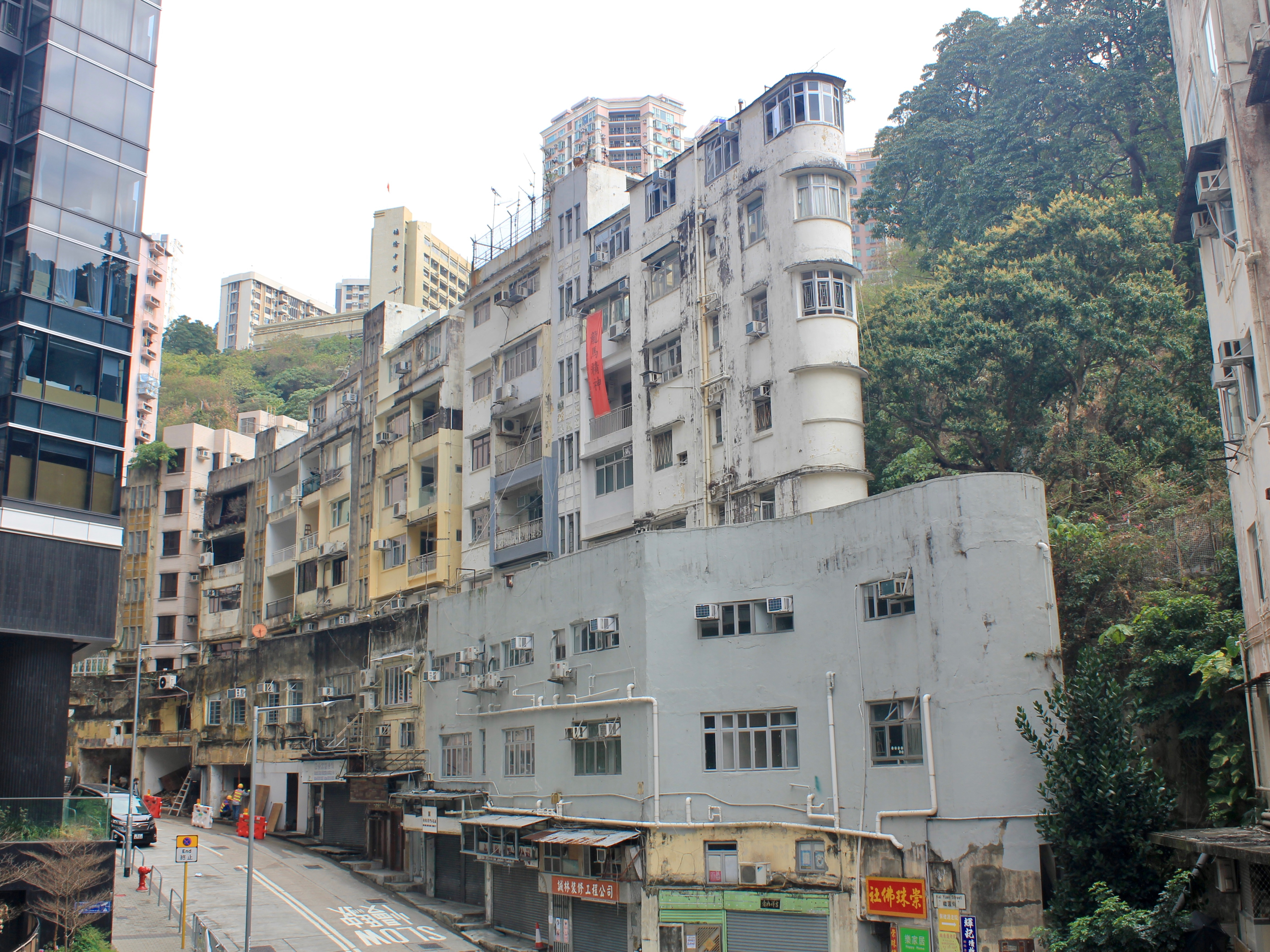
Tong Laus at Kai Yuen Street 60–74, demolished in 2021. High rise private residential flats are proposed.

From 2010 onward, historical buildings in Kai Yuen Hill are rapidly demolished, leaving some residents and activists worried about the fate of the remaining post-war architecture such Chun Chu Temple in Kai Yuen Hill.

The Kai Yuen Hill area has already seen many post-war buildings demolished for redevelopment. For example, in 2011, upper and lower Kai Yuen lane along with Tong Laus from the 1970s were demolished. While in 2021 a row of Tong Laus in 60–74 Kai Yuen Street from 1957, designed by architect Yam Koon Seng (任冠生) featuring a unique curved perimeter, was also demolished.

Scholar Fan Chi Wai believes that Chun Chu Temple is the only remaining building in the Kai Yuen area that relates back to Kai Yuen Mansion and the Chan Wai Chow family. Making the temple very significant within the history of Kai Yuen, and hence worthy of conservation.

== Gallery ==
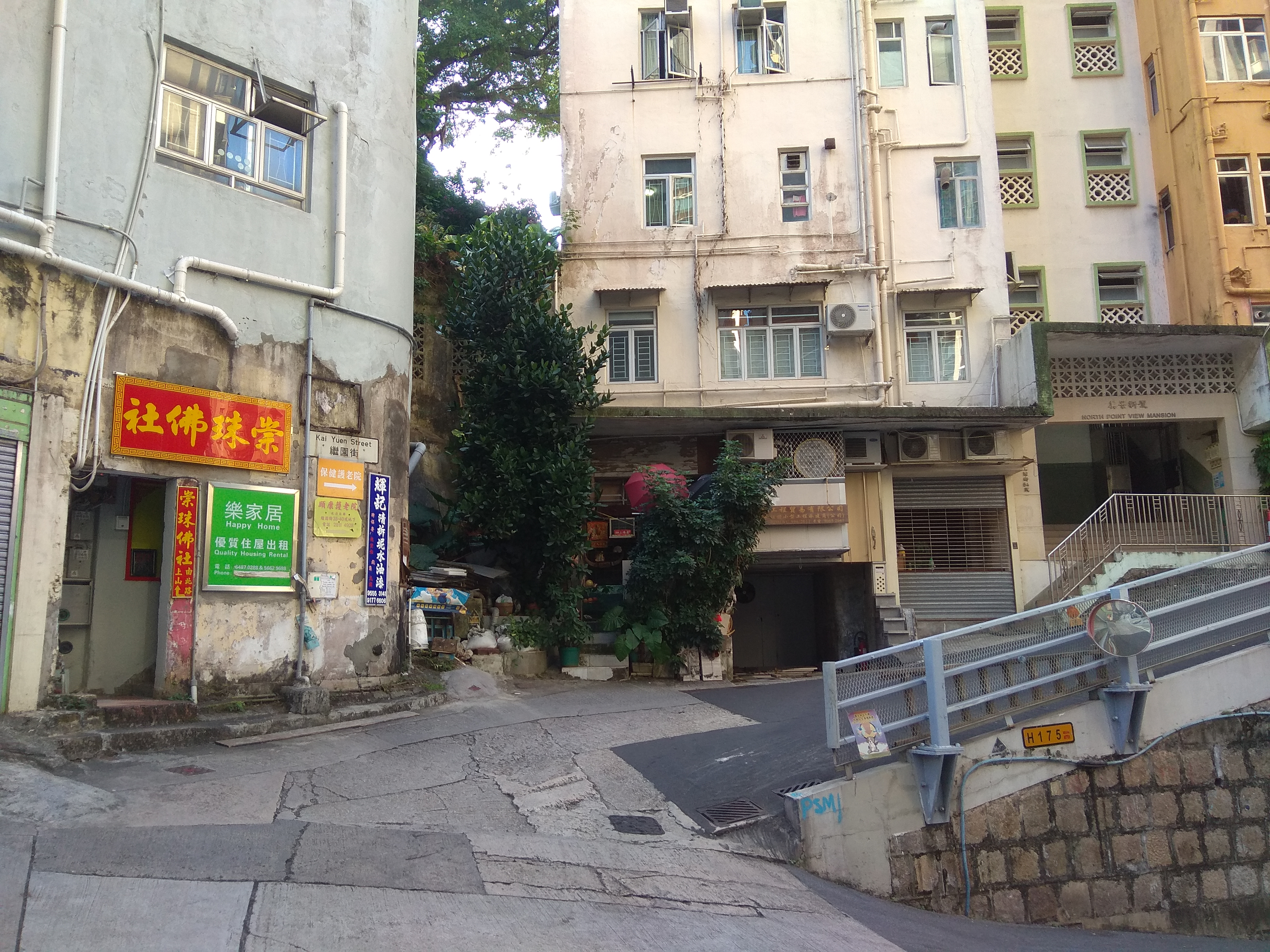
Kai Yuen Street entrance of Sung Chu Temple.

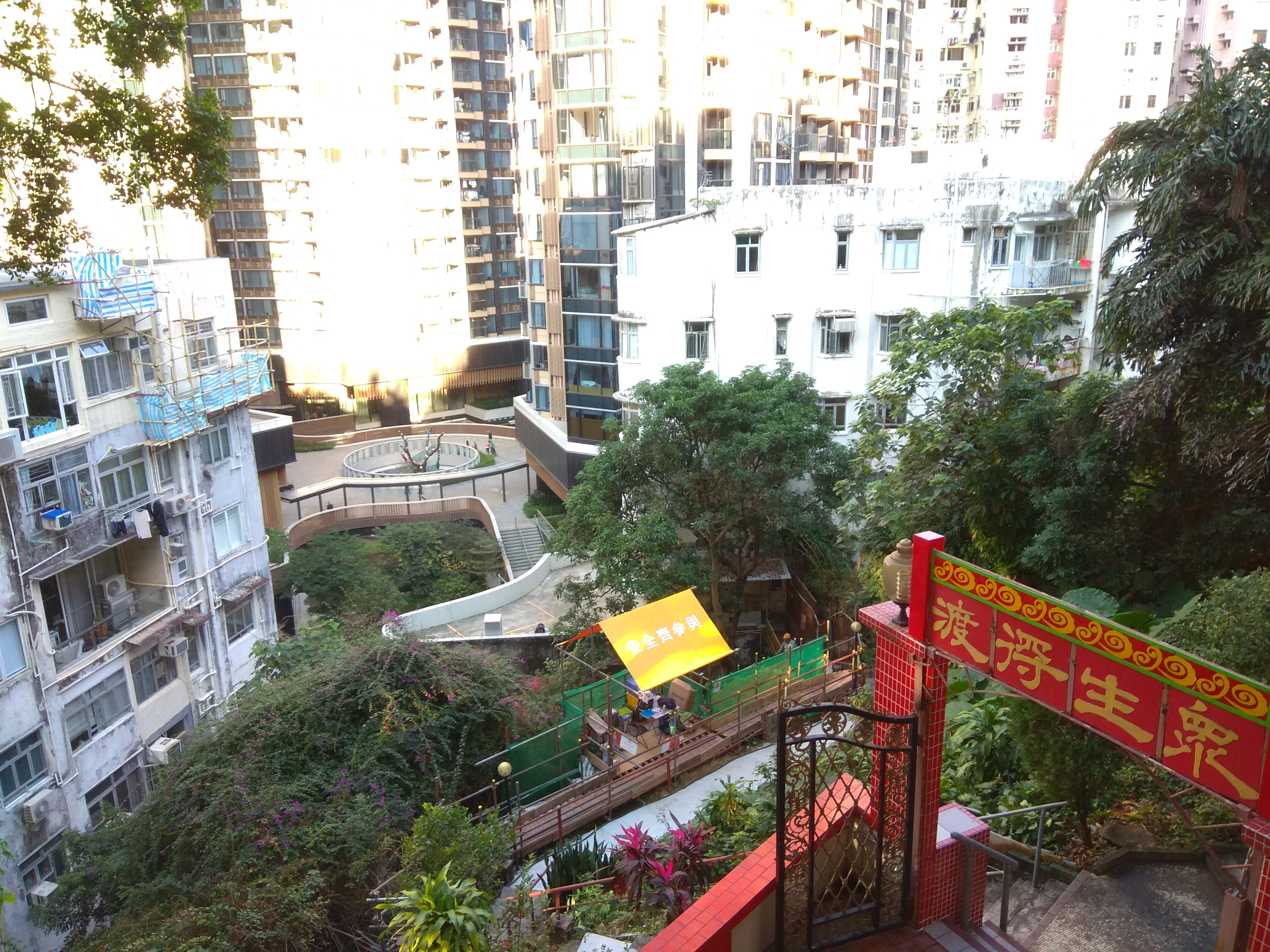
View of Kai Yuen Street from Chun Chu Temple.

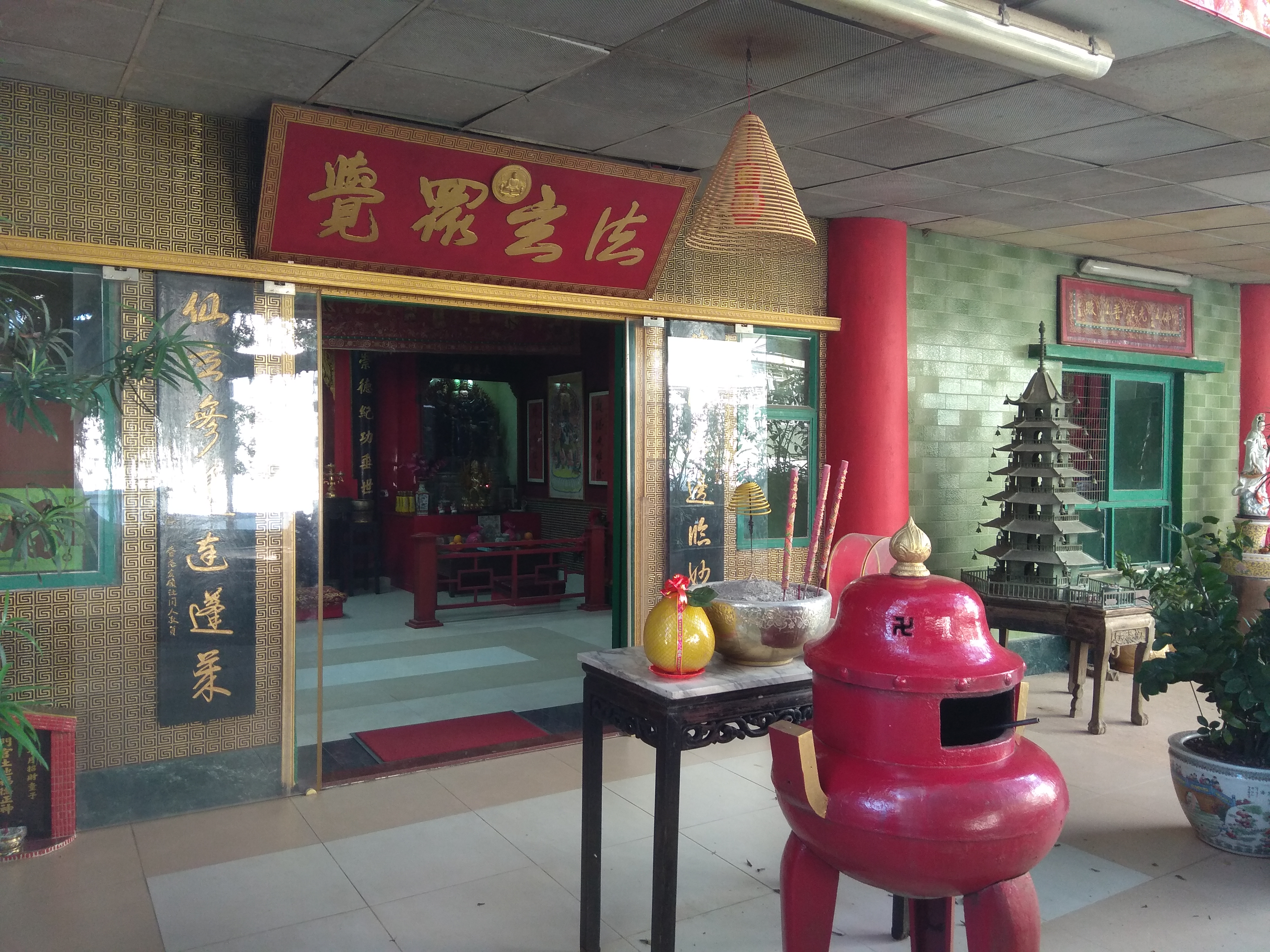
Entrance of Chun Chu Temple.

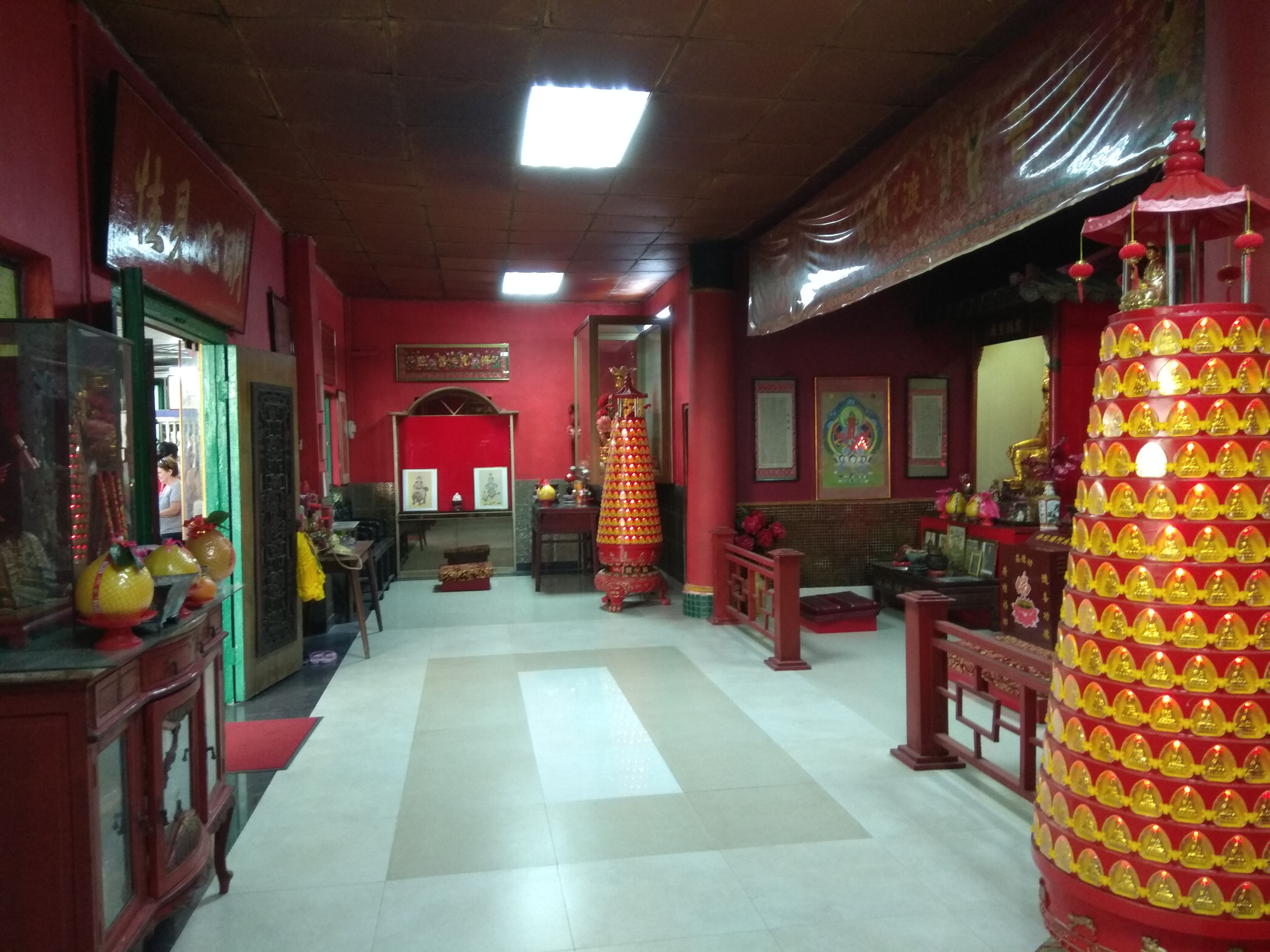
Interior of Chun Chu Temple

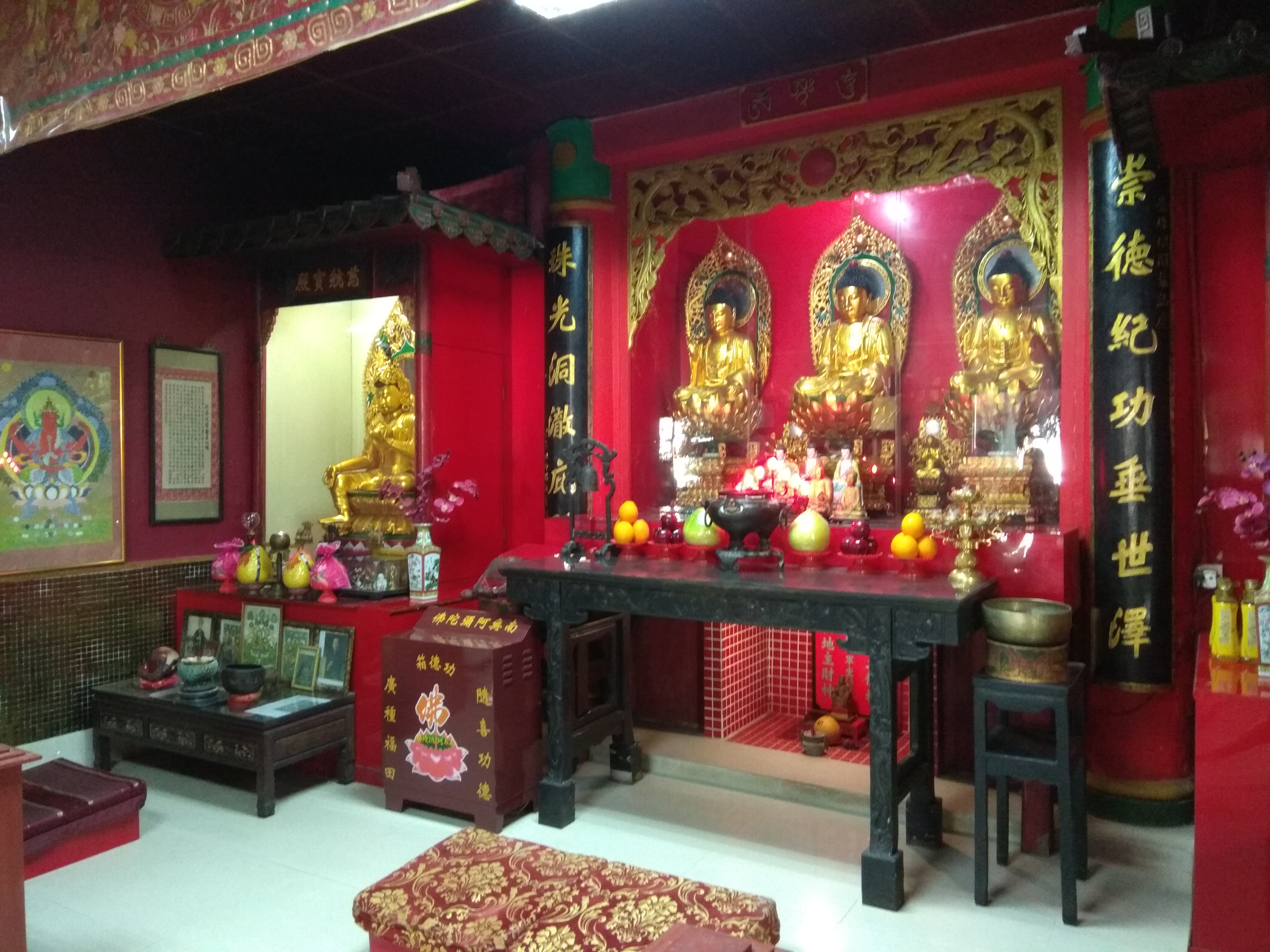
Altar of Chun Chu Temple, featuring The Three Buddhas.

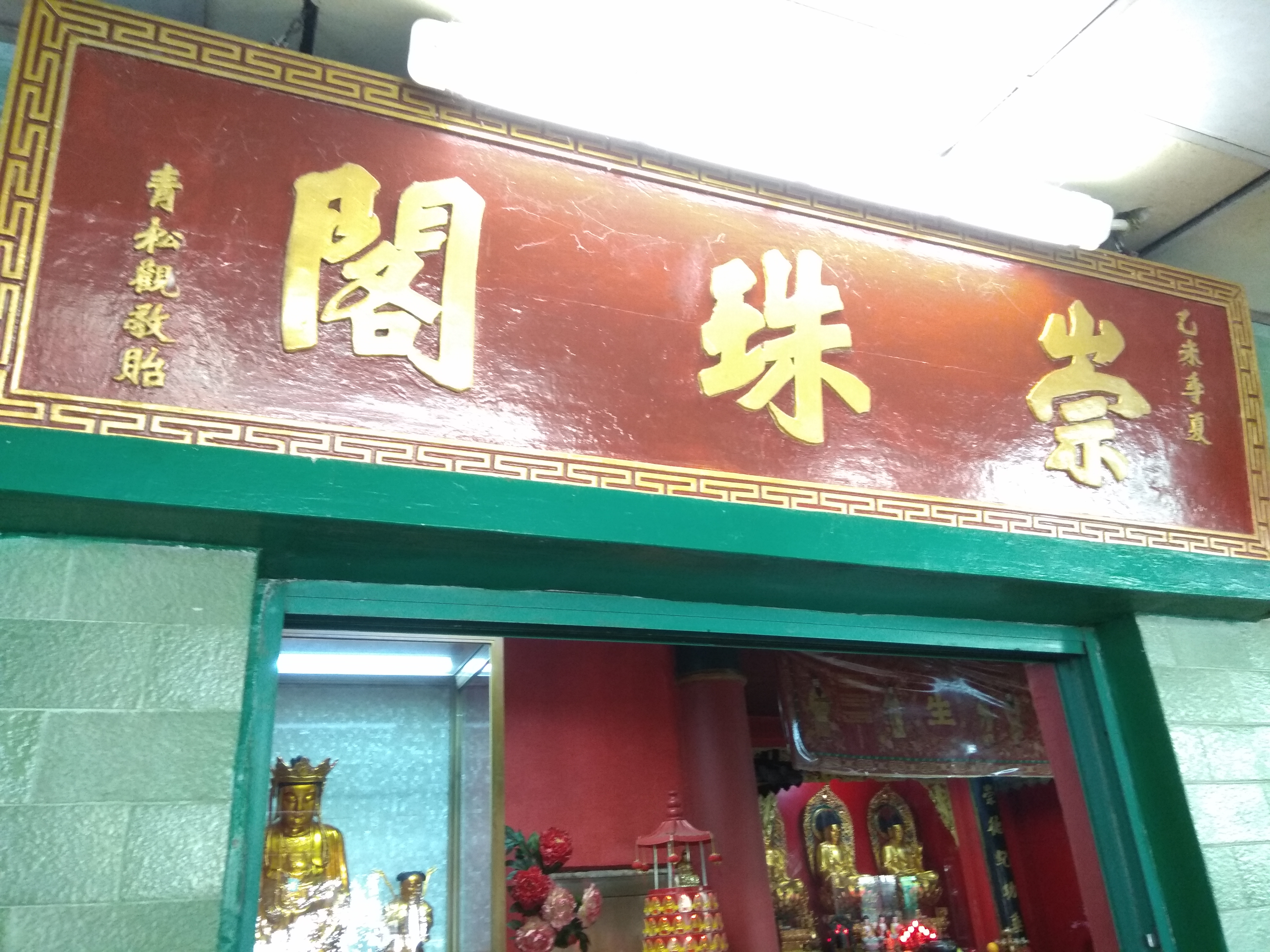
Plaque of Chun Chu Temple
