= Kai Yuen Street =

Street in North Point, Hong Kong, that goes up Kai Yuen Hill

Coordinates: 22.290187°N 114.203286°E

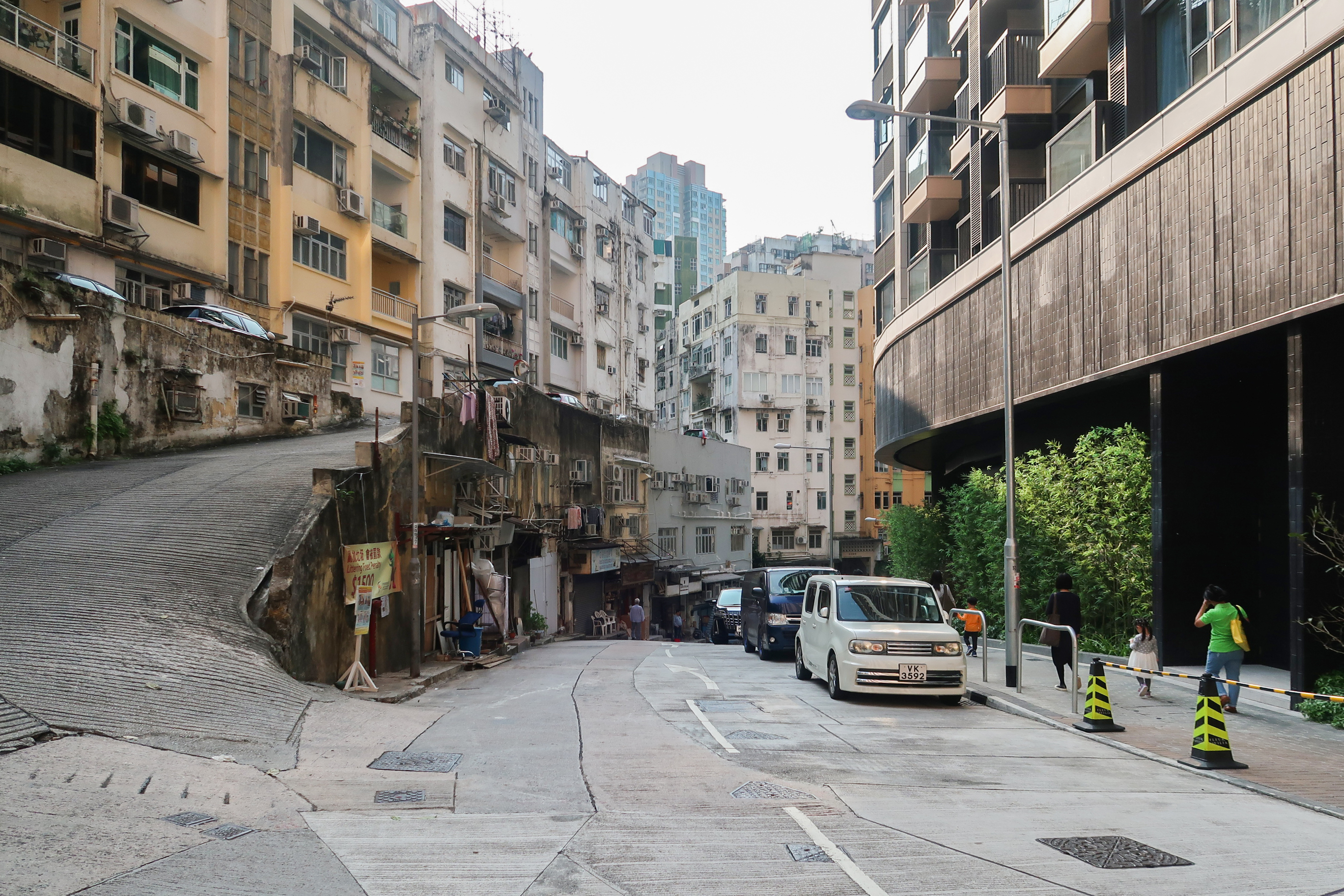
- Looking downhill from Kai Yuen Street, with Fleur Pavilla to the right, and Mid-century tenement buildings to the left.
- Interactive map of Kai Yuen Street
- Native name: 繼園街 (Yue Chinese)
- Namesake: Kai Yuen (mansion)
- Location: Eastern District, Hong Kong Island, Hong Kong

Construction
- Completion: circa 1930s

Kai Yuen Street (Chinese: 繼園街) is a street in North Point, Hong Kong, that goes up Kai Yuen Hill. It is a historically rich street, once serving as the main access road to Kai Yuen, the influential Chan Wai Chow (陳維周) family's mansion. Kai Yuen was demolished in the late 1970s.

Currently it is mainly a residential area with high rise apartments such as Bedford Gardens on the west side, and 5–7-storey Mid-Century apartments on the east side.

== History ==
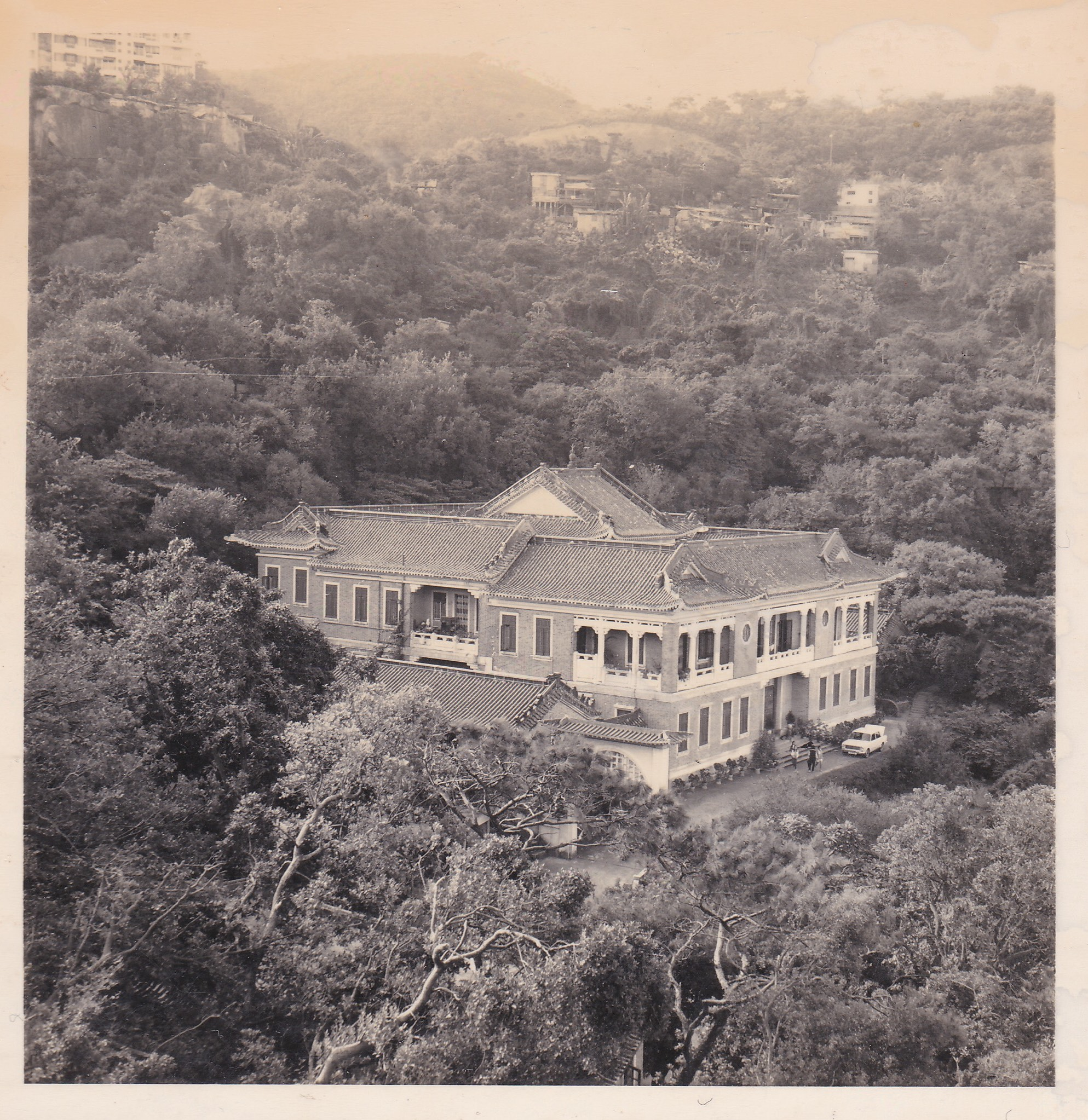
Kai Yuen in 1970.

=== Origins ===
The surrounding area was named after the mansion 'Kai Yuen', a Chinese Renaissance-style mansion constructed in 1938 and one of the largest of its kind in Hong Kong. It was once the residence of the Chan Wai Chow (陳維周) family, a family of warlords originating from Guangdong. Chan Wai Chow's brother was Chan Kai Tong, the famous general and governor of Guangdong.

After settling in Kai Yuen, Chan Wai Chow started to establish businesses such as hotels and cinemas in Hong Kong. Some of Chan Wai Chow's soldiers also settled in the area and established a variety of small shops and businesses.

=== 1945–1980 – prosperity and first developments ===
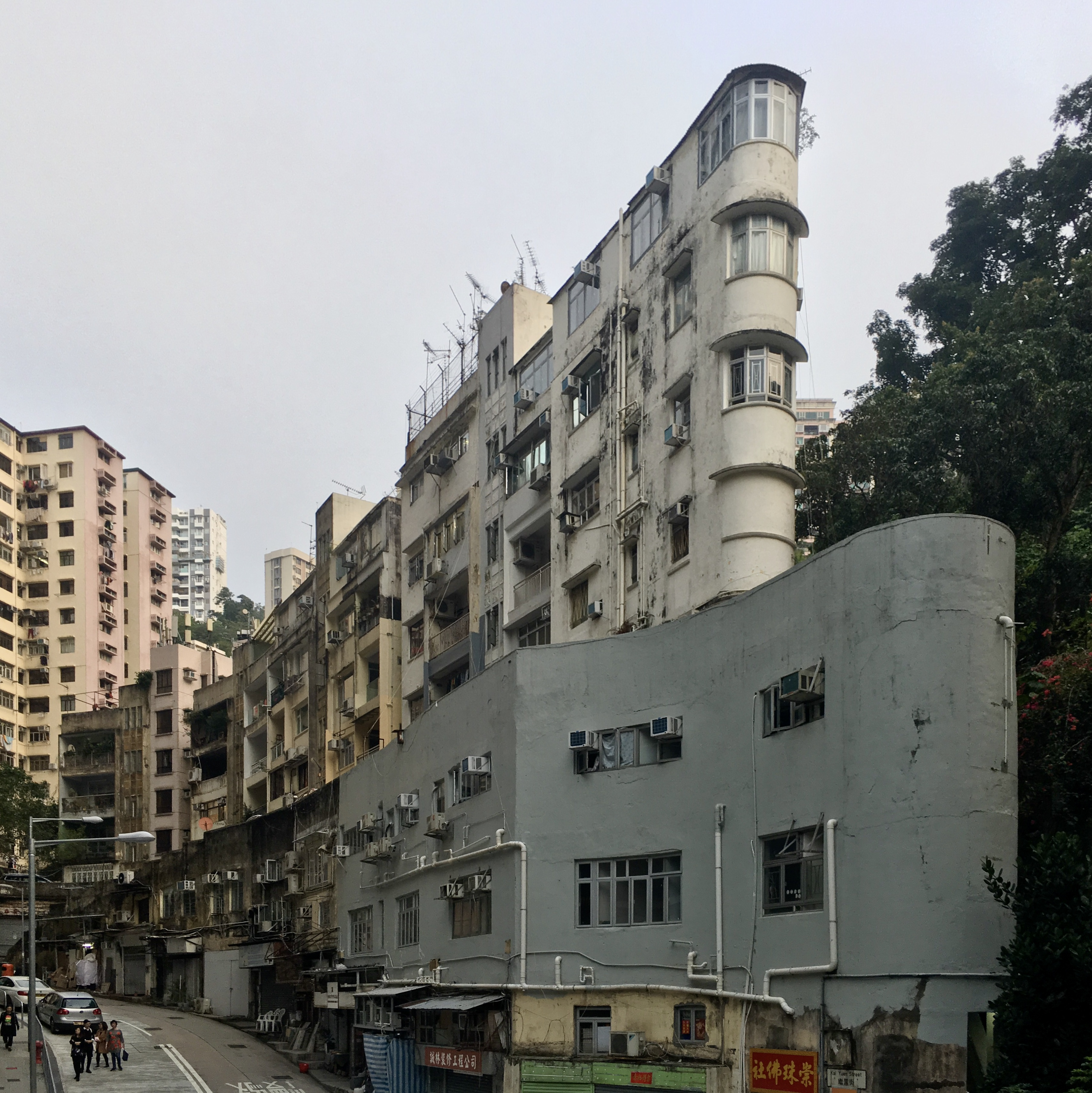
Tenement buildings designed by Yum Koon Seng, built during the 1960s.

After the end of the Japanese occupation of Hong Kong in World War II, North Point saw a boom in immigrants from Shanghai, Fujian, and the Philippines, causing a large demand for new buildings to be built. The period of the 1950s to the 1970s saw a variety of new developments in the Kai Yuen area, such as the construction of Chun Chu Temple, a Buddhist and Taoist temple founded in 1955 by a community of Hakka and Hainan people in North Point, as well as a batch of tenement buildings for residential and commercial purposes designed by Yum Koon Seng (Chinese: 任冠生), a prominent architect most known for designing luxury apartments at the time.

=== Post-1980 – demolition and redevelopment ===
During the late 1970s, the last owners of Kai Yuen sold the mansion to developers, who promptly demolished it to redevelop the land into a private housing estate. Kai Yuen was replaced by Bedford Gardens in 1981, a large residential development with 12 building blocks.

Subsequently, tong laus (tenement housing) in Kai Yuen upper and Lower lane, as well as Kai Yuen Street No. 60–74 were demolished in 2011 and 2021 respectively. To be developed into high rise residential apartments.

== Kai Yuen Terrace ==
Kai Yuen Terrace (Chinese: 繼園臺) is a short, sloped cul-de-sac road that starts from the northern end of Kai Yuen Street. It is the main access route to private housing estates including Full Wealth Gardens, Kings Way Mansion, and Harbour Court.

Kai Yuen Terrace used to be the access road to the North Point branch of Yan Pak English Secondary School (仁伯英文書院). The school was founded by Seaker S.K. Chan (陳樹渠), the son of Chan Wai Chow.

== Kai Yuen Upper and Lower Lane ==
Kai Yuen Upper and Lower Lane were two cul-de-sac streets connecting Kai Yuen Street that had rows of tong lau (tenement housing), including Kai Yuen Lau (繼園樓) and Fu On Lau (福安樓), which were built during the late 1950s. Both lanes were purchased by Stewart Leung Chi-kin (梁志堅) of New World China Land in 2010, and demolished in 2010–2011 for redevelopment. Currently, Fleur Pavilla stands on the original site.

The author and scholar Sima Cheung Fung (司馬長風) once lived in Kai Yuen Upper Lane during the 1970s.

== Features ==
- No. 1: Fleur Pavilia (Chinese: 柏蔚山), a private housing estate containing three 35-storey high rise apartment blocks, opened in 2018. It stands on the site of former Upper and Lower Kai Yuen Lane.
- No. 1B: Chun Chu Temple, a Buddhist and Taoist temple founded in 1955 by a community of Hakka and Hainan people in North Point. It is thought to be affiliated with Kai Yuen and the Chan Wai Chow (陳維周) family.
- No. 12–14, 24–26: two 6-storey tenement buildings built in 1958, featuring auspicious 9 squared grid windows at the stairwell.
- No. 60–74: One batch of tenement buildings designed by Yum Koon Seng during the 1960s. It features a unique curved perimeter and is also nicknamed as a 'fortress'. It was demolished in 2021 for redevelopment.

== Notable people ==
- Chan Wai Chow (陳維周): Politician and businessman. During 1929–1936, he was the salt commissioner of Guangdong and Guangxi, and the director of the Nonsmoking Bureau. He and his family were the original owners of Kai Yuen. He died in Kai Yuen Mansion in 1966.
- Eleen Chang: Chinese-American essayist, novelist, and screenwriter. She lived around No.400 Kings Road, North Point during the 1950s. (Note: Some people believe that Eleen Chang lived in Feiloon Terrace (輝濃臺) during the 1950s. But in an interview Roland Soong recalled that she lived around Kings Road and not in Kai Yuen Street.) Roland Soong (宋以朗) the son of Stephen Soong (宋淇) and Cheng Man Mei (鄺文美), recalls that Eleen Chang was very close to his family, and used to visit their residence at No.1 Kai Yuen Street very often. He is now the keeper of Eleen Chang's Inherited items, helping to publish her work posthumously.
- Sima Cheung Fung (司馬長風): Author and scholar. He lived in Kai Yuen Upper Lane during the 1970s.
- Stephen Soong (宋淇): Author, critic, translator, and film production manager. During 1968–1996 he was hired by the Chinese University of Hong Kong as special assistant to the Vice-Chancellor and director at the Research Centre for Translation. He and his family lived in Kai Yuen Street No.1 during the 1950s.
- Meng Xiaodong: Shanghai actress of Peking opera. In 1964 she lived in Kai Yuen for 3 years before moving to Taiwan.

== In the arts and popular culture ==
Several scenes in the 2004 thriller A-1 Headline (A-1頭條) features Kai Yuen Street and some tenement buildings designed by Yum Koon Seng.

The 2019 animated film No.7 Cherry Lane (繼園臺七號) by Yonfan takes its name from Kai Yuen Terrace, inspired by the ethereal atmosphere surrounding Kai Yuen during the 1960s.
