= Rural committee =

Rural committees (Chinese: 鄉事委員會) are bodies representing the welfare of indigenous residents in the New Territories of Hong Kong. The chairman of each rural committee is the representative in the Heung Yee Kuk, and is ex officio member of a district council.

== Overview ==
There are now 27 rural committees in total, thereby forming the Heung Yee Kuk. Rural representative elections are held every four years, electing the village representatives and kaifong representatives of the rural committees. The composition of the rural committees are not statutorily regulated, even unelected villagers could become chairpersons of the rural committees.

== List of rural committees ==
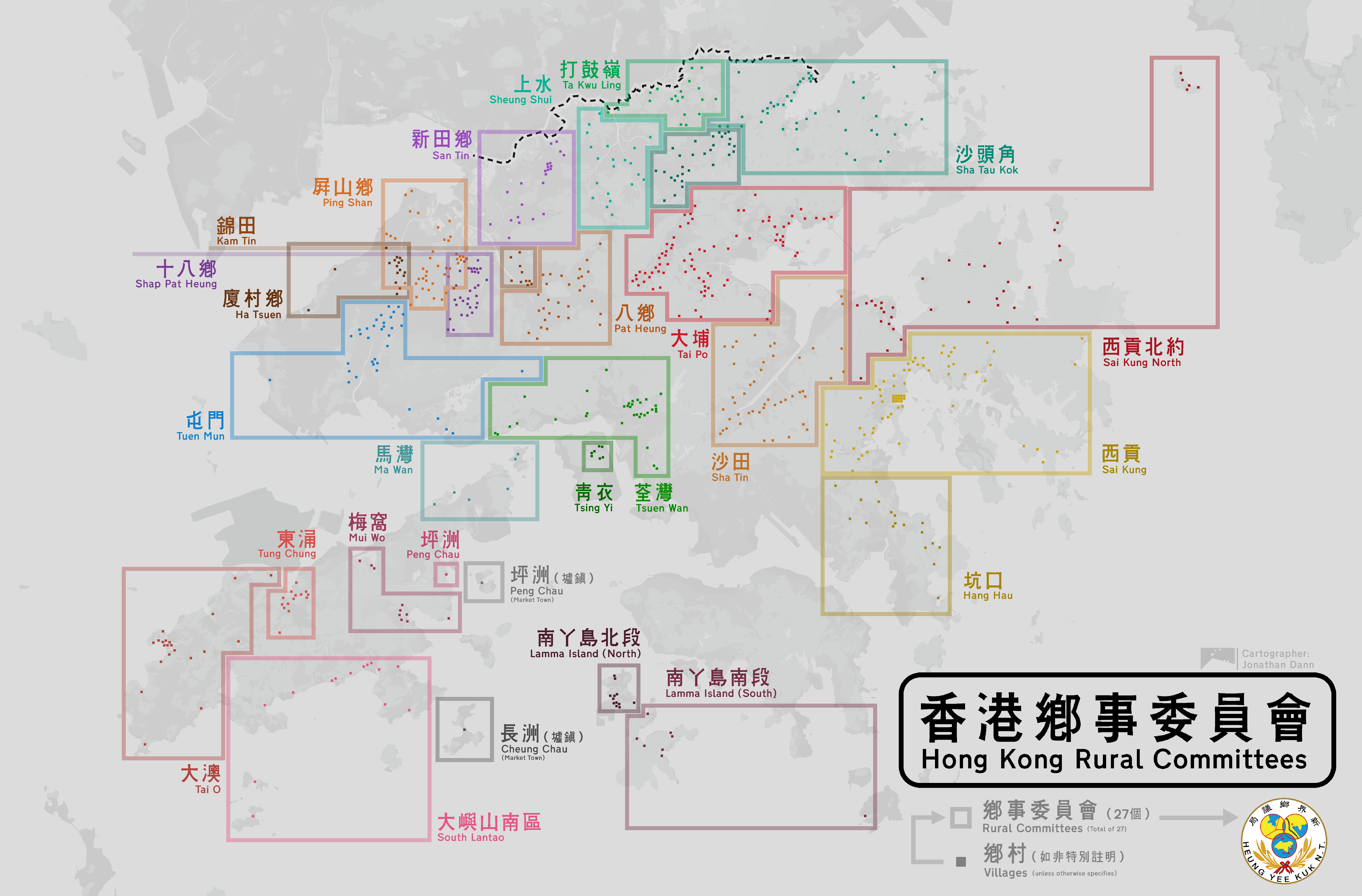
Map of rural committees

District	Rural committees		Village/Town
Islands	Cheung Chau	長洲	1
Islands	Lamma Island (North)	南丫島北段	12
Islands	Lamma Island (South)	南丫島南段	8
Islands	Mui Wo	梅窩	10
Islands	Peng Chau	坪洲	2
Islands	South Lantau	大嶼山南區	14
Islands	Tai O	大澳	21
Islands	Tung Chung	東涌	14
Kwai Tsing	Tsing Yi	青衣	7
Kwai Tsing; Tsuen Wan	Tsuen Wan	荃灣	31
Tsuen Wan	Ma Wan	馬灣	6
Tuen Mun	Tuen Mun	屯門	35
Yuen Long	Ha Tsuen	厦村鄉	17
Yuen Long	Kam Tin	錦田	10
Yuen Long	Pat Heung	八鄉	30
Yuen Long	Ping Shan	屏山鄉	41
Yuen Long	San Tin	新田鄉	23
Yuen Long	Shap Pat Heung	十八鄉	34
North	Fanling District	粉嶺區	30
North	Sha Tau Kok District	沙頭角區	46
North	Sheung Shui District	上水區	21
North	Ta Kwu Ling District	打鼓嶺區	20
Tai Po	Tai Po	大埔	83
Tai Po	Sai Kung North	西貢北約	39
Sha Tin	Sha Tin	沙田	48
Sai Kung	Hang Hau	坑口	18
Sai Kung	Sai Kung	西貢區	73
Total			697

== See also ==
- Rural Representative elections
