= Cheung Chau (constituency) =

- Elected constituency for the Islands District Council
- Boundary of Cheung Chau in Islands District
- District: Islands
- Legislative Council constituency: Hong Kong Island West
- Population: 21,752 (2019)
- Electorate: 12,561 (2019)

Current constituency
- Created: 2019
- Number of members: One
- Member: vacant
- Created from: Cheung Chau North, Cheung Chau South

Cheung Chau (Chinese: 長洲) is one of the 10 constituencies in the Islands District.

Merging Cheung Chau South and Cheung Chau North for the 2019 District Council elections, the constituency returns one district councillor to the Islands District Council, with an election every four years.

Cheung Chau covers the whole island of Cheung Chau. It has projected population of 20,712.

== Councillors represented ==
Election	Member	Party
2019	Leung Kwok-ho→vacant	Nonpartisan

== Election results ==
=== 2010s ===
Islands District Council Election, 2019: Cheung Chau
Party	Candidate	Votes	%	±%
Nonpartisan	Leung Kwok-ho	5,142	61.40	
DAB	Mealoha Kwok Wai-man	3,233	38.60	
Majority		1,909	22.80	
Turnout		8,424	67.10	
Nonpartisan win (new seat)				
