= Kwok Cheuk-kin =

- 郭卓堅
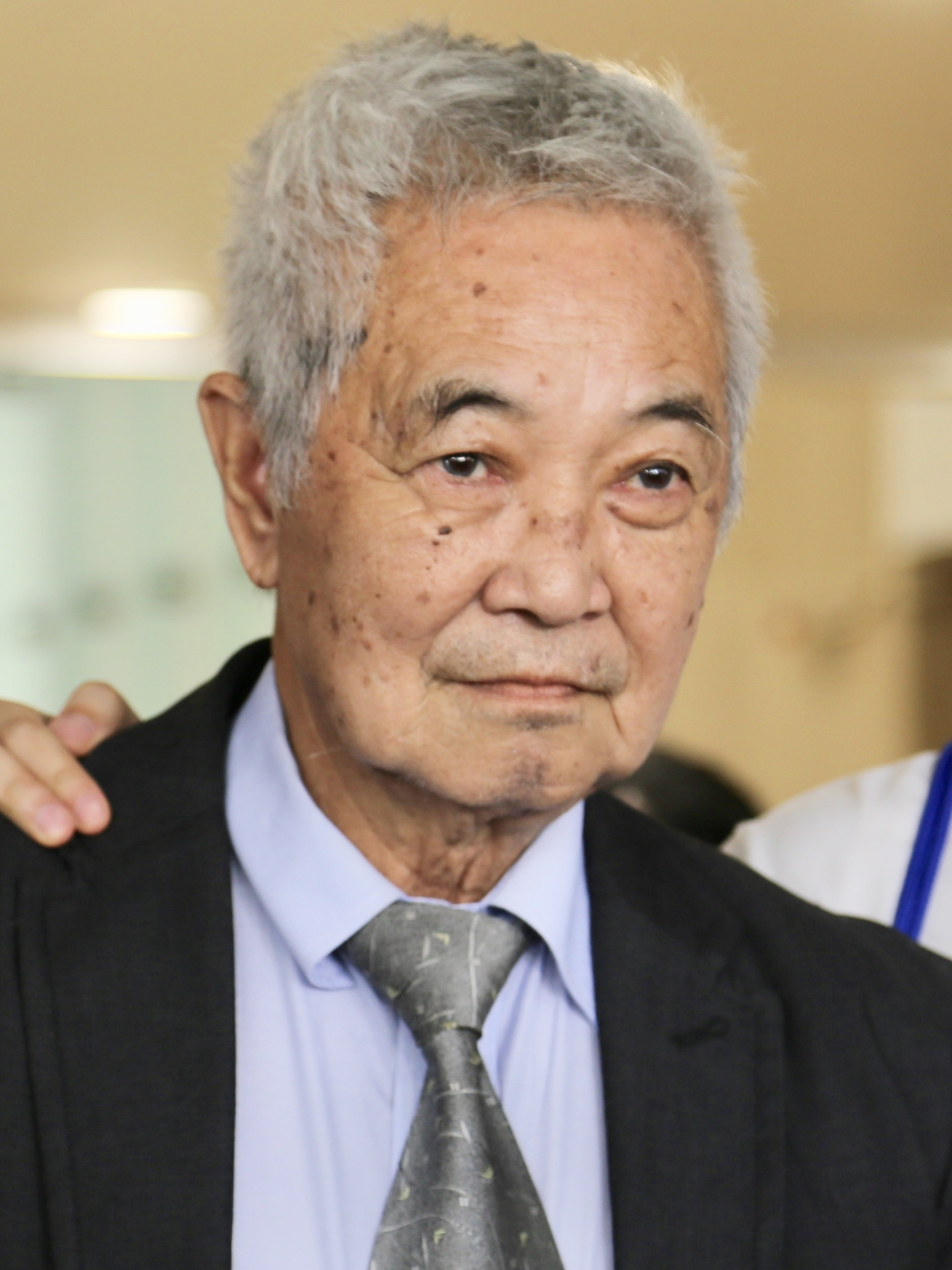
- Kwok in 2019 outside court
- Born: 29 April 1940 (age 86); British Hong Kong
- Other name: King of Judicial Reviews
- Education: National Taiwan University (LLB)
- Political party: Democratic Party
- Website: Kwok Cheuk-kin on Facebook

Kwok Cheuk-kin
- Traditional Chinese: 郭卓堅
- Simplified Chinese: 郭卓坚
Transcriptions
Standard Mandarin
- Hanyu Pinyin: Guō Zhuójiān
Yue: Cantonese
- Jyutping: gwok3 coek3 gin1

Kwok Cheuk-kin (Chinese: 郭卓堅, born 29 April 1940) is a Hong Kong retired civil servant and judicial activist who earned the nickname of "King of Judicial Reviews" for having filed dozens of judicial reviews against the government in 17 years.

== Early life ==
Kwok's father was an officer in the National Revolutionary Army of the Republic of China. Kwok stayed in Chungking during the Japanese occupation of Hong Kong, and returned after Japan surrendered in 1945. After studying in Shau Kei Wan for primary school and at Catholic Ming Yuen Secondary School in Rennie's Mill, Kwok went to National Taiwan University and graduated with Bachelor of Laws. Kwok then worked in Hong Kong's judiciary.

In 1989, Kwok travelled to Beijing to support the pro-democracy movement, but was arrested in Beijing on 7 June after the bloody crackdown, later detained in Shanghai for a year. According to Kwok, he was given the British nationality following recommendation by the Hong Kong Government, which also advised him to leave Hong Kong. Kwok, however, said he hasn't thought of migration, instead moved to Bela Vista Villa of outlying island Cheung Chau for retirement in 1996.

== Judicial activism ==
Aiming to strive for justice and fight for Cheung Chau residents, Kwok applied his first judicial review (JR) in 2006 against the approval by Transport Department for fare hike of Cheung Chau ferry route. He then applied JR over incineration plant project on Shek Kwu Chau, illegal hillside burial on Cheung Chau, and other Cheung Chau-related issues. In 2015 Kwok succeeded in challenging Cheung Chau unlicensed funeral parlour. Kwok then expanded the scope on JR to city-wide with government's legal aid services.

In 2017 Kwok said he believed Hong Kong no longer enjoyed rule of law and is planning to migrate to Britain. The same year Kwok was barred from applying for legal aid over the next three years, after the authorities considered his conduct amounted to an abuse of the legal aid system. However Kwok eventually stayed and continued his activism. In 2020, he was declared bankrupt after losing the JR related to Polytechnic University siege. This, however, did not stop him from challenging government's decisions. In 2022, he achieved his second success after the High Court ruled the Hong Kong government does not have the power to void more than 20,000 COVID-19 vaccination exemption certificates issued by doctors allegedly handed them out without conducting proper medical consultation, despite the verdict was effectively overturned by the government days later.

Kwok, a formal member of Democratic Party, has been under attack from Beijing mouthpieces, accused by Ta Kung Pao of colluding with "anti-China" pro-democracy camp. After sixteen years with over 60 filings of judicial review but winning less than 10 of those, Kwok revealed his intention to end his activism under fear of crackdown and arrest by authorities.

== Issues ==
Notable city-wide issues Kwok has challenged in court included:

- 2012-16: "Leapfrog" mechanism for Legislative Council
- 2013: Denial of HKTV's television license application
- 2014: Political reform "inaccurate" consultation report
- 2015-21: Ding rights
- 2015: ViuTV's succession of ATV's broadcasting spectrum
- 2015: Lead in Drinking Water Incidents
- 2016: Dual nationality of President-elect Andrew Leung of Legislative Council
- 2016, 18, 19: Disqualification of multiple pro-independence and localist candidates
- 2016: Oath-taking controversies over unseating of pro-democracy MPs and "erroneous" oaths by pro-Beijing MPs and Chief Executive
- 2017, 18: Prosecution in Donald Tsang's and Leung Chun-ying's graft probe
- 2018-19: Co-location arrangement of Express Rail Link
- 2019: Identification of police on duty during protests
- 2020: "Interference" by Chinese Hong Kong Liaison Office in parliament affairs
- 2020: Promulgation of Hong Kong national security law
- 2021: Mandatory use of LeaveHomeSafe
- 2022: Invalidation of COVID-19 vaccination exemption certificates
- 2023: Suffrage under 2023 Hong Kong electoral changes

== Electoral performance ==
Islands District Council Election, 2011: Cheung Chau South
Party	Candidate	Votes	%	±%
Economic Synergy	Ken Kwong Koon-wan	1,320	45.83	+13.16
Independent	Rico Lo Wan-kai	634	22.01	
Democratic	Kwok Cheuk-kin	516	17.92	+7.86
Independent	Anil Kwong Sai-loi	376	13.06	
Independent	Stephen Sze Hou-ming	34	1.18	
Majority		686	39.49	
Turnout		2,880	46.69	
Economic Synergy gain from Independent		Swing		

Islands District Council Election, 2007: Cheung Chau South
Party	Candidate	Votes	%	±%
Independent	Kwong Kwoi-wai	1,327	54.05	
Independent	Kwong Koon-wan	802	32.67	
Independent	Kwok Cheuk-kin	247	10.06	
Independent	Stephen Sze Hou-ming	64	2.61	
Civic	Leung Hon-wai	15	0.61	
Majority		525	21.38	
Independent hold		Swing		
