= Cheung Chau South (constituency) =

- Former Elected constituency for the Islands District Council
- District: Islands
- Legislative Council constituency: New Territories West
- Population: 11,108 (2015)
- Electorate: 6,189 (2015)

Former constituency
- Created: 1994
- Abolished: 2019
- Number of members: One
- Member: Kwong Koon-wan (Nonpartisan) (last)
- Replaced by: Cheung Chau

Cheung Chau South was one of the constituencies in the Islands District in the New Territories, Hong Kong.

The constituency returned one district councillor to the Islands District Council, with an election every four years.

Cheung Chau South constituency was loosely based on the southern part of the island of Cheung Chau with an estimated population of 11,108.

== Councillors represented ==
Election	Member	Party
1994	Kwong Kwok-wai	Independent
2011	Ken Kwong Koon-wan	Economic Synergy
2012	Ken Kwong Koon-wan	BPA
2017	Ken Kwong Koon-wan	Independent
2019	Constituency abolished	

== Election results ==
=== 2010s ===
Islands District Council Election, 2015: Cheung Chau South
Party	Candidate	Votes	%	±%
BPA	Ken Kwong Koon-wan	1,487	53.39	+7.56
Independent	Super Leung Kwok-ho	838	30.09	
Independent	Lam Kit-sing	460	16.52	
Majority		378	13.57	
Turnout		2,785	45.00	
BPA hold		Swing		

Islands District Council Election, 2011: Cheung Chau South
Party	Candidate	Votes	%	±%
Economic Synergy	Ken Kwong Koon-wan	1,320	45.83	+13.16
Independent	Rico Lo Wan-kai	634	22.01	
Democratic	Kwok Cheuk-kin	516	17.92	+7.86
Independent	Anil Kwong Sai-loi	376	13.06	
Independent	Stephen Sze Hou-ming	34	1.18	
Majority		686	39.49	
Turnout		2,880	46.69	
Economic Synergy gain from Independent		Swing		

=== 2000s ===
Islands District Council Election, 2007: Cheung Chau South
Party	Candidate	Votes	%	±%
Independent	Kwong Kwoi-wai	1,327	54.05	
Independent	Kwong Koon-wan	802	32.67	
Independent	Kwok Cheuk-kin	247	10.06	
Independent	Stephen Sze Hou-ming	64	2.61	
Civic	Leung Hon-wai	15	0.61	
Majority		525	21.38	
Independent hold		Swing		

Islands District Council Election, 2003: Cheung Chau South
Party	Candidate	Votes	%	±%
Independent	Kwong Kwoi-wai	uncontested		
Independent hold		Swing		

=== 1990s ===
Islands District Council Election, 1999: Cheung Chau South
Party	Candidate	Votes	%	±%
Independent	Kwong Kwoi-wai	uncontested		
Independent hold		Swing		

Islands District Board Election, 1994: Cheung Chau South
Party	Candidate	Votes	%	±%
Independent	Kwong Kwoi-wai	1,824	51.41	
DAB	Lee Kwai-chun	1,718	48.59	
Majority		106	2.82	
Independent win (new seat)				
