= Cheung Chau North (constituency) =

- Former Elected constituency for the Islands District Council
- District: Islands
- Legislative Council constituency: New Territories West
- Population: 11,108 (2015)
- Electorate: 5,714 (2015)

Former constituency
- Created: 1982
- Abolished: 2019
- Number of members: One
- Member(s): Lee Kwai-chun (DAB) (last)
- Replaced by: Cheung Chau

Cheung Chau North was one of the constituencies in the Islands District in Hong Kong.

The constituency returns one district councillor to the Islands District Council, with an election every four years. The seat is currently held by Lee Kwai-chun of the Democratic Alliance for the Betterment and Progress of Hong Kong.

Cheung Chau North constituency is loosely based on the northern part of the island of Cheung Chau with an estimated population of 11,082.

== Councillors represented ==
Election	Member	Party
1982	Fung Tsz-kan	Nonpartisan
1994	Lam Kit-sing	DAB
1999	Lee Kwai-chun	DAB
2019	Constituency abolished	

== Election results ==
=== 2010s ===
Islands District Council Election, 2015: Cheung Chau North
Party	Candidate	Votes	%	±%
DAB	Lee Kwai-chun	1,681	77.79	
Nonpartisan	Kwong Wai-kuen	480	22.21	
Majority		2,127	86.42	
DAB hold		Swing		

Islands District Council Election, 2011: Cheung Chau North
Party	Candidate	Votes	%	±%
DAB	Lee Kwai-chun	uncontested		
DAB hold		Swing		

=== 2000s ===
Islands District Council Election, 2007: Cheung Chau North
Party	Candidate	Votes	%	±%
DAB	Lee Kwai-chun	2,294	93.21	
Nonpartisan	Lau Chun-kwok	167	6.79	
Majority		2,127	86.42	
DAB hold		Swing		

Islands District Council Election, 2003: Cheung Chau North
Party	Candidate	Votes	%	±%
DAB	Lee Kwai-chun	uncontested		
DAB hold		Swing		

=== 1990s ===
Islands District Council Election, 1999: Cheung Chau North
Party	Candidate	Votes	%	±%
DAB	Lee Kwai-chun	uncontested		
DAB hold		Swing		

Islands District Board Election, 1994: Cheung Chau North
Party	Candidate	Votes	%	±%
DAB	Lam Kit-sing	1,330	41.42	+5.68
Nonpartisan	Fung Tsz-kan	1,316	40.98	−5.28
Nonpartisan	Kwok Chuen	565	17.80	
Majority		14	5.48	
DAB gain from Nonpartisan		Swing		

Islands District Board Election, 1991: Cheung Chau North
Party	Candidate	Votes	%	±%
Nonpartisan	Fung Tsz-kan	1,113	46.26	
Nonpartisan	Lam Kit-sing	860	35.74	
Nonpartisan	Lee Kin-ting	433	17.80	
Majority		253	10.52	
Nonpartisan hold		Swing		

=== 1980s ===
Islands District Board Election, 1988: Cheung Chau North
Party	Candidate	Votes	%	±%
Nonpartisan	Fung Tsz-kan	uncontested		
Nonpartisan hold		Swing		

Islands District Board Election, 1985: Cheung Chau North
Party	Candidate	Votes	%	±%
Nonpartisan	Fung Tsz-kan	963	49.49	+14.56
Nonpartisan	Leung Fu-on	745	38.28	+3.56
Nonpartisan	Kwok Tai-fook	238	12.23	−5.52
Majority		218	11.21	
Nonpartisan hold		Swing		

Islands District Board Election, 1982: Cheung Chau North
Party	Candidate	Votes	%	±%
Nonpartisan	Fung Tsz-kan	626	34.93	
Nonpartisan	Leung Fu-on	624	34.82	
Nonpartisan	Kwok Tai-fook	318	17.75	
Nonpartisan	Ng Kau	224	12.50	
Majority		2	0.11	
Nonpartisan win (new seat)				
