= Kaifong associations =

Traditional mutual aid organizations in Hong Kong

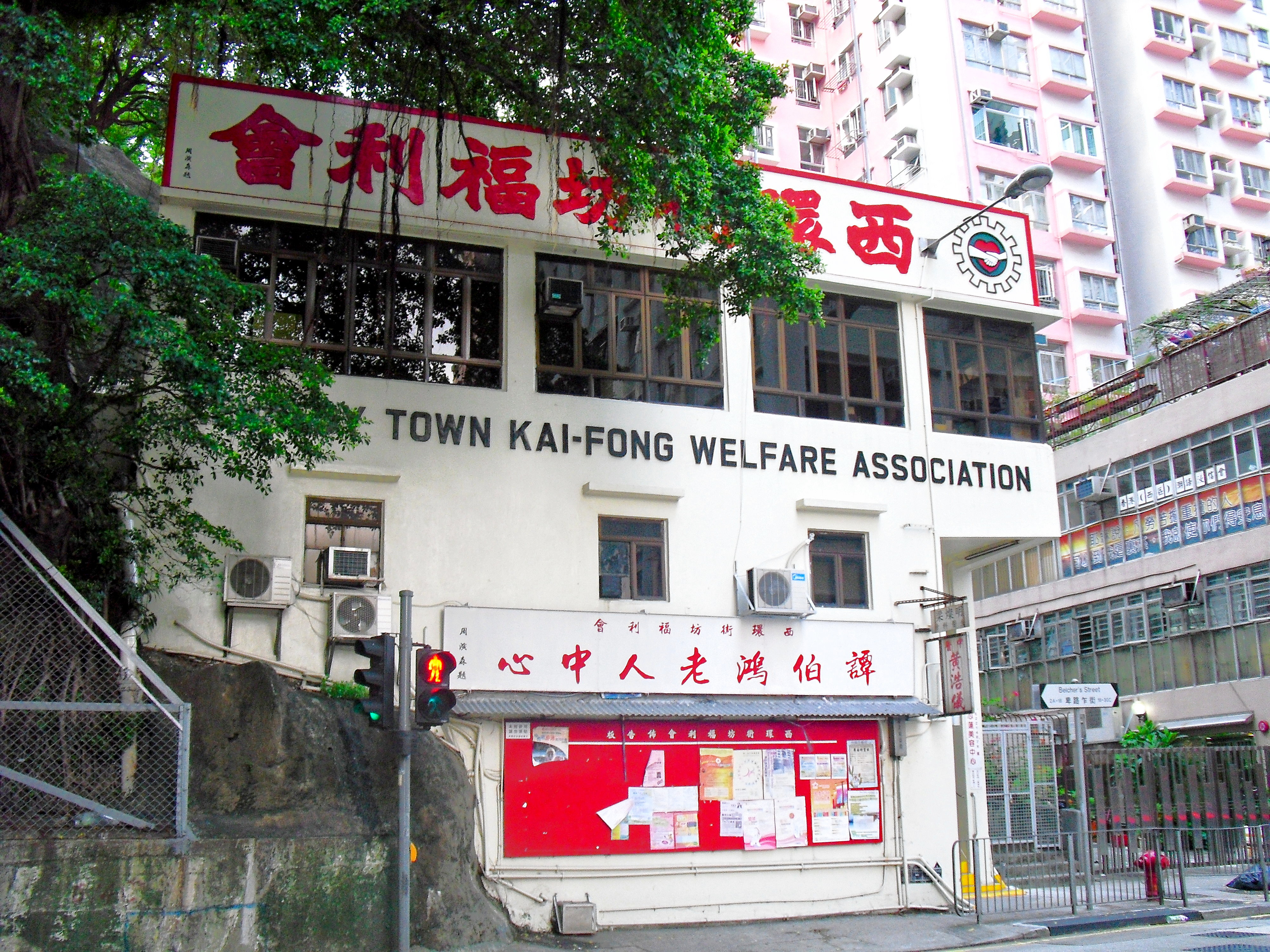
Kennedy Town Kai-Fong Welfare Association.

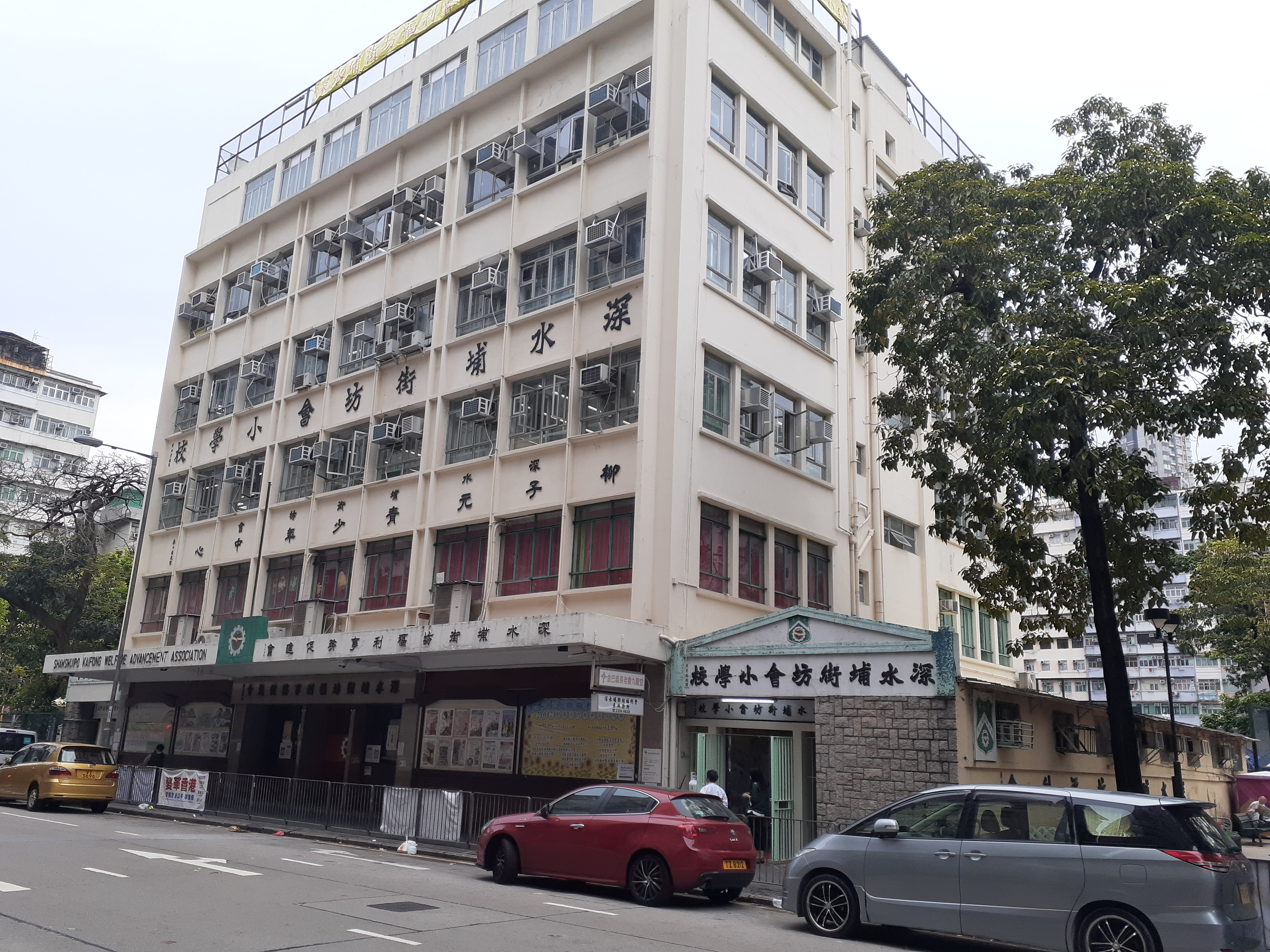
Shamshuipo Kaifong Welfare Advancement Association.

Kaifong associations (Chinese: 街坊會; Jyutping: gaai1 fong1 wui6) or kaifong welfare associations (街坊福利會; gaai1 fong1 fuk1 lei6 wui6) are traditional mutual aid organisations which emerged in Hong Kong after the Second World War. They were set up with the help of the Secretariat for Chinese Affairs, particularly the Society Welfare Council, of the British colonial government, which had the intention of developing non-governmental civil society for the purpose of promoting moderate politics among the general public. The term kaifong is a Cantonese romanisation of the Chinese 街坊, which means people living in the same neighbourhood, and kaifong associations mainly aim at serving the residents of specific neighbourhoods.

The main purpose was to provide low cost or free services in areas such as education and health care for the many refugees from China. By early 1954, there were twenty-one; by 1958, twenty-eight. After 1958, the government tried to use the kaifong associations to communicate with the local population. In 1960, kaifong associations extended their services to areas such as legal support or environmental protection.

After the introduction of the District Offices in 1969, the importance of kaifong associations declined. Nevertheless, many kaifong associations remain active today.

== List ==
- Aberdeen Kai-fong Welfare Association
- Chai Wan Resettlement Kaifong Welfare Association
- Cheung Sha Wan Kaifong Welfare Association
- Chuk Yuen Cottage Area Kaifong Welfare Advancement Committee
- Kowloon Walled City Kaifong Welfare Promotion Association
- Mongkok Kaifong Association
- Sham Shui Po Kaifong Welfare Advancement Association
- Tai Hang Sai Kaifong Welfare Association
- Tsim Sha Tsui Kaifong Welfare Association
- Wang Tau Hom Resettlement Kaifong Welfare Association
- Yaumati Kaifong Welfare Advancement Association

== See also ==
- Rural committees/Rural Representative elections(Organization sharing similar duties in New Territories part of Hong Kong)
- Neighborhood association
