= Foreign relations of Cuba =

Cuba's foreign policy has been highly dynamic depending on world events throughout Latin America and the Caribbean. Cuban foreign policy is impacted by the various spheres of influence and economic development of neighboring countries. During the 1980s, its geopolitical alignment with the Soviet Union isolated Cuba on the international stage. The fall of the Soviet Union, end of the Cold War, and emergence of Russia as a key trading partner led to limited regional relations. Cuba began to establish bilateral relations with South American countries during the late-1990s, mainly with Venezuela and Bolivia. Cuba has a cold relationship with the United States, with a variety of bilateral issues due to historic conflict and divergent political ideologies. It has a similarly strained relationship with the European Union (EU) due to Cuba's human rights policies. Since the late-2010s, Cuba has developed closer ties to Venezuela, Russia, and China.

Cuba provided civilian assistance workers – principally medical – to more than 20 countries as medical diplomacy. More than one million exiles have escaped to foreign countries. Cuba is slated to be a part of the United Nations Human Rights Council from 2024 to 2026 despite Human rights in Cuba. It is a founding member of the Bolivarian Alternative for the Americas, a member of the Community of Latin American and Caribbean States, the Latin American Integration Association and the United Nations. Cuba is a member of the Non-Aligned Movement and hosted its September 2006 summit. In addition as a member of the Association of Caribbean States (ACS), Cuba was re-appointed as the chair of the special committee on transportation issues for the Caribbean region. Since November 2004, several leaders of South America have attempted to make Cuba either a full or associate member of the South American trade bloc known as Mercosur. Cuba's present foreign minister is Bruno Rodríguez Parrilla.

== History ==
=== 1917 ===
In 1917, Cuba entered World War I on the side of the allies.

=== The Cold War ===
Following the establishment of diplomatic ties to the Soviet Union, and after the Cuban Missile Crisis, Cuba became increasingly dependent on Soviet markets and military and economic aid. Castro was able to build a formidable military force with the help of Soviet equipment and military advisors. The KGB kept in close touch with Havana, and Castro tightened Communist Party control over all levels of government, the media, and the educational system, while developing a Soviet-style internal police force.

Castro's alliance with the Soviet Union caused something of a split between him and Guevara. In 1966, Guevara left for Bolivia in an ill-fated attempt to stir up revolution against the country's government.

On August 23, 1968, Castro made a public gesture to the USSR that caused the Soviet leadership to reaffirm their support for him. Two days after Warsaw Pact invasion of Czechoslovakia to repress the Prague Spring, Castro took to the airwaves and publicly denounced the Czech rebellion. Castro warned the Cuban people about the Czechoslovak 'counterrevolutionaries', who "were moving Czechoslovakia towards capitalism and into the arms of imperialists". He called the leaders of the rebellion "the agents of West Germany and fascist reactionary rabble."

==== Relations in Latin America during the Cold War ====
"Cuba has a unique symbolic allure. It is the small country that confronted the U.S. empire and has survived despite the attempts by all U.S. presidents since to subdue its communist government. It is the island with iconic leaders like Fidel Castro and Che Guevara, and the Latin American country that in the language of revolutionaries everywhere embodies the struggle of socialist humanism against the materialism of capitalist societies. Cuba is also the small nation that in the past sent its troops to die in faraway lands in Latin America and even Africa fighting for the poor."

— Moisés Naím, Newsweek

During the Cold War, Cuba's influence in the Americas was inhibited by the Monroe Doctrine and the dominance of the United States. Despite this Fidel Castro became an influential figurehead for leftist groups in the region, extending support to Marxist Revolutionary movements throughout Latin America, most notably aiding the Sandinistas in overthrowing Somoza in Nicaragua in 1979. In 1971, Fidel Castro took a month-long visit to Chile. The visit, in which Castro participated actively in the internal politics of the country, holding massive rallies and giving public advice to Salvador Allende, was seen by those on the political right as proof to support their view that "The Chilean Way to Socialism" was an effort to put Chile on the same path as Cuba.

==== Intervention in Cold War conflicts ====
During the Cold War, Africa was a major target of Cuba's influence. Fidel Castro stated that Africa was chosen in part to represent Cuban solidarity with its own large population of African descent. Exporting Cuba's revolutionary tactics abroad increased its worldwide influence and reputation. Wolf Grabendorff states that "Most African states view Cuban intervention in Africa as help in achieving independence through self-help rather than as a step toward the type of dependence which would result from a similar commitment by the super-powers." Cuban Soldiers were sent to fight in the Simba rebellion in the DRC during the 1960s. Furthermore, by providing military aid Cuba won trading partners for the Soviet bloc and potential converts to Marxism.

Starting in the 1970s, Cuba's intervened in 17 African nations including three insurgencies. Cuba expanded military programs to Africa and the Middle East, sending military missions to Sierra Leone in 1972, South Yemen in 1973, Equatorial Guinea in 1973, and Somalia in 1974. It sent combat troops to Syria in 1973 to fight against Israel. Cuba was following the general Soviet policy of détente with the West, and secret discussions were opened with the United States about peaceful coexistence. They ended abruptly when Cuba sent combat troops to fight in Angola in 1975.

===== Intervention in Africa =====
On November 4, 1975, Castro ordered the deployment of Cuban troops to Angola to aid the Marxist MPLA against UNITA, which were supported by the People's Republic of China, United States, Israel, and South Africa (see: Cuba in Angola). After two months on their own, Moscow aided the Cuban mission with the USSR engaging in a massive airlift of Cuban forces into Angola. Both Cuban and South African forces withdrew in the late 1980s and Namibia was granted independence. The Angolan civil war would last until 2002. Nelson Mandela is said to have remarked "Cuban internationalists have done so much for African independence, freedom, and justice." Cuban troops were also sent to Marxist Ethiopia to assist Mengistu Haile Mariam's government in the Ogaden War with Somalia in 1977. Cuba sent troops along with the Soviet Union to aid the FRELIMO government against the Rhodesian and South African-backed RENAMO. Castro never disclosed the number of casualties in Soviet African wars, but one estimate is that 14,000 Cubans were killed in Cuban military actions abroad.

===== Intervention in Latin America =====
In addition, Castro extended support to Marxist Revolutionary movements throughout Latin America. The first of these interventions came in 1959 with the Cuban intervention in Panama, where the Panamanian diplomat Roberto Arias appealed to Castro for support for an uprising against Panama's government. The intervention ended in failure however. A similar intervention was attempted against the dictatorship of Rafael Trujillo to trigger a revolution in the Dominican Republic against his dictatorship but also ended in failure. The Cuban government would also provide support to anti-junta revolutionaries in Argentina, such as the People's Revolutionary Army (Argentina) and the Montoneros. While from 1961 onward, they also aided the Sandinistas in overthrowing the Somoza government in Nicaragua in 1979 supported the communist government in Grenada against the American invasion of 1983.

===== Leadership of non-aligned movement =====
In the 1970s, Fidel Castro made a major effort to assume a leadership role in the non-aligned movement, which include over 90 countries. Cuba's intervention in Angola other military advisory missions, economic and social programs were praised fellow non-aligned member. The 1976 world conference of the non-aligned Movement applauded Cuban internationalism, stating that it "assisted the people of Angola in frustrating the expansionist and colonialist strategy of South Africa's racist regime and its allies." The next non-aligned conference was held in Havana in 1979, and chaired by Castro, who became the de facto spokesman for the Movement. The conference in September 1979 marked the peak of Cuban global influence. The non-aligned nations had believed that Cuba was not aligned with the Soviet Union in the Cold War. However, in December 1979, the Soviet Union invaded Afghanistan, an active member of the non-aligned Movement. At the United Nations, non-aligned members voted 56 to 9, with 26 abstaining, to condemn the Soviet invasion. Cuba, however, was deeply in debt financially and politically to Moscow, and voted against the resolution. It lost its reputation as non-aligned in the Cold War. Castro, instead of becoming a spokesman for the Movement, became inactive, and in 1983, leadership passed to India, which had abstained on the UN vote. Cuba lost its bid to become a member of the United Nations Security Council. Cuba's ambitions for a role in global leadership had ended.

===== Social and economic programs =====
Cuba had social and economic programs in 40 developing countries. This was possible by a growing Cuban economy in the 1970s. The largest programs were construction projects, in which 8,000 Cubans provided technical advice, planning, and training of engineers. Educational programs involved 3,500 teachers. In addition thousands of specialists, technicians, and engineers were sent as advisors to agricultural mining and transportation sectors around the globe. Cuba also hosted 10,000 foreign students, mostly from Africa and Latin America, in health programs and technical schools. Cuba's extensive program of medical support to international attention. A 2007 study reported:

Since the early 1960s, 28,422 Cuban health workers have worked in 37 Latin American countries, 31,181 in 33 African countries, and 7,986 in 24 Asian countries. Throughout a period of four decades, Cuba sent 67,000 health workers to structural cooperation programs, usually for at least two years, in 94 countries ... an average of 3,350 health workers working abroad every year between 1960 and 2000.

==== Post–Cold War relations ====
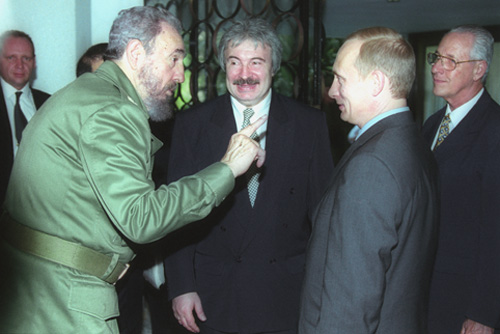
Fidel Castro with Russian President Vladimir Putin, December 2000

In the post–Cold War environment Cuban support for guerrilla warfare in Latin America has largely subsided, though the Cuban government continued to provide political assistance and support for left leaning groups and parties in the developing Western Hemisphere.

When Soviet leader Mikhail Gorbachev visited Cuba in 1989, the ideological relationship between Havana and Moscow was strained by Gorbachev's implementation of economic and political reforms in the USSR. "We are witnessing sad things in other socialist countries, very sad things", lamented Castro in November 1989, in reference to the changes that were sweeping such communist allies as the Soviet Union, East Germany, Hungary, and Poland. The subsequent dissolution of the Soviet Union in 1991 had an immediate and devastating effect on Cuba.

Cuba today works with a growing bloc of Latin American politicians opposed to the "Washington consensus", the American-led doctrine that free trade, open markets, and privatization will lift poor third world countries out of economic stagnation. The Cuban government condemned neoliberalism as a destructive force in the developing world, creating an alliance with Presidents Hugo Chávez of Venezuela and Evo Morales of Bolivia in opposing such policies.

Currently, Cuba has diplomatically friendly relationships with Presidents Nicolás Maduro of Venezuela with Maduro as perhaps the country's staunchest ally in the post-Soviet era. Cuba has sent thousands of teachers and medical personnel to Venezuela to assist Maduro's socialist oriented economic programs. Maduro, in turn provides Cuba with lower priced petroleum. Cuba's debt for oil to Venezuela is believed to be on the order of one billion US dollars.

Historically during Nicaragua's initial Sandinista period and since the 2007 election of Daniel Ortega, Cuba has maintained close relations with Nicaragua.

In the wake of the Russian invasion of Ukraine and the ongoing international isolation of Russia, Cuba emerged as one of the few countries that maintained friendly relations with the Kremlin. Cuban president Miguel Diaz-Canel visited Vladimir Putin in Moscow in November 2022, where the two leaders opened a monument of Fidel Castro, as well as speaking out against U.S. sanctions against Russian and Cuba.

== Diplomatic relations ==
List of countries which Cuba maintains diplomatic relations with:

#	Country	Date
1	Guatemala	30 April 1902
2	Mexico	20 May 1902
3	Netherlands	20 May 1902
4	United Kingdom	20 May 1902
5	United States	27 May 1902
6	France	11 June 1902
7	Venezuela	14 June 1902
8	Switzerland	18 June 1902
9	Spain	21 June 1902
10	Bolivia	19 July 1902
11	Belgium	18 August 1902
12	Uruguay	1 September 1902
13	Sweden	30 September 1902
14	El Salvador	11 November 1902
15	Colombia	1902
16	Ecuador	24 April 1903
17	Chile	19 October 1903
18	Honduras	24 November 1903
19	Italy	20 December 1903
20	Haiti	3 February 1904
21	Dominican Republic	5 April 1904
22	Panama	7 April 1904
23	Peru	11 January 1905
24	Nicaragua	3 September 1905
25	Norway	20 June 1906
26	Paraguay	13 July 1906
27	Brazil	13 December 1906
—	Costa Rica (suspended)	17 December 1907
28	Argentina	12 May 1909
29	Denmark	29 June 1911
30	Portugal	16 May 1919
31	Czech Republic	23 November 1920
32	Austria	15 January 1924
33	Romania	13 April 1927
34	Finland	5 April 1929
35	Japan	21 December 1929
36	Greece	29 May 1930
37	Poland	1 January 1933
—	Holy See	2 September 1935
38	Luxembourg	25 November 1942
39	Serbia	30 August 1943
40	Canada	16 March 1945
41	Philippines	4 July 1946
42	Egypt	5 September 1949
43	Turkey	25 November 1952
44	Pakistan	5 February 1954
—	Israel (suspended)	16 June 1954
45	Germany	30 June 1955
46	Iceland	26 January 1956
47	Saudi Arabia	10 February 1956
48	Thailand	19 May 1958
49	Sri Lanka	29 July 1959
—	Sovereign Military Order of Malta	29 July 1959
50	Ghana	23 September 1959
51	Tunisia	23 September 1959
52	India	12 January 1960
53	Indonesia	22 January 1960
54	Iraq	5 April 1960
55	Russia	8 May 1960
56	Lebanon	15 June 1960
57	North Korea	29 August 1960
58	Guinea	30 August 1960
59	China	28 September 1960
60	Bulgaria	14 October 1960
61	Cyprus	22 November 1960
63	Vietnam	2 December 1960
63	Mongolia	7 December 1960
64	Albania	15 December 1960
65	Hungary	18 December 1960
66	Mali	30 December 1960
67	Morocco	16 April 1962
68	Tanzania	6 May 1962
69	Algeria	7 October 1962
70	Cambodia	26 October 1962
71	Republic of the Congo	10 May 1964
72	Syria	11 August 1965
73	Sierra Leone	24 April 1972
74	Yemen	4 May 1972
75	Zambia	19 July 1972
76	Mauritania	16 August 1972
77	Barbados	8 December 1972
78	Guyana	8 December 1972
79	Jamaica	8 December 1972
80	Trinidad and Tobago	8 December 1972
81	Equatorial Guinea	27 December 1972
82	Bangladesh	15 January 1973
83	Guinea-Bissau	1 October 1973
84	Benin	1 February 1974
85	Burundi	2 February 1974
86	Gabon	26 March 1974
87	Democratic Republic of the Congo	11 April 1974
88	Madagascar	11 April 1974
89	Liberia	19 April 1974
90	Kuwait	29 April 1974
91	Uganda	9 May 1974
92	Nigeria	1 July 1974
93	Senegal	9 August 1974
94	Cameroon	31 August 1974
95	Laos	1 November 1974
96	Bahamas	30 November 1974
97	Malaysia	6 February 1975
98	Iran	10 February 1975
99	Nepal	19 March 1975
100	Mozambique	25 June 1975
101	Ethiopia	18 July 1975
102	Cape Verde	5 September 1975
103	Afghanistan	23 September 1975
104	Angola	15 November 1975
105	Burkina Faso	11 December 1975
106	Libya	18 February 1976
107	São Tomé and Príncipe	10 April 1976
108	Niger	25 April 1976
109	Myanmar	12 October 1976
110	Chad	18 October 1976
111	Mauritius	18 October 1976
112	Comoros	21 December 1976
113	Maldives	29 January 1977
114	Malta	11 April 1977
115	Botswana	9 December 1977
116	Seychelles	12 April 1978
117	Togo	18 January 1979
118	Grenada	14 April 1979
119	Gambia	19 May 1979
120	Suriname	31 May 1979
121	Lesotho	14 June 1979
122	Sudan	20 June 1979
123	Saint Lucia	23 August 1979
124	Jordan	7 September 1979
125	Rwanda	7 September 1979
—	Sahrawi Arab Democratic Republic	21 January 1980
126	Zimbabwe	20 April 1980
127	Vanuatu	11 March 1983
128	Ivory Coast	11 February 1986
129	Australia	31 January 1989
—	State of Palestine	3 February 1989
130	Somalia	31 July 1989
131	Papua New Guinea	13 October 1989
132	Qatar	13 December 1989
133	Namibia	23 March 1990
134	Estonia	12 November 1991
135	Latvia	20 December 1991
136	Ukraine	12 March 1992
137	Moldova	17 March 1992
138	Kyrgyzstan	20 March 1992
139	Turkmenistan	23 March 1992
140	Tajikistan	25 March 1992
141	Armenia	27 March 1992
142	Azerbaijan	10 April 1992
143	Kazakhstan	14 April 1992
144	Belarus	16 April 1992
145	Georgia	18 April 1992
146	Saint Vincent and the Grenadines	26 May 1992
147	Slovenia	22 September 1992
148	Croatia	23 September 1992
149	Slovakia	1 January 1993
150	Antigua and Barbuda	6 April 1994
151	South Africa	11 May 1994
152	Oman	23 May 1994
153	Bahrain	17 June 1994
154	Saint Kitts and Nevis	10 May 1995
155	Belize	15 July 1995
156	Eswatini	22 September 1995
157	Andorra	19 October 1995
158	Kenya	19 October 1995
159	Dominica	18 May 1996
160	San Marino	28 May 1996
161	Eritrea	8 November 1996
162	Brunei	4 April 1997
163	Singapore	18 April 1997
164	Bosnia and Herzegovina	29 April 1997
165	Liechtenstein	11 June 1997
166	Malawi	10 December 1997
167	Djibouti	20 November 1998
168	New Zealand	17 February 1999
169	Ireland	27 October 1999
170	Central African Republic	3 March 2000
171	North Macedonia	5 May 2000
172	United Arab Emirates	18 March 2002
173	Nauru	7 May 2002
174	Timor-Leste	20 May 2002
175	Tonga	17 June 2002
176	Fiji	19 July 2002
—	Cook Islands	1 September 2002
177	Kiribati	1 September 2002
178	Solomon Islands	19 December 2002
179	Uzbekistan	13 March 2006
180	Tuvalu	26 April 2006
181	Montenegro	20 October 2006
182	Samoa	11 October 2007
183	Monaco	19 December 2007
184	South Sudan	10 July 2011
185	Bhutan	26 September 2011
186	Lithuania	26 September 2013
—	Niue	5 September 2014
187	Federated States of Micronesia	9 September 2015
188	Palau	26 September 2015
189	Marshall Islands	27 September 2015
190	South Korea	14 February 2024

== Bilateral relations ==
=== Africa ===
Country	Formal Relations Began	Notes
Angola		See Angola–Cuba relations: Angola has an embassy in Havana.; Cuba has an embassy in Luanda.
Egypt	5 September 1949	Cuba has an embassy in Cairo.; Egypt has an embassy in Havana.
Equatorial Guinea	27 December 1972	Cuba has an embassy in Malabo.; Equatorial Guinea has an embassy in Havana.
Ethiopia	18 July 1975	See Cuba–Ethiopia relations: Cuba has an embassy in Addis Ababa.; Ethiopia has an embassy in Havana.
Kenya	19 October 1995	See Cuba–Kenya relations: Cuba has an embassy in Nairobi.; Kenya is accredited to Cuba from its high commission in Kingston, Jamaica.
Libya	1 March 1976	See Cuba–Libya relations Both countries established diplomatic relations on 1 March 1976.: Cuba is accredited to Libya from its embassy in Cairo, Egypt.; Libya has an embassy in Havana.
Namibia		See Cuba–Namibia relations Cuban-Namibian relations began during the South African Border War, when Cuba helped establish a number of training camps in Angola for the People's Liberation Army of Namibia (PLAN), armed wing of the South West African People's Organisation (SWAPO). Cuba also supported both SWAPO and PLAN through a number of political and diplomatic initiatives. Since independence, Namibia and Cuba have held joint meetings every two years for Economic, Scientific-Technical and Commercial Cooperation. In 2005, it was reported that 1,460 Cuban professionals had worked in Namibia, including 208 in 2005.: Cuba has an embassy in Windhoek.; Namibia has an embassy in Havana.
Sahrawi Arab Democratic Republic	30 January 1980	See Cuba–Sahrawi Arab Democratic Republic relations: Cuba is accredited to the Sahrawi Arab Democratic Republic from its embassy in Algiers, Algeria.; The Sahrawi Arab Democratic Republic has an embassy in Havana.
Sierra Leone	24 April 1972	The Cuban government initially pledged to send one hundred and sixty five health workers to Sierra Leone to take part in combating the Ebola virus epidemic in West Africa. Later the Cuban government expanded this pledge with an additional three hundred health workers being sent throughout the region.: Cuba has an embassy in Freetown.; Sierra Leone is accredited to Cuba from its Permanent Mission to the United Nations in New York City.
South Africa		See Cuba–South Africa relations: Cuba has an embassy in Pretoria.; South Africa has an embassy in Havana.

=== Americas ===
Cuba has supported a number of leftist groups and parties in Latin America and the Caribbean since the 1959 revolution. In the 1960s Cuba established close ties with the emerging Guatemalan social movement led by Luis Augusto Turcios Lima, and supported the establishment of the URNG, a militant organization that has evolved into one of Guatemala's current political parties. In the 1980s Cuba backed both the Sandinistas in Nicaragua and the FMLN in El Salvador, providing military and intelligence training, weapons, guidance, and organizational support.

Country	Formal Relations Began	Notes
Argentina	12 May 1909	See Argentina–Cuba relations: Argentina has an embassy in Havana.; Cuba has an embassy in Buenos Aires.
Bolivia		See Bolivia–Cuba relations: Bolivia has an embassy in Havana.; Cuba has an embassy in La Paz.
Brazil		See Brazil–Cuba relations With the electoral win of the President of Brazil, Luiz Inácio Lula da Silva in 2002 ties between Cuba and Brazil steadily warmed. Brazil continued to play its part in trying to revive and upgrade the offshore oil and gas infrastructure of Cuba. In addition, talks led by Brazil were underway seeking to develop a framework for Cuba to become a normalised affiliate member of the Mercosur bloc of countries. Brazilian-Cuban relations deteriorated greatly under the presidency of Brazilian rightwing president Jair Bolsonaro since 2019 .He stopped Mais Medicos (More Doctors) programme and thousands of Cuban doctors left Brazil. In November 2019, Brazil voted for the first time against an annual United Nations resolution condemning and calling for an end to Washington's economic embargo on Cuba.: Brazil has an embassy in Havana.; Cuba has an embassy in Brasília and a consulate-general in São Paulo.
Canada	1945	See Canada–Cuba relations Canada has always maintained consistently cordial relations with Cuba, in spite of considerable pressure from the United States, and the island is also one of the most popular travel destinations for Canadian citizens. Canada-Cuba relations can be traced back to the 18th century, when vessels from the Atlantic provinces of Canada traded codfish and beer for rum and sugar. Cuba was the first country in the Caribbean selected by Canada for a diplomatic mission. Official diplomatic relations were established in 1945, when Emile Vaillancourt, a noted writer and historian, was designated Canada's representative in Cuba. Canada and Mexico were the only two countries in the hemisphere to maintain uninterrupted diplomatic relations with Cuba following the Cuban Revolution in 1959. In 1994, a joint venture was formed between the Cuban Nickel Union and the Canadian firm Sherritt International, which operates a mining and processing plant on the island in Moa. A second enterprise, Cobalt Refinery Co. Inc., was created in Alberta for nickel refining. Canada has been critical of the U.S. trade embargo against Cuba, and strongly objected to the Helms-Burton Act. In 1996 Foreign Affairs Minister Lloyd Axworthy stated: "Canada shares the U.S. objectives of improving human rights standards and moving to more representative government in Cuba. But we are concerned that the Helms-Burton Act takes the wrong approach. That is why we have been working with other countries to uphold the principles of international law". In 1996 a Private Member's Bill was introduced, but not made law, in the Canadian Parliament; this law called the Godfrey–Milliken Bill was in response to the extraterritoriality of the aforementioned Act. Former Prime Minister Pierre Trudeau and Fidel Castro were personal friends. Castro was among Pierre Trudeau's pallbearers at his funeral in 2000. Former Prime Minister Jean Chrétien and Fidel Castro also maintained a close relationship.: Canada has an embassy in Havana.; Cuba has an embassy in Ottawa.
Chile		See Chile–Cuba relations See also: Fidel Castro's state visit to Chile Cuba has been since the 1960s a reference point to left wing politicians in Chile. Recently relations to Cuba has been hot subject in Concertación politics since the Christian Democrat Party of Chile, member of the Concertación, has supported a harder line in the diplomatic relations with Cuba while the Socialist Party of Chile has opposed this. In 1971, despite an Organization of American States convention that no nation in the Western Hemisphere would have a relationship with Cuba (the only exception being Mexico, which had refused to adopt that convention), Castro took a month-long visit to Chile, following the re-establishment of diplomatic relations with Cuba. The visit, in which Castro participated actively in the internal politics of the country, holding massive rallies and giving public advice to Salvador Allende, was seen by those on the political right as proof to support their view that "The Chilean Way to Socialism" was an effort to put Chile on the same path as Cuba.: Chile has an embassy in Havana.; Cuba has an embassy in Santiago.
Colombia		See Colombia–Cuba relations Cuba gave training, money, medicines, weapons and safe haven to members of Colombian guerrilla movements, especially to the ELN and also to members of the FARC, both of which were founded in the early 1960s. In the years leading up to his death, Fidel Castro made gestures of reconciliation with different Colombian government administrations, and has been considered responsible for facilitating talks between them and the opposing guerrilla groups.: Colombia has an embassy in Havana.; Cuba has an embassy in Bogotá.
Costa Rica (suspended)	1904	Costa Rica broke relations with Cuba in 1961 to protest Cuban support of the left in Central America and renewed formal diplomatic ties with Fidel Castro's government in March 2009. In 1995, Costa Rica established a consular office in Havana. Cuba opened a consular office in Costa Rica in 2001, but relations continued to be difficult. In 2006, shortly after the death of Augusto Pinochet, Costa Rican President Óscar Arias compared Fidel Castro's human rights record to that of the former Chilean president. In response, Cuban officials released a statement describing the Washington aligned Arias as a "vulgar mercenary" of U.S. officials, and asserting that Washington "always had on hand another opportunistic clown ready to follow its aggressive plans against Cuba.": Costa Rica has an embassy in Havana.; Cuba has an embassy in San José.
Dominican Republic		See Cuba-Dominican Republic relations: Cuba has an embassy in Santo Domingo.; Dominican Republic has an embassy in Havana.
El Salvador		Cuba and El Salvador resumed diplomatic relations on June 1, 2009. El Salvador previously suspended diplomatic relations with Cuba in 1961 due to the Cuban Revolution. Diplomatic ties were resumed after El Salvador's new president Mauricio Funes, who had pledged to reestablish them, was sworn into office. El Salvador is also the very last Latin American nation to resume diplomatic relations with Cuba.: Cuba has an embassy in San Salvador.; El Salvador has an embassy in Havana.
Grenada		See Cuba–Grenada relations: Cuba has an embassy in St. George's.; Grenada has an embassy in Havana.
Guatemala		See Cuba–Guatemala relations: Cuba has an embassy in Guatemala City.; Guatemala has an embassy in Havana.
Guyana	1972	Both countries established diplomatic relations on December 8, 1972.; Both countries are full members of the Organization of American States.; Cuba has an embassy in Georgetown.; Guyana has an embassy in Havana.
Haiti		See Cuba-Haiti relations: Cuba has an embassy in Port-au-Prince.; Haiti has an embassy in Havana.; Cuba resumed relations with Haiti in 1997 and since has sent thousands of doctors to Haiti since relations were re-established in 1997, performing hundreds of thousands of surgeries, medical consultations and have trained over 1,000 Haitian doctors at its medical schools. In addition, over 100,000 people in Haiti have become literate through Cuban efforts.
Jamaica	1972	See Cuba–Jamaica relations: Cuba has an embassy in Kingston.; Jamaica has an embassy in Havana.
Mexico	1902	See Cuba–Mexico relations Mexican President Enrique Peña Nieto with former Cuban President Fidel Castro in January 2014 Before the Cuban revolution, Mexico was the country where several Cubans were exiled fleeing political persecution by the government of Batista like Julio Antonio Mella, Juan Marinello, Fidel Castro and Raúl Castro. After the Cuban revolution when Cuba was expelled from the Organization of American States, Mexico did not support this resolution and abstained, claiming a non-intervention policy. Relations were stable from 1934 to 1998. Although the relationship between Cuba and Mexico remains strained, each side appears to make attempts to improve it. In 1998, Fidel Castro apologized when he said that "Mexican kids knew Mickey Mouse better than national heroes of their own country", which led Mexico to recall its ambassador from Havana. Rather, he said, his words were meant to underscore the cultural dominance of the US. Mexican President Vicente Fox apologized to Fidel Castro in 2002 over statements by Castro, who had taped their telephone conversation, to the effect that Fox forced him to leave a United Nations summit in Mexico so that he would not be in the presence of President Bush, who also attended. In 2004, Mexico suspended relations with Cuba after businessman Carlos Ahumada was arrested and deported to Mexico and the paperwork provided by the Cuban government proved that there was a plan from the Mexican government to make a complot against the potential presidential candidate from the opposition party Andrés Manuel López Obrador. In April 2012, Mexican president Felipe Calderón made a two-day visit to Havana. In January 2014, Mexican president Enrique Peña Nieto paid an official visit to Cuba.: Cuba has an embassy in Mexico City and consulates-general in Cancún, Mérida, Monterrey and Veracruz City.; Mexico has an embassy in Havana.
Panama		Cuba and Panama have restored diplomatic ties after breaking them off in 2004 when Panama's former president Mireya Moscoso pardoned four Cubans, including Luis Posada Carriles, who were accused of attempting to assassinate Cuban President Fidel Castro. The foreign minister of each country re-established official diplomatic relations in Havana by signing a document describing a spirit of fraternity that has long linked both nations. In March 2009, the governments of Costa Rica and El Salvador announced that they plan on re-establishing full diplomatic relations with Cuba.: Cuba has an embassy in Panama City.; Panama has an embassy in Havana.
Peru		See Cuba–Peru relations: Cuba has an embassy in Lima.; Peru has an embassy in Havana.
Suriname		See Cuba–Suriname relations: Cuba has an embassy in Paramaribo.; Suriname has an embassy in Havana.
United States		See Cuba–United States relations The Cuban Revolution led to the deterioration of relations between the two countries, with diplomatic ties broken on January 3, 1961. After an initial 54-year stretch of hostility, relations eased briefly from 2015 to 2017 in an effort known as the Cuban thaw. The diplomatic détente was reversed by the U.S. government shortly thereafter due to a variety of subsequent geopolitical issues. Modern diplomatic relations remain cold, stemming from historic conflict and divergent political ideologies.: Cuba has an embassy in Washington, D.C.; United States has an embassy in Havana.
Uruguay		See Cuba–Uruguay relations: Cuba has an embassy in Montevideo.; Uruguay has an embassy in Havana.
Venezuela		See Cuba–Venezuela relations Relations between Cuba and Venezuela significantly improved during the Presidency of Hugo Chávez. Chávez formed a major alliance with Cuban president Fidel Castro and significant trade relationship with Cuba since his election in 1999. The warm relationship between the two countries continued to intensify. Hugo Chávez described Castro as his mentor and called Cuba "a revolutionary democracy". In 2005 the two countries also signed cooperation agreements in the area of energy and electricity, an accord between Venezuela's oil company PDVSA and its Cuban counterpart Cupet to buy and sell crude oil and a crude oil storage agreement between the two companies. Hugo Chávez, who said he was one of the few people in the world who knew Castro's illness from July 31, 2006, helped Cuba undermine a strict U.S. embargo by sending cheap oil and boosting commercial relations. Agreements between Cuba and Venezuela, the world's No. 5 oil exporter, have brought more than 20,000 Cuban doctors to Venezuela to provide medical services for the poor. The program, one of numerous oil-funded social projects, helped Chávez build a strong political support base, and he won a reelection bid in December 2006. A U.S. official told the Miami Herald in 2016 that U.S. estimates of total Venezuelan subsidies to Cuba per year "are up to the $2 billion figure." This is comparable to the $4 billion to $6 billion that the Soviet Union once pumped into Cuba per year.: Cuba has an embassy in Caracas.; Venezuela has an embassy in Havana.

=== Asia ===
Region	Formal Relations Began	Notes
Armenia	27 March 1992	Both countries established diplomatic relations on 27 March 1992.; Armenia is accredited to Cuba from its embassy in Mexico City, Mexico.; Cuba is accredited to Armenia from its embassy in Moscow, Russia.
Azerbaijan	27 March 1992	See Azerbaijan–Cuba relations: The diplomatic relations between the Republic of Azerbaijan and the Republic of Cuba were established on March 27, 1992.; There is an Azerbaijan-Cuba interparliamentary working group acting within the parliament of the Republic of Azerbaijan.; There is a Cuba-Azerbaijan interparliamentary working group acting within the parliament of the Republic of Cuba.; Azerbaijan has an embassy in Havana.; Cuba has an embassy in Baku.
China		See China–Cuba relations As the economy of the Soviet Union fell into a decline which ultimately led to its collapse in 1991, the People's Republic of China has emerged as a new key partner for Cuba's foreign relations and the guardian of socialist countries around the world. Relations between Cuba and China continue to grow including deals for China to set up a possible military base in Cuba, similar to the Bejucal Base and an agreement was signed between China and Cuba for China open more factories producing local goods such as televisions. Cuba has also purchased from China a wide range of items including bicycles, buses, refrigerators, rice cookers, energy-saving lightbulbs and diesel-electric locomotives with the aim of providing a boost to Cuba's national infrastructure.: China has an embassy in Havana.; Cuba has an embassy in Beijing and consulates-general in Guangzhou and Shanghai.
India		See Cuba–India relations Relations between India and Cuba have generally been warm and cordial since the Cuban revolution. Both nations are part of the Non-Aligned Movement and Cuba has repeatedly called for a more "democratic" representation of the United Nations Security Council, supporting India's candidacy for permanent membership on a reformed Security Council. Fidel Castro had said that "The maturity of India…, its unconditional adherence to the principles which lay at the foundation of the Non-Aligned Movement give us the assurances that under the wise leadership of Indira Gandhi (the former Prime Minister of India), the non-aligned countries will continue advancing in their inalienable role as a bastion for peace, national independence and development…" India provided Cuba with 10,000 tonnes of wheat and 10,000 tonnes of rice in 1992 when Cuba was undergoing hardship. Fidel Castro termed the donation as the "Bread of India" because it was sufficient for one loaf of bread for each one of the then Cuban population of eleven million people. India also provided donations worth two million dollars during the Cuban earthquake.: Cuba has an embassy in New Delhi.; India has an embassy in Havana.
Indonesia		See Cuba–Indonesia relations: Cuba has an embassy in Jakarta.; Indonesia has an embassy in Havana.
Iran		See Iran–Cuba relations Iran has a productive trade balance with Cuba. The two governments signed a document to bolster cooperation in Havana in January 2006. President Mahmoud Ahmadinejad called relations "firm and progressive" over the past three decades. Ahmadinejad made an official visit to the island in January 2012 as part of a series of official visits to various countries in Latin America. During his brief stay in Cuba, Ahmadinejad met with Fidel Castro and said that the two countries were "fighting on the same front.": Cuba has an embassy in Tehran.; Iran has an embassy in Havana.
Iraq		See Cuba–Iraq relations: Cuba is accredited to Iraq from its embassy in Tehran, Iran.; Iraq is accredited to Cuba from its embassy in Mexico City, Mexico.
Israel (suspended)		See Cuba–Israel relations Cuban ambassador to Israel with Golda Meir, 1960 On 29 November 1947, Cuba voted against the United Nations Partition Plan for Palestine, the Cuban delegation stating they would vote against partition because they could not be party to coercing the majority in Palestine. Nevertheless, Israel came into being on 14 May 1948, and Cuba recognised the State of Israel de facto on 14 January 1949. In March 1949 Cuba voted in the UN Security Council in favour of admission of Israel to the United Nations, and recognised Israel de jure on 18 April 1949. In May of that year Cuba also voted in favour of Israel's admission to the UN in the UN General Assembly. Israel-Cuba relations have been icy since the 1960s. Cuba didn't succumb to Arab pressure to sever relations with Israel, but sent troops to fight against Israel during the War of Attrition (1967–70), and also joined the expeditionary forces during the 1973 Yom Kippur War, and broke diplomatic relations with Israel the same year. Israel has been the only country to consistently vote with the U.S. in the UN General Assembly against the annual resolution criticizing the embargo, which began in 1992. In late 2010, Fidel Castro, who no longer held office in Cuba's government, stated that he believes Israel has a "right to exist", which is a shift from his regime's earlier policy. Margalit Bejarano posed in 2015 that any future relationship between Israel and Cuba will not solely rest on the course that will take Havana-Washington ties, but will also factor in Cuba's dependence on Iran, on Venezuela and its closeness to the Palestinians. In the light of the thaw in US-Cuba relations, the Israeli government is re-examining the state of its relations with Cuba – Israel is presently represented in Cuba through an interest section in the Canadian embassy.
Japan	21 December 1929	See Cuba–Japan relations Cuba and Japan established diplomatic relations on 21 December 1929.
Malaysia		See Cuba–Malaysia relations: Cuba has an embassy in Kuala Lumpur.; Malaysia has an embassy in Havana.
Mongolia	7 December 1960	Cuba has an embassy in Ulaanbaatar.; Mongolia has an embassy in Havana.; In the 1980s, the trade and cooperation agreements between the two governments were ratified.
Nepal	25 March 1975	Cuban Ambassador to India is accredited to Nepal.; Embassy of Nepal in Ottawa is concurrently accredited to Cuba.; The friendly relations between the two countries have been further strengthened by exchange of visits and contacts at various levels in the past. Late King Birendra paid an official visit to Havana in September 1979 to represent Nepal in the 6th NAM summit.; The Cuban Government had offered some scholarships to the Nepalese students in the streams of culture and sports, engineering, psychology and agriculture for bachelor's degrees.; A medical team from the Government of Cuba extended medical treatment to the earthquake affected people of Nepal.
North Korea	29 August 1960	See Cuba–North Korea relations The Republic of Cuba has had diplomatic relations with North Korea since 29 August 1960. Cuba maintains an embassy in Pyongyang and North Korea maintains an embassy in Havana. Che Guevara then a Cuban government minister visited North Korea in 1960 and proclaimed it a model for Cuba to follow. Cuban leader Fidel Castro visited in 1986. In 2013 a North Korean cargo ship seized while travelling through the Panama Canal and was found to be carrying weapons from Cuba, apparently to be repaired in North Korea. The ship was later returned to the North Korean government.
Pakistan		See Cuba–Pakistan relations The relations between the two countries strengthened after Cuba provided humanitarian assistance to the victims of the 2005 Kashmir earthquake. Both nations continue to strengthen the bilateral relations especially in the fields of higher education, agriculture, industry and science and technology and have also held talks for military cooperation. In March 2008 ambassador Gustavo Machin Gomez met Gen. Tariq Majid, the Chairman of Joint Chiefs of Staff Committee (CJCSC) at Joint Staff Headquarters and discussed issues related to military cooperation. Both of them expressed positive views over the increasing relations between the two nations and were optimistic that the bilateral cooperation will expand in different fields. Majid stressed that Pakistan has formed strong defence infrastructure both in defence production and in shape of military academies to provide help and cooperation to the Military of Cuba. He also said that both countries should use their capacity for expanding military cooperation. In an interview with Overseas Pakistani Friends, Machin Gomez suggested further ways that Cuba and Pakistan might be able to help each other.: Cuba has an embassy in Islamabad.; Pakistan has an embassy in Havana.
Philippines		See Cuba-Philippines relations Like Cuba, the Philippines was once a Spanish possession, and Spanish rule in both colonies ended with the victory of the United States in the Spanish–American War. Provisions in the subsequent 1898 Treaty of Paris gave Cuba independence while giving the Philippine Islands over to American control, which was gradually lessened until the country achieved full sovereignty on 4 July 1946. Despite the Philippines being a long-time American ally, it has denounced the American sanctions against Cuba.: Cuba is accredited to the Philippines from its embassy in Kuala Lumpur, Malaysia.; Philippines is accredited to Cuba from its embassy in Mexico City, Mexico.
South Korea	14 February 2024	See Cuba–South Korea relations Both countries established diplomatic relations on 12 July 1949, Cuba was the first country that recognize South Korea in Latin America. There was no official-level diplomatic relation between the Cuba and South Korea from 1 January 1959 to 14 February 2024. Despite this there has been unofficial interactions in the economic level between the two countries. For instance South Korea's Hyundai Heavy Industries sent Packaged power station mobile generators to Cuba for the country's power grids. A picture of a PPS was later incorporated into the 10 Cuban convertible peso banknote.
Syria		See Cuba–Syria relations
Turkey	1952	See Cuba–Turkey relations: Cuba has an embassy in Ankara.; Turkey has an embassy in Havana.; Trade volume between the two countries was US$54.7 million in 2019 (Cuban exports/imports: 11.8/42.9 million USD).
Uzbekistan	13 March 2006	See Cuba–Uzbekistan relations: Both countries established diplomatic relations on 13 March 2006.; Uzbekistan is accredited to Cuba from its embassy in Washington, D.C. (USA).; Cuba is accredited to Uzbekistan from its embassy in Baku (Azerbaijan).
Vietnam	December 1960	See Cuba–Vietnam relations Diplomatic relations between the two countries was established in December 1960. Since then, Vietnam has become Cuba's second-largest trading partner in Asia, with Vietnam trailing behind China. Vietnam, just as Cuba is, is a Communist state and socialist state.

=== Europe ===
Country	Formal Relations Began	Notes
European Union		See Cuba–European Union relations European Union (EU) relations with Cuba are governed by the Common Position, as approved by the European Council of Ministers in 1996, which is updated every six months following regular evaluations. According to the Common Position "the objective of the European Union in its relations with Cuba is to encourage a process of transition to a pluralist democracy and respect for human rights and fundamental freedoms, as well as sustainable recovery and improvement in the living standards of the Cuban people". Cuba rejects the Common Position as interference in its internal affairs. There is an EU Delegation in Havana that works under the responsibility of the EC Delegation in Santo Domingo, Dominican Republic. Cuba benefits from the GPS (Generalized Preference System) preferential treatment for its exports. Furthermore, Cuba does not benefit from the ACP-EU Sugar Protocol but from a sugar quota granted by the EU (some 59,000 tonnes per year; duty paid on this quota is EUR 98/t).
Belgium		During Spanish Governor-general period, Cuba was offered for sale in 1837.: Belgium has an embassy in Havana.; Cuba has an embassy in Brussels.
France		See Cuba–France relations: Cuba has an embassy in Paris.; France has an embassy in Havana.
Greece		See Cuba–Greece relations: Cuba has an embassy in Athens.; Greece has an embassy in Havana.
Holy See		See Cuba–Holy See relations: Cuba has an embassy in Rome accredited to the Holy See.; Holy See has an apostolic nunciature in Havana.
Ireland		Cuba has an embassy in Dublin.; Ireland is accredited to Cuba from its embassy in Mexico City, Mexico.
Italy		Cuba has an embassy in Rome.; Italy has an embassy in Havana.
Poland	1933	See Cuba–Poland relations: Cuba has an embassy in Warsaw.; Poland has an embassy in Havana.
Russia		See Cuba–Russia relations Relations between the two countries suffered somewhat during the Boris Yeltsin administration, as Cuba was forced to look for new major allies, such as China, after the dissolution of the Soviet Union. Relations improved when Vladimir Putin was elected as the new Russian President. Putin, and later Dmitry Medvedev, emphasized re-establishing strong relations with old Soviet allies. In 2008, Medvedev visited Havana and Raúl Castro made a week-long trip to Moscow. In that same year the two governments signed multiple economic agreements and Russia sent tons of humanitarian aid to Cuba. Cuba, meanwhile, gave staunch political support for Russia during the 2008 South Ossetia war. Relations between the two nations are currently at a post-Soviet high, and talks about potentially re-establishing a Russian military presence in Cuba are even beginning to surface.: Cuba has an embassy in Moscow.; Russia has an embassy in Havana.
Serbia		See Cuba–Serbia relations Cuba and Serbia have a long history of diplomatic relations from the period of Socialist Federal Republic of Yugoslavia when both countries were members of Non-Aligned Movement. Cuba supports Serbia in its stance towards Kosovo considering Kosovo's independence an illegitimate act and a violation of international law and principles of the United Nations Charter. Serbia supports Cuba at the United Nations in condemning the United States embargo.: Cuba has an embassy in Belgrade.; Serbia has an embassy in Havana.
Spain	1899	See Cuba–Spain relations: Cuba has an embassy in Madrid and consulates-general in Barcelona, Las Palmas, Santiago de Compostela and Seville.; Spain has an embassy and consulate-general in Havana and a consulate-general in Camagüey.
United Kingdom	20 May 1902	See Cuba–United Kingdom relations Foreign Office Minister Hugo Swire with Cuban Ambassador to the UK Esther Gloria Armenteros Cárdenas in London, December 2012. Cuba established diplomatic relations with the United Kingdom on 20 May 1902.: Cuba maintains an embassy in London.; United Kingdom is accredited to Cuba from its embassy in Havana.; Both countries share common membership of the World Trade Organization. Bilaterally the two countries have an Investment Agreement, and a Political Dialogue and Co-operation Agreement.

=== Oceania ===
Cuba has two embassies in Oceania, located in Wellington (opened in November 2007) and also one in Canberra opened October 24, 2008. It also has a Consulate General in Sydney. However, Cuba has official diplomatic relations with Nauru since 2002 and the Solomon Islands since 2003, and maintains relations with other Pacific countries by providing aid.

In 2008, Cuba will reportedly be sending doctors to the Solomon Islands, Vanuatu, Tuvalu, Nauru and Papua New Guinea, while seventeen medical students from Vanuatu will study in Cuba. It may also provide training for Fiji doctors. Indeed, Fiji's ambassador to the United Nations, Berenado Vunibobo, has stated that his country may seek closer relations with Cuba, and in particular medical assistance, following a decline in Fiji's relations with New Zealand.

Country	Formal Relations Began	Notes
Australia	1989	Australia and Cuba have a growing relationship on positive terms. Relations began in 1989. Relations were given a rebirth in 2009 when the foreign minister Stephen Smith visited Cuba. In 2010, Cuba's foreign minister Bruno Rodríguez visited Australia. The ministers signed a memorandum of understanding in political cooperation between the foreign ministries and for closer bilateral relations. There is a Cuban embassy in Australia. It was opened on 24 October 2008. There are only two Australia–Cuba bilateral treaties, extended to Australia by the British Empire covering extradition.: Australia is accredited to Cuba from its embassy in Mexico City, Mexico.; Cuba has an embassy in Canberra.
Kiribati		See Cuba–Kiribati relations Relations between Cuba and Kiribati are nascent, having developed in the 2000s (decade). Like other countries in Oceania, Kiribati is a beneficiary of Cuban medical aid; bilateral relations between Tarawa and Havana should be viewed within the scope of Cuba's regional policy in Oceania. There are currently sixteen Cuban doctors providing specialised medical care in Kiribati, with sixteen more scheduled to join them. Cubans have also offered training to I-Kiribati doctors. Cuban doctors have reportedly provided a dramatic improvement to the field of medical care in Kiribati, reducing the child mortality rate in that country by 80 percent, and winning the proverbial hearts and minds in the Pacific. In response, the Solomon Islands began recruiting Cuban doctors in July 2007, while Papua New Guinea and Fiji considered following suit.
Nauru		In June 2007, Nauru adopted the "Cuban literacy method", reportedly used also in several other countries. In October 2007, Nauruan Foreign Minister and Trade Minister David Adeang travelled to Cuba to strengthen relations between the two island nations. This led to the creation of a Cuba-Nauru Joint Intergovernmental Commission for Economic Cooperation. An unspecified number of Cuban doctors are serving in Nauru.
New Zealand		Regarding relations with New Zealand, Cuban ambassador José Luis Robaina García said his country had "admiration for New Zealand's independent foreign policy".: Cuba has an embassy in Wellington.; New Zealand is accredited to Cuba from its embassy in Mexico City, Mexico.
Solomon Islands		See Cuba – Solomon Islands relations Relations between the Solomon Islands and Cuba have only a short history. The two countries moved to establish relations from the 2000s (decade), and particularly from 2007, within the context of Cuba's growing interest in the Pacific Islands region. Like other countries in Oceania, Solomon Islands is a beneficiary of Cuban medical aid; bilateral relations between Havana and Honiara must be viewed within the scope of Cuba's regional policy in Oceania. In April 2007, the Solomon Star reported that the Solomon Islands' High Commissioner to the United Nations was soon to be sworn in as Ambassador to Cuba. In September 2007, it was announced that 40 Cuban doctors would be sent to the Solomon Islands. The Solomons' Minister of Foreign Affairs Patterson Oti said that Solomon Islander doctors would "learn from their Cuban colleagues in specialized areas". In addition to providing doctors, Cuba provided scholarships for 50 Solomon Islanders to study medicine in Cuba for free.
Tuvalu		See Cuba–Tuvalu relations Relations between Tuvalu and Cuba are recent, having developed in the 2000s (decade). Like other countries in Oceania, Tuvalu is a beneficiary of Cuban medical aid; bilateral relations between Funafuti and Havana must be viewed within the scope of Cuba's regional policy in Oceania.
Vanuatu		See Cuba–Vanuatu relations Relations between the Republic of Vanuatu and Cuba began shortly after the former gained its independence from France and the United Kingdom in 1980, and began establishing its own foreign policy as a newly independent state. Vanuatu and Cuba established official diplomatic relations in 1983.

== International organizations and groups ==
ACS • ALBA • AOSIS • CELAC • CTO • ECLAC • G33 • G77 • IAEA • ICAO • ICRM • IFAD • ILO • IMO • Interpol • IOC • ISO • ITU • LAES • NAM • OAS • OEI • OPANAL • OPCW • PAHO • Rio Group • UN • UNCTAD • UNESCO • UPU • WCO • WHO • WIPO • WMO

=== Caribbean Community (CARICOM) ===
Ties between the nations of the Caribbean Community (CARICOM) and Cuba have remained cordial over the course of the later half of the 20th century. Formal diplomatic relations between the CARICOM economic giants: Barbados, Jamaica, Guyana and Trinidad and Tobago have existed since 1972, and have over time led to an increase in cooperation between the CARICOM Heads of Government and Cuba. At a summit meeting of sixteen Caribbean countries in 1998, Fidel Castro called for regional unity, saying that only strengthened cooperation between Caribbean countries would prevent their domination by rich nations in a global economy. Cuba, for many years regionally isolated, increased grants and scholarships to the Caribbean countries.

To celebrate ties between the Caribbean Community and Cuba in 2002 the Heads of Government of Cuba and CARICOM have designated the day of December 8 to be called 'CARICOM-Cuba Day'. The day is the exact date of the formal opening of diplomatic relations between the first CARICOM-four and Cuba.

In December 2005, during the second CARICOM/CUBA summit held in Barbados, heads of CARICOM and Cuba agreed to deepen their ties in the areas of socio-economic and political cooperation in addition to medical care assistance. Since the meeting, Cuba has opened four additional embassies in the Caribbean Community including: Antigua and Barbuda, Dominica, Suriname, and Saint Vincent and the Grenadines. This development makes Cuba the only nation to have embassies in all independent countries of the Caribbean Community. CARICOM and Canadian politicians have jointly maintained that through the International inclusion of Cuba, a more positive change might indeed be brought about there (politically) as has been witnessed in the People's Republic of China.

Cuban cooperation with the Caribbean was extended by a joint health programme between Cuba and Venezuela named Operación Milagro, set up in 2004. The initiative is part of the Sandino commitment, which sees both countries coming together with the aim of offering free ophthalmology operations to an estimated 4.5 million people in Latin America and the Caribbean over a ten-year period. According to Denzil Douglas, the prime minister of St. Kitts and Nevis, more than 1,300 students from member nations are studying in Cuba while more than 1,000 Cuban doctors, nurses and other technicians are working throughout the region. In 1998 Trinidadian and Tobagonian Prime Minister Patrick Manning had a heart valve replacement surgery in Cuba and returned in 2004 to have a pacemaker implanted.

In December 2008 the CARICOM Heads of Government opened the third Cuba-CARICOM Summit in Cuba. The summit is to look at closer integration of the Caribbean Community and Cuba. During the summit the Caribbean Community (CARICOM) bestowed Fidel Castro with the highest honour of CARICOM, The Honorary Order of the Caribbean Community which is presented in exceptional circumstances to those who have offered their services in an outstanding way and have made significant contributions to the region.

In 2017 Cuba and the Caribbean Community (CARICOM) bloc signed the "CARICOM-Cuba Trade and Economic Cooperation Agreement"

=== Organization of American States ===
Cuba was formerly excluded from participation in the Organization of American States under a decision adopted by the Eighth Meeting of Consultation in Punta del Este, Uruguay, on 21 January 1962. The resolution stated that as Cuba had officially identified itself as a Marxist–Leninist government, it was incompatible with "the principles and objectives of the inter-American system." This stance was frequently questioned by some member states. This situation came to an end on 3 June 2009, when foreign ministers assembled in San Pedro Sula, Honduras, for the OAS's 39th General Assembly, passed a vote to lift Cuba's suspension from the OAS. In its resolution (AG/RES 2438), the General Assembly decided that:

1. Resolution VI, [...] which excluded the Government of Cuba from its participation in the Inter-American system, hereby ceases to have effect
2. The participation of the Republic of Cuba in the OAS will be the result of a process of dialogue initiated at the request of the Government of Cuba, and in accordance with the practices, purposes, and principles of the OAS.

The reincorporation of Cuba as an active member had arisen regularly as a topic within the inter-American system (e.g., it was intimated by the outgoing ambassador of Mexico in 1998) but most observers did not see it as a serious possibility while the Socialist government remained in power. On 6 May 2005, President Fidel Castro reiterated that the island nation would not "be part of a disgraceful institution that has only humiliated the honor of Latin American nations".

In an editorial published by Granma, Fidel Castro applauded the Assembly's "rebellious" move and said that the date would "be recalled by future generations." However, a Declaration of the Revolutionary Government dated 8 June 2009 stated that while Cuba welcomed the Assembly's gesture, in light of the Organization's historical record "Cuba will not return to the OAS".

Cuba joined the Latin American Integration Association becoming the tenth member (out of 12) on 26 August 1999. The organization was set up in 1980 to encourage trade integration association. Its main objective is the establishment of a common market, in pursuit of the economic and social development of the region.

On September 15, 2006, Cuba officially took over leadership of the Non-Aligned Movement during the 14th summit of the organization in Havana.

== Cuban intervention abroad: 1959 – Early 1990s ==
Cuba became a staunch ally of the USSR during the Cold War, modeling its political structure after that of the CPSU. Owing to the fundamental role Internationalism plays in Cuban socialist ideology, Cuba became a major supporter of liberation movements not only in Latin America, but across the globe.

=== Black Panthers ===
In the 1960s and 1970s, Cuba openly supported the black nationalist and Marxist-oriented Black Panther Party of the U.S. Many members found their way into Cuba for political asylum, where Cuba welcomed them as refugees after they had been convicted in the U.S.

=== Palestine ===
Cuba also lent support to Palestinian nationalist groups against Israel, namely the Palestine Liberation Organization (PLO) and lesser-known Marxist–Leninist Popular Front for the Liberation of Palestine (PFLP). Fidel Castro called Israel practices "Zionist Fascism." The Palestinians received training from Cuba's General Intelligence Directorate, as well as financial and diplomatic support from the Cuban government. However, in 2010, Castro indicated that he also strongly supported Israel's right to exist.

=== Irish Republicans ===
The Irish Republican political party, Sinn Féin has political links to the Cuban government. Fidel Castro expressed support for the Irish Republican cause of a United Ireland.

== Humanitarian aid ==
Since the establishment of the Revolutionary Government of Cuba in 1959, the country has sent more than 52,000 medical workers abroad to work in needy countries, including countries affected by the 2004 Indian Ocean earthquake and the 2005 Kashmir earthquake. There are currently about 20,000 Cuban doctors working in 68 countries across three continents, including a 135-strong medical team in Java, Indonesia.

Read more about Cuba's medical collaboration in Africa at:

- White Coats by the Gambia River

Cuba provides Medical Aid to Children Affected by Chernobyl Nuclear Accident:

- The children of Chernobyl in My Memory

== See also ==
- Censorship in Cuba
- Cocktail Wars
- Human rights in Cuba
- Intelligence Directorate
- List of diplomatic missions in Cuba
- List of diplomatic missions of Cuba
- Organization of Solidarity with the People of Asia, Africa and Latin America
