= Cuba–Syria relations =

Bilateral relations

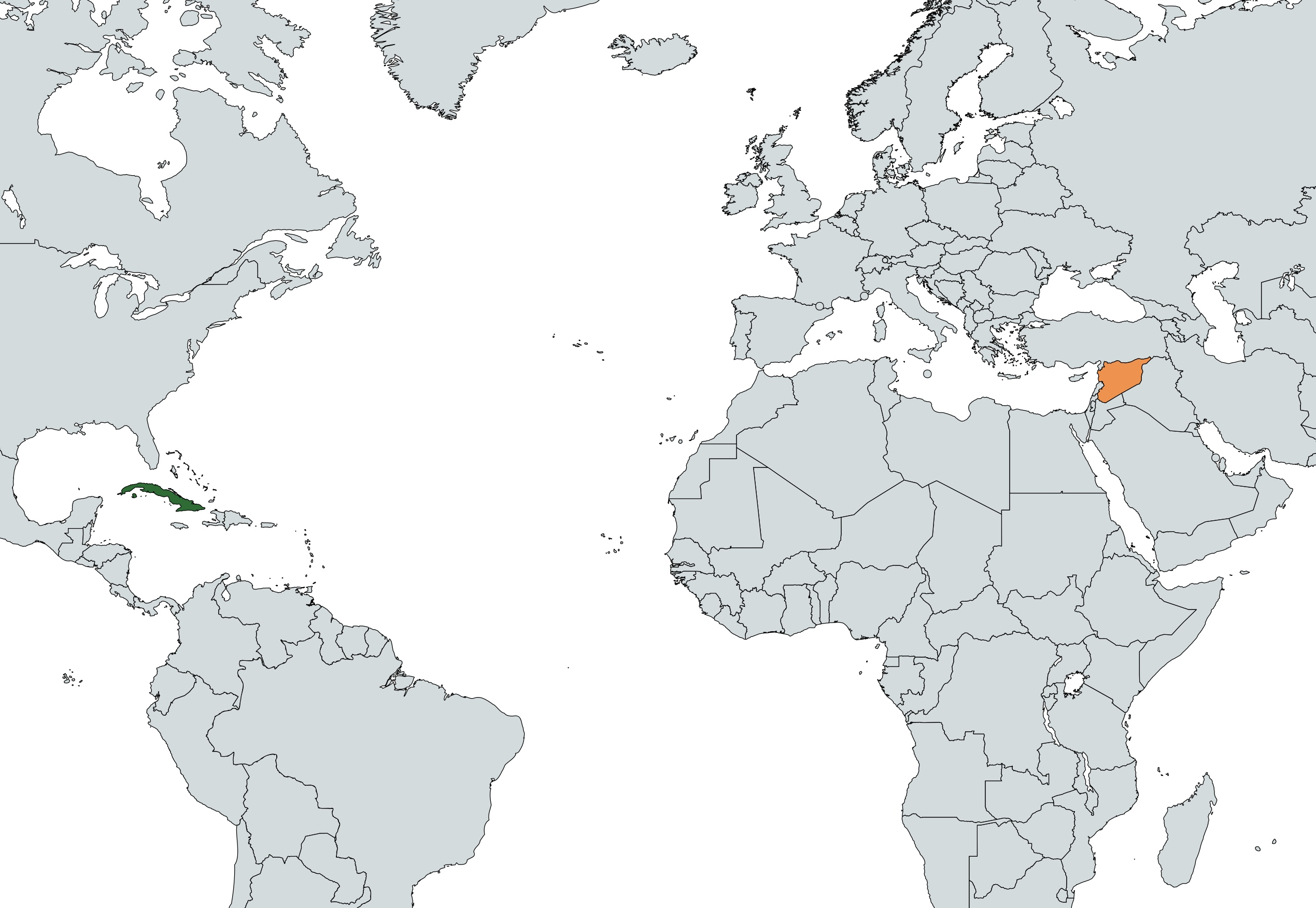

- Cuba: Syria

Diplomatic mission
- Cuban Embassy, Damascus: Syrian Embassy, Havana (Note: Also responsible for Syrian interests in the Bahamas, Dominica, and Jamaica.)

Cuba–Syria relations were established on 11 August 1965.

Both countries are members of the Non-Aligned Movement and have maintained a steady partnership focused on mutual support in international forums and cooperation in various sectors. Over the years, the two nations have aligned closely on issues related to sovereignty, opposition to Western influence, and solidarity on foreign policy matters.

== History ==
=== Early ties and Cold War era ===
Formal diplomatic relations between Cuba and Syria were established on 11 August 1965. During the Cold War, the two countries found common ground as they both aligned with the Soviet Union and opposed Western influence, particularly U.S. foreign policies. Cuba, under the leadership of Fidel Castro, and Syria, governed by the Ba'athist regime, shared ideological similarities rooted in socialism and anti-imperialism.

Cuban and Syrian support often manifested in mutual backing at United Nations assemblies and other international bodies. Both nations viewed their alliance as a form of resistance against perceived imperialism, especially given Cuba’s strained relations with the United States and Syria’s conflicts with Israel. Syria also supported Cuba's stance on the U.S. embargo, and Cuba consistently backed Syria in its claims over the Israeli-occupied Golan Heights.

=== Post-Cold War Period ===
Following the end of the Cold War and the dissolution of the Soviet Union, Cuba and Syria continued their alliance despite shifts in global geopolitics. There were many high-level visits and meetings to affirm continued support, marking a period of renewed diplomatic ties. Both nations continued to cooperate in the Non-Aligned Movement, emphasizing independence from Western influence. During this period, Cuba provided Syria with expertise in fields such as healthcare and education, while Syria voiced support for Cuba’s position against the U.S. embargo.

=== Relations during the Syrian Civil War ===
The onset of the Syrian Civil War in 2011 placed Syria in a challenging international position, with various countries either condemning or supporting the Syrian government. Cuba, however, remained a steadfast ally of the Assad government, emphasizing the importance of Syrian sovereignty and condemning foreign intervention. Cuban media frequently covered the Syrian conflict, highlighting the Syrian government's viewpoint and condemning what it described as Western-backed intervention.

In relation to the fall of the Assad regime in December 2024, the Cuban government stated that it was "monitoring the rapidly unfolding events in Syria with a great deal of concern".

== Cultural relations ==
Cultural relations between Cuba and Syria have been marked by occasional exchanges in the arts, music, and education, with talks on more cultural cooperation.

On 24 September 2019, Cuba's Minister of Culture, Alpidio Alonso, and the Syrian Ambassador to Cuba, Idris Maya, signed an agreement to expand cultural cooperation between the two countries. The agreement aimed to enhance collaboration across various artistic disciplines and heritage preservation initiatives.

== Diplomatic visits and agreements ==
Throughout the years, Cuba and Syria have engaged in several high-profile diplomatic visits to reinforce their bilateral ties, underscoring both nations' desire to deepen ties beyond ideological support.

In addition, the two countries have signed agreements to foster cultural exchange, particularly in medical training.

== Mutual cooperation ==
=== Political cooperation ===
Cuba and Syria have maintained a steady political alliance, frequently supporting each other in international settings. Both countries are vocal members of the Non-Aligned Movement and advocate for a multipolar world order. Cuba has consistently supported Syria’s position regarding the Israeli-occupied Golan Heights, while Syria has condemned the U.S. embargo on Cuba, seeing it as an unjust policy.

=== Economic cooperation ===
While economic cooperation between the two countries remains limited due to geographical distance and economic constraints, Cuba has provided technical support to Syria, especially in areas like healthcare and biotechnology. However, trade volumes between the two countries remain low, with cooperation primarily in the form of technical and humanitarian assistance rather than substantial economic exchange.

== See also ==
- Foreign relations of Cuba
- Foreign relations of Syria
