= Azerbaijan–Cuba relations =

Bilateral relations between Azerbaijan and Cuba

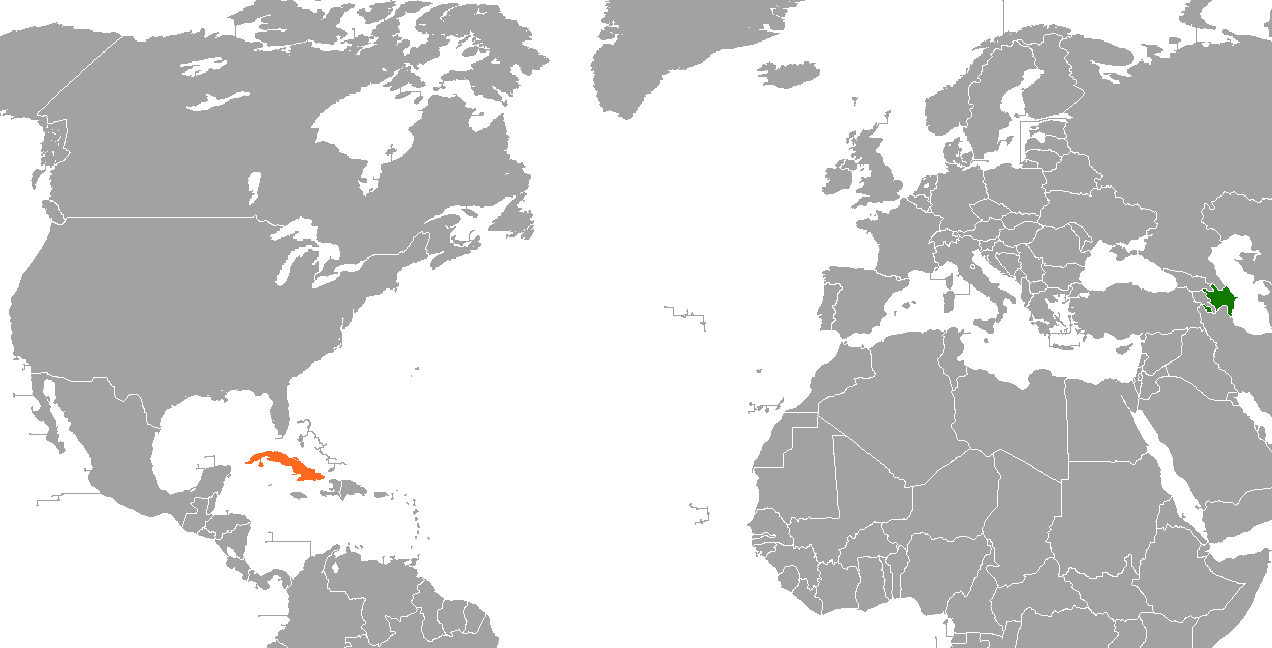

- Azerbaijan: Cuba

Azerbaijan–Cuba relations refers to the bilateral relations between Azerbaijan and Cuba. Azerbaijan has an embassy in Havana and Cuba has an embassy in Baku. Diplomatic relations between the two countries were established on March 27, 1992.

== High-level visits ==
On September 19, 2005, Azerbaijan Foreign Minister Elmar Mammadyarov, and Cuban Foreign Minister Fernando Rog during the framework of the 60th session of the UN General Assembly. On September 28–30, 2006, Mammadyarov paid an official visit to Cuba, and on February 8, 2011, Cuban Foreign Minister Bruno Rodríguez Parrilla paid an official visit to Azerbaijan. In October 2019, Cuban President Miguel Diaz-Canel paid an official visit to Azerbaijan to participate in the XVIII summit of the Non-Aligned Movement held in Baku.

== Inter-parliamentary relations ==
The Azerbaijani-Cuban inter-parliamentary working group operates in the Milli Majlis of Azerbaijan. The Cuban-Azerbaijani inter-parliamentary working group operates in the National Assembly (Parliament) of Cuba. The team leader is Elbis Perez Olivera. Ten documents have been signed between Azerbaijan and Cuba. The first session of the Cuba-Azerbaijan intergovernmental Commission was held in November 2007 in Havana. The second meeting of the intergovernmental Commission was held in November of the following year.

== Economic cooperation ==
In December 2007, during the visit of the Azerbaijani government delegation to Havana, the prospects of cooperation in the field of energy were discussed. In October 2010, the first joint Azerbaijani-Cuban business forum was held. The basis of imports to Azerbaijan are alcoholic beverages, cigars and tobacco products, handbags, postage stamps, etc. The basis of export from Azerbaijan is pneumatic rubber tires. More than 70% of the equipment at Cuban power plants was exported from Azerbaijan. Cuba is interested in cooperation in the oil and gas sector.

=== Trade turnover (in thousands of US dollars) ===
Year	Trade turnover	Import	Export
2013	7.9	7.9	0.00
2014	44.1	44.1	0.0
2015	74.6	68.8	5.8
2016	71	69.9	1.1
2017	223.3	223.27	0.02
2018	167.53	167.52	0.01

== Other areas ==
In 2008, about a hundred tourists from Azerbaijan visited Cuba. In December 2009, Cuba and Azerbaijan signed an agreement on the exchange of experience and joint activities in various sports events. A festival of Azerbaijani culture was held in Cuba in March 2010. Cooperation in the field of mobile communications and Internet service is underway. In the field of agriculture, cooperation covers such areas as cattle breeding, tobacco growing, tea growing, gardening, etc. In the fall of 2010, the Minister of communications and information technology of Azerbaijan, Ali Abbasov, took the initiative to build a computer manufacturing plant in Cuba. In the summer of 2017, at the initiative of the Vice-President of the Cuban Chess Federation, Carlos Rivera Gonzales, a Memorandum of understanding was signed between the chess federations of both countries. Currently, there are one hundred students from Cuba studying at the Azerbaijan State Oil Academy.

== See also ==
- Foreign relations of Azerbaijan
- Foreign relations of Cuba
