= List of diplomatic missions in Cuba =

This is a list of diplomatic missions in Cuba. At present, the capital city of Havana hosts 114 embassies. Several other countries have ambassadors accredited from other regional capitals. Its role as a promoter of Third World causes during the Cold War led to the development of close ties with many non-aligned and socialist-leaning countries around the globe, as evidenced by the presence in Havana of many embassies from financially poor and economically developing countries.

This listing excludes honorary consulates.

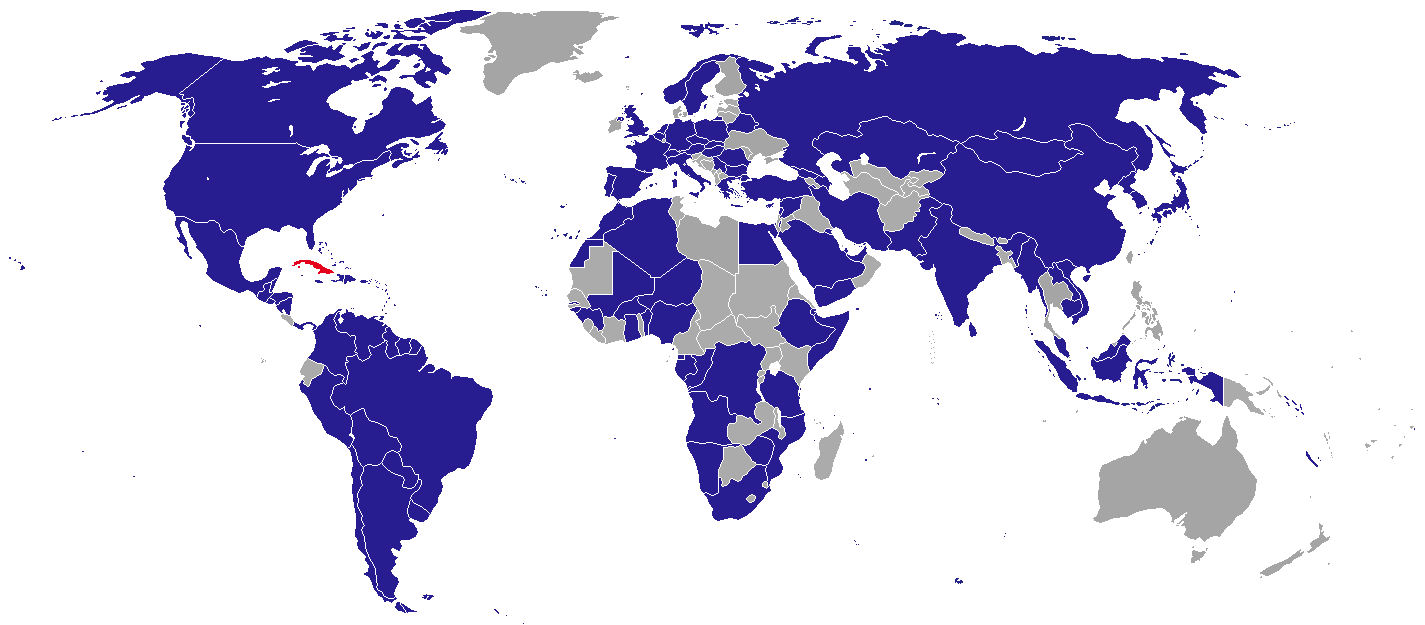
Diplomatic missions in Cuba

== Resident diplomatic missions in Havana ==
=== Embassies ===
1. Algeria
2. Angola
3. Antigua and Barbuda
4. Argentina
5. Austria
6. Azerbaijan
7. Bahamas
8. Barbados
9. Belarus
10. Belize
11. Benin
12. Bolivia
13. Brazil
14. Bulgaria
15. Burkina Faso
16. Cambodia
17. Canada
18. Cape Verde
19. Chile
20. China
21. Colombia
22. Congo-Brazzaville
23. Congo-Kinshasa
24. Cyprus
25. Czech Republic
26. Djibouti
27. Dominica
28. Dominican Republic
29. Egypt
30. El Salvador
31. Equatorial Guinea
32. Ethiopia
33. France
34. Gabon
35. Gambia
36. Georgia
37. Germany
38. Ghana
39. Greece
40. Grenada
41. Guatemala
42. Guinea
43. Guinea-Bissau
44. Guyana
45. Haiti
46. Holy See
47. Honduras
48. Hungary
49. India
50. Indonesia
51. Iran
52. Italy
53. Jamaica
54. Japan
55. Kazakhstan
56. Kuwait
57. Laos
58. Lebanon
59. Malaysia
60. Mali
61. Mexico
62. Mongolia
63. Morocco
64. Mozambique
65. Myanmar
66. Namibia
67. Netherlands
68. Nicaragua
69. Niger
70. Nigeria
71. North Korea
72. Norway
73. Pakistan
74. Palestine
75. Panama
76. Paraguay
77. Peru
78. Poland
79. Portugal
80. Qatar
81. Romania
82. Russia
83. Sahrawi Republic
84. Saint Kitts and Nevis
85. Saint Lucia
86. Saint Vincent and the Grenadines
87. Saudi Arabia
88. Serbia
89. Seychelles
90. Slovakia
91. Solomon Islands
92. Somalia
93. South Africa
94. South Korea
95. Sovereign Military Order of Malta
96. Spain
97. Sri Lanka
98. Suriname
99. Sweden
100. Switzerland
101. Syria
102. Tanzania
103. Timor-Leste
104. Trinidad and Tobago
105. Turkey
106. Uganda
107. United Arab Emirates
108. United Kingdom
109. United States
110. Uruguay
111. Venezuela
112. Vietnam
113. Yemen
114. Zimbabwe

=== Delegations and other representative offices ===
1. European Union (Delegation)
2. United Nations (Resident Coordinator's Office)

== Consular missions ==
=== Havana ===
- Mexico (Consulate)
- Spain (Consulate-General)

=== Camagüey ===
- Spain (Consulate-General)

== Gallery ==
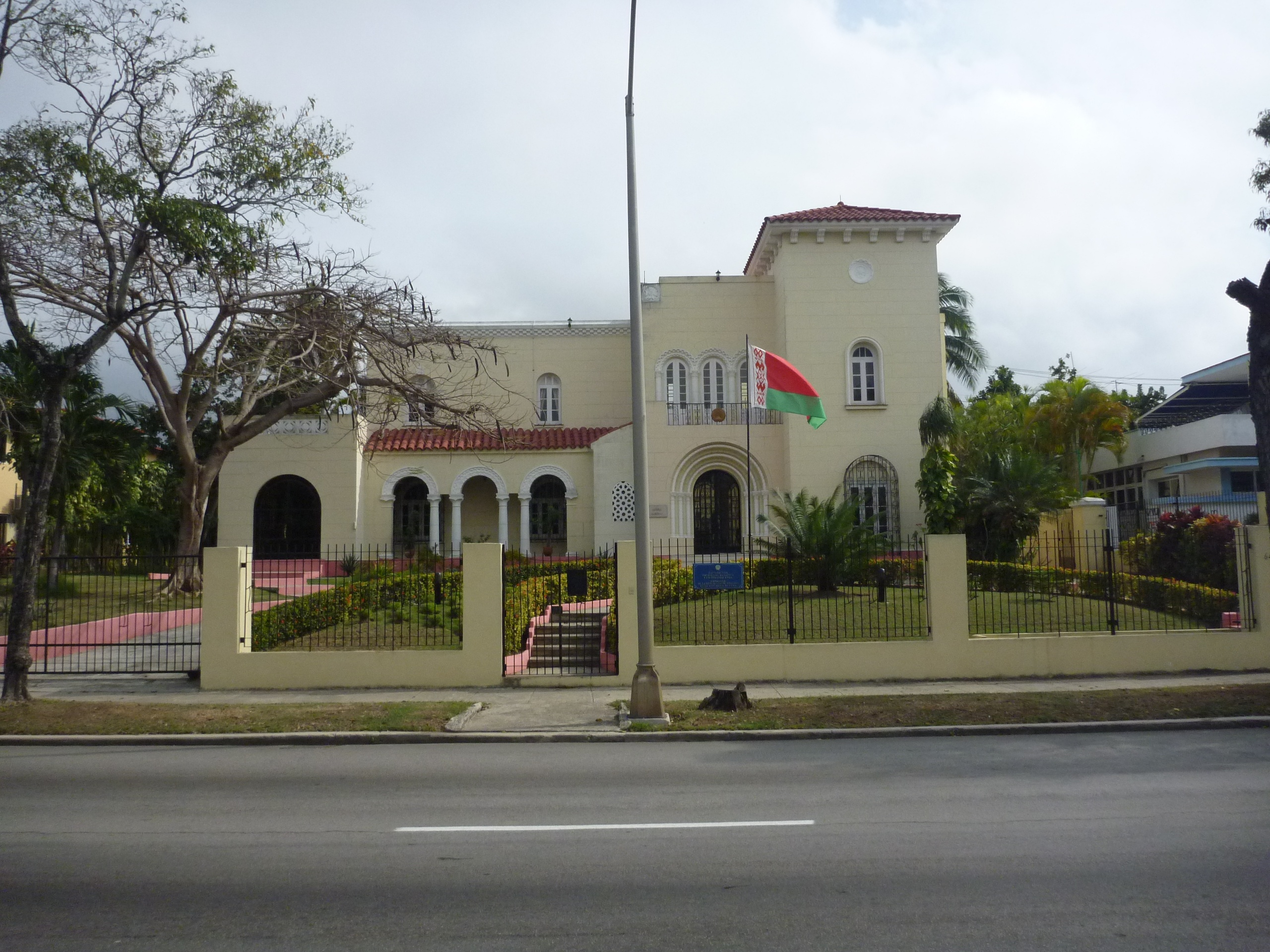
Embassy of Belarus

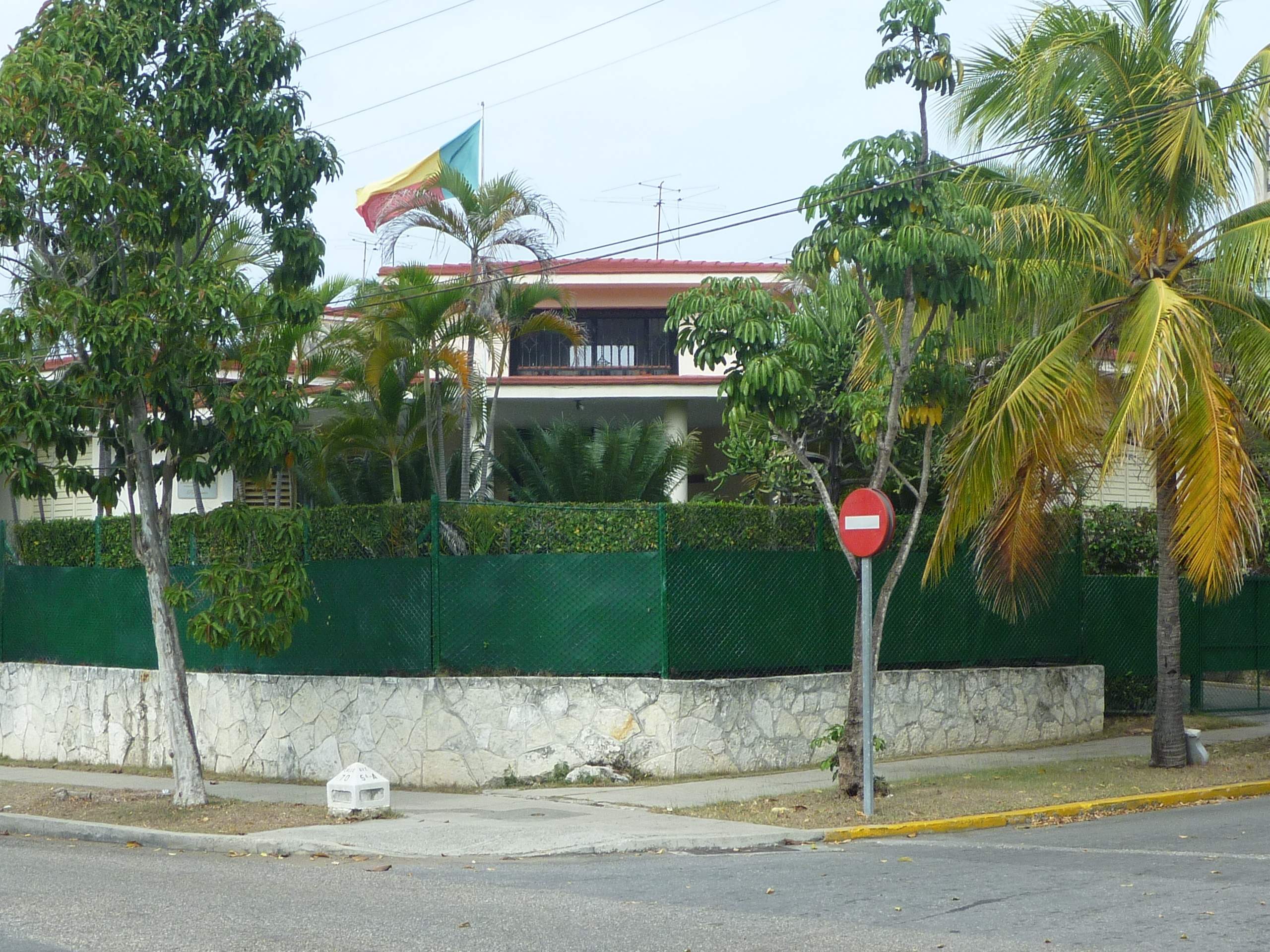
Embassy of Benin

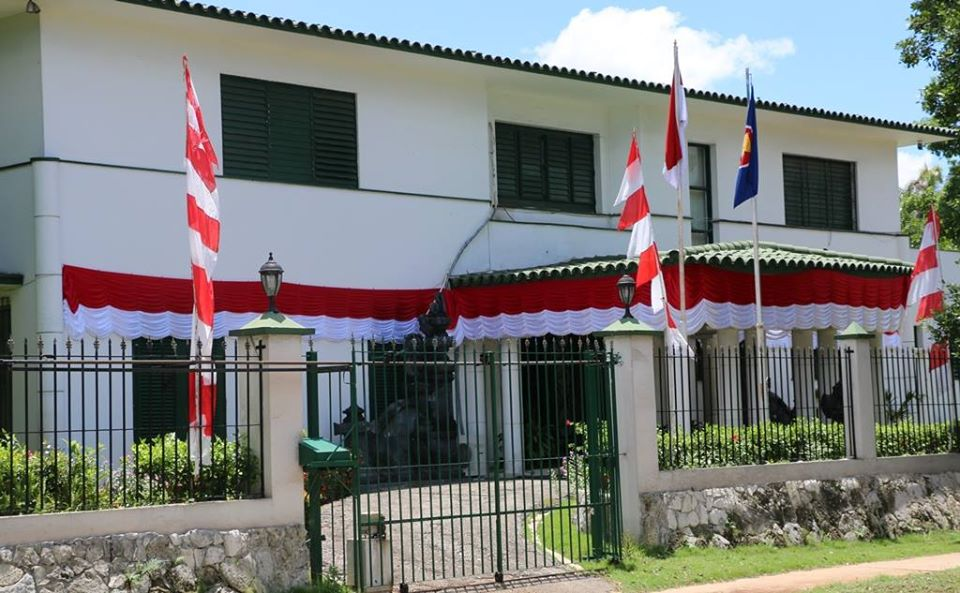
Embassy of Indonesia

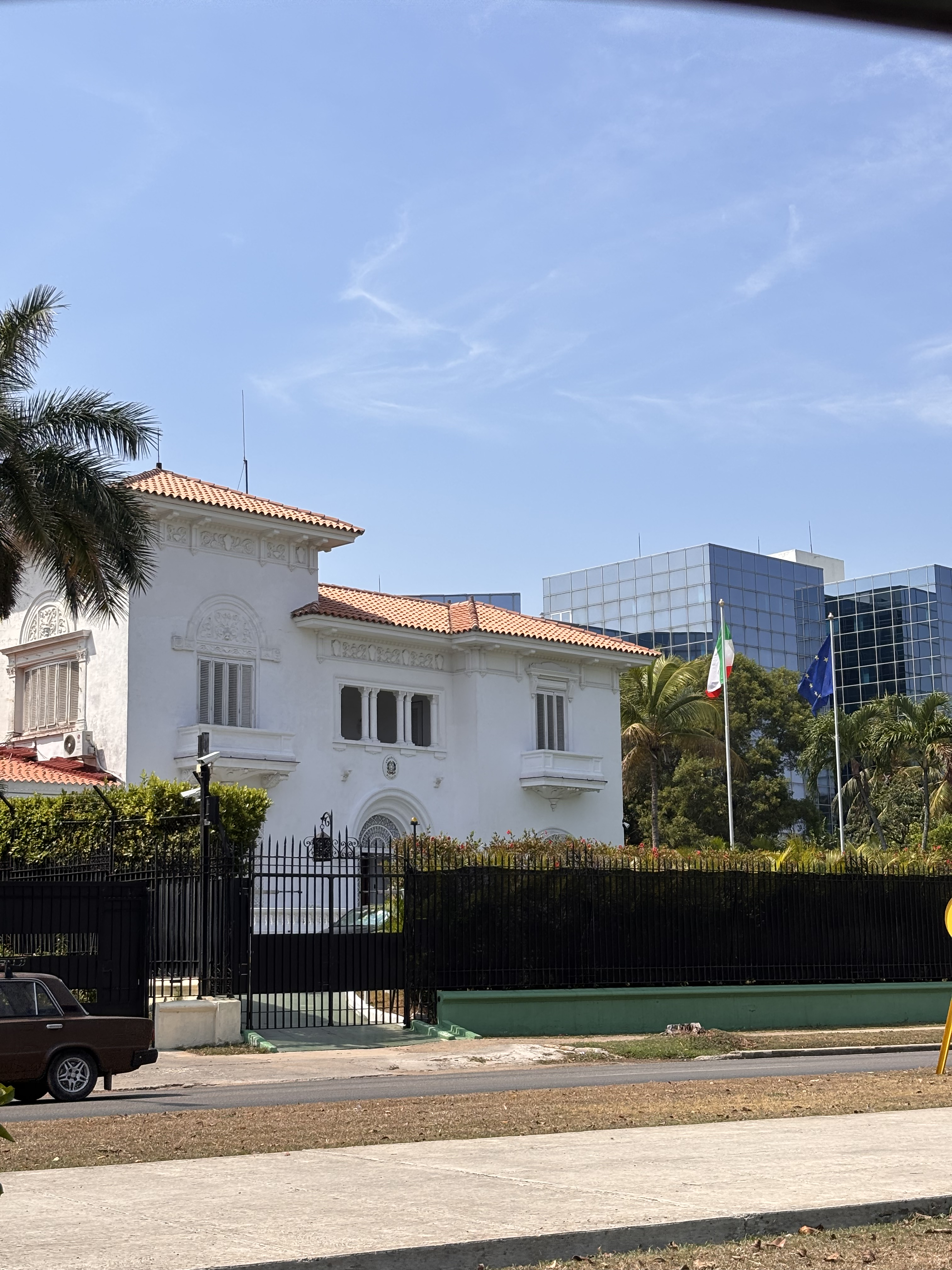
Embassy of Italy

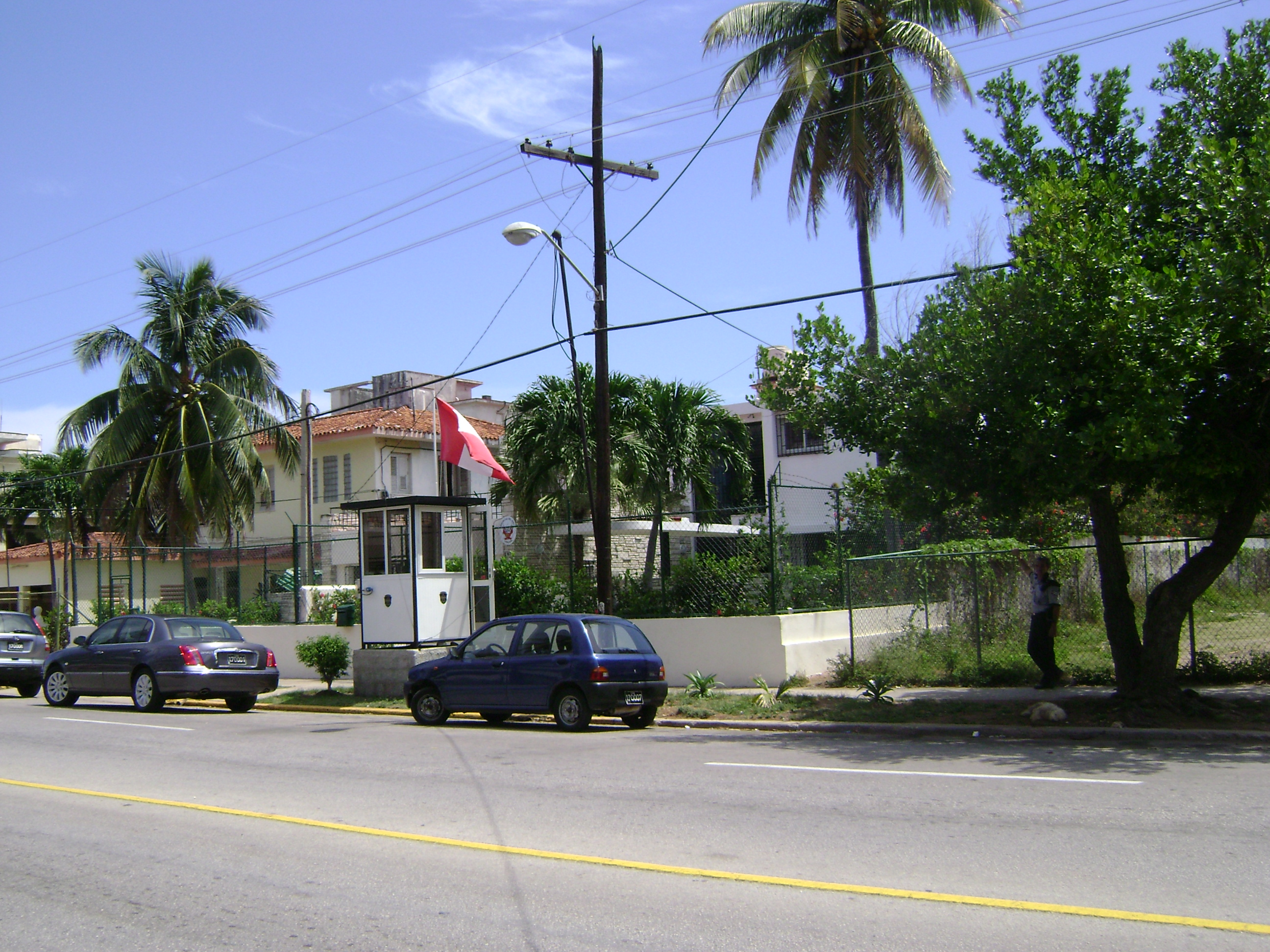
Embassy of Peru

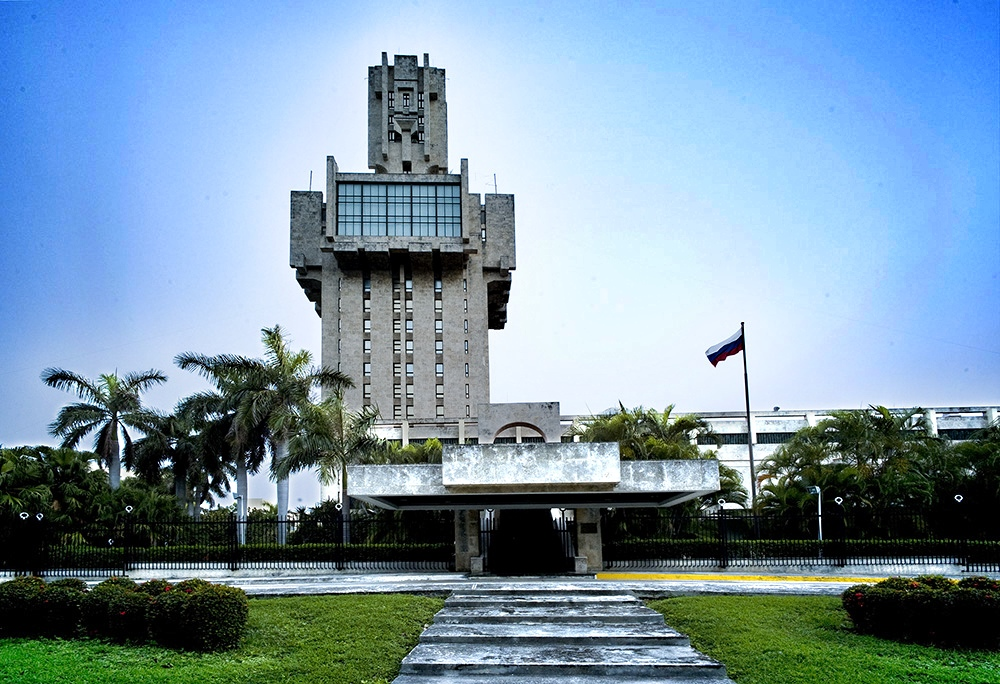
Embassy of Russia

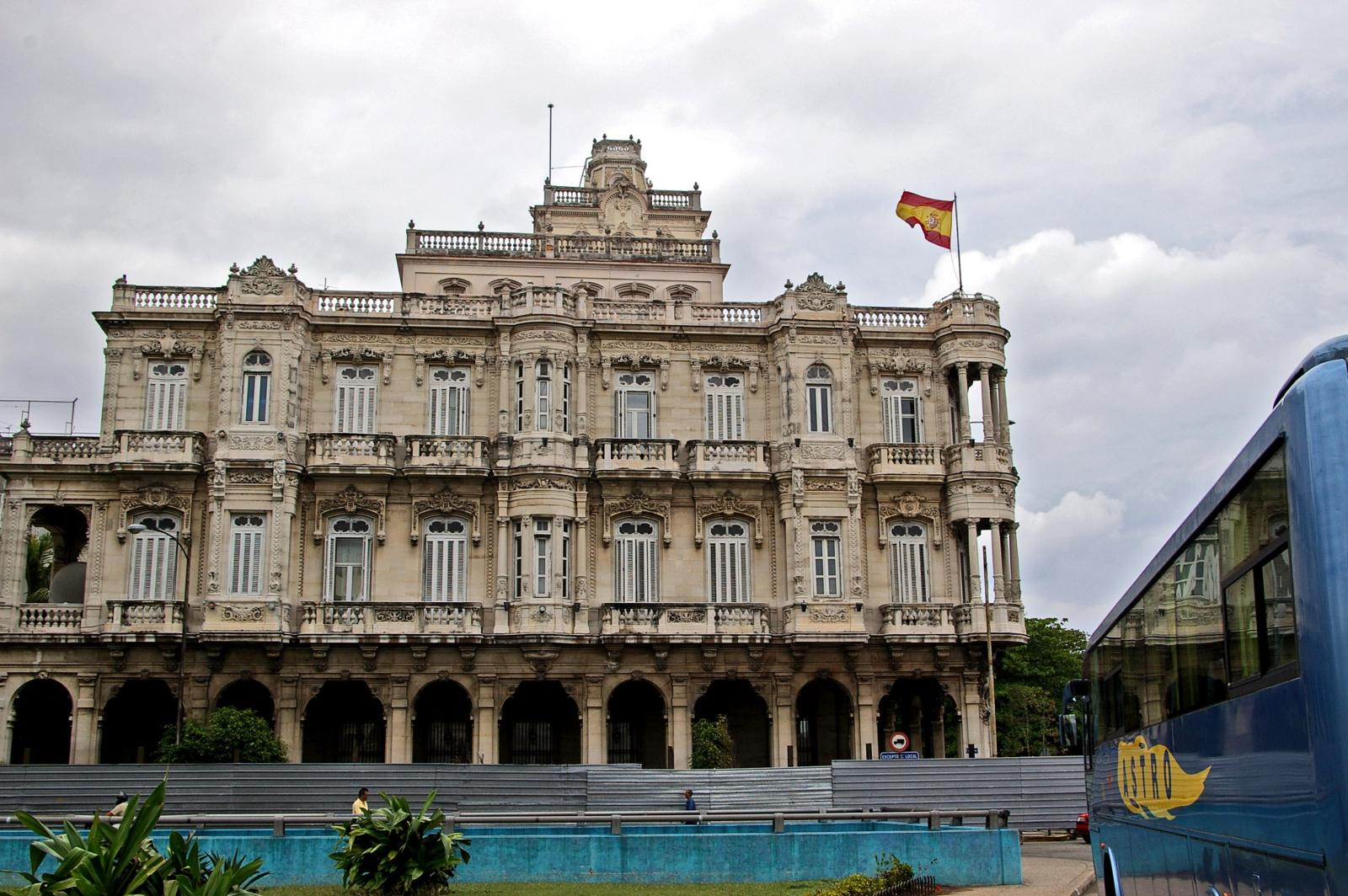
Embassy of Spain

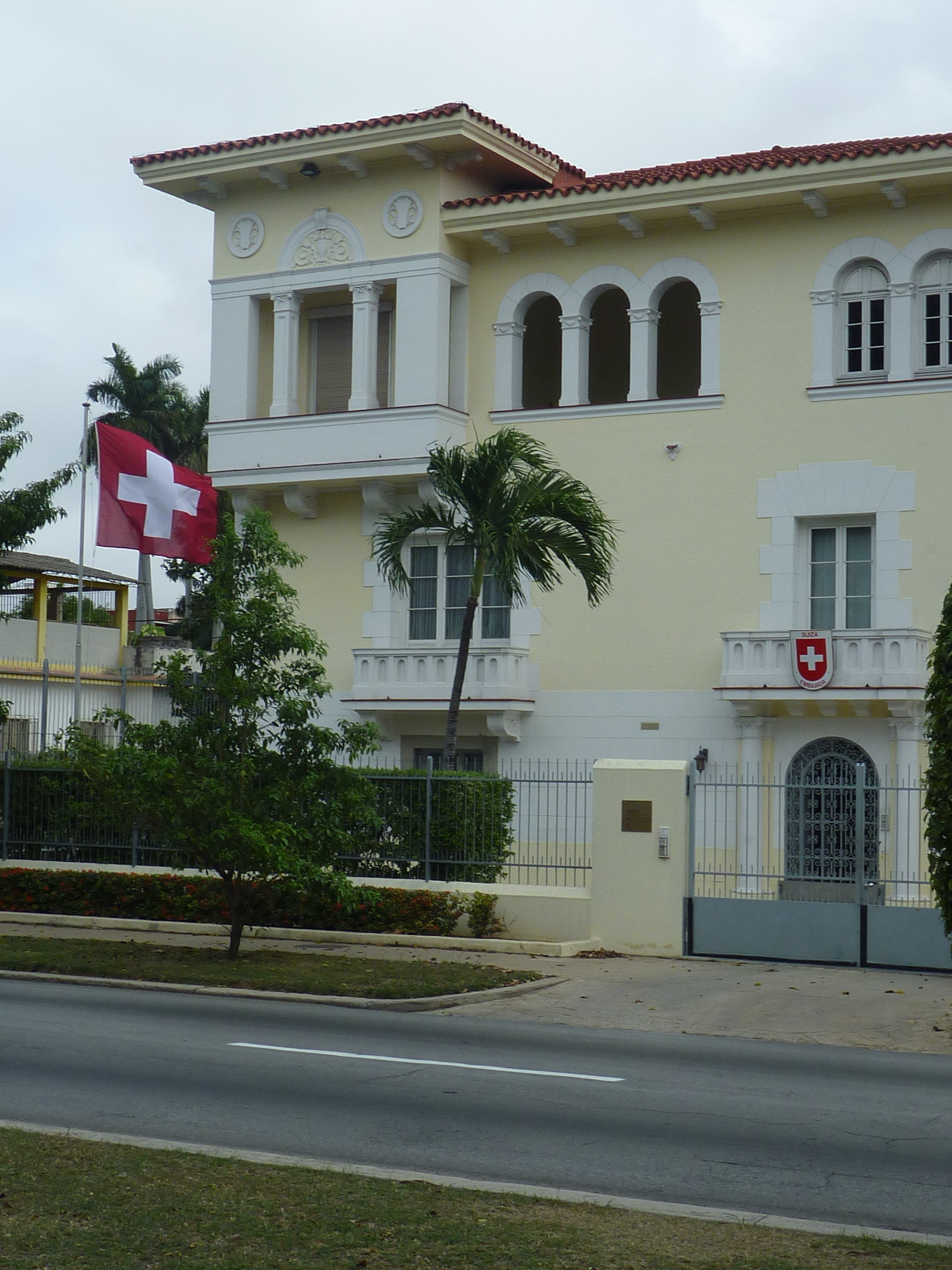
Embassy of Switzerland

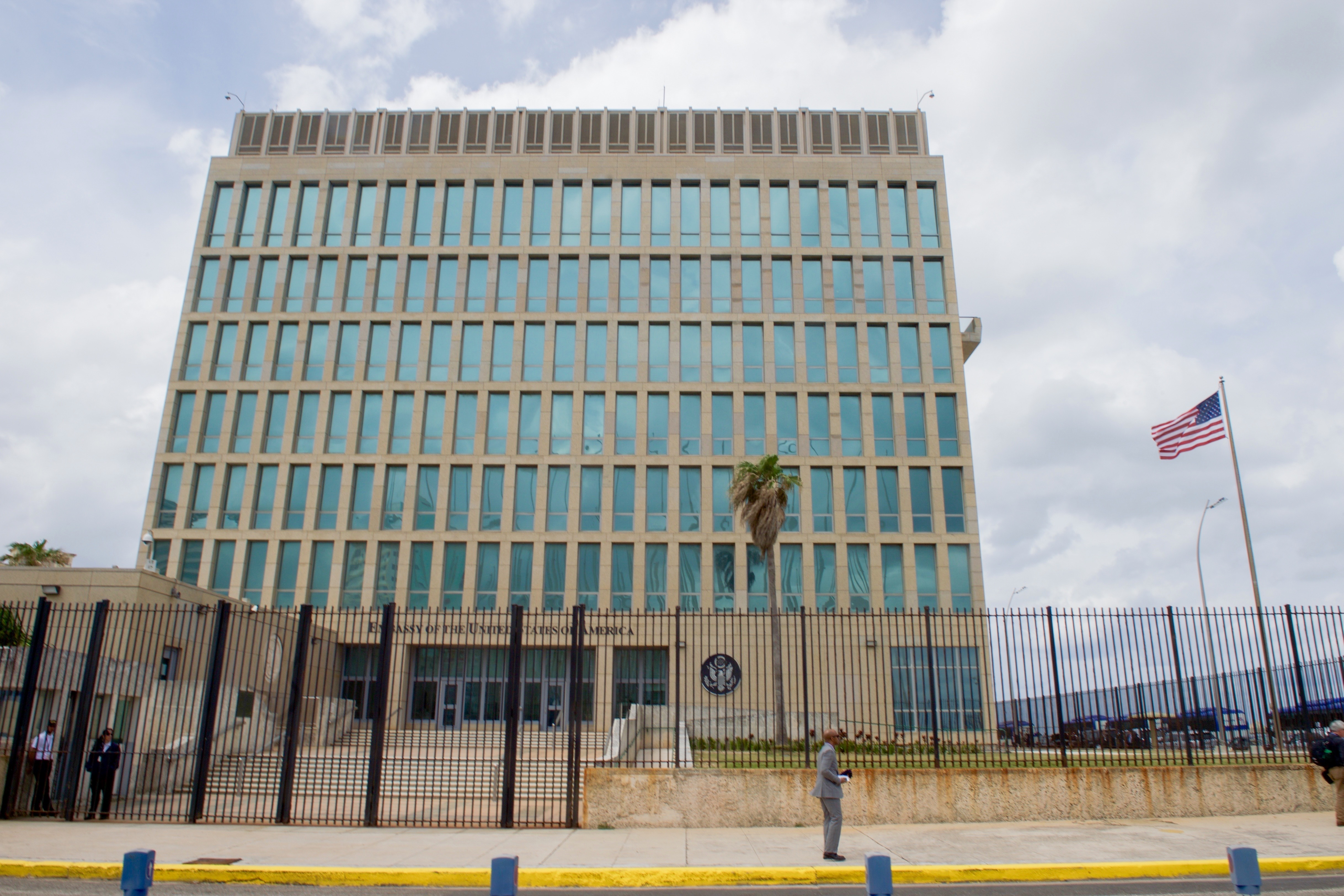
Embassy of the United States

== Non-resident embassies accredited to Cuba ==
=== Resident in Mexico City, Mexico ===
1. Australia
2. Denmark
3. Finland
4. Ireland
5. Ivory Coast
6. New Zealand
7. Philippines
8. Thailand

=== Resident in New York City, United States ===
The following entries are the sending countries's permanent missions to the United Nations

1. Albania
2. Bahrain
3. Botswana
4. Brunei
5. Comoros
6. Eswatini
7. Iceland
8. Jordan
9. Mauritania
10. Mauritius
11. Montenegro
12. Nauru
13. Papua New Guinea
14. Tonga
15. Turkmenistan
16. Tuvalu
17. Uzbekistan

=== Resident in Ottawa, Canada ===
1. Armenia
2. Bosnia and Herzegovina
3. Lesotho
4. Madagascar
5. Nepal
6. Rwanda
7. Senegal
8. Slovenia
9. Tunisia
10. Zambia

=== Resident in Washington, D.C., United States ===
1. Afghanistan
2. Chad
3. Oman
4. Togo

=== Resident elsewhere ===
1. Belgium (Panama City)
2. Croatia (Madrid)
3. Iraq (Caracas)
4. Kenya (Kingston)
5. Malawi (Brasília)
6. Singapore (Singapore)
7. Sudan (Caracas)

== Embassies to open ==
- Libya
- Philippines

== Closed missions ==
Host City	Sending country	Mission	Year closed	Ref.
Havana	Albania	Embassy	Unknown	
Havana	Belgium	Embassy	2025	
Havana	Costa Rica	Embassy	2026	
Havana	East Germany	Embassy	1990 (Note: Existed as a commercial mission in between 1960 and 1963, when it opened as an embassy after formal diplomatic relations were established.)	
Havana	Ecuador	Embassy	2026	
Havana	Israel	Embassy (Note: Under the protecting power of Canada.)	1973	
Havana	Kenya	Embassy	2026	
Havana	Libya	Embassy	2011	
Havana	Philippines	Embassy	2012	
Havana	Sierra Leone	Embassy	1983	
Havana	Ukraine	Embassy	2025	

== See also ==
- Foreign relations of Cuba
- List of diplomatic missions of Cuba
- Visa policy of Cuba
