= Cuba–Greece relations =

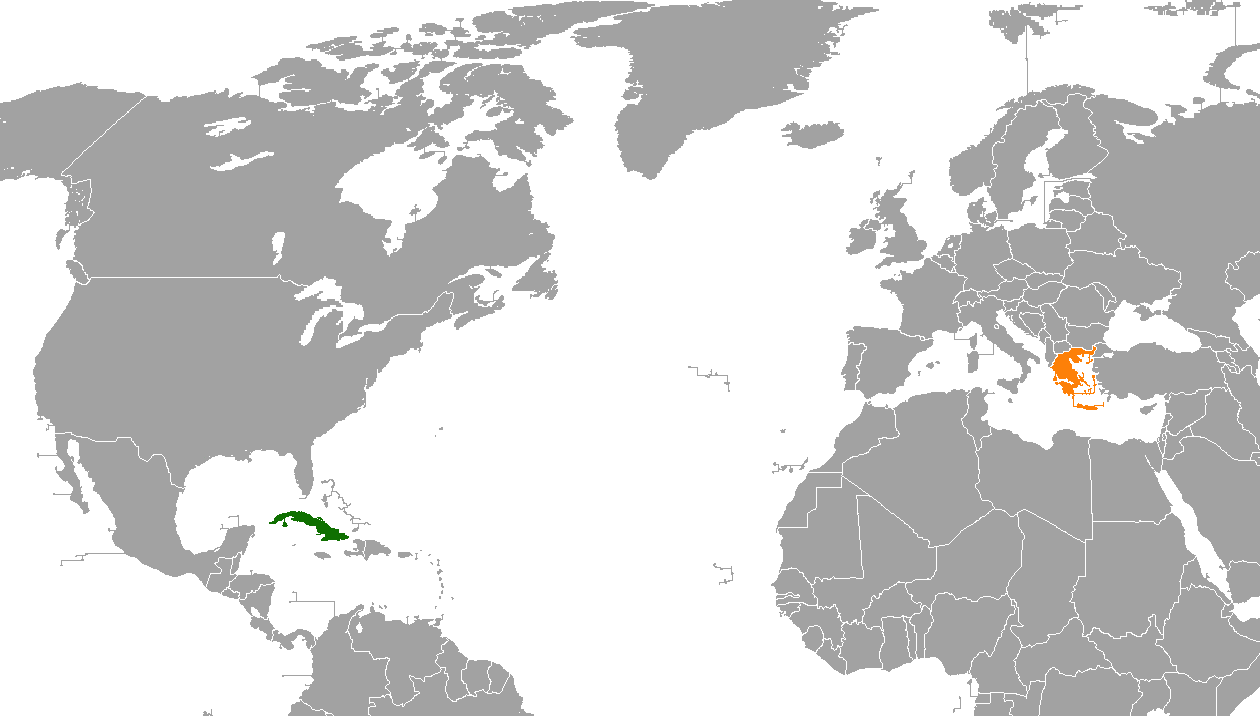

- Cuba: Greece

Cuba has an embassy in Athens and Greece has an embassy in Havana. Greek positions on matters concerning Cuba are elaborated jointly with other European Union members.

== History ==
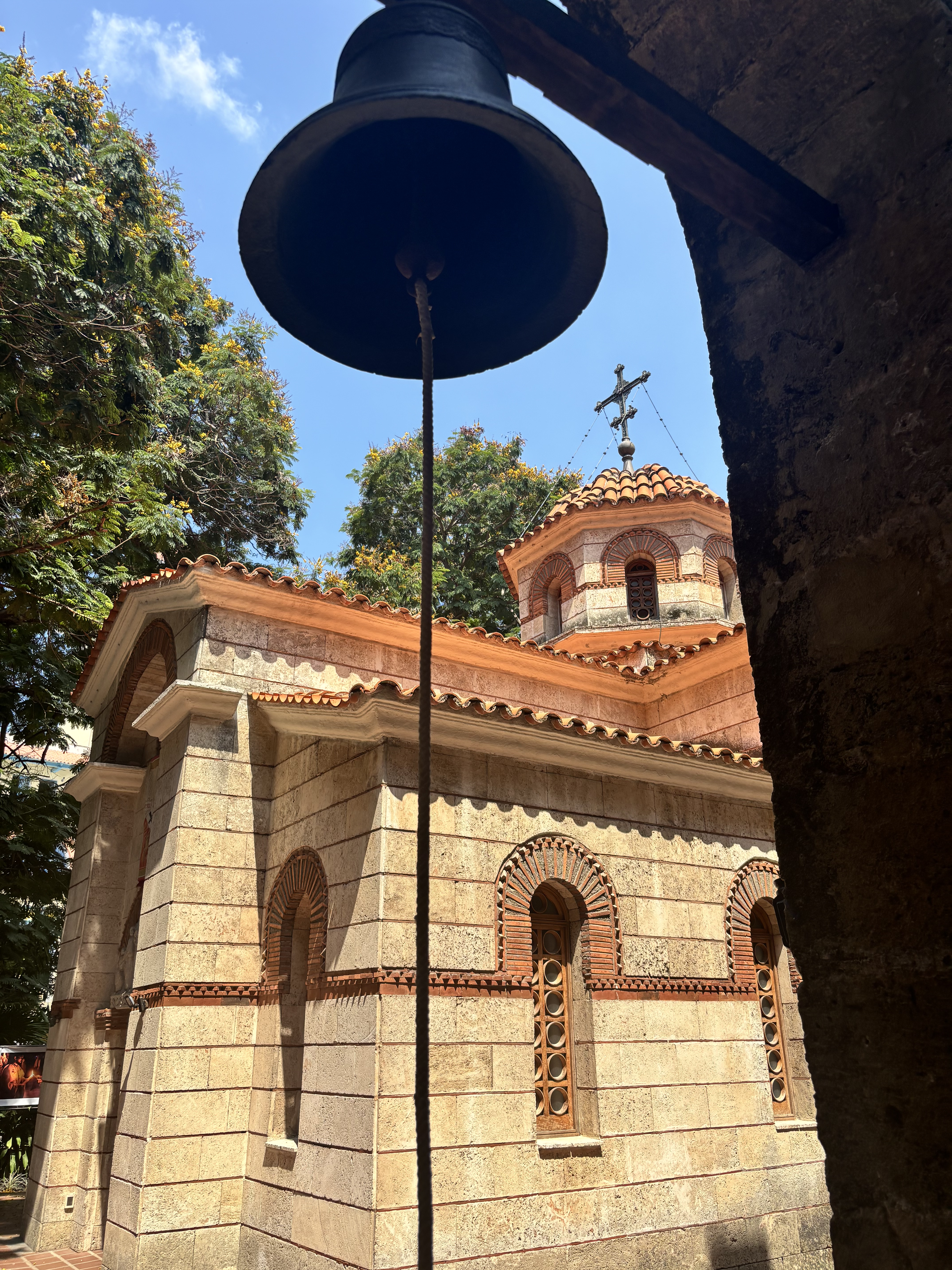
St. Nikolaos Greek Orthodox Church in Havana, in 2025

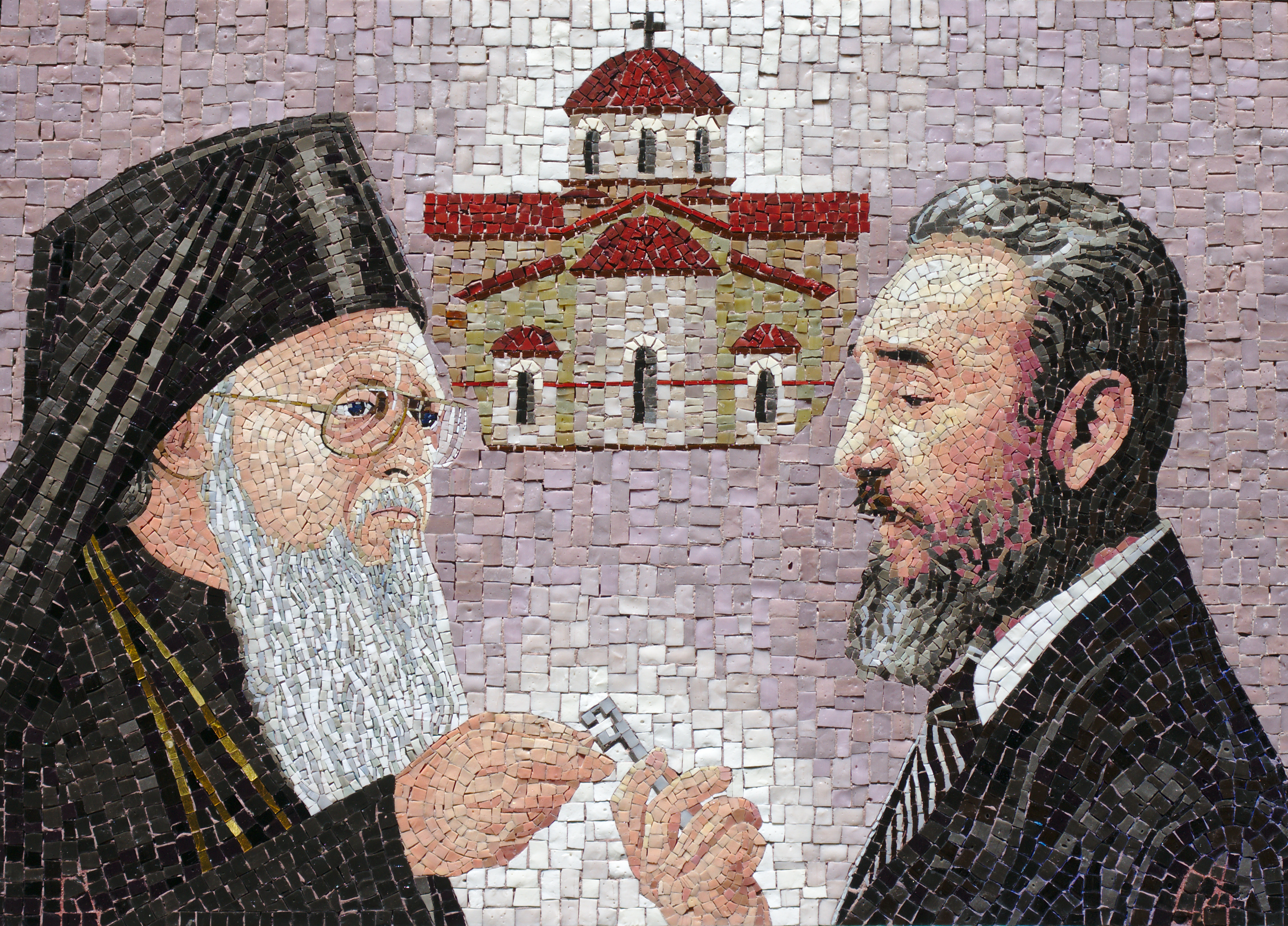
Mosaic depicting the handover of the keys by Fidel Castro to Patriarch Bartholomew

There are between 30 and 50 people of Greek descent in Cuba. They are located mostly in Havana, where there is a Greek embassy. In 2004, Cuba built its first church in 43 years, the St. Nikolaos Greek Orthodox Church in Old Havana. It serves Havana's estimated 8,000 Orthodox Christians, 50 of whom are Greek. Cuba's first Greek Orthodox church, Saints Constantine and Helen, was built in 1950 but was never used for church services. As of 2004, it remained the home of a children's theater company, despite diplomatic efforts by Giorgos Kostoulas, Greece's ambassador to Cuba, to return the church to its original purpose.

The Greek Prime Minister Alexis Tsipras was one of 30 political leaders, and the only one in Europe, to attend Fidel Castro's funeral in 2016.

== See also ==
- Foreign relations of Cuba
- Foreign relations of Greece
