= Cuba–Iran relations =

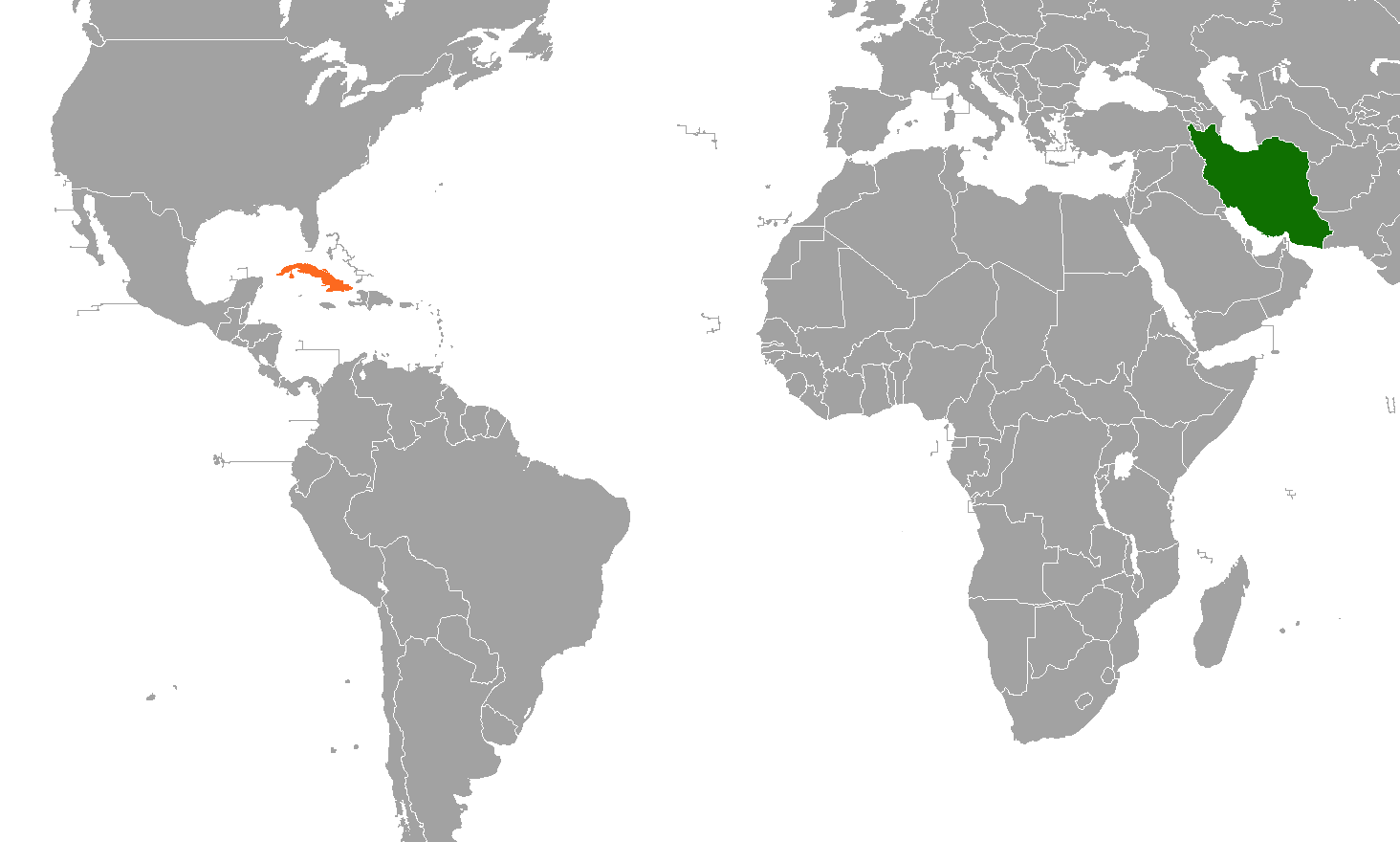

- Cuba: Iran

Diplomatic mission
- Cuban embassy, Tehran: Iranian embassy, Havana

Cuba–Iran relations, which are characterized by economic and diplomatic cooperation, are quite friendly. Iran has a productive trade balance with Cuba. The two governments signed a document to bolster cooperation in Havana in January 2006. President Mahmoud Ahmadinejad called relations "firm and progressive" over the past three decades.

== Background ==
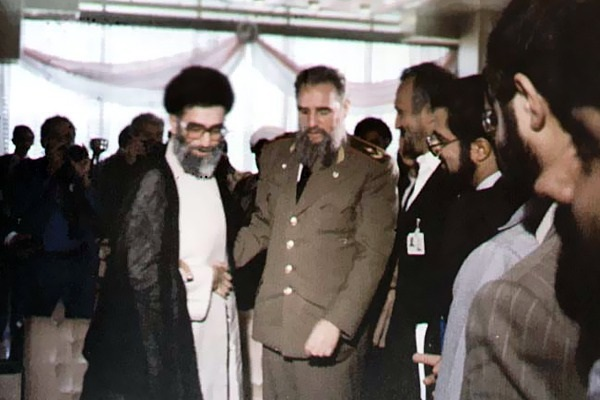
President Ali Khamenei in Eighth Summit of the Non-Aligned Movement, Harare with Fidel Castro.

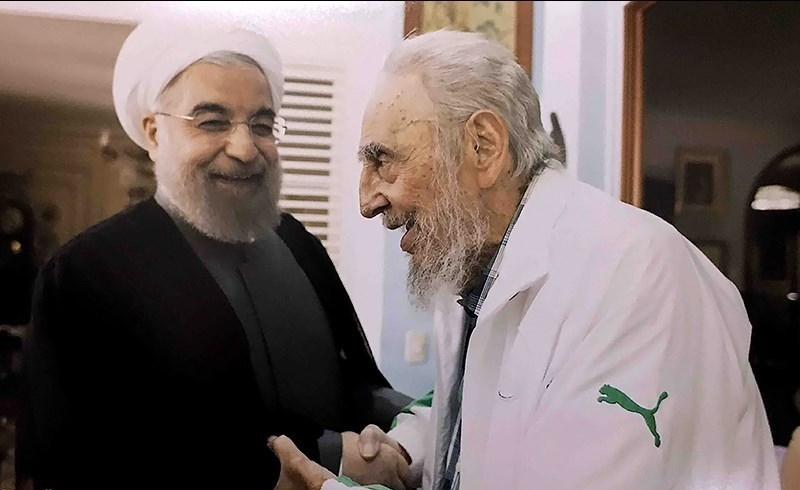
Fidel Castro and Hassan Rouhani in 2016

According to the Christian Science Monitor, relations had been growing "has been under way for some years prior to Ahmadinejad's ascendancy to the presidency." Observers of Cuba point to the fact that Cuba hosts an Iranian electronic jamming station outside Havana which is used to block broadcasting by the US-backed Radio Marti. Iran also worked with Cuba expertise to jam American broadcasting into its borders. Cuba has also helped build a genetic laboratory in Iran.

== Trade ==
According to the above-mentioned January 2006 document, Iran and Cuba expanded cooperation in several commercial, banking, agriculture, health and cultural fields. The two countries also stated they will expand cooperation in areas of the sugar industry, fishery, biotechnology, sports, transportation, development projects, investment, tourism, information technology and communications and water resources.

The document asks for Iran and Cuba to provide more facilities in banking cooperation with an aim of promoting economic and trade ties and making use of mutual scientific, research and industrial capabilities. In 2006 trading between the two countries reached US$5 million.

In 2008, Iran granted Cuba a 200-million-Euro credit line to undertake several different projects; a large part of that money was dedicated to financing Cuban imports of railroad wagons, both for cargo and passengers.

== Nuclear energy ==
Cuba supports Iran's program to develop nuclear technology for peaceful purposes, though the countries agreed to stop the proliferation of nuclear weapons. Former President of Cuba Fidel Castro spoke admiringly of Iran, "increasing its ability to fight big powers by the day."

In June 2025, the United States bombed three nuclear sites in Iran. Cuban President Miguel Díaz-Canel strongly condemned the attack, describing it as a serious violation of the UN Charter. He also stated that the actions of the United States were "plung[ing] humanity into a crisis with irreversible consequences."

== See also ==
- Foreign relations of Cuba
- Foreign relations of Iran
