= Cuba–Iraq relations =

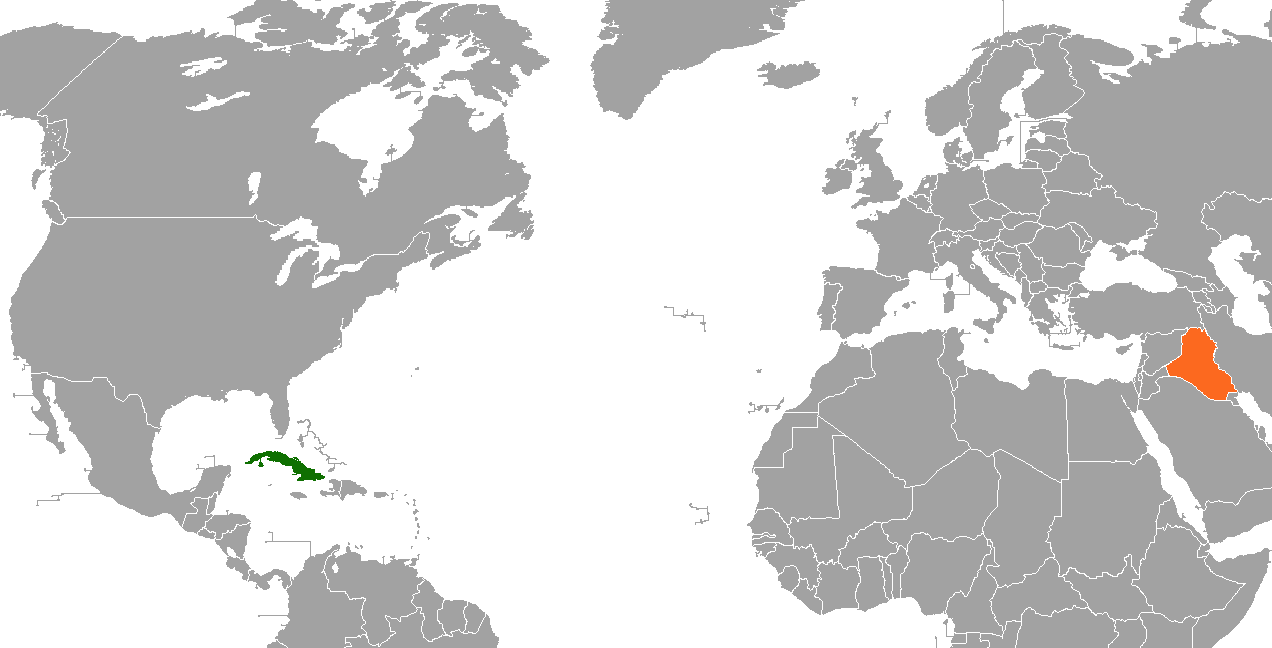

- Cuba: Iraq

Cuba–Iraq relations refers to the current and historical relationship between Cuba and Iraq. Cuba's friendly relations with Iraq dated back to the Non Aligned Movement meeting held in Cuba 1979. Fidel Castro even provided doctors to perform back surgery on Saddam Hussein.

== History ==
=== Timeline of the 90s ===
- 13 September 1996

Rodrigo Alvarez Cambras, president of the Cuba-Iraq Friendship Society, meets with Saddam Hussein on his trip to Baghdad to discuss health and trade relations.

- 2 November 1996

Iraq and Cuba sign an agreement calling for coordination in international forums and organisations in Havana. The Cuban deputy foreign minister states "The advanced relations with Iraq are the result of the determination displayed by the presidents and two parties in the two countries."

- 1 June 1997

Rodrigo Alvarez Cambra confirms that Saddam Hussein has been his patient over the last two decades, stating that he has developed a "close relationship with Saddam" in the time they worked together.

- 17 June 1997

Alvarez Cambra discusses Saddam's medical condition stating that he led a group of specialists to Iraq twenty times over the past two decades in order to treat Saddam.

- 19 April 1998

Cuba and Iraq sign an economic and technical cooperation protocol to increase the sale of Cuban medicine to Iraq, and cooperation in the health sector.

- 14 August 1998

Alvarez Cambra returns to Cuba from Iraq, where he met with Saddam Hussein and Tariq Aziz (the former minister of foreign affairs, minister of public health and minister of economy). He states "we talked about cooperation issues, above all in the health sector. Their minister of public health recently came here and we will begin a broad cooperation between Cuba and Iraq."

- 11 March 1999

An Iraqi parliamentary delegation finishes an official trip to Cuba, during which they visited Cuba's Frank Pais Scientific Research Center and the Molecular Immunology Research Center.

== Diplomatic Missions ==
- Cuba is accredited to Iraq from its embassy in Tehran, Iran.
- Iraq is accredited to Cuba from its embassy in Mexico City, Mexico.

== See also ==
- Foreign relations of Cuba
- Foreign relations of Iraq
