= Colombia–Cuba relations =

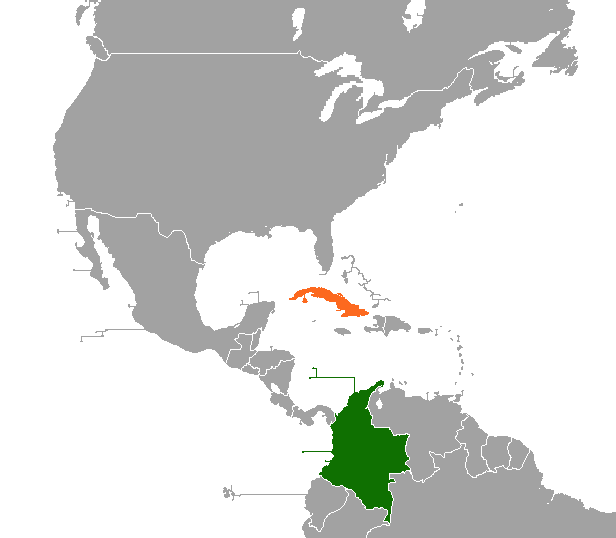

- Colombia: Cuba

Colombia–Cuba relations have a long history, as the two countries have shared political, economic, social and cultural relations since the time of colonialism in Latin America. Having a great exchange of knowledge and people in these territories, for this reason, the two countries and others joined in the fight for independence against the Spanish. Both countries are members of the Organization of American States, Community of Latin American and Caribbean States, Latin American Integration Association and Organization of Ibero-American States.

== History ==
=== Colonialism and independence ===
The union of these two countries dates back to the colonial era of Spain, considering that all the ships that merchants sailed from the island of Cuba during the colonial era arrived at the port of Cartagena with various products that were exported to Europe, such as sugar, biscuits and honey, horses, tobacco, leather and fat. It is known that the interdependence of Colombia and Cuba is very strong, since they depend mainly on imported products from any of their divisions, in the case of Colombia since the beginning of the 17th century it depended mainly on copper obtained from the island to create various artifacts necessary for Cartagena and the rest of the country.

As a result of the close economic ties between the two colonies, other relations were established between them such as social, political and cultural. A great reference to this point comes from the first period of New Granada in 1771, when Cuban journalist Manuel del Socorro Rodríguez played an important role in the foundation of this first period and who carried out a great work of knowledge at the head of the Public Library of Santa Fe de Bogotá. Similarly, a resident of New Granada, Joaquín Pablo Posada, the great precursor of socialism in Latin America, moved to Cuba in 1859, where he carried out a great work in the deployment of the Havana press in the territory of the island. From the above, due to the close relationship that the two colonies had and the exchange of different aspects leads to the strengthening of the alliance for the wars of independence.

=== Cold War - Cuban Revolution ===
Already during the Cuban Revolution, the flight of Fulgencio Batista was celebrated in Colombia, seen in terms of the end of the recent dictatorship in Colombia, without direct involvement, except when shortly after its success the revolutionaries invaded the Colombian embassy in search of anti-revolutionary elements, but the relationship with the new government changed when it began to show pro-Soviet elements and hostility towards the United States, and Colombia began to call various anti-Cuban meetings, and after one of these held in 1961 in Uruguay, the regime was condemned and expelled from the OAS; after which Fidel Castro made a strong speech against Colombia, three days later the government of Alberto Lleras Camargo broke relations with the island.

Cuba was a great supporter of the guerrillas that emerged in Colombian territory; it was involved in the founding of the NLA guerrilla group, formed by individuals who had been in Cuba, and the delivery of weapons. Another group that Cuba helped was the M-19, with constant communications between Fidel Castro and guerrilla leaders, to whom an attempt was made to deliver weapons on the coast of Chocó, an attempt that failed. Relations were reestablished when Colombia joined the Non-Aligned Movement. During the course of the peace agreements with the FARC, the Cuban government provided all its support and the negotiations took place in Havana, this being the country that would host the negotiations, one of the observer nations and providing health, security and transportation, which benefited the first informal discussions.

=== Diplomatic relations between Colombia and Cuba ===
Bilateral diplomatic relations between Colombia and Cuba were established in 1902, after their definitive independence. Diplomatic relations between Colombia and Cuba are based on mutual respect and respect for international law.

The diplomatic relationship between the Colombian government and the Cuban regime is marked by a paradox: the distancing and reconciliation between Havana and Bogotá always occurred under liberal governments. Colombia broke diplomatic relations with Cuba for the last time on March 23, 1981, due to the hostile behavior of the Cuban government towards this country, described by then-president Julio César Turbay Ayala. In a televised address, the president said that the decision was due to the proven complicity of Havana with the Colombian guerrilla.

In August 2026, the outgoing leftist Colombian President Gustavo Petro visited Cuba as his last presidential foreign visit, while the incoming right-wing president-elect Abelardo de la Espriella had declared plans to cut Colombian diplomatic relations with Cuba, declaring "there will be no relations with dictatorial regimes.”

== Bilateral agreements ==
The two countries have signed bilateral agreements such as the Extradition Treaty between Colombia and Cuba (1932); Agreement on cooperation in education and culture between Colombia and Cuba (1978); Agreement on economic and scientific-technical cooperation between the Republic of Colombia and the Republic of Cuba (1980); Memorandum of Understanding on Judicial Cooperation (1991); Partial Scope Agreement between the Republic of Colombia and the Republic of Cuba (1994); Tourism cooperation agreement between the Government of the Republic of Colombia and the Government of the Republic of Cuba (1995); Agreement between the Government of the Republic of Colombia and the Government of the Republic of Cuba on mutual legal assistance in criminal matters, done in Havana (1998); Cooperation agreement between the Government of the Republic of Colombia and the Government of the Republic of Cuba for the prevention, control and repression of illicit trafficking in narcotic drugs and psychotropic substances and related crimes (1999); Economic Complementarity Agreement No. 49 between the Republic of Colombia and the Republic of Cuba (2002) and the Economic Complementation Agreement No. 49 between the Republic of Colombia and the Republic of Cuba (2008).

== Economic relations ==
Colombia and Cuba have a trade relationship, with Cuba's exports to Colombia having a total value of around 8 million US dollars, mainly consisting of agro-industrial products, and those from Colombia to Cuba having a value of approximately 37 million dollars, mainly consisting of products from the petrochemical industry. There is also a small flow of visitors, with 9,585 residents of the island going to Colombia, and 27,146 Colombians going to Cuba, all in 2018.

== Diplomatic representation ==
- Colombia has an embassy in Havana.
- Cuba has an embassy in Bogotá.

== See also ==
- Foreign relations of Colombia
- Foreign relations of Cuba
