= Cuba–Kenya relations =

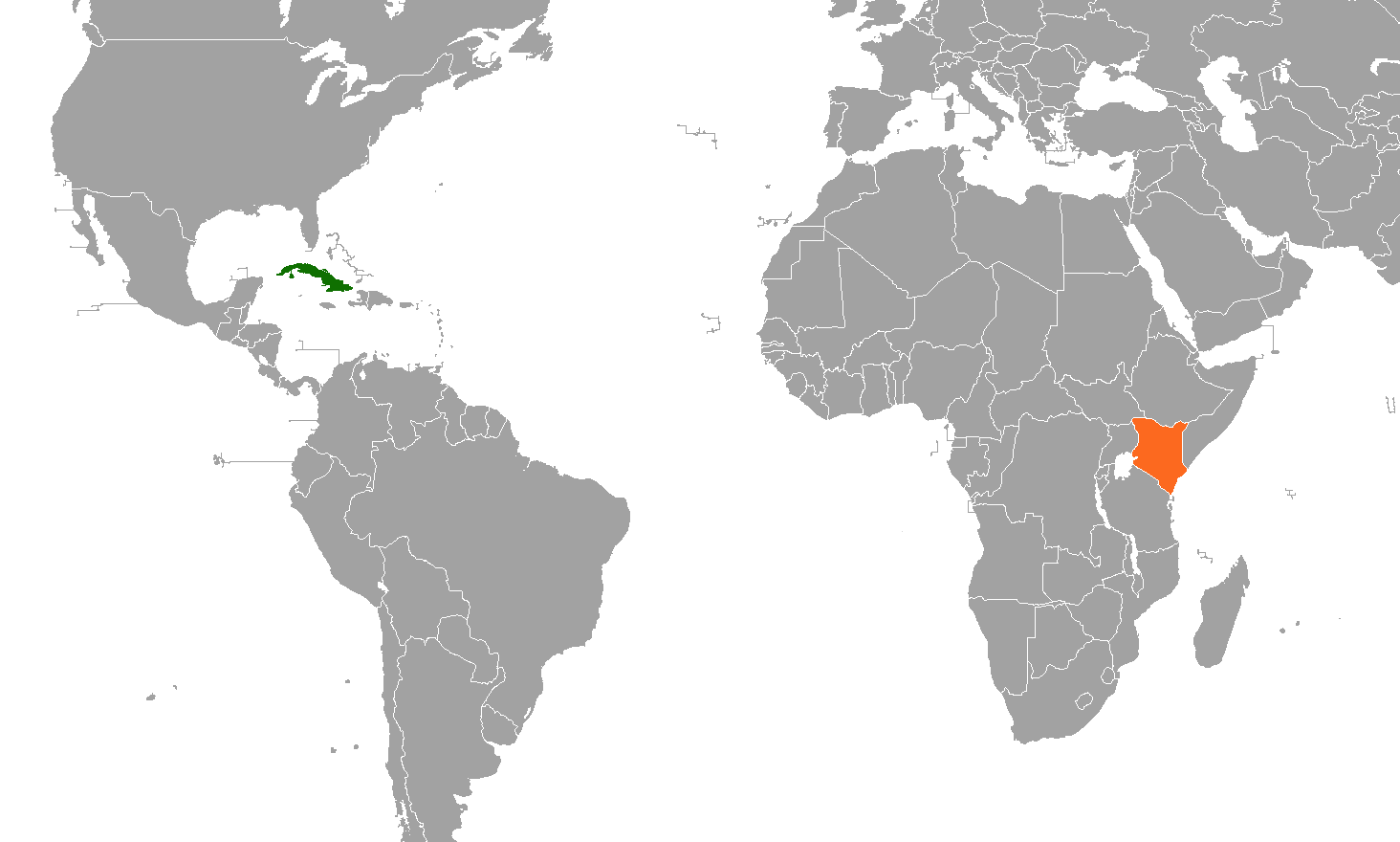

- Cuba: Kenya

Cuba–Kenya relations refers to the diplomatic relations between the Republic of Cuba and the Republic of Kenya. Cuba has an embassy in Nairobi, while Kenya has an embassy in Havana. Both nations are members of the Group of 77, Non-Aligned Movement and the United Nations.

== History ==
Both nations established diplomatic relations on 19 October 1995. In 2001, Cuba opened an embassy in Nairobi. Initially, relations between both nations were limited.

In September 2016, Kenyan Principal Secretary for Foreign Affairs, Monica Juma, paid a visit to Cuba and opened Kenya's first resident embassy in Havana. In November 2016, Kenyan President Uhuru Kenyatta attended the funeral of former Cuban President Fidel Castro in Havana.

In March 2018, President Kenyatta returned to Cuba on a state visit. While in Cuba, President Kenyatta met with President Raúl Castro where both leaders held bilateral discussions.

In 2021, both nations celebrated 20 years of diplomatic relations. In 2026, Kenya closed its embassy in Havana.

== Bilateral agreements ==
Both nations have signed a few bilateral agreements such as an Agreement to hold bilateral political consultations (2004); Agreement in Health Cooperation and allowing Cuban doctors to provide health care in Kenya (2017); and an Agreement for the training of Kenyan health professionals in Cuba (2022).

== Resident diplomatic missions ==
- Cuba has an embassy in Nairobi.
- Kenya is accredited to Cuba from its high commission in Kingston, Jamaica.
