= Cuba–Grenada relations =

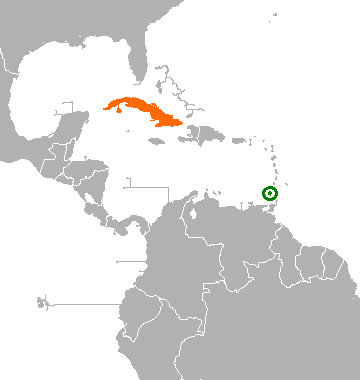

- Cuba: Grenada

Cuba–Grenada relations are bilateral relations with current relationship between the Republic of Cuba and Grenada. The relationship with the Republic of Cuba and the People's Revolutionary Government of Grenada were formally established diplomatic relations on 14 April 1979 until November 1983. After a 10 years break, preceded by the collapse of the People's Revolutionary Government of Grenada. The relationship with the Republic of Cuba and Grenada resumed diplomatic relations in 1994. In 2008, the Government of Grenada announced a move to build a monument to honour the Cubans killed during the 1983 invasion of Grenada.

In December 2014, Grenada joined Bolivarian Alliance for the Peoples of Our America (ALBA) as a full member. Prime minister Keith Mitchell said that the membership was a natural extension of the co-operation Grenada have had over the years with both Cuba and Venezuela. Grenada was accepted during the XIII Summit of the Alliance, which occurred in Havana, Cuba.

== Bilateral agreements ==
Date	Agreement name	Law ref. number	Note
1982-1984	Cuban-Grenadian military agreement		

== Diplomacy ==
Of Cuba

- Lance Aux Epines (Embassy)

Of Grenada

- Havana (Embassy)
