= Cuba–Libya relations =

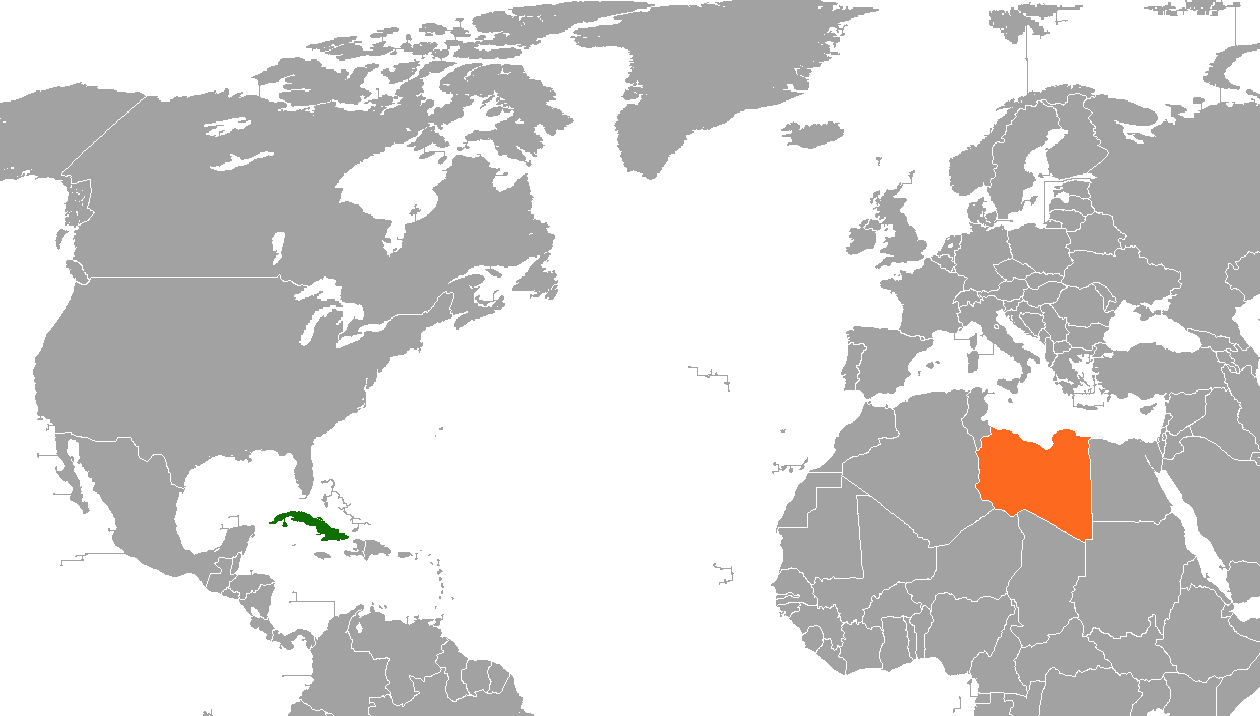

- Cuba: Libya

Cuba–Libya relations are the bilateral relations between Republic of Cuba and Libya. The two countries are members of the Group of 77, Non-Aligned Movement and the United Nations.

== History ==
Both countries established diplomatic relations on 1 March 1976.

During the First Libyan civil war, Cuban Former president Fidel Castro, who remained influential within the Communist Party of Cuba, expressed concern that the United States was preparing to invade Libya.

On 23 October 2011, after Gaddafi's death, Fidel Castro condemned the assassination of Muammar Gaddafi, and the "genocidal role" of NATO. He added also that "Gaddafi's body has been kidnapped and displayed as a trophy of war, a conduct that violates the most elementary principles of Islamic rules and other religious beliefs prevailing in the world."

== Resident diplomatic missions ==
- Libya has an embassy in Havana.
- Cuba is accredited to Libya from its embassy in Cairo.
