= Cuba–Indonesia relations =

- Cuba: Indonesia

Cuba and Indonesia established diplomatic relations in 1960. During the administration of Indonesia's first president Sukarno in the 1960s, Indonesia and Cuba enjoyed an exceptionally close relationship. The relations between the two nations mostly focused on sports and health. Cuba has an embassy in Jakarta, while Indonesia has an embassy in Havana that is also accredited to the Commonwealth of the Bahamas and Jamaica. Both nations are full members of the Non-Aligned Movement and partners in the Group of 77 and the Forum of East Asia-Latin America Cooperation.

== History ==
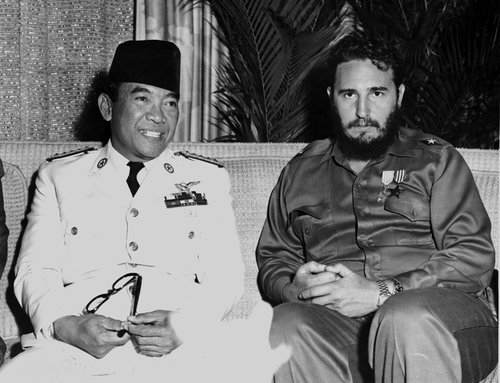
Fidel Castro and Indonesian President Sukarno in Havana, 1960

The diplomatic relations between two countries were officially established on 22 January 1960 during the historical visit of Indonesian first president Sukarno to the Cuban capital Havana. During this visit Sukarno paid a courtesy call to Cuban Prime Minister Fidel Castro and also Che Guevara, in this occasion Sukarno presented Castro a keris, Indonesian traditional dagger as a token of friendship. During this period, the relations between the leaders of both countries are warm and exceptionally close, mainly because they shared revolutionary leftist aspirations against imperialism, Sukarno did share close relationships with numbers of the world's socialist leaders.

Indonesian embassy in Havana was officially opened on 14 August 1963. However, due to austerity reasons, Indonesia closed its Havana embassy in October 1971 and accredited its foreign affairs with Cuba to its embassy in Mexico City. In December 1995, Indonesian embassy in Havana was reopened.

In 11–14 April 2000, Indonesian President Abdurrahman Wahid visited Havana to attend G-77 Summit of developing countries. Few hours before Wahid's departure from Havana to Tokyo, Fidel Castro paid a surprise unscheduled courtesy call to Wahid in Indonesian president's room at the Melia Hotel. Previously a meeting has been arranged to take place after Wahid's arrival, however it was canceled. During this informal meeting, Abdurrahman suggested Castro that one of the summit attendants promote the results of the international event to the Northern countries, and proposed Malaysian Prime Minister Mahathir Mohamad to do the job.

== Cooperation ==
Indonesia and Cuba mainly focused on sports and health sectors in their bilateral relations and cooperation. For example, Indonesia has sent their boxers, volleyball players and gymnasts to be trained in Cuba. On the other hand, there are numbers of Cuban athletes that made their career in Indonesian sports clubs, especially in volleyball. In December 2006 the health authority of both nations agreed on cooperation in developing new vaccines for dengue fever and malaria.

== Trade ==
Bilateral trade between Indonesia and Cuba reached US$12.79 million in 2008, and reached its peak in 2011 with US$15.68 million trade value. Bilateral trade until October 2012 has reached US$12.40 million, with Indonesian export US$11.15 million and import US$1.24 million made the trade heavily in favour to Indonesia with US$9.91 million surplus. Indonesia mainly sells textiles, shoes and footwear, ceramics, furniture and electronics to Cuba, while buys Cuban cigars and pharmaceuticals, especially vaccines.
