= Day of the Cuban Armed Forces =

National holiday in Cuba, December 2

Day of the Cuban Revolutionary Armed Forces Día de las Fuerzas Armadas Revolucionarias
- Observed by: Cuba
- Celebrations: Military parades, ceremonies
- Date: December 2
- Next time: 2 December 2026
- Frequency: annual

The Day of the Cuban Armed Forces is a national holiday in Cuba celebrated annually on December 2 commemorating the landing of the Granma which brought the Castro brothers and their supporters from Mexico to Cuba to start their revolution against the Batista Regime. The event is marked by military parades, fireworks and concerts throughout the country.

== History and celebrations ==
In October 1956, a group of Cuban dissidents, led by Fidel Castro, purchased a yacht called the Granma for US$15,000 from a United States-based Company, Schuylkill Products Inc. The yacht, which carried 82 rebels sailed from the Mexican port of Tuxpan, Veracruz on November 25, 1956 and headed for Cuba. The revolutionaries planned to land in the province of Oriente and begin an armed struggle against the government of Batista. On the night of December 2, the Granma landed on the coast of Cuba. The landing of a group of Cubans led by Fidel Castro from the yacht Granma is considered to be the day of the beginning of the Revolutionary Insurrectionary Army, from which the Revolutionary Armed Forces of Cuba was its successor.

In the years after the landing, date has been marked annually as the Day of the Cuban Armed Forces The largest parade to be held took place in 1986 in the presence of General Humberto Ortega from Nicaragua as well as officials from the Soviet Union. The first ever military parade in years to be held on the holiday was marked in 2006. The annual parade in 2016 celebrating the diamond jubilee was postponed for 1 month due to the Death and state funeral of Fidel Castro, and took place on January 2, 2017.

== Expanded summary ==
The Day of the Cuban Armed Forces is the foremost military holiday, which on special years has been marked by a full military parade by personnel of the Cuban Revolutionary Armed Forces in the Plaza de la Revolución, situated in the namesake district of the national capital city, Havana. The parade has been held with breaks since 1963, and is presided by the President of Cuba in his capacity as commander in chief of the Revolutionary Armed Forces and (at times) First Secretary of the Communist Party of Cuba (from 2006 to 2008 and from 2017 onwards, the posts have been held by separate people). With the veterans of the Revolution, the Bay of Pigs invasion and the Cuban Missile Crisis, and the international deployments of the Armed Forces during the Cold War, active personnel of the armed forces and their families, the diplomatic corps, citizens of Havana and pro-Cuba solidarity groups in the stands, as guest of honor, he arrives at 7:55 am for the parade proper at the José Martí Memorial's general saluting base, where he is received by the members of the Council of Ministers and the Council of State, the leadership and deputies from the National Assembly of People's Power, and Party officials. As the President arrives, the National Anthem (La Bayamesa) is played by the massed military bands provided by the Cuban Revolutionary Armed Forces Military Bands Department and a 21-gun salute is fired by the artillery battery of the Ceremonial Unit of the Cuban Revolutionary Armed Forces.

This is followed by the review of the parade formations, which are led by either an Army Corps General or a Divisional General, by the Minister of the Revolutionary Armed Forces, a billet of a general officer holding the rank of Army Corps General. As the report is made by the parade commander, the Minister responds by informing the President of the commencement of the ceremony. As the vehicles of both the parade commander and the parade reviewing officer pass the tribune, the parade formations, which are massed west of the square along the Avenida Paseo fronting the National Theater, present arms as the Minister of the Revolutionary Armed Forces' vehicle approaches the ground and mobile columns. The ground column formations of an estimated 8,900 personnel are from units of the Revolutionary Armed Forces and the Ministry of the Interior, while units from both organizations are at the rear providing the crews for the mobile column of around 550 vehicles and 1,800 crewmen, and behind them are the civilian formations forming up the demonstration segment following the parade proper. As the Minister's vehicle and that of the parade commander both halt in front of the formations, he greets the formations assembled:

Comrade participants of the civil-military parade dedicated to the anniversary of the landing of the Granma and the Day of the Revolutionary Armed Forces, Our greetings!

The parade responses with a loud Venceremos and the band then strikes up to the Yorckscher Marsch as the vehicles carrying the parade commander and the reviewing officer both return to the square. The keynote holiday address then follows. In recent parades, the University Youth Federation president addressed the nation from the saluting base.

=== Historical segment ===
Following this, the parade begins with the historical segment. As the trumpeters of the Armed Forces Massed Bands sound a bugle call, the mounted ceremonial horse guards battalion of the Revolutionary Army, wearing uniforms of the Cuban Mambisa cavalry (Caballeria Mabisa) of the Cuban War of Independence, trot past the saluting dais as the combined bands plays march music. As the mounted squadron passes by the saluting base the officers salute and the troopers present their machetes at the charge position, honoring the cavalrymen who fought during the conflict.

Following them is a contingent of Jose Marti Pioneer Organization Pioneers in the 5th and 6th grades escorting a replica of the Granma, the fast yacht whose landing in 1956 sparked the outbreak of the Revolution and the birth of the modern day Revolutionary Armed Forces. In the parade of 2017, the yacht contingent was followed by youth reenactors in three columns wearing uniforms of the guerilla combatants of the revolutionary period, carrying weapons used during those years. This is followed by the Bay of Pigs invasion segment, which begins with middle and high school level Pioneers escorting a T-34 medium tank and a SU-100 self-propelled gun, followed by a 2nd youth contingent wearing uniforms and weaponry used, followed by the living veterans of the Cuban forces deployed during that period. Then comes two civil contingents, one honoring the 1961 Cuban Literacy Campaign final march to Havana's city center by thousands of participating youths and teachers, and a children's theater trope.

=== March past proper ===
The finale of the historical segment is followed by the parade commander ordering the parade to march past in the following manner:

Parade... attention! Ceremonial pass in review!
By battalions! Distance by a single lineman! Right... turn! Slope... arms!
Eyes to the right, by the left, forward, quick march!

The massed military bands play a cadence at this point while the Ceremonial Unit's linemen take up their places in the Avenida Paseo. As the Marcha Invasor is played by the bands, the parade commander's vehicle, together with the general staff's vehicles and the color guard carrying the Flag of Cuba, all drive past the grandstand with all the officers saluting at the eyes right. The parading components march past in the following order:

- Havana Campus Battalion, Corps of Cadets, Camilio Cienfuegos Military Schools System
- Corps of Cadets, Jose Maceo Military College
- Corps of Cadets, Antonio Maceo Military College
- Corps of Cadets, Jose Marti Military Technical Institute
- Regiment of Midshipmen, Granma Naval Academy
- Corps of Cadets, Arides Sánchez Military Justice School
- Cuban Army
  - Western Army Battalion
  - Central Army Battalion
  - Eastern Army Battalion
  - Special Forces
  - Armed Forces Military Police
- Cuban Navy
- Cuban Air Force
- Youth Labor Army
- Ministry of the Interior
  - National Special Forces Brigade
  - Border Troops and Coast Guard
- Territorial Troops Militias

== See also ==
- Cuban Revolutionary Armed Forces
- Public holidays in Cuba
- Armed Forces Day
