= Sicre =

Sicre is a surname. Notable people with the surname include:

- Félix Sicre (1817–1871), Cuban chess master
- Jorge L. Sicre-Gattorno (born 1958), Cuban-American painter
- José Gómez-Sicre (1916–1991), Cuban lawyer, art critic and author
- Juan José Sicre (1898–1974), Cuban sculptor
