= Cuban Revolutionary Army =

Ground warfare branch of Cuba's military

Revolutionary Army
- Ejército Revolucionario
- Founded: 1868; 158 years ago 1960; 66 years ago (current form)
- Country: Cuba
- Role: Land warfare
- Size: 39,000 active soldiers
- Part of: Revolutionary Armed Forces
- Garrison/HQ: Havana, Cuba
- Engagements: Escambray rebellion Bay of Pigs Invasion; Sand War; Guinea-Bissau War of Independence; War of Attrition; Yemenite War of 1972; Yom Kippur War; Angolan Civil War; Ogaden War; United States invasion of Grenada

The Cuban Revolutionary Army (Spanish: Ejército Revolucionario) serve as the ground forces of Cuba. Formed in 1868 during the Ten Years' War, it was originally known as the Cuban Constitutional Army. Following the Cuban Revolution, the revolutionary military forces was reconstituted as the national army of Cuba by Fidel Castro in 1960. The army is a part of the Cuban Revolutionary Armed Forces which was founded around that time.

== History ==
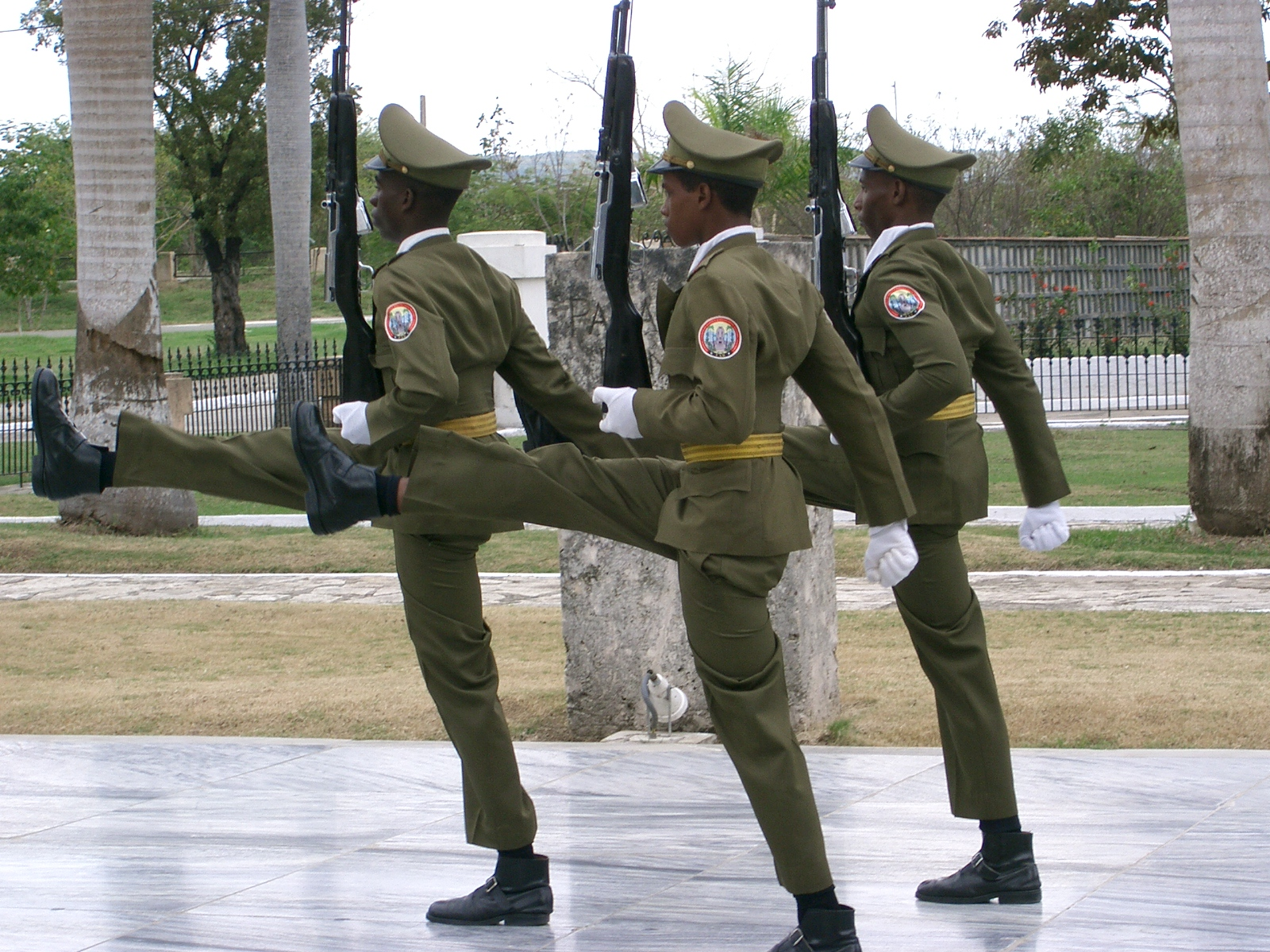
Guards at the Mausoleum of José Marti, Santiago de Cuba

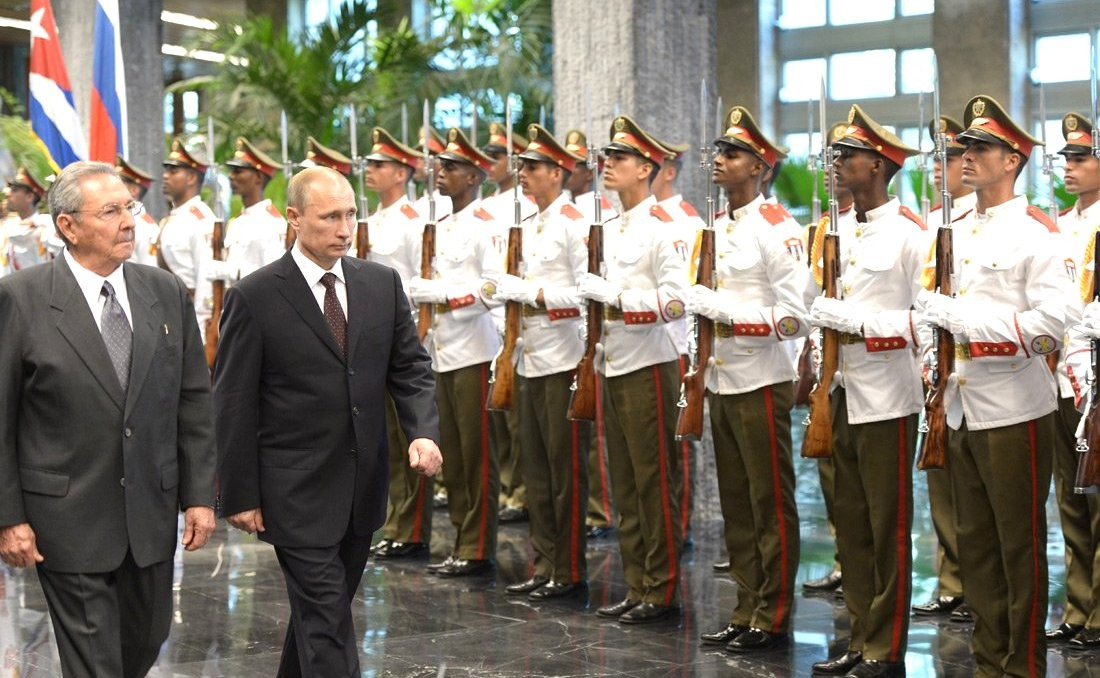
Vladimir Putin inspecting the Army Guard of Honour at the Palace of the Revolution in Havana in 2014.

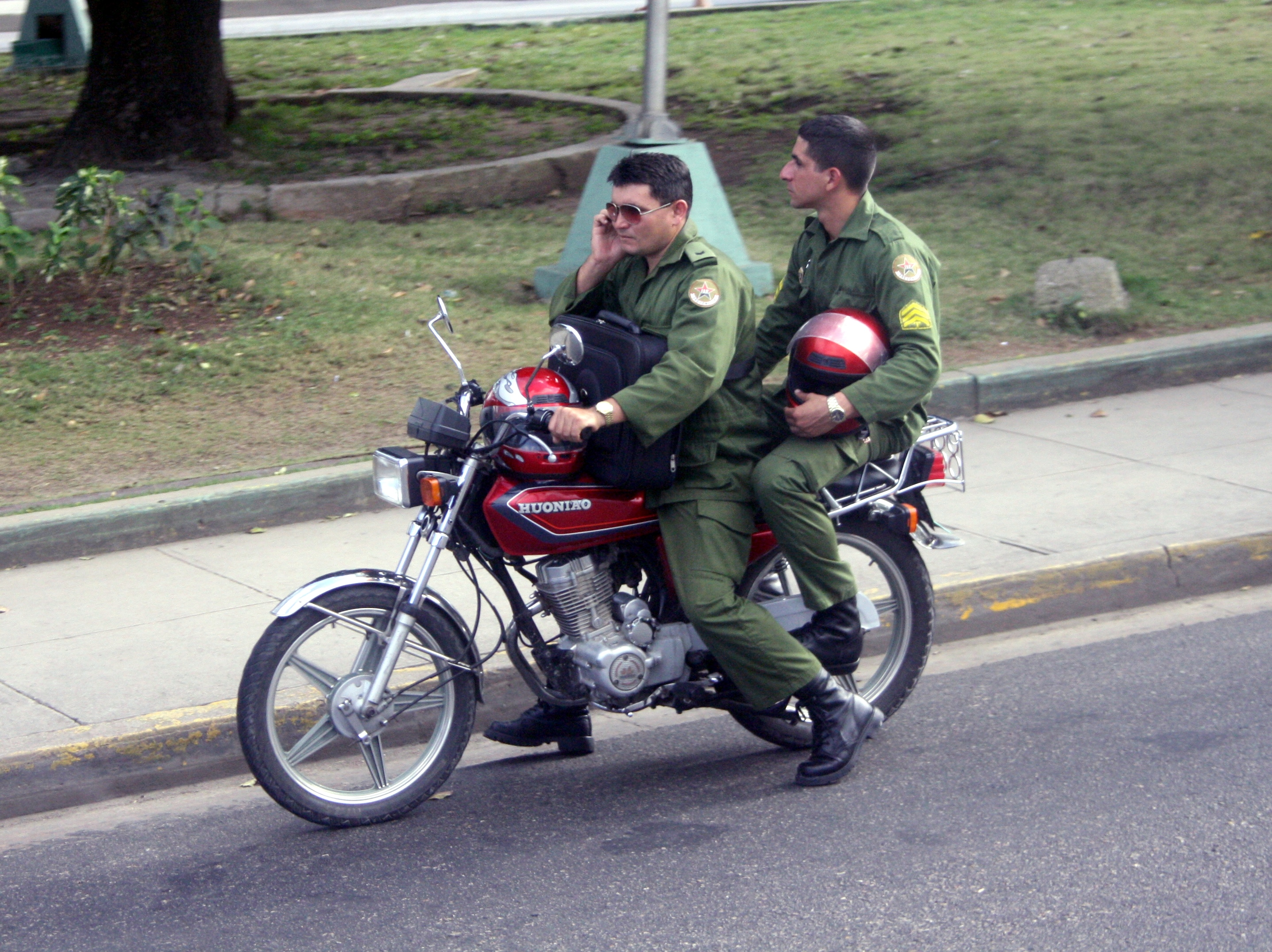
Soldiers of Fuerzas Armadas Revolucionarias on a motorbike

The Cuban Constitutional Army in its original form was first established in 1868 by Cuban revolutionaries during the Ten Years' War and later re-established during the Cuban War of Independence in 1898. The Cuban Constitutional Navy was involved in the Battle of the Caribbean during World War II supported by the United States. After the Cuban Revolution had overthrown Fulgencio Batista's government, the Cuban Rebel Army under Fidel Castro's leadership was reorganized into the current armed forces of Cuba.

As of July 1981, the army comprised 200,000 personnel, inc 60,000 reservists; there were an estimated three armoured brigades; 15 infantry divisions (brigades), some mechanised; and some independent battalions. The IISS estimated that it had 200 T-54/55 and 50 T-60 tanks, plus 400 T-34s, and IS-2 heavy tanks, and a variety of other Soviet equipment, including BRDM-1; 400 BTR-40/60; artillery up to 152mm; and 50 FROG-4 (2K6 Luna?) surface to surface missiles.

In 1984, according to Adrian English, there were three major geographical commands, Western, Central, and Eastern. There were a reported 130,000 all ranks, and each command was garrisoned by an army comprising a single armoured division, a mechanised division, and a corps of three infantry divisions, though the Eastern Command had two corps totalling six divisions. There was also an independent military region, with a single infantry division, which garrisoned the Isle of Youth.

An idea of this structure can be seen from a Jane's depiction (in error) dated 1996:

Units included:

- Airborne brigade consisting of 2 battalions (at Havana and its immediate environs)
- Artillery division (at Havana and its immediate environs)
- SAM Brigade
- An anti-aircraft artillery regiment

=== Western Army ===
In the late 1980s and early 1990s the Western Army was deployed in the capital and the provinces of Havana and Pinar del Río:

- 1st Armored Division (Training) "Sanguily Rescue"
- 70th Mechanized Infantry Division
- 78th Armored Division
- 2nd (Pinar del Río) Army Corps:
  - 24th Infantry Division
  - 27th Infantry Division
  - 28th Infantry Division

=== Central Army ===
In the 1980s–1990s the Central Army was deployed in the provinces of Matanzas, Villa Clara, Cienfuegos and Sancti Spiritus:

- 81st Infantry Division
- 84th Infantry Division
- 86th Infantry Division
- 89th Infantry Division
- 12th Armored Regiment/1st Armored Division
- 242nd Infantry Regiment/24th Infantry Division
- 4th (Las Villas) Army Corps:
  - 41st Infantry Division
  - 43rd Infantry Division
  - 48th Infantry Division

=== Eastern Army ===
In the 1980s–1990s the Eastern Army was deployed in the provinces of Santiago de Cuba, Guantánamo, Granma, Holguín, Las Tunas, Camagüey and Ciego de Avila:

- 3rd Armored Division
- 6th Armored Division
- 9th Armored Division
- 31st Infantry Division
- 32nd Infantry Division
- 38th Infantry Division
- 84th Infantry Division
- 90th Infantry Division
- 95th Infantry Division
- 97th Infantry Division
- Guantanamo Frontier Brigade (founded in 1961)
- 123rd Infantry Division/former 12th Infantry Division
- 281st Infantry Regiment/28th Infantry Division
- 5th (Holguín) Army Corps:
  - 50th Mechanised Division
  - 52nd Infantry Division
  - 54th Infantry Division
  - 56th Infantry Division
  - 58th Infantry Division
- 6th (Camagüey) Army Corps:
  - 60th Mechanised Division
  - 63rd Infantry Division
  - 65th Infantry Division
  - 69th Infantry Division

The International Institute for Strategic Studies wrote in The Military Balance 1994–95 that "the Cuban Army is undergoing major reorganisation; ..strength has been reduced by 60,000 to some 85,000 and is now structured on a brigade as opposed to a divisional basis." (p. 194).

A U.S. Defense Intelligence Agency assessment in the first half of 1998 said that the army's armour and artillery units were at low readiness levels due to 'severely reduced' training, generally incapable of mounting effective operations above the battalion level, and that equipment was mostly in storage and unavailable at short notice. The same report said that Cuban special operations forces continue to train but on a smaller scale than beforehand, and that while the lack of replacement parts for its existing equipment and the current severe shortage of fuel were increasingly affecting operational capabilities, Cuba remained able to offer considerable resistance to any regional power.

=== Structure in 1999 ===
In 1999 the Revolutionary Army represented approximately 70 percent of Cuba's regular military manpower. According to the IISS, the army's estimated 45,000 troops including 6,000 active and 39,000 members of the Ready Reserves who were completing the forty-five days of annual active-duty service necessary for maintaining their status, as well as conscripts who were fulfilling their military service requirement.

The IISS reported in 1999 that the army's troop formations consisted of four to five armored brigades; nine mechanized infantry brigades; an airborne brigade; fourteen reserve brigades; and the Border Brigade. In addition, there is an air defense artillery regiment and a surface-to-air missile brigade. Each of the three territorial armies is believed to be assigned at least one armored brigade-usually attached to the army's headquarters-as well as a mechanized infantry brigade. It is known that the Border Brigade in Guantanamo and at least one ground artillery regiment (attached to a mechanized infantry brigade), based in Las Tunas, are under the Eastern Army's command.

Circa 2007, there were an estimated 38,000 army personnel.

== Uniforms ==
The most common uniform worn by Cuban soldiers appear to be solid color olive green utility uniforms. The utility uniform is worn with shined black combat boots, and the most common hats that are worn with this uniform are stiffened patrol caps that were made famous outside of Cuba by being worn by Fidel Castro.

Soldiers in tank, military police, and special forces units are also allowed to wear berets with this uniform. The Cuban utility uniform greatly resembles the OG-107 uniform that was standard issue in the United States Armed Forces during the Cold War.
