= Gattorno =

Gattorno is a surname. Notable people with the surname include:

- Antonio Gattorno (1904-1980), Cuban painter
- Francisco Gattorno (born 1964), Cuban-Mexican actor
- Jorge L. Sicre-Gattorno (born 1958), Cuban-American painter
- Rosa Maria Benedetta Gattorno Custo (1831–1900), Italian Roman Catholic nun
