= Cuba–Turkey relations =

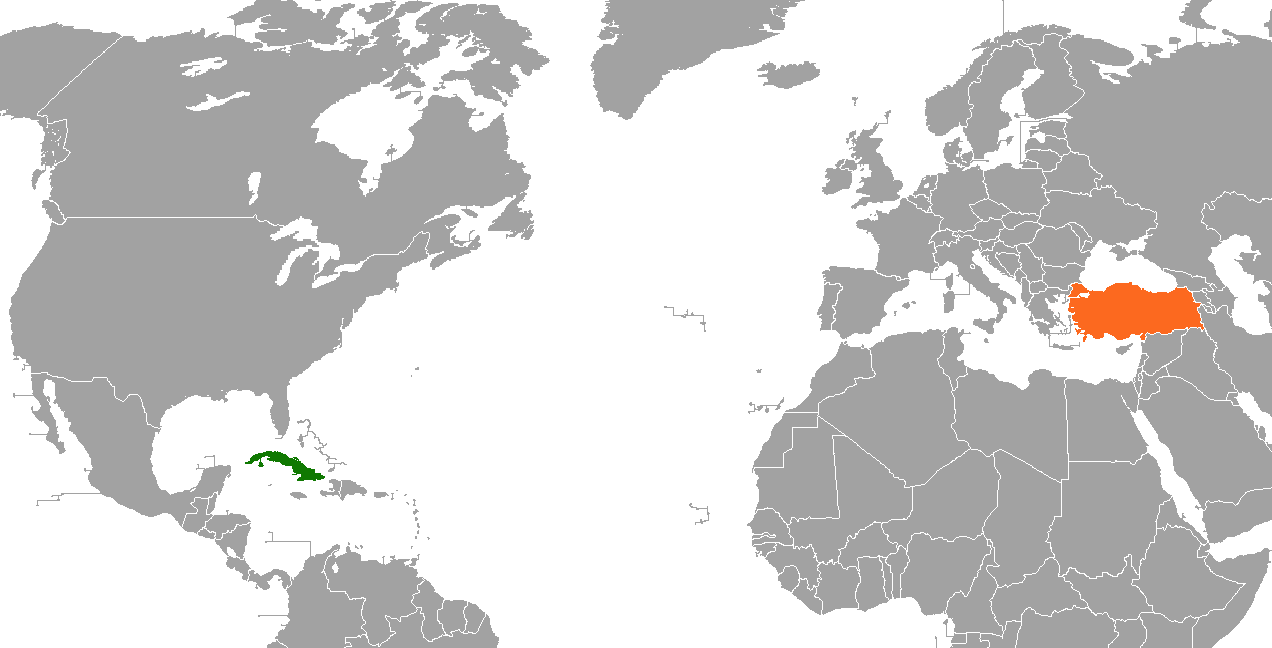

- Cuba: Turkey

Cuba–Turkey relations are foreign relations between Cuba and Turkey.

Diplomatic relations between Turkey and Cuba were established in 1952. Turkey opened its first embassy in the Caribbean in Havana in 1979.

Recep Tayyip Erdoğan, President of the Republic of Turkey paid a visit to Cuba on 10-11 February 2015. This was the first presidential visit from Turkey to Cuba and was a milestone for the bilateral relations between the two countries. In November 2022, President Miguel Díaz-Canel Bermúdez of Cuba paid an official visit to Turkey.

== Official Visits ==
Guest	Host	Place of visit	Date of visit
(Turkey) President Recep Tayyip Erdoğan	(Cuba) President Raúl Castro	Palacio de la Revolución, Havana	February 10–11, 2015
(Cuba) Minister of Foreign Affairs Bruno Rodríguez Parrilla	(Turkey) Minister of Foreign Affairs Mevlüt Çavuşoğlu	Çankaya Köşkü, Ankara	June 15–16, 2017
(Turkey) Minister of Foreign Affairs Mevlüt Çavuşoğlu	(Cuba) President Miguel Díaz-Canel	Palacio de la Revolución, Havana	May 17–18, 2019

== Economic relations ==
Trade volume between the two countries was 54.7 million USD in 2019 (Turkish exports/imports: 42.9/11.8 million USD).

== Resident diplomatic missions ==
- Cuba has an embassy in Ankara and a consulate-general in Istanbul.
- Turkey has an embassy in Havana.
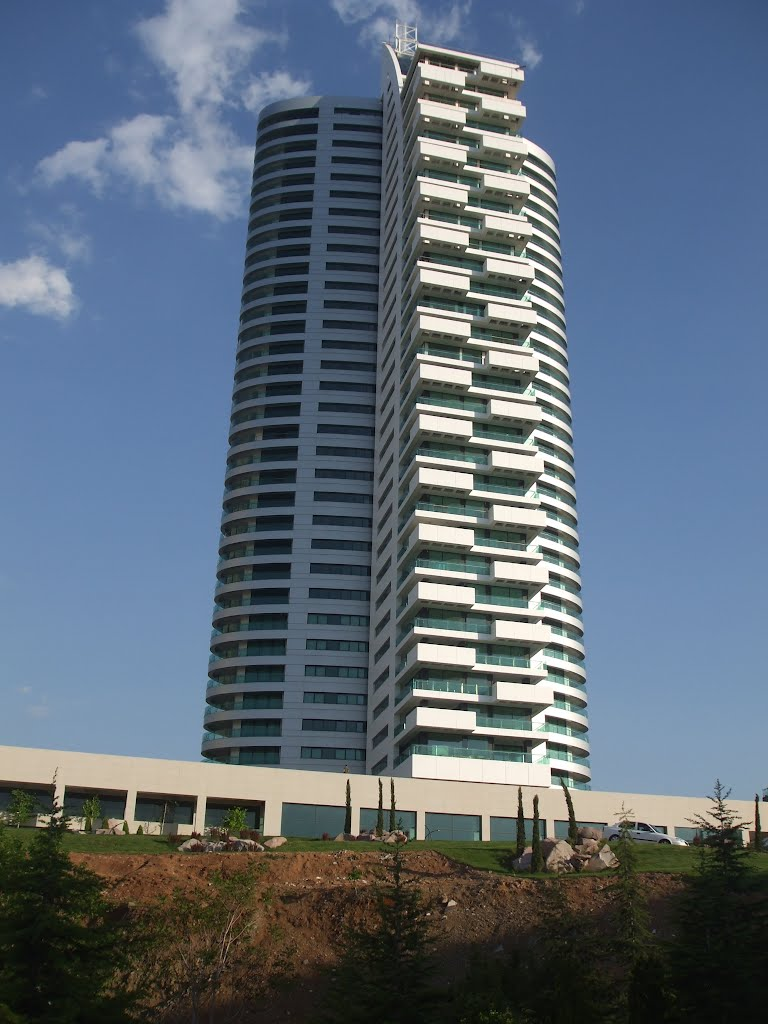
Çiçeği Residence hosting the Embassy of Cuba in Ankara

== See also ==
- Foreign relations of Cuba
- Foreign relations of Turkey
- List of ambassadors of Turkey to Cuba
- Cuban Missile Crisis
