= Cuban Revolutionary Armed Forces Military Bands Department =

Cuban Revolutionary Armed Forces Bands Department
- Banda de las Fuerzas Armadas Revolucionarias de Cuba
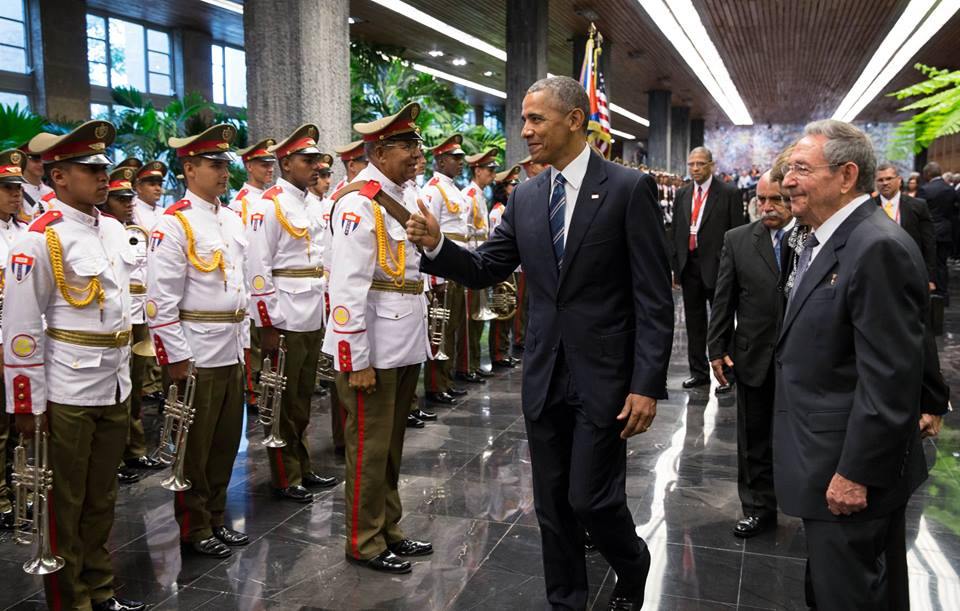
- Barack Obama and Raúl Castro meeting with members of the band.
- Active: 1 April 1960; 66 years ago
- Country: Cuba
- Branch: Cuban Revolutionary Army
- Type: Infantry band
- Role: Musical Accompaniment
- Size: 340
- Headquarters: Havana
- March: Evocación (flagship march)

Commanders
- Current Bandleader: Lieutenant Dayany Albuerne Aguilar
- Notable commanders: Lieutenant Colonel Ney Miguel Milanés Gálvez (nicknamed "El Maestro")

The Cuban Revolutionary Armed Forces Military Bands Department is a military band service based in Havana, serving the men and women of the Cuban Revolutionary Armed Forces. It was notably led by Lieutenant Colonel Ney Miguel Milanés Gálvez (born in 1944), who had been leading the for 46 years from 1974 to 2019. The band service is a cultural tool for the Revolutionary Armed Forces aimed at maintaining the patriotism and high morale of the servicemen and women and veterans. It is based on a mix of Russian, German, and Caribbean military musical tradition.

== Brief history and contemporary role ==
External videos
- Cantata "Eterno Fidel"

It was founded on 1 April 1960, by order of Juan Almeida Bosque, at the request of Ernesto "Che" Guevara, who was then the President of the National Bank of Cuba. It was a descendant of the Havana Infantry Regiment Band (Banda de Música del Regimiento de Infantería de La Habana). It plays an important role in providing accompaniment for military parades that take place on Revolution Square on January 2. This group is also present at ceremonial activities on the island. In May 2007, the band took part in the welcoming of the Capitán Miranda of the National Navy of Uruguay at Havana Harbor. During the state visit of President Barack Obama to Havana, Obama greeted Ney Miguel Milanes Gálvez and praised the band for their performance of The Star-Spangled Banner saying that they did a "Good job". During the death and state funeral of Fidel Castro in November 2016, a march was composed specifically for the occasion by the band. The march, known as Eternal Fidel (Eterno Fidel), was composed by Lieutenant Colonel Milanés.

== Composition ==
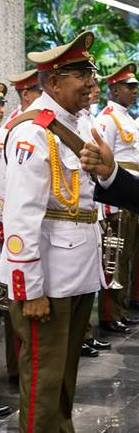
Bandleader Ney Miguel Milanés Gálvez

The Military Bands Department is made up of the following bands:

- Band of the General Staff of the Armed Forces (Banda de Música del Estado Mayor General de las Fuerzas Armadas Revolucionarias)
- Band of the Ceremonial Unit of the Revolutionary Armed Forces (Banda de Música del Unidad Ceremonial de las Fuerzas Armadas Revolucionarias)
- Central Band of the Ministry of the Interior (Banda de Música del Ministerio del Interior), affiliated to the Ministry of the Interior
- Band of the Eastern Army
- Band of the Western Army
- Band of the Central Army
- Band of the Jose Maceo Military College
- Band of the Antonio Maceo Military College
- Band of the Jose Marti Military Technical Institute
- Band of the Granma Naval Academy

If massed on parade, the massed bands of the department are made up of 370 bandsmen from several of the bands.
