= Cuban Revolutionary Armed Forces Ceremonial Unit =

Ceremonial Unit of the Cuban Revolutionary Armed Forces
- Unidad Ceremonial de las Fuerzas Armadas Revolucionarias
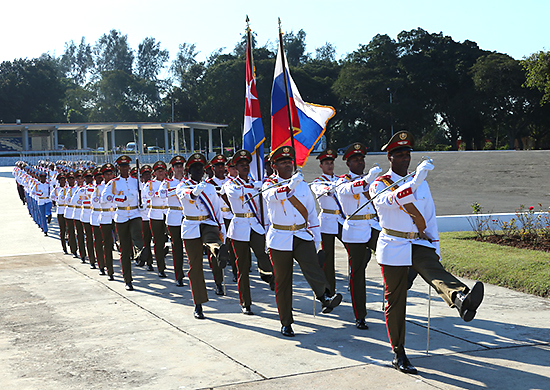
- The Ceremonial Unit during the visit of Sergei Shoigu in 2015
- Founded: 15 December 1961; 64 years ago
- Country: Cuba
- Allegiance: (Cuba) Cuban Revolutionary Armed Forces
- Type: Infantry, Guard of Honour
- Role: Ceremonial honours, Public Duties
- Size: Battalion
- Part of: General Staff
- Headquarters: Havana
- Nickname: FAR General Staff Ceremonies Unit

Commanders
- Commander in Chief of the FAR: Miguel Díaz-Canel
- Commander: Lieutenant Colonel Ramón Gilart Hernández
- Notable commanders: Lieutenant Colonel José Luis Peraza López

Insignia
- Shoulder Patch

The Ceremonial Unit of the Cuban Revolutionary Armed Forces (Spanish: Unidad Ceremonial de las Fuerzas Armadas Revolucionarias) is a ceremonial rituals battalion of the Cuban Revolutionary Armed Forces (FAR). Since its foundation on December 15, 1961, the male and female members of the unit has provided honours for the Communist Party of Cuba, the Government of Cuba, and the FAR. The unit uses intense physical and political techniques, including martial, maintain the discipline that is required for the soldiers and officers of the ceremonial unit.

== Ceremonial functions and history ==
The unit's main function is the perform the changing of the guard every half-hour at the José Marti Mausoleum inside Santa Ifigenia Cemetery. In addition to providing honors related to protocol (funeral honors, presentation of credentials, the delivery of national medals, welcoming of foreign naval fleets, wreath laying ceremonies, street lining for military parades on the Plaza de la Revolución). The unit represents the revolutionary armed forces during arrival ceremonies at the Palace of the Revolution for state visits to Havana, with musical accompaniment provided by the Band of the Ceremonial Unit. In recent years, the unit has taken part in the welcoming of Barack Obama, the Prince of Wales and Felipe IV of Spain. During the honors for Soviet leader Leonid Brezhnev in 1974, the unit's color guard carried the branch colors of the Soviet Army, Navy, and Air Force. Outside of the country, the unit has most notably taken part in the 2015 China Victory Day Parade. During the rehearsals for the parade, the 82 member formation was often noted for being the last ones on the drill field and the few to use chinese martial arts such as Tai chi in their exercises. The unit also played a large role in the death and state funeral of Fidel Castro in November 2016. In 1991, the Ceremonial Unit debuted an historical dress uniform worn during the opening ceremony of the 1991 Pan American Games held in Havana, inspired by the rayadillo-styled uniforms worn by the Cuban revolutionary soldiers of the War of Independence and the Spanish-American War.

Holidays that are covered by the unit include:

- Triumph of the Revolution (1 January)
- Victory Day (2 January)
- Day of the Cuban Armed Forces (2 December)
- Day of the National Rebellion (26 July)
- Independence Day (10 October)

The unit also includes in its ranks a ceremonial artillery battery which fires 21-gun salutes in state events.

== Gallery ==
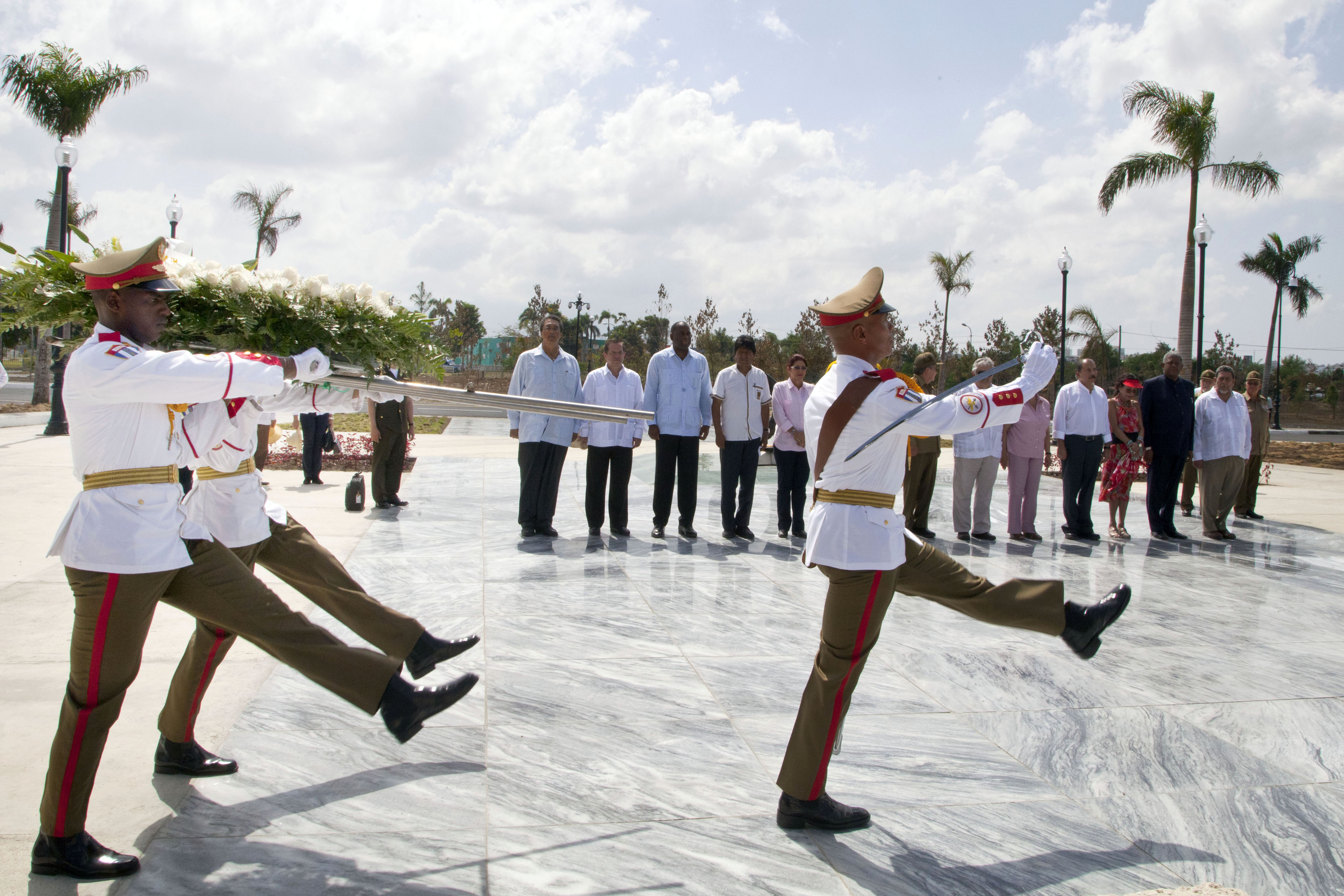
A wreath laying team led by unit commander José Luis Peraza López at the José Martí Memorial.

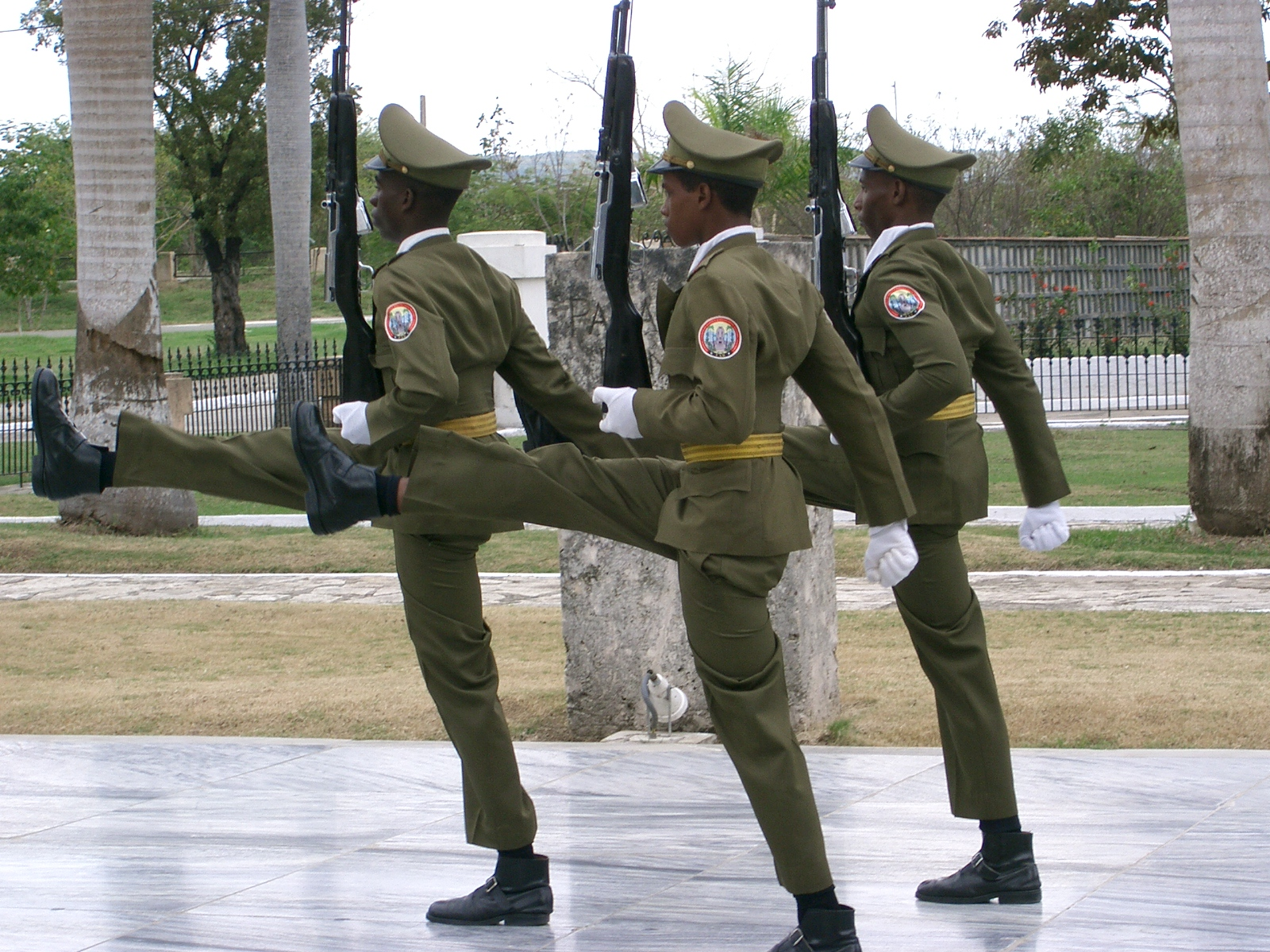
Three guardsmen departing from the changing of the guard.

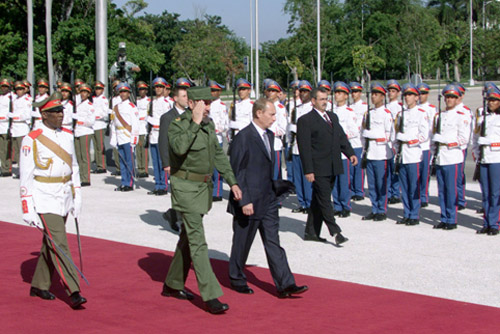
Vladimir Putin accompanied by Castro and the unit commander, inspecting members of the honour guard outside the office of the Council of State, December 2000.

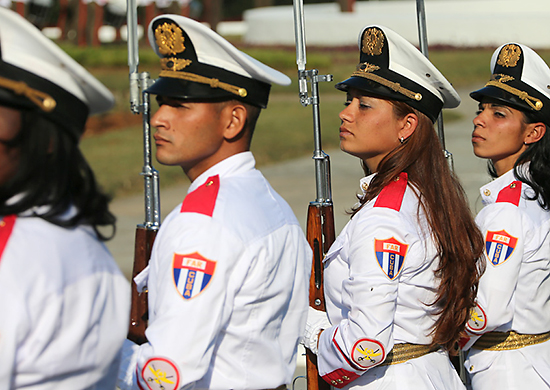
Members of the units at a memorial to Soviet troops.

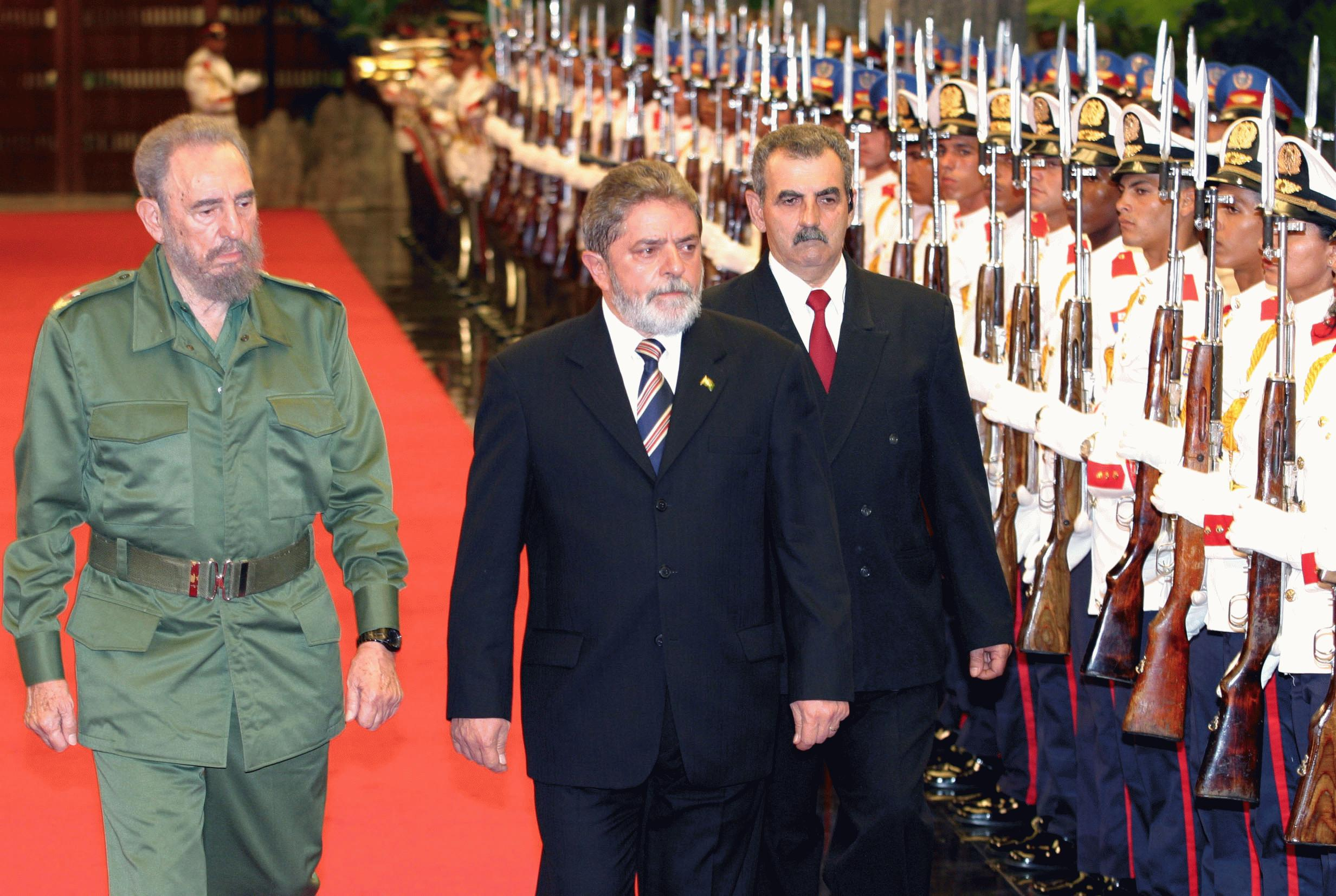
Luiz Inácio Lula da Silva and Fidel Castro inspecting the unit.
