= List of ambassadors of Turkey to Norway =

The list of ambassadors of Turkey to Norway provides a chronological record of individuals who have served as the diplomatic representatives of the Republic of Turkey to the Kingdom of Norway.

== List of ambassadors ==
Ambassador	Term start	Term end	Ref.
Ali Haydar Aktay	1 January 1926	1 January 1928	(Note: The authentic days and months are unknown for the first two ambassadors.)
Ragıp Raif Köseraif	1 January 1929	1 January 1938	
Süreyya Anderiman	8 February 1946	27 May 1957	
Fuat Bayramoğlu	29 June 1957	7 May 1959	
Behçet Türkmen	30 May 1959	29 July 1960	
Beşir Balcıoğlu	30 October 1960	3 August 1964	
Osman Derinsu	18 August 1964	11 August 1968	
Cihat Rüştü Veyselli	31 August 1968	8 December 1971	
Cahit Hayta	15 January 1972	22 November 1976	
Erdem Erner	27 November 1976	24 June 1980	
Haluk Özgül	28 June 1980	28 April 1984	
Şefik Fenmen	28 April 1984	1 September 1986	
Üstün Dinçmen	1 September 1986	26 August 1988	
Erol Celasun	31 August 1988	2 December 1990	
Ömür Orhun	6 December 1990	21 April 1995	
Burhan Ant	30 June 1995	31 March 1998	
Osman Korutürk	1 April 1998	1 October 2000	
Berhan Ekinci	31 October 2000	1 December 2004	
Mehmet Kazım Görkay	26 November 2004	1 April 2008	
Hayati Güven	1 April 2008	21 December 2011	
Şanıvar Olgun	16 January 2012	1 March 2014	
Esat Şafak Göktürk	1 March 2014	15 December 2018	
Fazlı Çorman	15 December 2018	15 January 2023	
Gülin Dinç	1 February 2023	Present	

== See also ==
- Norway–Turkey relations
