= List of ambassadors of Turkey to Cuba =

The list of ambassadors of Turkey to Cuba provides a chronological record of individuals who have served as the diplomatic representatives of the Republic of Turkey to the Republic of Cuba. The diplomatic relations between Turkey and Cuba dates back to 1952.

== List of ambassadors ==
Ambassador	Term start	Term end	Ref.
Nazmi Akıman	4 February 1980	16 July 1981	
Gündoğdu Can	12 August 1981	17 November 1985	
Kemal Girgin	28 January 1986	17 July 1989	
Mehmet Güney	8 August 1989	14 March 1993	
Aykut Berk	6 April 1993	18 April 1998	
Ataman Yalgın	1 May 1998	30 May 2002	
Vefahan Ocak	5 June 2002	8 January 2007	
Şanıvar Olgun	14 February 2007	2 October 2009	
İnci Tümay	13 October 2009	13 January 2012	
Hasan Servet Öktem	15 June 2012	15 November 2016	
Ayşe Berris Ekinci	30 November 2016	1 April 2021	
Vehbi Esgel Etensel	3 April 2021	Present	

== See also ==
- Cuba–Turkey relations
- Cuban missile crisis
