= Şanıvar Olgun =

Turkish diplomat

Kadriye Şanıvar Olgun

Turkey Ambassador to Panama
- In office 4 March 2014 – 15 November 2016
- President: Abdullah Gül; Recep Tayyip Erdoğan
- Preceded by: new established
- Succeeded by: Deniz Özmen

Turkey Ambassador to Norway
- In office 16 January 2012 – 1 March 2014
- President: Abdullah Gül
- Preceded by: Uğur Ergun
- Succeeded by: Hayati Güven

Turkey Ambassador to Cuba
- In office 14 February 2007 – 2 October 2009
- President: Ahmet Necdet Sezer; Abdullah Gül
- Preceded by: Vefahan Ocak
- Succeeded by: İnci Tümay

Turkey Ambassador to Lithuania
- In office 1 February 2004 – 31 December 2006
- President: Ahmet Necdet Sezer
- Preceded by: Nazım Belger
- Succeeded by: Oğuz Özge

Personal details
- Born: March 17, 1954 (age 72) Yozgat, Turkey
- Education: Faculty of Political Science, Ankara University (Political science)
- Profession: Diplomat

Kadriye Şanıvar Olgun (born 1954), Turkish diplomat and ambassador.

== Private life ==
Kadriye Şanıvar Olgun was born in Yozgat, Turkey in 1954. After completing her high school education at TED Ankara College Foundation Schools, she graduated from the Faculty of Political Science, Ankara University. She was married to diplomat and ambassador Balkan Kızıldeli.

== Career ==
In 1977, she entered the service of the Ministry of Foreign Affairs. Before she was appointed Ambassador of Turkey to Lithuania, she was the Deputy Director General of the Department for NATO Affairs in the Ministry.

She served as Ambassador of Turkey to Lithuania between 1 February 2004 and 31 December 2006, to Cuba from 14 February 2007 to 2 October 2009, to Norway between 16 December 2012 and 1 March 2014, and to Panama from 4 March 2014 to 15 November 2016.

Olgun served as the Director General of the Department for Balkans and Central Europe Affairs in 2010, and as the Chief of Protocol one year long in 2010-2011 before she took office in Oslo as ambassador.
