= Norway–Turkey relations =

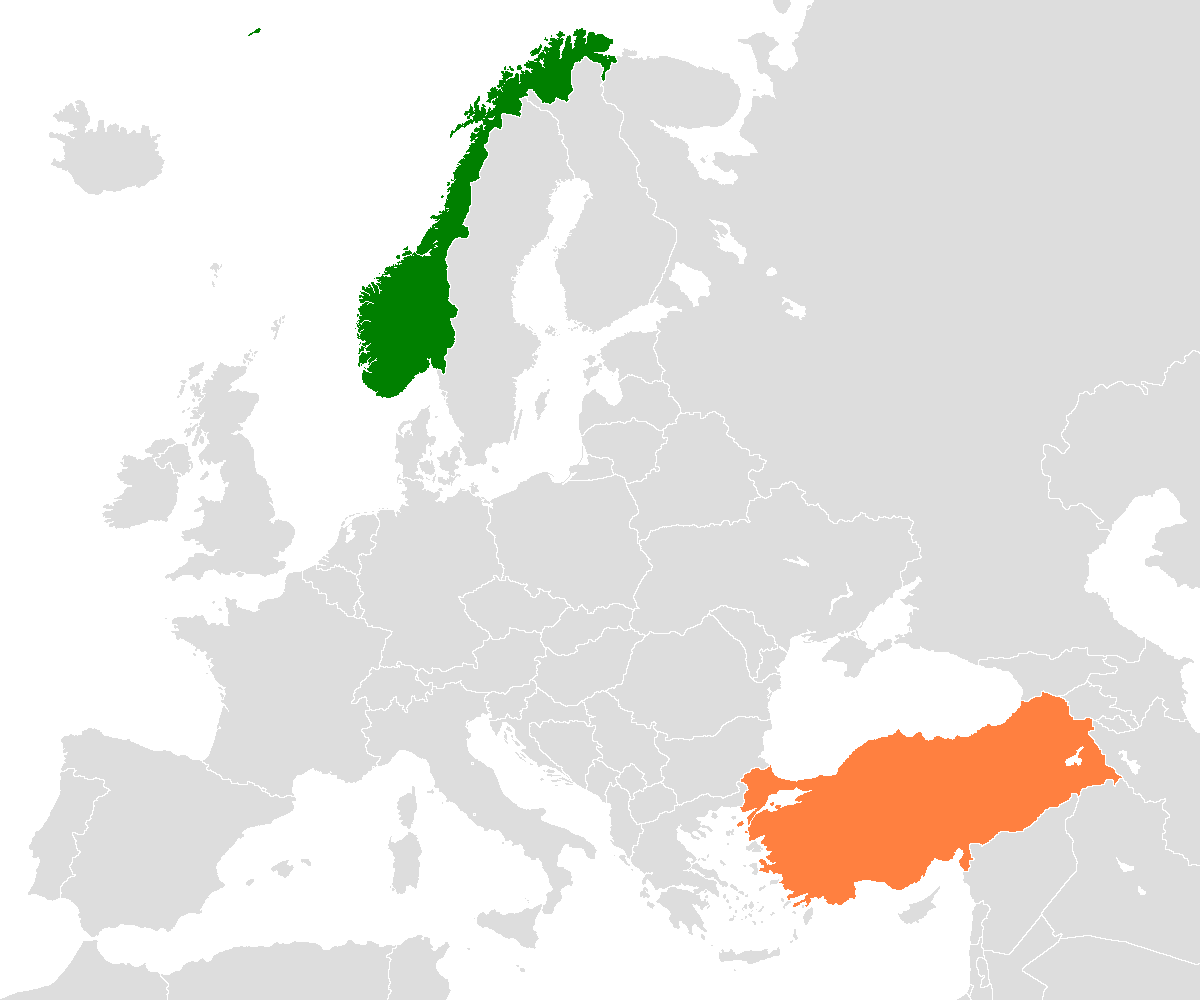
- Norway: Turkey

Diplomatic mission
- Embassy of Norway, Ankara: Embassy of Turkey, Oslo

Norway–Turkey relations are foreign relations between the Kingdom of Norway and the Republic of Türkiye. The bilateral relations were established in 1926. Both nations are members of NATO, World Trade Organization and the United Nations.

== Diplomatic relations ==
Diplomatic relations between Turkey and Norway were first established in 1926. Since then, bilateral relations have been maintained within the framework of mutual peace and friendship. Due to their NATO membership, the two countries are also militarily allies. The embassies of Turkey and Norway operate reciprocally. In addition, Norway has honorary consulates in Istanbul, Antalya, İzmir, Alanya and İskenderun. Official contacts between countries have been maintained mostly at the level of ministries.

== Economic relations ==
The commercial relations between Turkey and Norway gained momentum in the 2000s and the mutual foreign trade volume exceeded the level of 1 billion dollars for the first time in 2008. The foreign trade volume 1.27 billion dollars in 2018, 513 million dollars of which was exports from Turkey to Norway and 765 million dollars was exports from Norway to Turkey. The main products exported from Turkey to Norway are passenger and fishing vessels, automobiles, motor vehicles and textile products. The main products imported from Norway are petroleum products, fish, ferroalloys, polymers, newsprint and fish oil.

The majority of Norwegian investments in Turkey are in the energy and shipping sectors. Between 2002 and 2018, Norway made US$862 million in direct investments in Turkey.

The EFTA's first free trade agreement was with Turkey in 1991. In 2017, Norway and the European Free Trade Association (EFTA) agreed to update the free trade agreement with Turkey. The agreement now includes services trade, environmental protection, and labor rights. In 2018, the two countries signed an agreement on exchange of financial account information in tax related issues.

== History ==
In October 2021, in the wake of the appeal for the release of Turkish activist Osman Kavala signed by 10 western countries, Turkish president Recep Tayyip Erdoğan ordered his foreign minister to declare the Norwegian ambassador persona non grata, alongside the other 9 ambassadors. Following a statement by the ambassadors, reiterating their compliance with Article 41 of the Vienna Convention on Diplomatic Relations regarding the diplomatic duty not to interfere in host states’ internal affairs, President Erdoğan decided to not expel the ambassadors.

== High level visits ==
Guest	Host	Place of visit	Date of visit
(Turkey) Prime Minister Recep Tayyip Erdoğan	(Norway) Prime Minister Kjell Magne Bondevik	Oslo, and Stavanger, Norway	11–12 April 2005
King Harald V of Norway	(Turkey) President Abdullah Gül	Ankara, and Istanbul, Turkey	5–6 November 2013

== See also ==
- Foreign relations of Norway
- Foreign relations of Turkey
- List of ambassadors of Turkey to Norway
- Norwegian diaspora
- Turks in Norway
- Turks in Europe
