= José Martí Memorial =

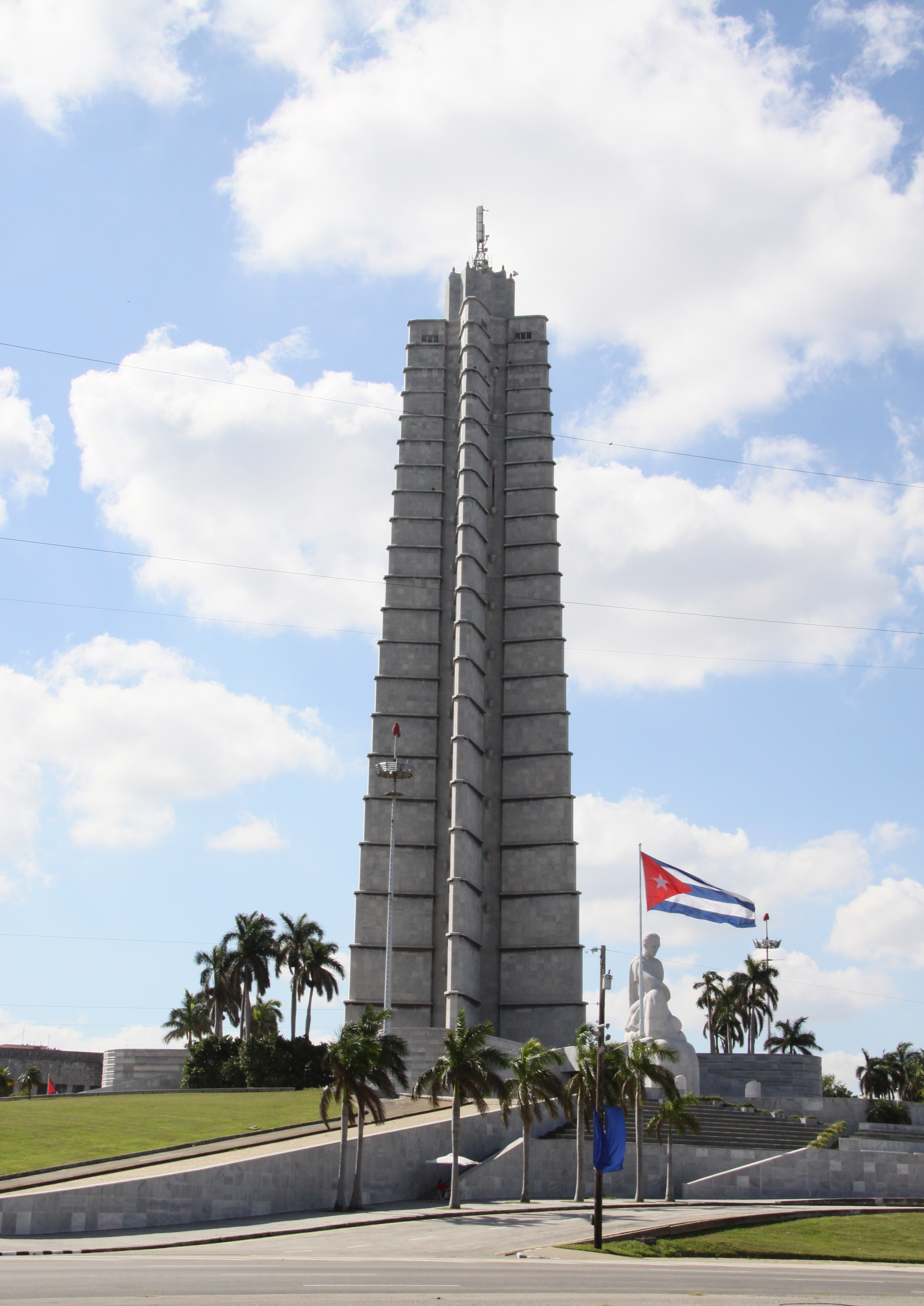

- Location within Cuba

General information
- Location: Havana, Cuba
- Coordinates: 23°07′22″N 82°23′12″W
- Construction started: 1953
- Completed: 1958

Height
- Top floor: 109 m (358 ft)

Design and construction
- Architects: Raoul Otero de Galarraga (chief architect and engineer); Enrique Luis Varela and Jean Labatut (associate architects)

The José Martí Memorial (Spanish: Monumento a José Martí) is a memorial to José Martí, a national hero of Cuba, located on the northern side of the Plaza de la Revolución in the Vedado area of Havana. It consists of a star-shaped tower, a statue of Martí surrounded by six columns, and gardens. It is the largest monument to a writer in the world.

== Design and construction ==
The 109 m (358 ft) tower, designed by Jean Labatut under architect Raoul Otero de Galarraga, is in the form of a five-pointed star, encased in grey Cuban marble from the Isla de Pinos. The design was eventually selected from various entries put forward from a series of competitions beginning in 1939. Entries included a version of the tower topped with a statue of Martí and a monument similar to the Lincoln Memorial in Washington, D.C. with a statue of Martí seated within. The fourth competition, held in 1943, resulted in the selection of a design by architect Aquiles Maza and sculptor Juan José Sicre. In order to proceed with construction of the monument, the Monserrat Hermitage, which occupied the proposed site, had to be demolished. Various impediments to the acquisition of the Hermitage by the state led to delays in the demolition and the start of building work, so by 1952 – when Fulgencio Batista seized power in a coup – work on the construction had still not begun.

Eager to garner popular support after seizing power, Batista committed to pushing ahead with the construction of a monument to Martí; but rather than proceeding with the competition winner, he selected the design that had come third in the competition, created by a group of architects headed by Raoul Otero de Galarraga, a 1905 graduate of Harvard University, and included Enrique Luis Varela, Batista's Minister of Works and his personal friend, and Princeton University Professor Jean Labatut. The monument was Raoul Otero de Galarraga's last major architectural and engineering project and proudest accomplishment. The base was huge and so deep that when looking from above, the men working below grade looked like miniature men and the rebar was so heavy that six to eight men were required to carry each piece. The concrete, used to fill the base, took several days to pour.

The selection of this design caused something of a public outcry; as a result, the design was soon modified. The position of the statue of Martí by sculptor Juan José Sicre (originally atop the tower) was moved to the tower base. Construction of the tower began in 1953 on the 100th anniversary of José Martí's birth. The marble was delivered to Havana from Isla de Pinos, then cut to the chief architect's specifications, and polished in Gallo's factory. Sicre sculpted the huge stones of marble one at a time. Martí's thoughts were set with gold glass mosaic tiles that came from Venice, Italy and was personally inspected by architect and engineer Raoul Otero de Galarraga and his son, Raul Otero.

The right to compensation for the local inhabitants that were forced to move to make way for construction caused further problems. The place was known as Catalan Hill (Loma de Los Catalanes) because the Chapel of the Virgin of Montserrat was built there by Catalan immigrants. The Chapel was finally demolished and the monument was completed in 1958 during the final days of the Batista dictatorship.

== Overview ==
The selected design includes an enclosed observation deck on the top floor, the highest point in Havana, accessible by elevator which gives commanding views over the city in all directions. Housed on the ground floor of the tower which overlooks the city, the memorial features two rooms of correspondence, writings and items from the life of José Martí and displays relating to his life story. A third room illustrates the history of the Plaza de la Revolucion and a fourth room is used for displays of contemporary art. The centre of the tower houses the elevator and features walls decorated with quotes from Martí. Among other items on display is a replica of the sword of Simón Bolívar presented to Fidel Castro by Hugo Chávez during his visit to Cuba in 2002.

Outside, facing over the plaza and towards the mural of Che Guevara on the Ministry of the Interior on the opposite side of the square, is an 18 m (59 ft) white marble statue of Martí carved in situ by Sicre and surrounded by six half-height marble columns. The platform where the statue is located is used as a podium when rallies take place in the Plaza de la Revolución.

Tourists are able to ascend the memorial and enjoy the best panoramic view of Havana. However, many tourists have complained about the ad hoc charges that are administered by the memorial's officials, which varies wildly depending on the members of staff manning the ticket booths. Imposter groundspeople have been known to charge tourists to ascend the memorial steps.

== Gallery ==
Statue of Martí with Cuban flag

The memorial as seen from a distance

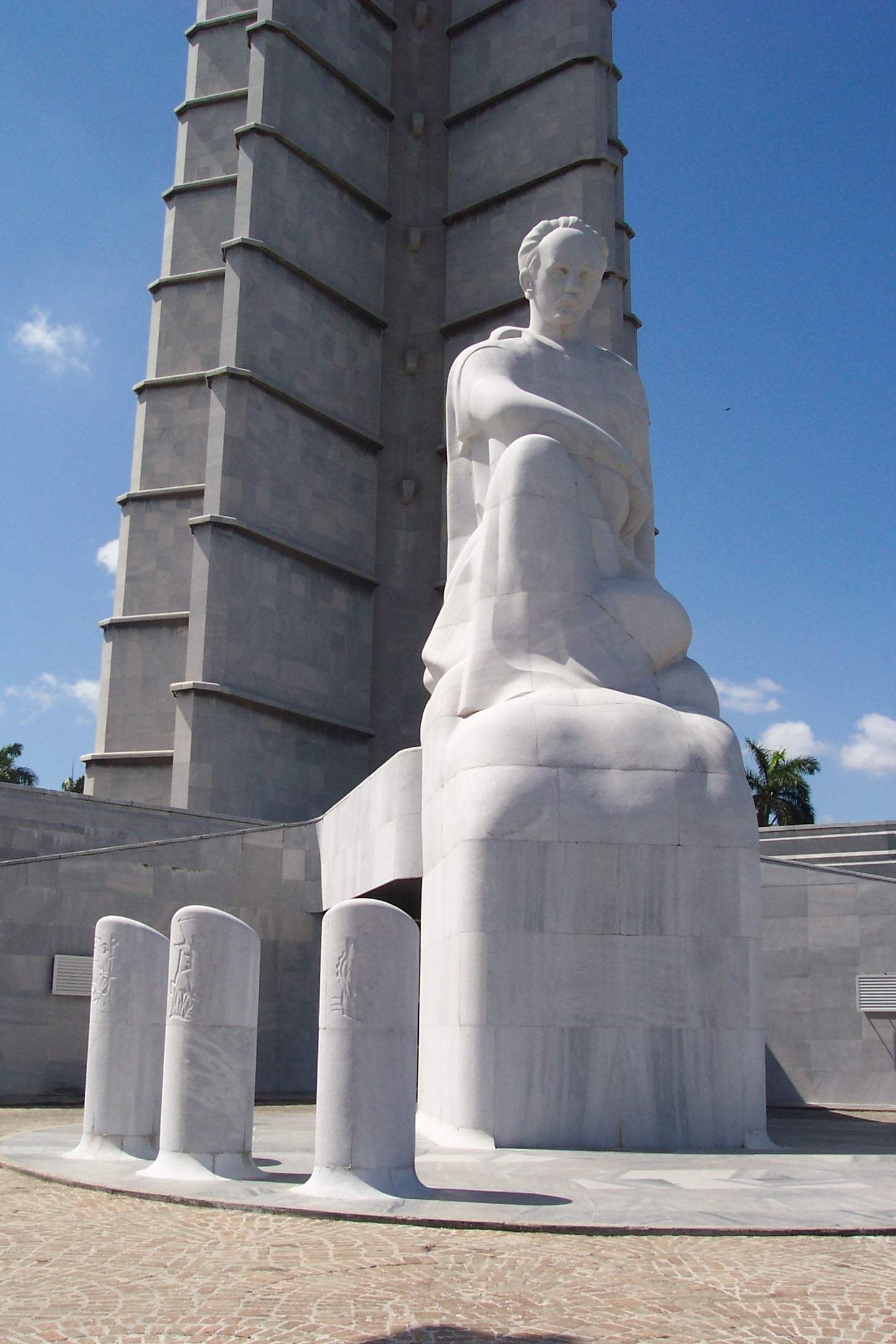
Statue of Martí as viewed from another angle

The memorial as viewed from another angle

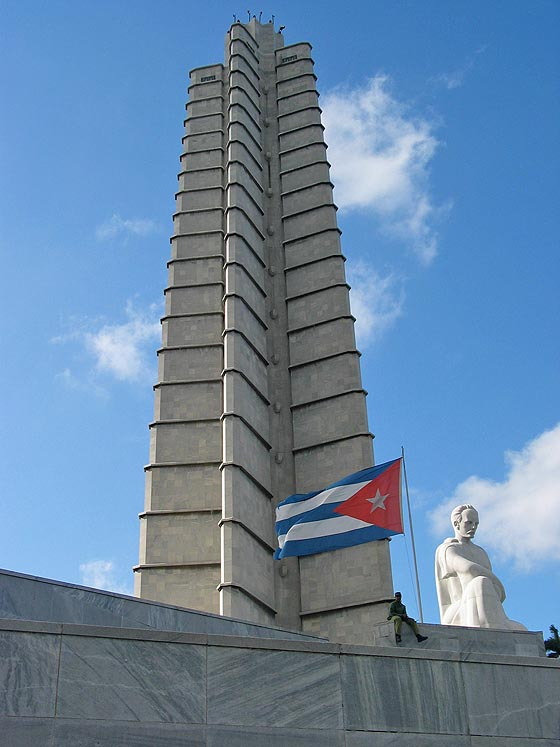
View of the memorial on 16 January 2005

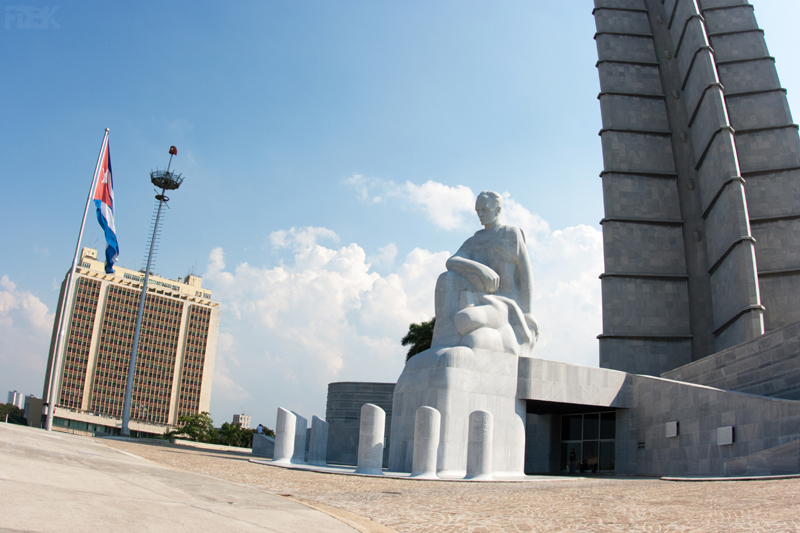
View of the memorial in October 2011

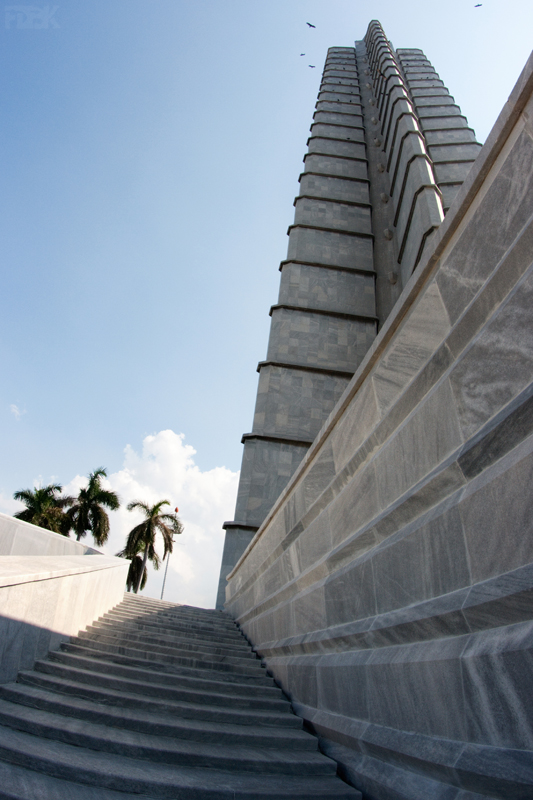
View of the memorial in October 2011

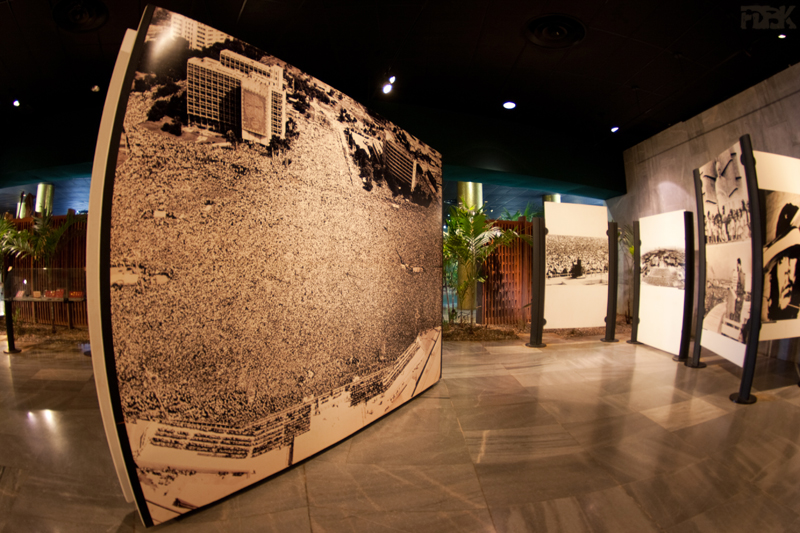
Museum in the base of the memorial in October 2011

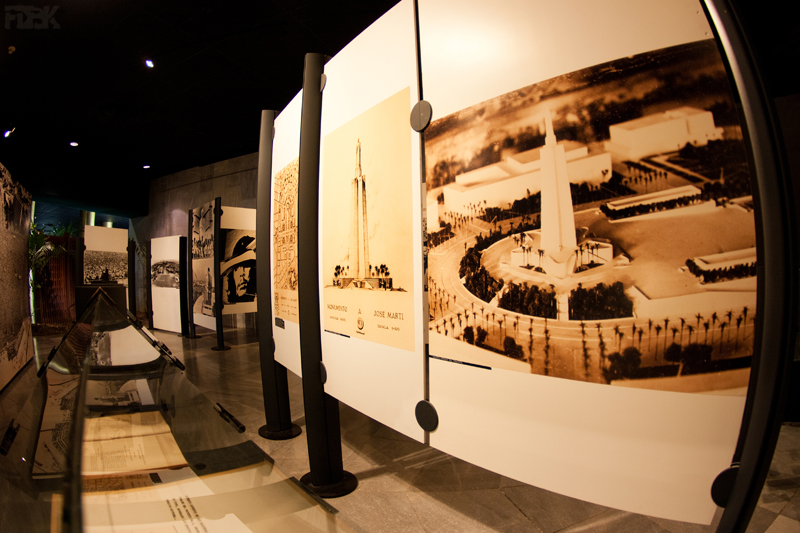
Museum in the base of the memorial in October 2011

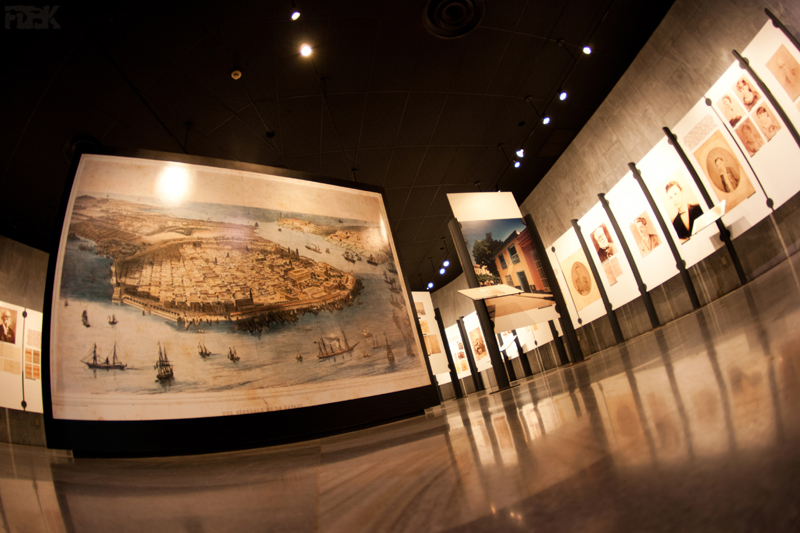
Museum in the base of the memorial in October 2011
