= Jean Labatut (architect) =

American architect (1899–1986)

- Born: Gustave Jacques Marie Jean Labatut; 10 May 1899; Martres-Tolosane, France
- Died: 26 November 1986 (aged 87); Princeton, New Jersey, USA
- Citizenship: French, American
- Education: Beaux-Arts de Paris
- Occupations: Architect, Professor of Architecture
- Years active: 1924-1969
- Spouse: Mercedes Terradell
- Buildings: Plaza de la Revolución, Havana; Castilleja de Guzmán, Spain; Lagoon of Nations, New York; School of Architecture Lab, Princeton University; Stuart Country Day School, New Jersey

Jean Labatut (May 10, 1899 – November 26, 1986) was a French architect, urban planner and, from 1949 to 1967, Director of Graduate Studies in Architecture at Princeton University. He is credited with developing Princeton's School of Architecture into one of the foremost in the United States and was one of the most influential teachers of architecture in mid-20th century America.

== Early life ==
Labatut was born Gustave Jacques Marie Jean Labatut in Martres-Tolosane, a village in the Haute-Garonne department of southwestern France, near Toulouse. He was the son Dominique Labatut, a landowner, and his wife Jeanne Clarac. In Toulouse, Jean attended L'Ecole Privée Saint Stanislas, the Jesuit school Collège du Caousou, and the Lycée National de Toulouse. He served in the French Army Corps of Engineers through World War I, then moved to Paris and, after taking part in a rigorous competition to gain admission, entered the École Supérieure des Beaux-Arts to study architecture.

Labatut thrived in the school’s atelier system, which emphasized collaborative studio work under master architects; Labatut studied in the ateliers of Victor Laloux, Emile Thomas and Charles Lemaresquier. He was also involved with a progressive wing of the Beaux-Arts studio tradition, the Puteaux group, a collective of artists known for their philosophical interests in flux and change, and a fascination for how technology effects our experiences of cities. While at school, he won several prizes, including the Prix Achille Leclère (1922, tied), the Prix Stillman (1923), the Prix Roux (1923), the Prix Godeboeuf (1923), the Prix Chaudesaigues (1924), the Prix de Rome (1924 and 1926) and the Prix Abel Blouet (1926).

== Career ==
Labatut graduated in 1933 but began practicing as an architect in France in 1924 and, from 1926 to 1928, was the consulting city planner for Havana, Cuba, where he worked with Jean-Claude Nicolas Forestier to build the Plaza de la Revolución. From 1926 to 1931, he was associate architect and associate landscape architect for the town, church, residence and gardens of Castilleja de Guzmán in Spain and, beginning in 1927, lectured at the American School of Fine Arts in Fontainebleau, which he would do every summer for the rest of his life.

In 1928, as he was about to marry the American architect Mercedes Terradell, Labatut immigrated to the United States and was appointed Resident Design Critic at Princeton University's School of Architecture. In 1932, Labatut's traffic-solution plan was one of the nine winners in a competition conducted by the city of Paris, a competition in which most of the 150 participants gave up because they could not find a solution. He became a consultant to the Board of Design for the 1939 New York World's Fair, and designed the fair's Lagoon of Nations, where he transformed a pool of water into a multimedia spectacle, with synchronized fountains, colored mists, pillars of flame, searchlights, and noiseless fireworks, all integrated with music to evoke themes such as "The Spirit of George Washington". In 1941, he founded Princeton's Bureau of Urban Research, now the Princeton Urban Imagination Center, an initiative aimed at compiling source materials for urban studies with an emphasis on environmental and spatial planning to better organize man's physical surroundings. During World War II, he created a camouflage course, adapting architectural pedagogy to military needs, with experiments in visual deception, spatial illusion, pattern disruption and long-distance concealment.

As Labatut's reputation as a professor grew, Princeton's architecture program experienced significant growth, with enrollment rising and its reputation solidifying as a national leader, and several students securing Paris Prizes, Rome Prizes, and numerous other accolades. He established America's first PhD in Architecture program and many of his former students became deans of schools of architecture. His list of notable students includes Joseph Norwood Bosserman, J. Robert Hillier, Hugh Hardy, Robert Venturi and Michael Graves. Rodolfo Machado became the Jean Labatut Professor of Urbanism at Princeton. There is now a Jean Labatut Memorial Lectures in Architecture and Urban Planning Fund.

In 1949, Labatut was named Princeton's Director of Graduate Studies in Architecture. That year, he created the Princeton School of Architecture Lab, where studies were conducted on the effects of climate and environment on building materials. This was also a physical project for Labatut; he transformed a former polo stable into a dedicated research space. He added a 40-foot extension with a south-facing glass wall for natural light, and a seven-foot plexiglas ceiling dome with a "sun analyzer" to simulate light effects on models. Interior elements included an observation room for experiments in light, color, and sound, as well as landscaped areas with Norway maple, Japanese cedar, and forsythia to study visual continuity and perceptual orchestration. A third-century Roman mosaic symbolized historical continuity.

Labatut's only independent building commission in the US was the Stuart Country Day School of the Sacred Heart in Princeton, New Jersey (1961–1963). The design incorporated sustainable features such as minimal site disturbance to preserve the 55-acre natural habitat, integrated driveways and parking to reduce the urban heat island effect, and low-maintenance materials like concrete, brick, and glass for longevity. Again, he installed expansive glass walls and strategic window placements to allow natural light to flood learning spaces, and created a seamless indoor-outdoor flow to foster a connection to nature. This approach anticipated modern green building standards, such as those in LEED certification, by embedding ecological awareness into architecture decades before it became mainstream.

== Pedagogy ==
Jean Labatut's theoretical framework emphasized a visual pedagogy that progressed "from inertia to the absolute", conceptualizing architectural experience as a journey from the static materiality of built forms to transcendent spiritual dimensions. This idea, central to his intellectual universe, integrated Phenomenology, mental visibility, and history to reveal resonances between religious thought and architectural perception. Influenced by his collaboration at Princeton with philosopher Jacques Maritain, Labatut infuse his pedagogy with progressive Catholic spirituality, viewing architecture as a medium for ethical and sensory renewal. Labatut's approach prioritized the bodily experience of space, interpreting architecture through engagement and perceptual flux. He advocated for a four-dimensional understanding of space that incorporated human movement, and cultural and spiritual renewal, and a synthesis of timeless values with technological change to foster human-centered design. His pedagogy aimed to define this modern experience as a bodily communion with architecture, which was immediately meaningful and did not require intellectual reflection. His papers continue to facilitate research into his theories.

In 1961, he became the first recipient of the American Institute of Architects award for distinction in education, recognizing his transformative pedagogical influence.

== Honors and legacy ==
In 1950, Labatut co-authored, with Princeton history professor Dr. Wheaton J. Lane, Highways in Our National Life; a Symposium, a collection of essays on the history and significance of the American highway system. As of 2026, the book remains in print.

In 1953, Labatut became a fellow of the American Academy in Rome. In 1973, the University of Virginia awarded him the Thomas Jefferson Memorial Foundation Medal for his lifetime contribution to the advancement of architecture, recognizing him as the “teacher of teachers”. In 1976, Labatut became the first recipient of the Topaz Medal for achievement, an award issued jointly by the American Institute of Architects and the Association of Collegiate Schools of Architecture.

Labatut’s teachings helped shape postmodern architecture and promoted the view that the best way to understand architecture was to experience it. His success as a teacher rested on the clarity of his message: before architects could create modern buildings, they had to first be able to experience buildings in a modern way.

Labatut retired in 1969 and died at his home in Princeton, New Jersey in 1986.
