= Jorge L. Sicre-Gattorno =

Cuban-American painter (born 1958)

- Born: Jorge Luis Sicre y Gattorno; April 15, 1958 (age 68); Havana, Cuba
- Education: University of California, Santa Barbara
- Movement: Neosymbolism
- Spouse: Sandra Marie Hagins (m. 1983)
- Website: jorgesicre.com

Jorge Luis Sicre-Gattorno (né Jorge Luis Sicse y Gattorno; born 1958) is a Cuban-American Neosymbolist painter.

== Biography ==
Jorge Luis Sicre y Gattorno was born on April 15, 1958 in Havana to Jorge Sicre D'Escoubet, a cellist at the Cleveland Orchestra and lecturer at Juilliard, and Candita Gattorno, a psychiatrist. Sicre was the paternal grandson of the sculptor Juan José Sicre, and the cousin of Antonio Gattorno. Sicre grew up in the United States and attended the University of California, Santa Barbara.

Sicre artwork is in museum collections at the Housatonic Museum of Art in Bridgeport, Connecticut, the Museum of Modern Latin American Art in Washington, D.C., and in the Bass Museum in Miami Beach, Florida. In addition to exhibitions in galleries across North America and Europe, Sicre's work has been featured on two high-end fashion accessory lines: Jenellen, Inc., and Icon Shoes, Inc. His paintings were a highlight at an event at the Museo dell’Aeronautica Gianni Caproni in Trento, Italy, and were showcased in the museum's 2008 calendar.

== Personal life ==
On 21 June 1983, Sicre married Sandra Marie Hagins.

== Gallery ==
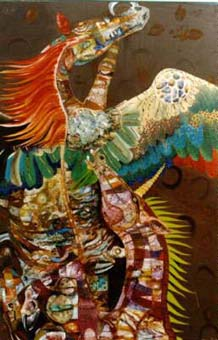
"Unicorn and Pegasus" oil on canvas by J. Sicre.

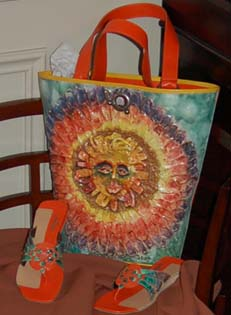
Fashion accessories by Jenellen, Inc., featuring artwork by J. Sicre.
