= Palace of the Revolution =

House of the Cuban government

- Palacio de la Revolución
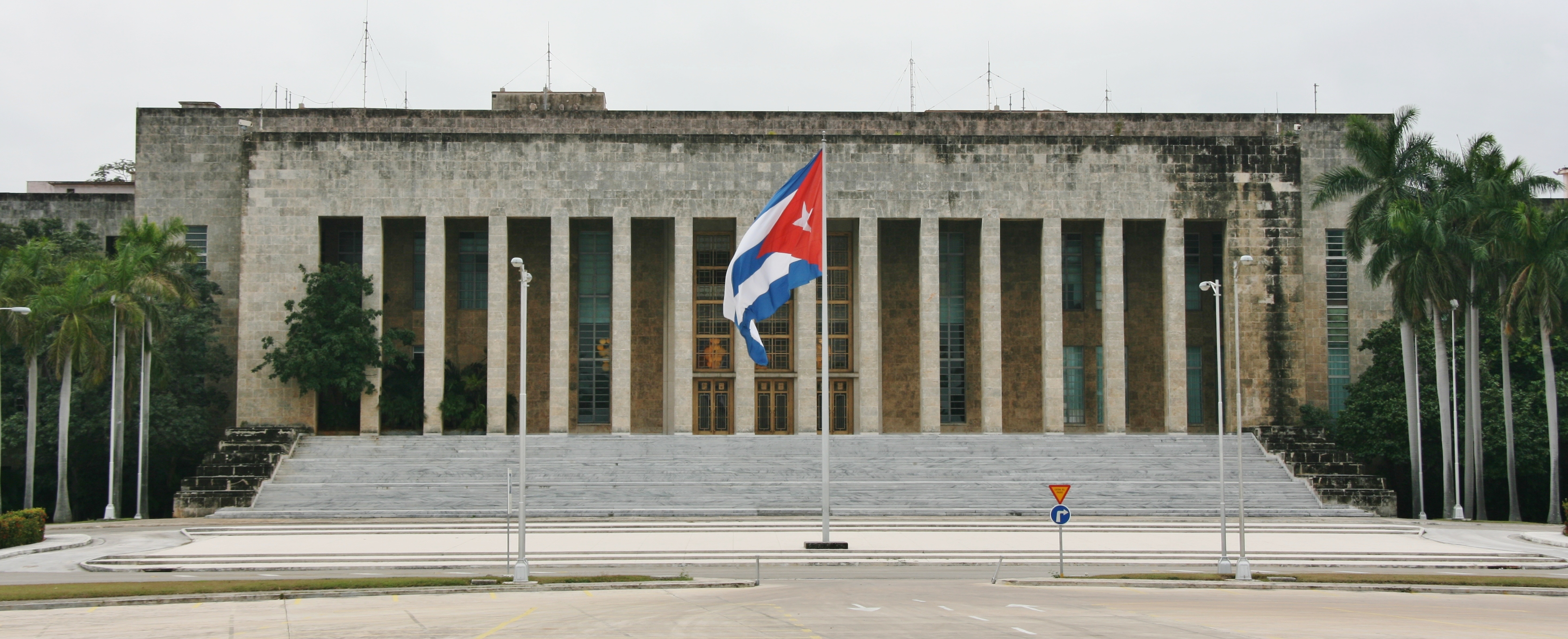
- Palace of the Revolution

General information
- Location: Havana; Cuba
- Current tenants: Miguel Díaz-Canel (First Secretary and President)
- Construction started: 1943; 83 years ago
- Completed: 1957; 69 years ago
- Owner: Communist Party of Cuba; Government of Cuba

Design and construction
- Architect: Pérez Benoita

The Palace of the Revolution (Spanish: Palacio de la Revolución), is a palace in Havana, Cuba within the Plaza de la Revolución that serves as the house of the Cuban government and the First Secretary of the Cuban Communist Party.

== History ==
The order to build the palace was given by then-President Carlos Prío Socarrás in 1943. It was to be the seat of the Supreme Court and the Attorney General. It was designed by the architect Pérez Benoita in 1943, with construction ending over a decade later in 1957. Between 1964 and 1965, transformations were made in the building to adapt it to the current Palace of the Revolution.

In 1965, the revolutionary government led by Fidel Castro ordered the relocation of the seat of government to the palace.

== Functions ==
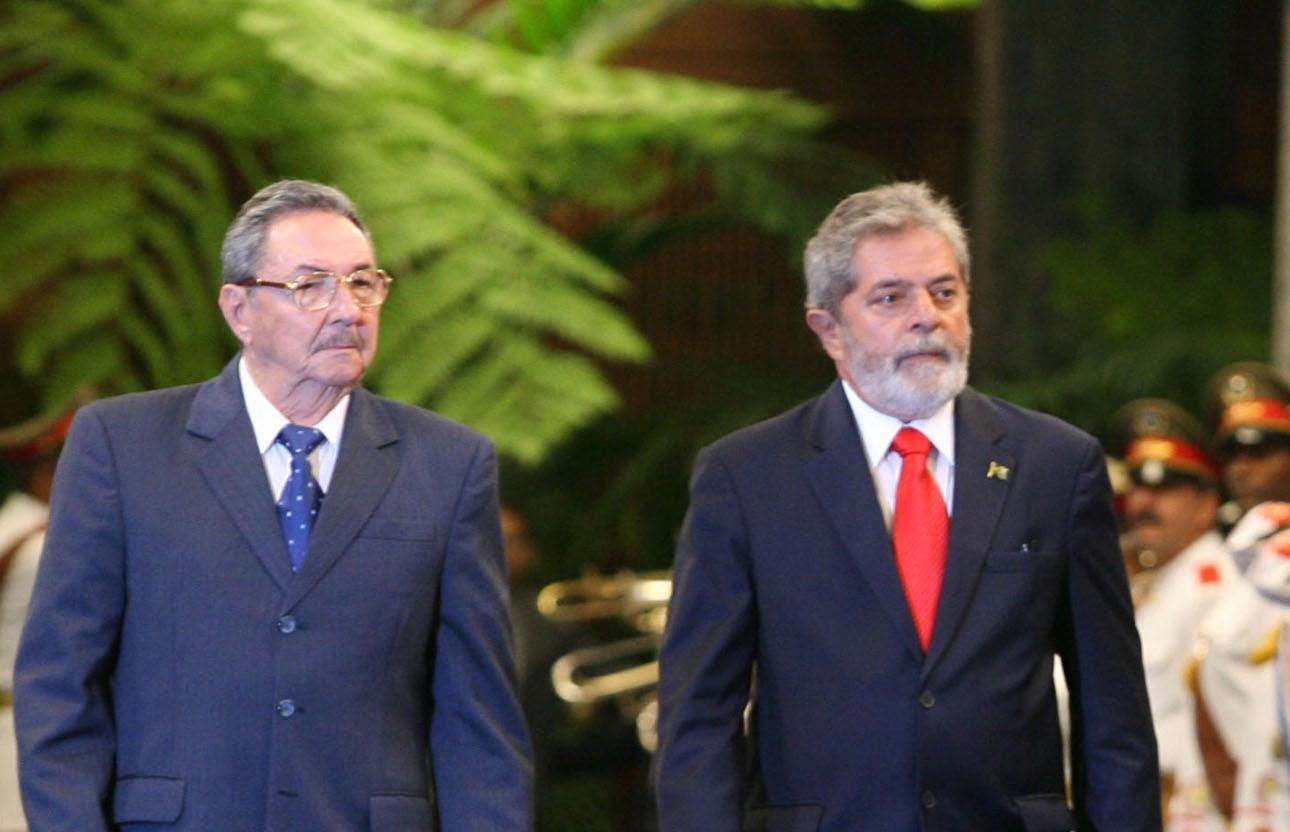
The welcoming reception of Brazilian President Luiz Inácio Lula da Silva in the Fern Room, located in the Palace of the Revolution

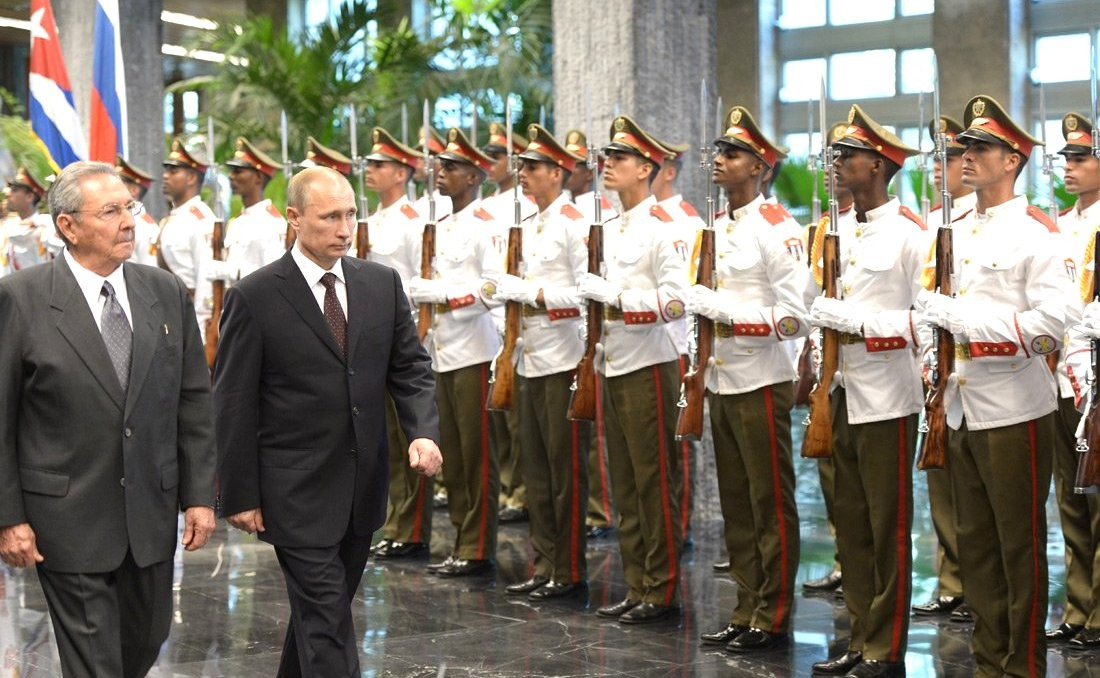
Vladimir Putin inspecting the Ceremonial Unit at the Palace of the Revolution in Havana.

The building is divided into three areas, with the first being the office of the Council of Ministers. The second are the headquarters of the Council of State and the offices of the President and the Vice President. The last is the offices of the Central Committee of the Communist Party of Cuba.

=== Halls ===
- Hall of Ferns - It is named for the large number of fern plants surrounding it. It is here where the First Secretary of the Communist Party of Cuba, President and Prime Minister receive international leaders who visit the nation.
- Presidential Office - The office of the President and First Secretary of the Communist Party of Cuba
- Theater Hall
- Government Hospital.
