= Plaza de la Revolución =

Public square in Havana, Cuba

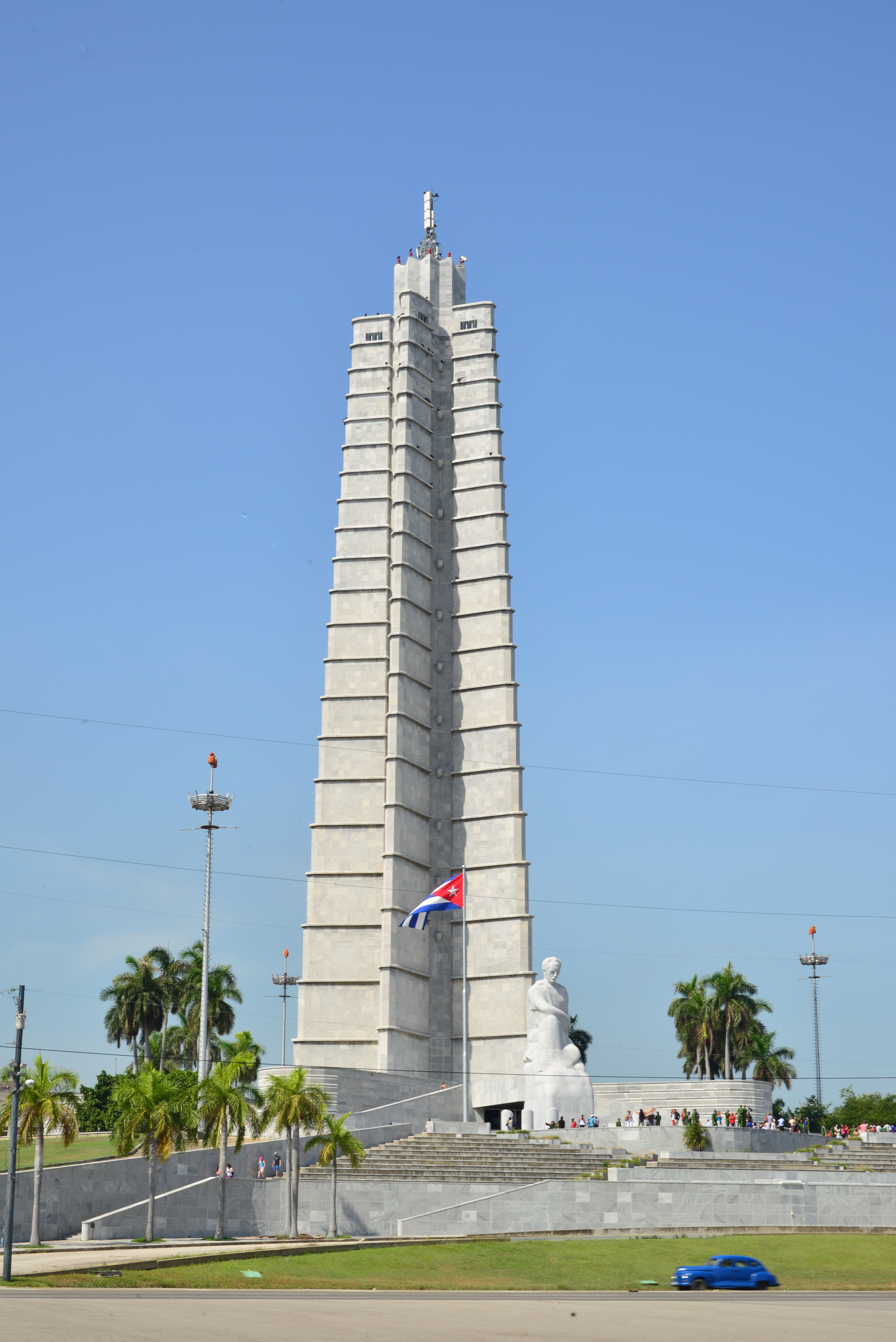

General information
- Location: Havana, Cuba
- Coordinates: 23.12264711063994°N 82.38653427049638°W

Plaza de la Revolución (Spanish pronunciation: [ˈplasa ðe la Revolución]) is a municipality (or borough) and a square in Havana, Cuba.

The municipality, one of the 15 forming the city, stretches from the square down to the sea at the Malecón and includes the Vedado district. The municipality had a population of 139,135 in 2022.

== Loma de Los Catalanes ==
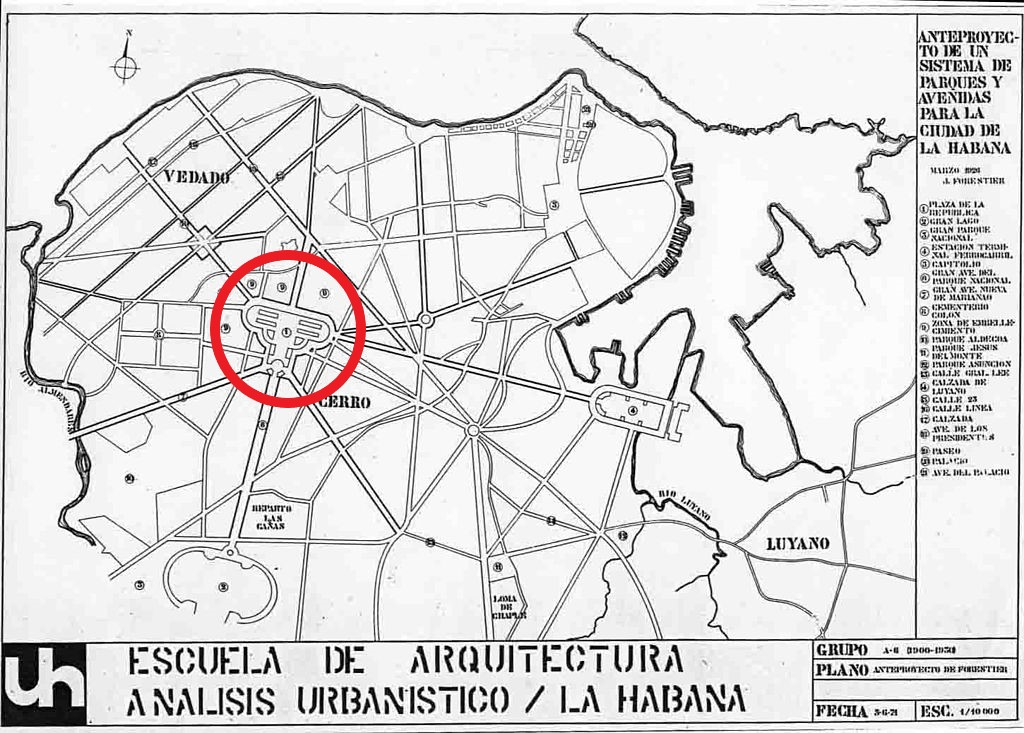
Master plan for Havana by Jean-Claude Nicolas Forestier with red circle showing location of future Civic Center, Havana, 1926

The location of the monument was agreed according to the opinion of Fulgencio Batista in the Loma de Los Catalanes, taking into account the urbanization studies of the architect Jean-Claude Nicolas Forestier in 1926 that pointed to the site as ideal for a larger city. (Note: Jean-Claude Nicolas Forestier was the architect for Paseo del Prado, Havana) It would be the center of a system of avenues and squares, surrounded by public buildings. The avenues were programmed to connect Vedado with Cerro and Jesús del Monte, as planned by the architects Otero, Varela and Labatut. It would be like the center of a system of avenues and squares, surrounded by large public buildings, such as the National Library, various ministries, a museum, the School of Fine Arts, and others. And that was exactly what was done to give birth to the famous Plaza Civica, which is its real name.

== History ==
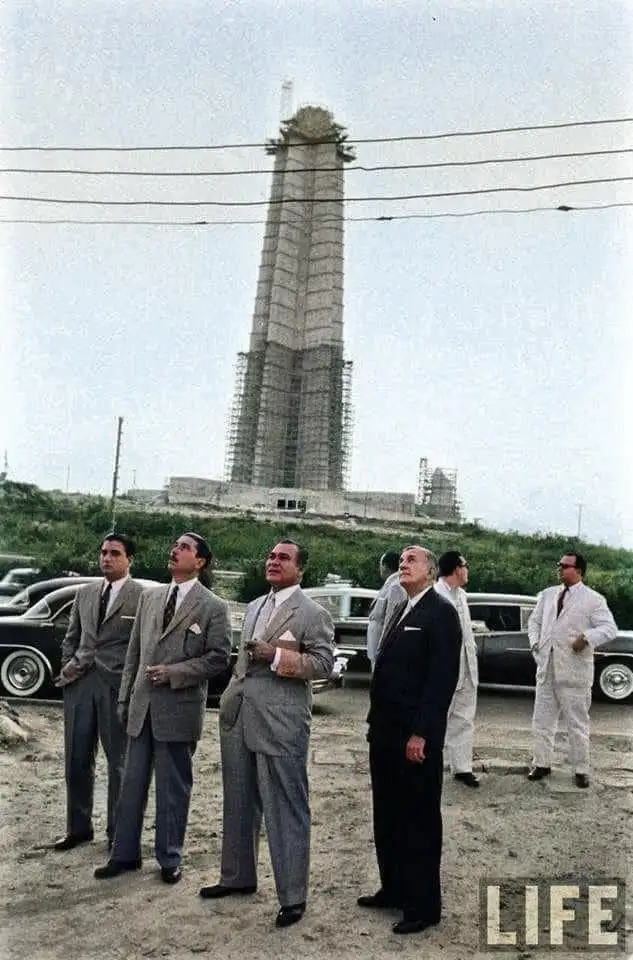
President Fulgencio Batista, Plaza Civica (Havana)

This project was conceived as part of the wave of architectural and infrastructure works carried out by the government of Fulgencio Batista. The Plaza Cívica as was originally called was built during the decade of the 1950s and was part of an old and ambitious project that sought to make the Plaza Cívica the center of the city's road circulation of four avenues that would link the cardinal points of the city starting from it. The square and the memorial were completed in 1959. It was originally called Plaza Cívica. An elevator allows access to the top of the memorial, at 109 m one of the tallest points in the city.

== José Martí Memorial ==
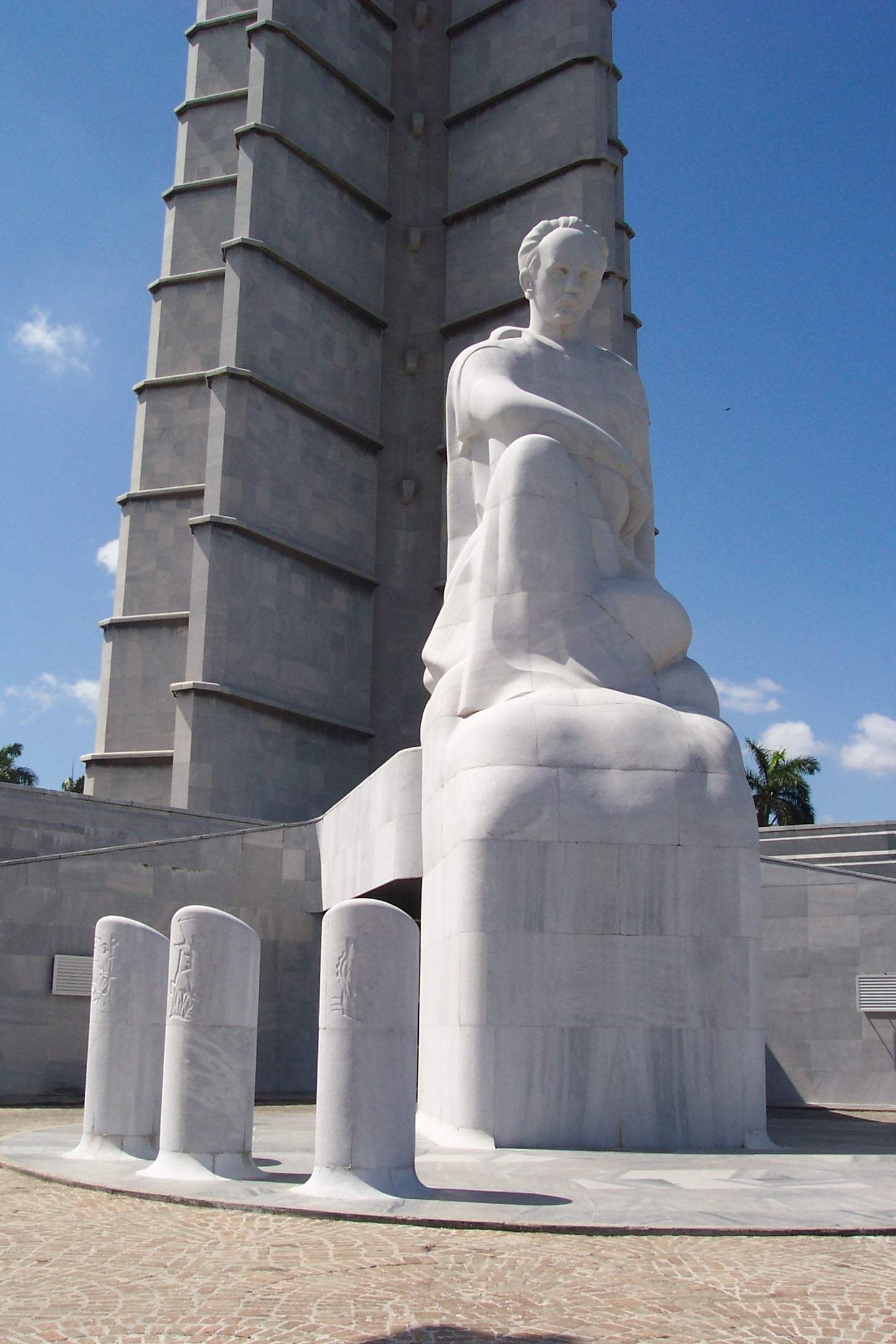
Marti statue

Included in the Plaza project was a monument to the apostle José Martí, which significantly surpassed the Central Park monument in scale by Anna Hyatt Huntington. The Havana project originated years before and was approved in January 1938, while a contest was being called, the winners of which were the sculptor Juan J. Sicre and the architect Aquiles Maza. The José Martí Memorial is located on the northern side of the Plaza de la Revolución in the Vedado area of Havana. It consists (in plan) of a star-shaped tower, a statue of Martí surrounded by six columns, and gardens. It is the largest monument to a writer in the world.

The 109 m (358 ft) tower, designed by a team of architects led by Raoul Otero de Galarraga, is in the form of a five-pointed star, encased in grey Cuban marble from the Isla de Pinos. The design was eventually selected from various entries put forward in a series of competitions beginning in 1939. Entries included a version of the tower topped with a statue of Martí, and a monument similar to the Lincoln Memorial in Washington, D.C., with a statue of Martí seated within. The fourth competition held in 1943 resulted in the selection of a design by the architect Aquiles Maza and the sculptor Juan José Sicre. In order to proceed with the construction of the monument, the Monserrat Hermitage, which occupied the proposed site, had to be demolished. Various impediments to the acquisition of the Hermitage by the state led to delays in the demolition and the start of building work, so by 1952 – when Fulgencio Batista seized power in a coup – work on the construction had still not begun.

Eager to garner popular support after seizing power, Batista committed to pushing ahead with the construction of a monument to Martí; but rather than proceeding with the competition winner, he selected the design that had come third in the competition, created by a group of architects headed by Raoul Otero de Galarraga, a 1905 graduate of Harvard University, and included Enrique Luis Varela, Batista's Minister of Works and his personal friend, and Princeton University Professor Jean Labatut. The monument was Raoul Otero de Galarraga's last major architectural and engineering project and proudest accomplishment. The base was huge and so deep that when looking from above, the men working below grade looked like miniature men, and rebar was so heavy that six to eight men were required to carry each piece. The concrete, used to fill the base, took several days to pour.

The selection of this design caused something of a public outcry, and as a result the design was modified. The position of the statue of Marti by sculptor Juan José Sicre's statue of atop the tower was moved to tower base. Construction of the tower began in 1953 on the 100th anniversary of José Martí's birth. The marble was delivered to Havana from Isla de Pinos, then cut to the chief architect's specifications, and polished in Gallo's factory. Sicre sculpts the huge stones of marble one at a time. Marti's thoughts were set with gold glass mosaic which came from Venice, Italy, and was personally inspected by architect and engineer Raoul Otero de Galarraga and his son, Raul Otero.

The right to compensation for local inhabitants forced to move to make way for construction caused further problems. The place was known as Catalan Hill (Loma de Los Catalanes) because the Chapel of the Virgin of Montserrat was built there by Catalan immigrants. The chapel was finally demolished and the monument was completed in 1958 during the final days of the Batista dictatorship.

The selected design includes an enclosed observation deck on the top floor, the highest point in Havana, accessible by elevator which gives commanding views over the city in all directions. Housed on the ground floor of the tower which overlooks the city, the memorial features two rooms of correspondence, writings and items from the life of José Martí and displays relating his life story. A third room illustrates the history of the Plaza de la Revolucion, and a fourth room is used for displays of contemporary art. The centre of the tower houses the elevator and features walls decorated with quotes from Martí.

Outside, facing over the plaza and towards the mural of Che Guevara on the Ministry of the Interior on the opposite side of the square, is an 18 m (59 ft) white marble statue of Martí carved in situ by Sicre and surrounded by six half-height marble columns. The platform where the statue is located is used as a podium when rallies take place in the Plaza de la Revolución. Tourists are able to ascend the memorial and enjoy the best panoramic view of Havana. However, many tourists have complained about the ad hoc charges that are administered by the memorial's officials, which vary wildly depending on the members of staff manning the ticket booths. Imposter grounds people have been known to charge tourists to ascend the memorial steps.

== National theatre ==
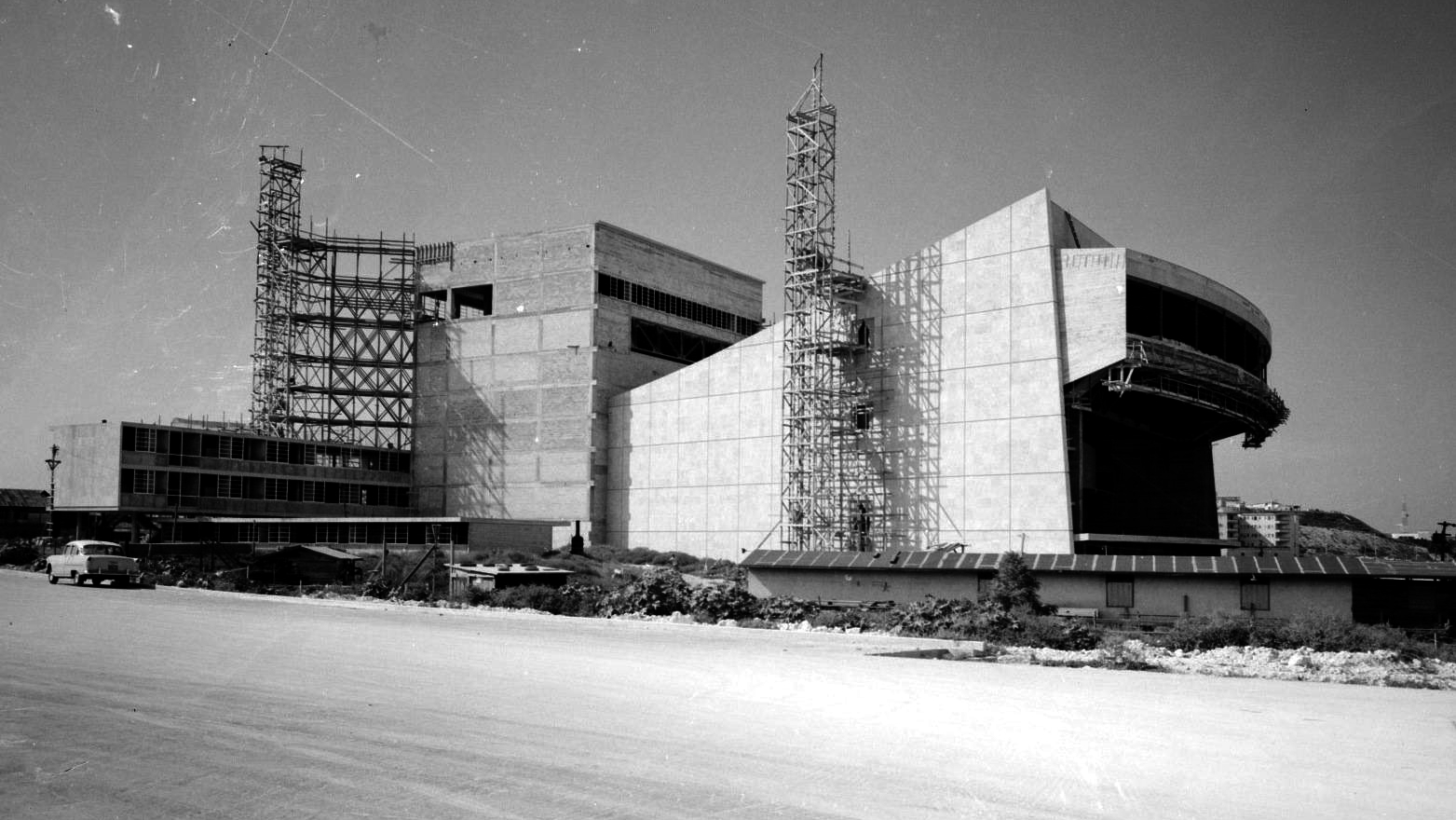
National Theatre of Cuba, July 19, 1957

Construction of the National Theater of Cuba was approved in 1951 under the administration of Carlos Prío Socarrás, work began the following year when President Fulgencio Batista laid the foundation stone.

The first stone for the construction of the National Theater was laid on July 29, 1952, two months later a contract was signed with the company Purdy & Henderson as civil contractor and with the firm Arroyo y Menéndez as technical and optional director of the work. The National Theater was inspired by Radio City Music Hall in New York and was conceived with three rooms: a large one for opera and ballet performances, a small one for dramatic theater, and an "experimental" room, as well as large rooms for dressing rooms, workshops, a library, and academies. It was projected as the largest theater in Cuba and was expected to be completed by July 1954, but the construction was so slow and discontinuous that in 1959, a large part of the work was yet to be done.

The National Theatre has two auditoriums, the Sala Covarrubias and the Sala Avellaneda. The two auditoriums have a combined capacity of 3,500 people, making it one of the largest theatres in the country. Events here include productions from the national ballet, theatre productions, musicals, and orchestra as well as a number of lectures and workshops.

In 1960, the Sala Covarrubias was inaugurated and a series of cultural activities were held during that year, but since March 1961 they stopped presenting shows due to their still precarious conditions, being destined to serve as a rehearsal room and, later, for storage of sets. and furniture. It is not until the second half of the 1970s that the completion of the building is assumed, being its complete and definitive inauguration on September 3, 1979.

== Square ==
The Plaza is the 60th largest city square in the world, measuring 72,000 square metres (780,000 sq ft).

The square is notable as being where many political rallies take place and Fidel Castro and other political figures address Cubans. Fidel Castro addressed more than a million Cubans on many important occasions, such as 1 May and 26 July each year. Pope John Paul II, during his 1998 first visit by a pope, and Pope Francis in 2015, held large Masses there during papal visits to Cuba.

The square is dominated by the José Martí Memorial, which features a 109 m-tall (358 ft) tower and an 18 m (59 ft) statue. The National Library, many government ministries, and other buildings are located in and around the Plaza. Located behind the memorial is the Palace of the Revolution, the seat of the Cuban government and Communist Party. Opposite the memorial are the offices of the Ministries of the Interior and Communications, whose facades feature matching steel memorials of the two most important deceased heroes of the Cuban Revolution: Che Guevara, with the quotation "Hasta la Victoria Siempre" (Ever Onward to Victory) and Camilo Cienfuegos, with the quotation "Vas bien, Fidel" (You're doing fine, Fidel). It is also the site of several cultural institutions.

== Gallery ==
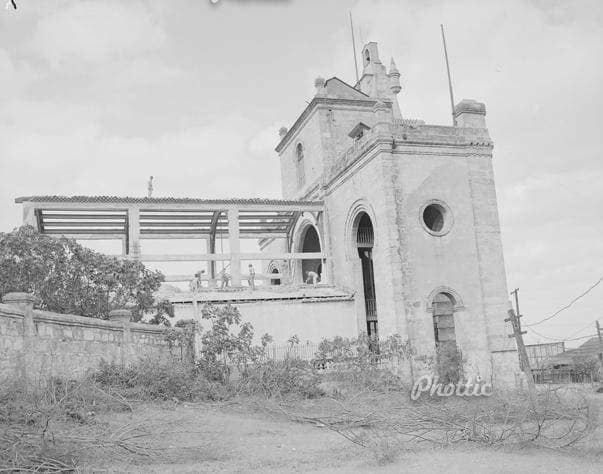
Demolition of the Hermitage of the Catalans, 1951.

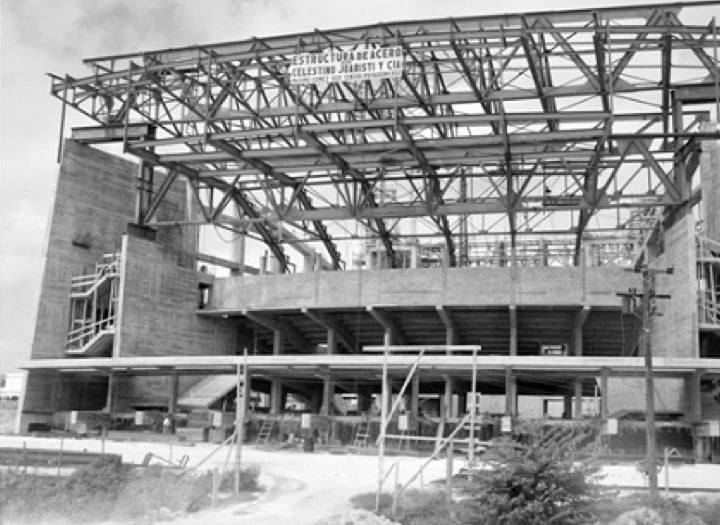
National Theatre of Cuba

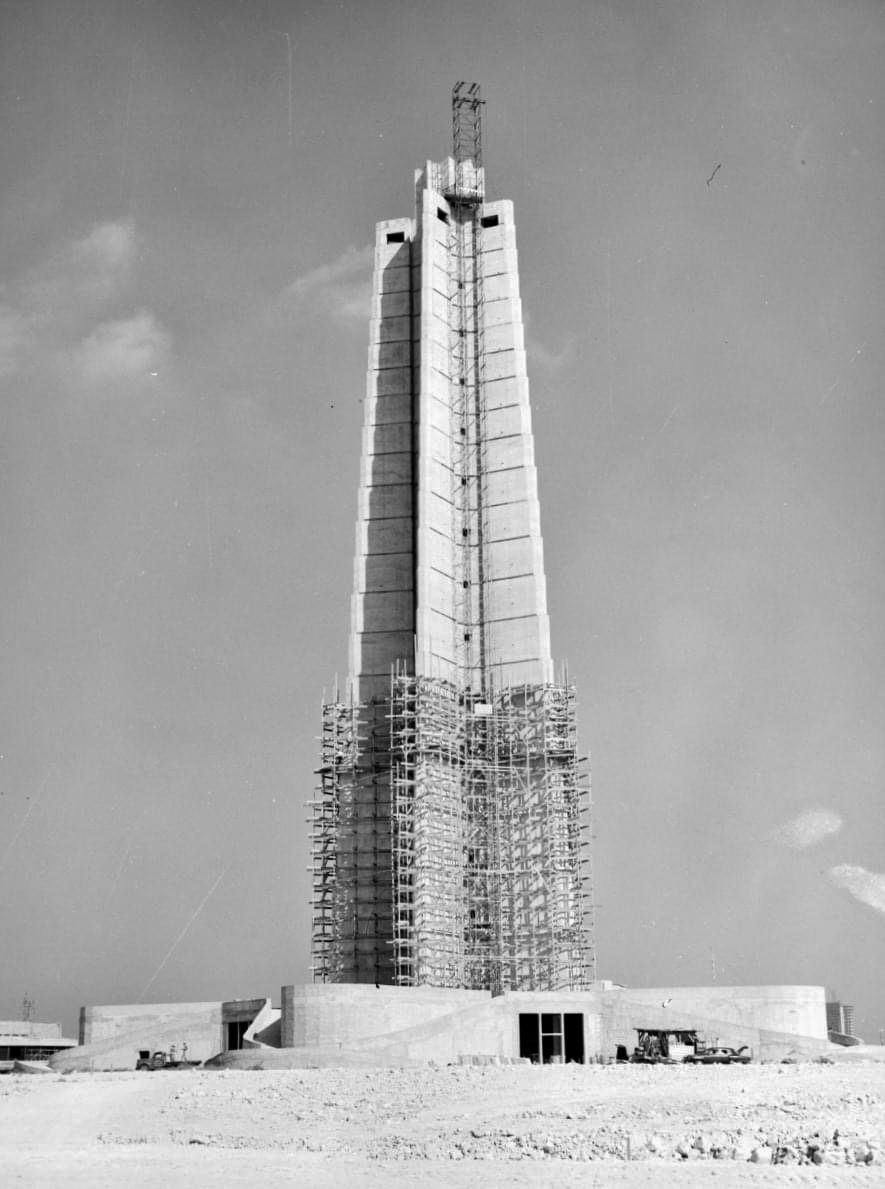
Memorial under construction

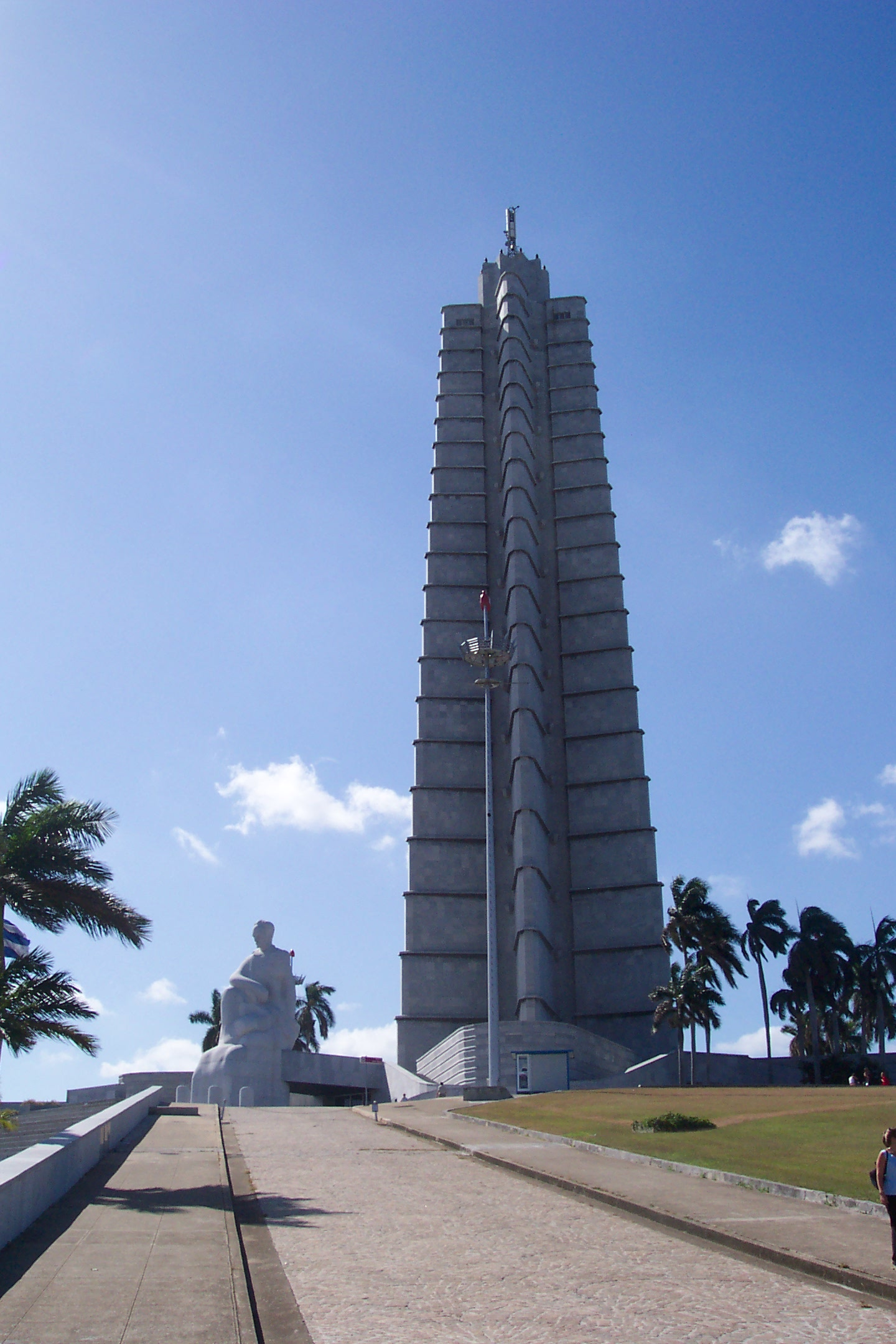
Jose Marti Memorial and lookout

== See also ==
- Hermitage of the Catalans, Havana
- Jean-Claude Nicolas Forestier
- National Theatre of Cuba
- Havana Plan Piloto
