= Juan José Sicre =

Cuban sculptor (1898–1974)

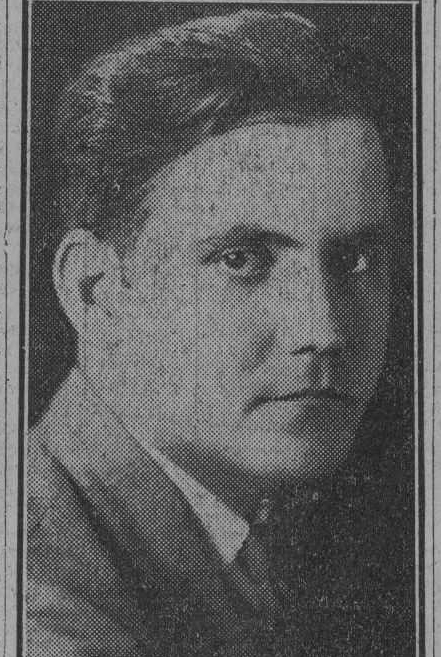
- Sicre in 1927
- Born: 19 December 1898; Matanzas, Cuba
- Died: 20 August 1974 (aged 75); Cleveland, Ohio, US
- Education: Academia Nacional de Bellas Artes San Alejandro
- Notable work: Statue of Martí at José Martí Memorial
- Spouse: Silvia D'Escoubet (m. 1929, died)
- Children: 1
- Relatives: Jorge L. Sicre-Gattorno (grandson); José Gómez-Sicre (cousin)

Juan José Sicre Velez (19 December 1898 – 20 August 1974) was a Cuban sculptor, best known for his Statue of Martí at the José Martí Memorial. Sicre lived in exile in the United States following the Cuban Revolution.

== Early life and education ==
Sicre was born on 19 December 1898 in Matanzas. Sirce was the elder cousin of José Gómez-Sicre, a lawyer, art critic and writer. In 1916, Sicre began studying at the Academia Villate. Sicre later enrolled at the Academia Nacional de Bellas Artes San Alejandro in 1918. Awarded a scholarship in 1920, Sicre travelled to Madrid where he studied under Victorio Macho and Manolo Hugué. Sicre later studied in Paris under Antoine Bourdelle, and in Florence before returning to Cuba in 1927.

== Career ==
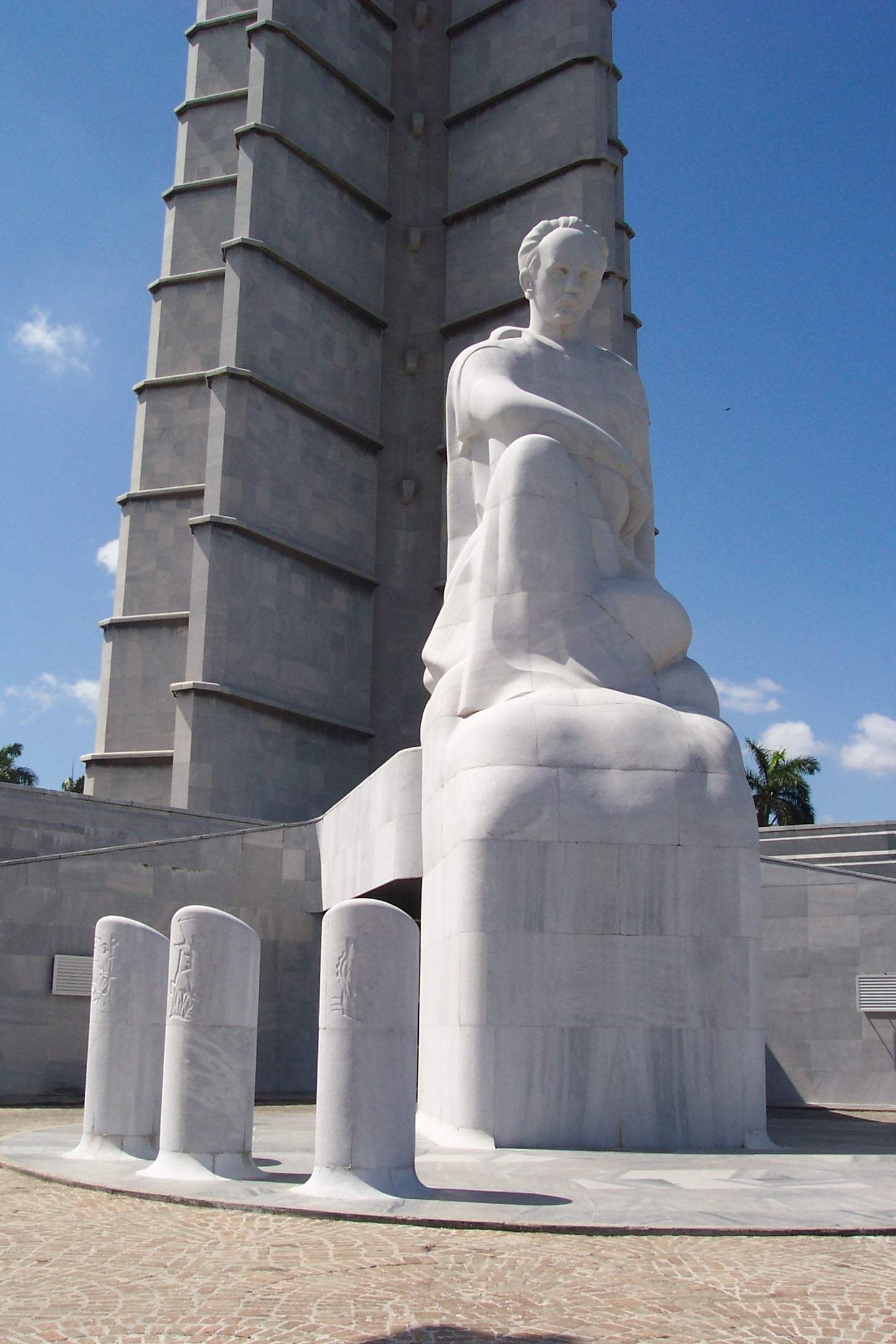
Sicre's Statue of Martí at the José Martí Memorial

Upon his return to Cuba, Sicre began teaching sculpture at Academia Nacional de Bellas Artes San Alejandro. Sicre's students included the sculptures Jilma Madera and Agustín Cárdenas. Alongside Antonio Gattorno and Víctor Manuel García Valdés, Sicre played a pivotal role in introducing European modern art style to Havana, and began Cuba's Modern Art Movement. Sicre was a regular contributor to the avant garde magazine Revista de Avance, which helped to establish a Cuban national identity in the arts from 1927 to 1930.

He is best known in Cuba for his huge monuments to José Martí, Simón Bolívar, and Victor Hugo, all located in Havana. He also did statues of Eugenio María de Hostos in the Dominican Republic and of Alexandre Sabès Pétion and the Heroes of the Battle of Vertières in Haiti. In the United States he has a bust of John F. Kennedy at the Inter-American Development Bank. He also has in Washington, DC busts of Henry Clay, José Cecilio del Valle and Rubén Darío at the OAS Building. In Gainesville, Florida, there is a bronze head of Martí at the Center of Latin American Studies of the University of Florida. In Caracas, Venezuela, he produced a monument to Rómulo Gallegos.

Following the Cuban Revolution, Sicre lived in exile in the United States.

== Personal life ==
On 24 October 1929, Sicre married Silvia D'Escoubet (1912–1968), with whom he had one son. Sicre was the grandfather of the painter Jorge L. Sicre-Gattorno.

On 20 August 1974 Sicre died in Cleveland, aged 75.
