= Joaquín Badajoz =

American poet

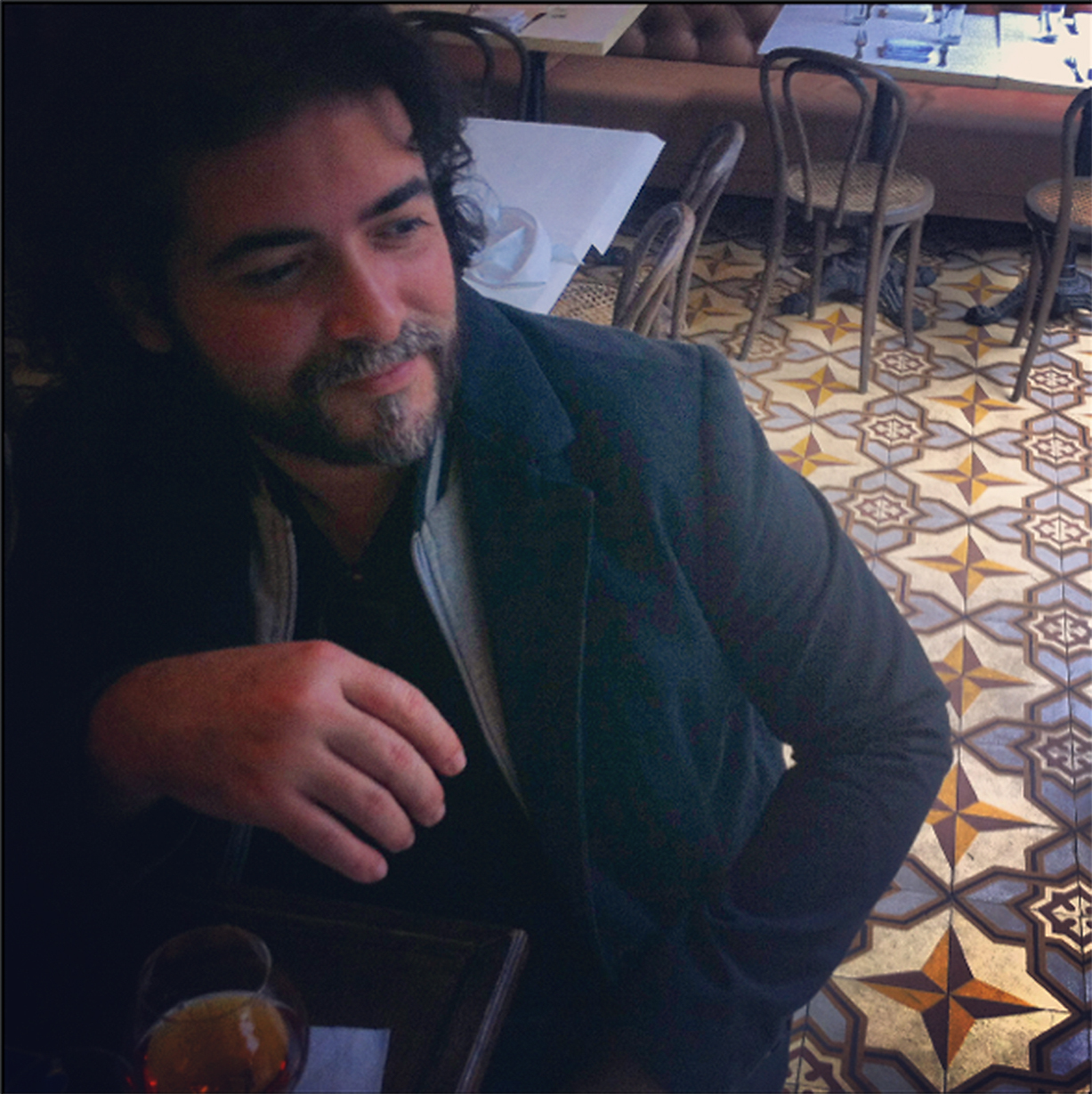
Joaquín Badajoz Cuban-American writer, editor, translator and journalist
- Born: 2 August 1972 (age 54); Pinar del Río, Cuba
- Occupations: Writer, Journalist, Editor and Translator
- Writing career
- Genres: Poetry, fiction, art criticism, essay
- Notable works: Passar Páxaros/ Casa Obscura, aldea sumergida; Excursión de Thor a Utgard (essay); El cine en español en los Estados Unidos (in collaboration with filmmaker and writer Roberto Fandiño); España regurgitada (essay).

Joaquín Badajoz is a Cuban-American writer, editor and journalist.

== Boards ==
Badajoz is a member of the North American Academy of the Spanish Language (ANLE), the editorial board Glosas (ANLE), RANLE (ANLE) and OtroLunes. He has been a member of the boards of Cuadernos de ALDEEU (Spanish Professionals in America), Vitral —recipient of prestigious Prince Claus Award 1999— among others.

== Authorship ==
He is one of the authors of the "Encyclopedia of Spanish in the United States", "Hablando (bien) se entiende la gente /Speaking Well Makes the World Go 'Round" (Spanish Edition), Aguilar; 1 edition (February 8, 2010); "Diccionario de Americanismos /Dictionary of Standardized Latin American Vocabulary" (Spanish Edition), Alfaguara (Asociación de Academias de la Lengua Española) 1st edition (April 17, 2010); "The School of Night. Drawings by Arturo Rodriguez" (New York. Island Project, 2014). He is the author of "Passar Páxaros/ Casa Obscura, aldea sumergida" (ANLE/Hypermedia, 2014) and Cántaro (hypermedia americas, 2022).

== Other work ==
Badajoz has extensive experience in the publishing industry. He served as Managing Editor for the Spanish editions of Men's Health and Prevention magazines, and as Executive Editor of Cosmopolitan en español, in partnership with Editorial Televisa. He also held positions such as Front Page Editor at Yahoo until 2015, and Digital Manager at La Opinion and El Diario La Prensa until 2018. Additionally, he was Deputy Editor at The Tablet and Nuestra Voz, and Executive Editor at People en español. Badajoz has also contributed as a columnist and art critic for The Miami Herald—bylines in El País, both in its English and Spanish versions. It is the founder and owner of SpicandProud and Hypermedia America.

== Personal life ==
Badajoz was a lifelong resident of Miami but, since 2015, has been based in New York City. He has resided in Alphabet City and Hell's Kitchen.

== Articles ==
- The Trojan Horse: Displacement and Resilience of the Uprooted Nation: ArtPulse Magazine.
- The Kid in a Candy Store: The Storyteller’s Crossroads: Robert Zuckerman Exhibition Review: ArtPulse Magazine.
- Arnaldo Simón and the disturbing images of Artvertising: ArtPulse Magazine.
- Vincench vs. Vincench: A Dissident Dialogue from Cuba: ArtPulse Magazine.
- “Beware of Strangers of the Persuasive Kind”. Tania Marmolejo Review: Irreversible Magazine.
- Veritas Feminae: a visual encyclical about the immanent feminine: Alec Von Bargen Review: Irreversible Magazine.
- The melody of the devil is a candid whisper. On Eduardo Sarmiento's Burning in his own hell. Exhibition catalogue, and curator, along with Carlos Luna.
- Wonderland: The Many Images of Misrepresentation. Rafael Lopez-Ramos Exhibition Review: Artdistricts Magazine.

== Books ==
- Passar Páxaros/ Casa Obscura, aldea sumergida (Poetry/ Spanish): Academia Norteamericana de la Lengua Española/ Hypermedia, Colección Pulso Herido, 2014. ISBN 978-0-692-21176-2
- Cántaro (Poetry/ Spanish): hypermedia americas, 2022. ISBN 9798590078400

== Translations ==
- Cruzar el límite Vol. 1, by Alegria, Malin, Pueblo Fronterizo Series. Originally published in English as "Border town: crossing the line". New York, NY, Scholastic, 2012. 184 p. Translated by Joaquín Badajoz. 2013 International Latino Book Award. Best Youth Latino Focused Chapter Book. SECOND PLACE
- La lista de tontos, by Kowitt, Holly. Translated by Joaquín Badajoz. Originally published in English as "The Loser List". New York, NY, Scholastic, 2012.
- Guerra de quinceañeras Vol. 2, by Alegria, Malin. Pueblo Fronterizo Series. Originally published in English as "Border town: Quince clash". Translated by Joaquín Badajoz. New York, NY. Scholastic Inc., 2013.
- Ser María: Amor y Caos en el Bronx, by Manzano, Sonia. Originally published in English as "Becoming Maria: Love and Chaos in the South Bronx". Translated by Joaquín Badajoz. New York, NY. Scholastic Inc., 2016.
