= Marmolejo (surname) =

Marmolejo is a surname. Notable people with the surname include:

- Adriana Marmolejo (born 1982), Mexican swimmer
- Cirilo Marmolejo (1890–1960), Mexican musician
- Fran Marmolejo (born 1988), Spanish footballer
- Francisco Marmolejo (born 1961), Mexican educational administrator
- Libys Marmolejo (born 1992), Colombian volleyball player
- María de Jesús Díaz Marmolejo (born 1967), Mexican politician
- Marina Marmolejo (born 1971), American judge
- Ricardo Marmolejo (born 1954), Mexican swimmer
- Tania Marmolejo (born 1975), American painter

== See also ==
- José Marmolejos (born 1993), Dominican baseball player
