= Cuba–Philippines relations =

- Cuba: Philippines

Diplomatic mission
- Embassy of Cuba, Kuala Lumpur (accredited): Embassy of the Philippines, Mexico City (accredited)

Cuba and the Philippines were both former Spanish colonies. Spanish rule on both countries was ended by the victory of the United States in the Spanish–American War as provisions of the Treaty of Paris giving Cuba independence and the Philippines becoming a new possession of the United States.

== History ==
=== Early history ===
Cuba and the Philippines have been in existence for centuries. In the early 16th century, Filipinos reached Cuba via the Manila-Acapulco Galleon that linked New Spain (Mexico) to the Orient. Filipinos who were brought by the Spaniards to Cuba were altar boys, catechism leaders, and church workers. Pinar del Río is famous for their cigars, which were brought over from the Philippines by the Spanish because it was much closer to Europe and easier to oversee. Afterwards, some Filipinos moved to Havana's big Barrio Chino or Chinatown. The Philippines and Cuba were both dominated by the Spanish Crown for several centuries; in 1896, Filipino nationalist José Rizal was permitted by Governor General Ramón Blanco to serve as a military doctor in Cuba, but was arrested en route to the country after the Philippine Revolution began. Spanish rule over both territories ended at the turn of the 19th century with Spain's defeat by the United States and Philippine revolutionaries. Both countries fell under American rule after Spain ceded Puerto Rico, Philippines, and Cuba to the United States for twenty million US dollars. Later on, Cuba gained its Independence while the Philippines continued to be under the American rule. On July 4, 1946, the Philippines gained its independence, and formal diplomatic relations between the Philippines and Cuba were established in the same month.

=== Contemporary era ===
Diplomatic relations between Cuba and the Philippines were disrupted in 1961. In October 1962, President Diosdado Macapagal declined to sever relations between Cuba and the Philippines, stating that doing so "would mean war", and placed the blame on his predecessor Carlos P. Garcia's administration for maintaining ties to the country after Fidel Castro took power in 1959. Relations were formally restored with the signing of a joint statement by former Prime Minister Fidel Castro and former Philippine First Lady Imelda Marcos in Havana on August 26, 1975.

The Philippines, despite being a long-time of ally of the United States, which has currently unfavorable relations with Cuba, has voted against the United States embargo against Cuba in UN General Assembly resolutions.

In July 2011, both countries celebrated their 65th year of diplomatic relations.

On October 31, 2012, the Philippine government closed its embassy in Havana along with three other embassies in Stockholm, Sweden, Bucharest, Romania, Helsinki, Finland, and the consulate in Saipan. The closure was part of the Philippines' Department of Foreign Affairs austerity measures and restructuring plan. The Philippines, however, assured the closing of its embassy in Cuba will not affect the diplomatic relations of the two countries. Presidential Spokesperson Edwin Lacierda said in a news briefing, "There will be no effect, closing down of Consular offices is internal to us, so there is no effect on them (concerned countries), as long as we have presence there... we [will] have diplomatic relations. The diplomatic relations is not diminished by the cutting down of Consular offices in their countries."

In June 2013, former Cuban ambassador to the Philippines Jorge Rey Jiménez announced that they will close their embassy in Makati citing financial difficulties brought by the global economic crisis and the United States’ embargo. All consular and diplomatic relations with the Philippines were then assumed by the Cuban Embassy in Kuala Lumpur.

== Socio-cultural relations ==
Cuba and Philippines share socio-cultural similarities mostly due to their Hispanic heritage brought by Spanish colonial rule for more than three hundred years. Both countries are predominantly Catholics, and celebrate town fiestas. The two countries also share the concept of "Padre de Familia" where the father heads the family and the mother, along the children, recognizes the father's decision. Spanish names and family names are also apparent among the two countries.

=== People ===
Filipino Cubans include the Azcarraga Fessner family, whose patriarch was Marcelo de Azcarraga y Palmero, the first Prime Minister of Spain with Indian blood, whose mother was a Filipina from the Lizarraga and Palmero families. Cuban Filipinos include Lieutenant Gabriel Badelly Méndez a Cuban member of the Philippine army and Vicente Catalan, Chief Admiral of the Philippine Revolutionary Navy and a Cuban of Criollo descent.

The Pinar del Rio Province in Cuba, was formerly called "Nueva Filipinas" in the 18th century due to mass immigration of Filipinos and other Asians to the area to work in the region's tobacco industry. Asians immigrated to Cuba through the Manila-Acapulco galleon trade route and they were known generally known as "Chinos Manila".

== Diplomatic missions ==
- Cuba is accredited to the Philippines from its embassy in Kuala Lumpur, Malaysia.
- Philippines is accredited to Cuba from its embassy in Mexico City, Mexico.

== See also ==
- Foreign relations of Cuba
- Foreign relations of the Philippines
- Filipino Cubans
