= Carlos Luna =

Carlos Luna may refer to:

- Carlos Luna (footballer)
- Carlos Luna (volleyball)
- Carlos Luna (artist)
- Carlos Luna, performer and producer on actual play roleplaying game series Dimension 20
