= Plaza Garibaldi =

Public square in Mexico City, Mexico

Coordinates: 19.441°N 99.139°W

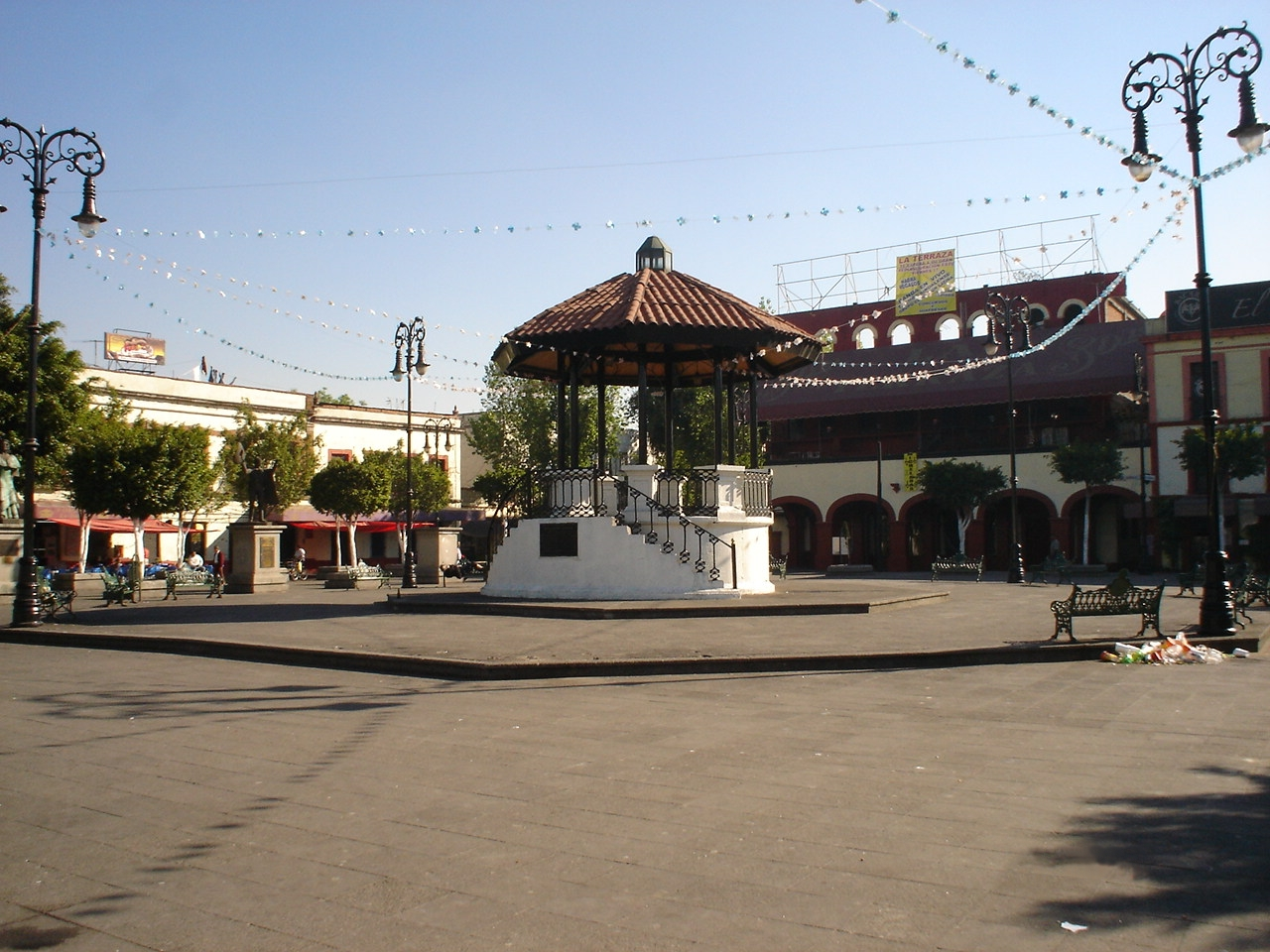
- Plaza Garibaldi in 2007
- Interactive map of Plaza Garibaldi
- Location: Mexico City, City

Plaza Garibaldi is located in monumental downtown, Mexico City, on Eje Central (Lázaro Cárdenas) between historic Calle República de Honduras and Calle República de Peru, a few blocks north of the Palacio de Bellas Artes. The original name of this plaza was Plaza Santa Cecilia, but in 1920, at the conclusion of the Mexican Revolution, it was renamed in honor of Lt. Col. Peppino Garibaldi, who joined with the Maderistas in the attack on Casas Grandes, Chihuahua, during the Revolution. The Garibaldi Metro station is named after this plaza.

The Plaza is known as Mexico City's home of mariachi music. All throughout the day and night, mariachi bands can be found playing or soliciting gigs from visitors to the Plaza. The Salón Tenampa, which became the home of mariachi music in Mexico City in the 1920s, is still in business on the north side of the plaza. The plaza and the neighborhoods around it are undergoing extensive renovations to halt the decades-long degeneration of the area. The plans include a remodeled plaza and extensive rework of the surrounding buildings and streets plus sidewalks, with the goal of making the area safe for visitors at all times. However, as of May, 2013, serious risks remained near the plaza and in the nearby neighborhood of Tepito.

This area was designated as a "Barrio Mágico" by the city in 2011.

== Mariachi mecca ==
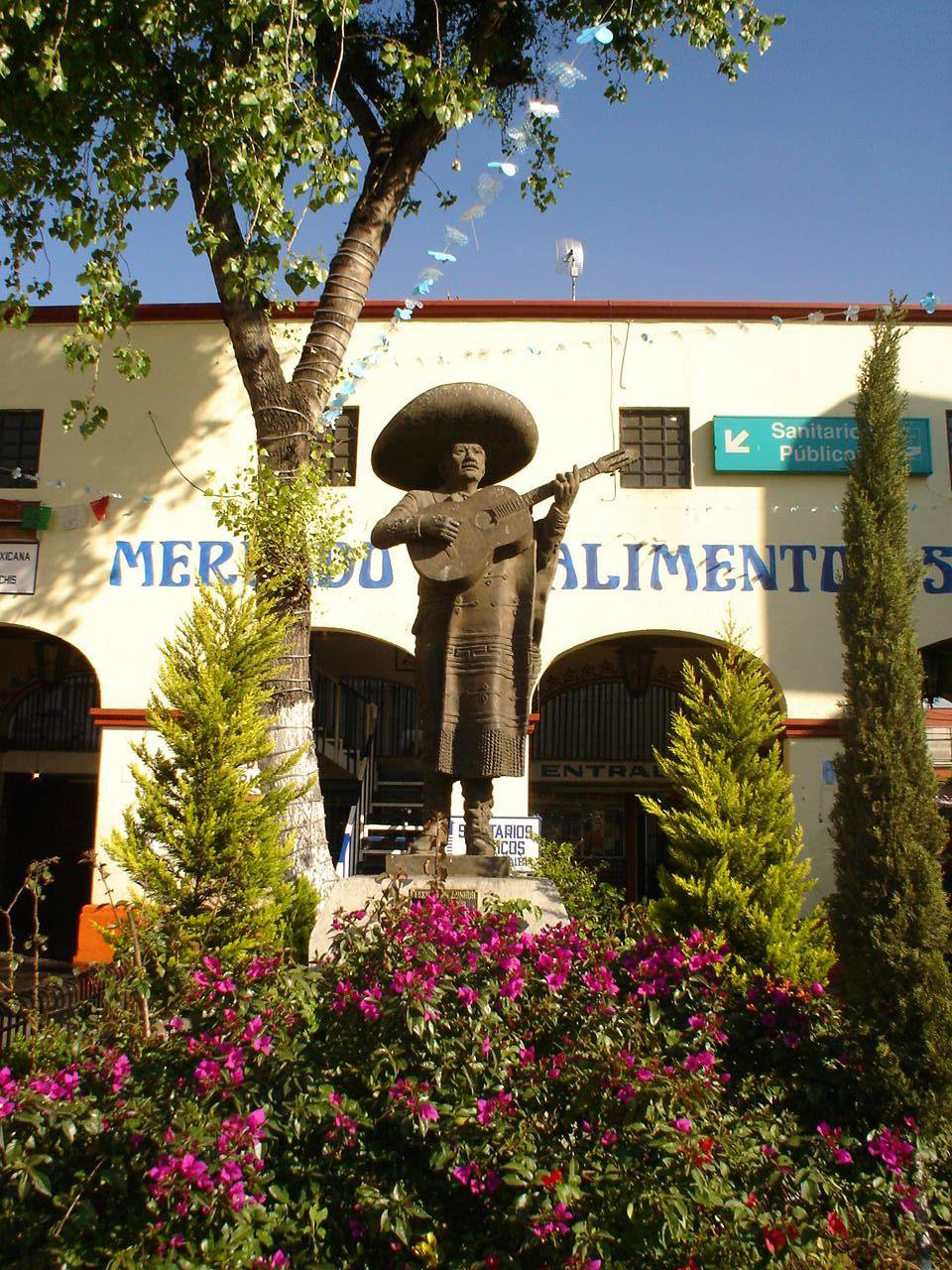
Monument to mariachi

During the Golden Age of Mexican cinema from the 1930s to the 1950s, a genre of movies called "Charro" became extremely popular. These films featured movie stars such as Tito Guízar, Jorge Negrete, José Alfredo Jiménez and Pedro Infante, who would often sing mariachi songs to their leading ladies. On one side of Plaza Garibaldi is the Salón Tenampa, which became a major nightspot in the 1920s when Cirilo Marmolejo and his mariachi band started playing there regularly. Garibaldi Plaza soon attracted other mariachi musicians, who would be paid by gentlemen to sing to their partners in the style of Marmolejo or the Charro movie stars.

The popularity of Charro movies has waned and Marmolejo died some time ago, but mariachi bands can still be found here day and night. These musicians play for the patrons of the bars, nightclubs and pulquerias that still surround the plaza, as well as for passers-by. Mariachi bands also line up on Eje Central in front of the plaza to solicit gigs from passing motorists. Over the years other types of bands, such as trios, jarochos (music groups from Veracruz), and even groups playing modern music, have joined the mariachis on the plaza. The best time to experience the plaza is on a Friday or Saturday night from 11:00 p.m. onwards.

== The Salón Tenampa ==
The Salón Tenampa was founded by Juan Indalecio Hernández Ibarra, originally from Cocula, Jalisco, the birthplace of mariachi. Hernández arrived in Mexico City from Jalisco in 1923 and started a cantina/store on Plaza Garibaldi, naming it El Tenampa. The origin of this name is in dispute. Some say it was the brand name of a Cuban cigar that has since disappeared. Others say it is the name of a ranch in Veracruz and still others say it comes from an indigenous word “tenampal” meaning meeting place.

Hernández opened the establishment to give his fellow “Jalisquenses” a taste of home, with foods such as birria and pozole, as well as tequila and mariachi music. Soon after opening his establishment, Hernández located a mariachi musician he knew in Cocula, Concho Andrade, and convinced him to play at El Tenampa. This began the long tradition of major mariachi bands playing here. However, Andrade's band did not play here long because of the ongoing Cristero War that was causing problems back in Cocula, causing most of the band to return to Jalisco to their families. In 1927, Hernández hired Cirilo Marmolejo to play along with other mariachi groups. While one group played inside the club, another would play for crowds outside in the Plaza. The popularity of mariachi music grew and other big names in the genre, such as José Reyes, would also come and play at El Tenampa. Over the decades, the establishment hosted kings, princesses, presidents, and prime ministers, as well as innumerable politicians, artists and intellectuals from Mexico and abroad. Still located on the north side of Garibaldi Plaza, El Tenampa parties every night until 3:00 a.m., 4:00 a.m. on weekends and holidays.

== The older plaza ==
In 1910, Garibaldi Plaza had a garden in the middle of it. Later, the plaza was completely paved over with a kiosk placed in the center and an arcade placed near the front, by Eje Central. On either side of the plaza were statues of great Charro singers. Along with the Salón Tenampa, bars, restaurants and nightclubs have surrounded the Plaza. Other popular nightspots have included the Guadalajara de Noche, the Nuevo México Típico and the Tropicana. Places to eat include the San Camilito Gastronomic Market, which is filled with small stands serving Mexican food, many specializing in birria. There is a pulquería here as well, called the Pulquería Hermosa Hortensia. While it is not a traditional pulquería, it is considered to be a safe place for tourists to try the native alcoholic drink of pulque.

Until 2009, this was the look the plaza had. The kiosk and arcade had witnessed thousands of declarations of love, where couples had mariachi bands serenade them. Others had come to celebrate special occasions, for nights out on the town or to forget about a lost love. Every year on 21 November, the Day of the Music has been celebrated here.

By 2009, the Plaza and the neighborhoods of Guerrero and Tlatelolco surrounding it had been in decline for decades. Infrastructure had not been maintained or updated, but the most serious deterioration for the area has been in the way of security. The area is well known for thieves, especially on the side streets, indigence and public drunkenness. This deterioration has caused many legitimate businesses to leave these neighborhoods and the number of tourists visiting the Plaza itself has greatly declined.

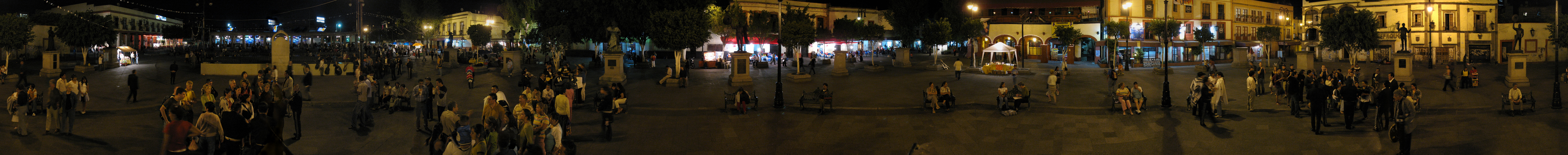
360° panoramic view of Plaza Garibaldi in the Historic Center of Mexico City. Mariachi bands are playing their music in front of different kinds of audiences. The photo shows the Plaza Garibaldi as it appeared until 2009. It has since been remodeled and no longer has the kiosk and other traditional street furniture.

== The newer plaza ==
=== Plan to revitalize Plaza Garibaldi ===
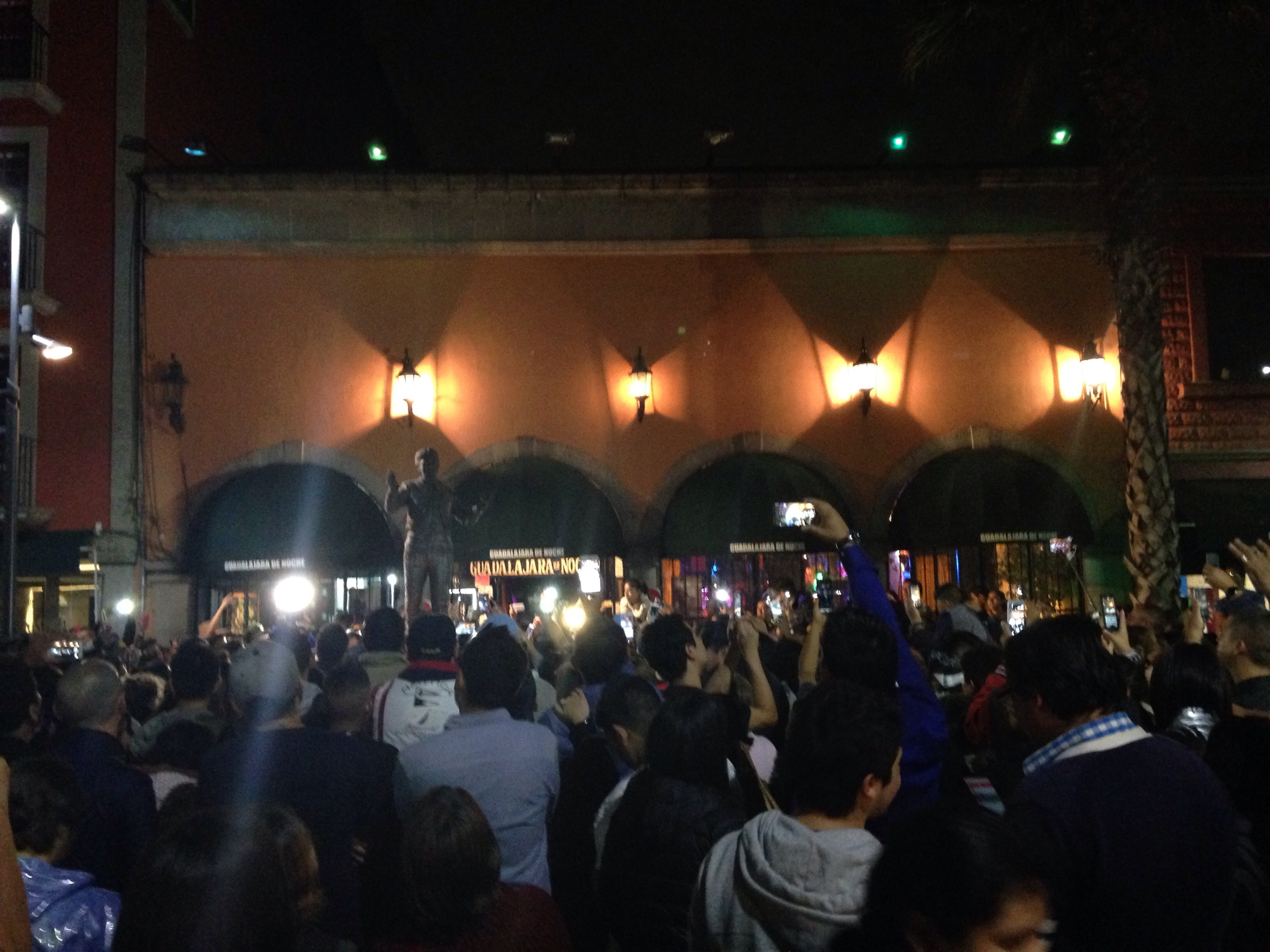
People congregated at Juan Gabriel sculpture paying tribute on the day of his death. Plaza Garibaldi, Mexico City.

In spite of the area's serious decline, Plaza Garibaldi remains one of the best-recognized places by foreign visitors in Mexico City. In 2007, a plan to rescue and revitalize Plaza Garibaldi and the surrounding neighborhoods, called the Programa Integral de Remodelación de la Plaza Garibaldi, was implemented. The plan is part of the ongoing effort to revitalize the historic downtown, and part of more ambitious plans to revitalize tourism in Zona Rosa and Xochimilco as well. The goal of the Garibaldi project is to recuperate one of the most “emblematic” or “iconic” places, and to restore it as one of the premier nightspots in Mexico City.

Financing for these projects was solicited from the Mexican federal government (50%), the Mexico City government, and private sources. The project involves fifteen local government agencies and two federal ones. Of the various revitalization projects relating to tourism in the city, the Garibaldi project has been considered the priority, as it is one of the most important attractions for the city, and was a site of Bicentennial Celebrations in Mexico City in 2010. Of the 120 million pesos budgeted for the various projects, 90.6 million is now destined for the Garibaldi area, because monies have been diverted from other projects.

Remodeling of the plaza itself was expected to cost 24 million pesos. 30 million pesos had been set aside to buy properties in the neighborhoods adjoining the Plaza, with the remodeling of these properties expected to cost 32.1 million. The entire project was scheduled to be completed in 2010.

=== Security ===
The first priority of the project has been to improve the security of the Plaza and the surrounding neighborhoods. A “security zone” between La Lagunilla (just east of Plaza Garibaldi), extending west and south to the Palacio de Bellas Artes, has been created so that the area can be visited 24 hours a day. This area is called the Bellas Artes-Garibaldi Tourism Corridor. Street lighting is being improved along with the rehabilitation of the gardens and sidewalks of the neighboring streets.

More police are being stationed here and two permanent police modules, one on Eje Central and the other in the center of Plaza Garibaldi itself, are planned. Security cameras are being installed and traffic flow along Eje Central improved. To rid the area of indigents and drunks, social workers are being employed to lead people to shelters and/or to job training services as appropriate. When necessary, judicial intervention will occur, according to the city. It is hoped that these combined efforts will move “anti-social” elements to other parts of the city, allowing businesses and private investment to return. All property owners in the area are being required to invest, co-invest, sell their lands or risk expropriation.

However, as of May 2013, the area was considered rife with petty thieves and thugs. This impression was confirmed by the murder of Malcolm X's grandson, Malcolm Shabazz, in the early hours of May 9, 2013. Shabazz, 28, and a friend were visiting The Palace Club when an argument ensued after two bar staff said their bill was $1,200. Shabazz was beaten while his friend was threatened and stripped of his belongings. Shabazz was apparently the victim of a common scam: he and his friend were lured into a bar by a young woman, where they bought over-priced drinks, and when presented with an outrageous bill, chose to fight rather than pay.

=== Infrastructure ===
The old kiosk and arcade have been leveled, as well as some of the older buildings on the east side of the plaza, to create more open space. An agave garden will be the center of the new Plaza. Benches, better walkways, lighting and a tourism information booth will be added. However, most of the remodeling money is going towards the purchase and renovation of the buildings around the plaza, to make them better-suited to commercial and tourism purposes. The renovation extends to the facades of 32 buildings that face the plaza, as well as infrastructure projects such as water, drainage and cable burial. New pavement and sidewalks are being installed in the neighboring streets of Republica de Perú, San Camilito, Republica de Honduras, Monteros and Amargura. These streets will also get benches, trash receptacles, better lighting and garden spaces. The goal is to promote new private investment in the area, promoting it as a “Barrio Mágico del Distrito Federal” (Magical Neighborhood of Mexico City) and a Zona de Desarrollo Turístico Sustenable (Sustainable Tourism Development Zone).

Two showpieces of the project are the Museum of Tequila and Mezcal and a School of Mariachi dedicated to the formal training of mariachi musicians. The goal is to present a better image of the square and the culture it represents to foreign visitors.

=== Museum of Tequila and Mezcal ===
Located just behind the Agave Garden on the Plaza, the museum is a three-story building with clear glass walls, stone floors, and an area of 220 m2. The architect of the project is Adriana Sepúlveda Vildósola, who is sponsored by the Autoridad de Espacio Público of Mexico City. Offices and other spaces occupy most of the ground floor. The first floor is an open exhibition area and contains most of the museum’s exhibition space. The purpose of the museum is to show the drinks’ origins, production and wide variety, and their place in the history of Mexico and Mexican cuisine. The museum also contains a tasting room. The project has a budget of 30 million pesos.

The top floor of the museum building is home to a bar with a small performing area, where seasoned solo mariachi singers perform well known Mexican folk songs. The mostly Mexican audiences often sing along with the performers. Although open to the public, it has a genial and inclusive atmosphere.

=== School of Mariachi ===
The School of Mariachi, like its predecessor, the School of Mexican Music, which was housed in an old silk factory nearby, trains mariachi musicians with an eye toward keeping the old traditional ways. Many mariachi purists complain that the music has been over-adapted to modern tastes and that many “pirate musicians,” who do not devote themselves to the music full-time, are ruining one of Mexico’s treasured icons. Many also worry that the music’s popularity in other places in the world, especially in the United States, is bringing unwanted changes to the genre. The School of Mariachi will get a new home in the new Plaza, and will also certify professional mariachi musicians from Mexico and around the world. The School of Mariachi has a budget of 32.1 million pesos.

=== Other attractions ===
The statues of Mexican music greats such as Pedro Infante, Jorge Negrete, Javier Solís and others are being moved to Republica de Honduras Street. This street will be closed to vehicular traffic and be converted into the Paseo de los Idolos de la Música Mexicana (Boulevard of the Idols of Mexican Music). The San Camilitio Gastronomic Market will remain, but it will be extensively rehabilitated at a cost of 4.5 million pesos. To further gastronomic development here, the city has proposed a Conservatory of Mexican Cuisine. They are also working to get gourmet restaurants in other parts of the city to open here as well, promising to work to promote new restaurants that do open here.

A lienzo charro for charreada has also been planned for this section of the city, as it is tied to mariachi music.
