= The Tablet (Brooklyn) =

American newspaper

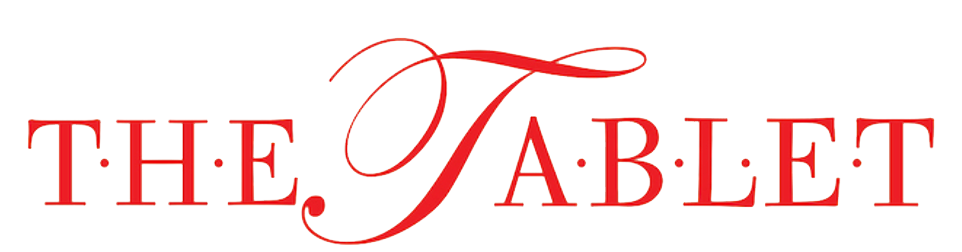
- Owner: DeSales Media Group (subsidiary of the Diocese of Brooklyn)
- Publisher: Bishop Robert Brennan
- Founded: 1908
- Language: English
- Headquarters: Brooklyn, New York, U.S.
- Sister newspapers: Nuestra Voz
- ISSN: 0039-8845
- Website: thetablet.org

The Tablet is a Catholic newspaper published in the interest of the Diocese of Brooklyn. It has circulated in Brooklyn and Queens, New York, since 1908. Its website serves the greater Catholic populace.

The Tablet is a property of DeSales Media Group, the communications and technology arm of the Diocese of Brooklyn, which also includes New Evangelization Television (NET-TV) and Nuestra Voz. The Tablet works with these DeSales outlets to produce cross-platform news coverage and has also established an editorial partnership with Crux, an independent online Catholic news outlet.

The Tablet distributes more than 55,000 copies per week through the mail and parish distribution in Brooklyn and Queens. Print copies of The Tablet reach all 50 states and 4 countries, and online readership averages more than 150,000 monthly users in 7 countries.

== Content ==
=== News ===
Although The Tablet focuses on local news about parishes, schools, neighborhoods, and sports, it also covers national and international news that is of interest to Catholic readers, including the Catholic Church's abuse crisis and the Pope's international trips.

=== Opinion ===
Each week, The Tablet publishes its editorial "As the Tablet Sees It." The paper also publishes "Sunday Scriptures" and "Up Front and Personal" columns, columns by guest writers, and nationally syndicated columns from George Weigel.

== Reputation ==
In more than a century of existence, The Tablet has gained a reputation as one of the best Catholic newspapers in the United States, winning hundreds of awards for editorial and advertising work in print and online.

In June 2018, The Tablet was named Newspaper of the Year by the Catholic Press Association in its category of diocesan newspapers with circulations above 25,000. In 1972, it won the Catholic Press Association Journalism Award for General Excellence.

In May 2018, longtime Editor-in-Chief Ed Wilkinson was awarded the St. Francis de Sales Distinguished Communicator Award at the Diocese of Brooklyn's 27th annual World Communications Day, Catholic Media Conference.

== History ==
In 1901, James Rooney of the Brooklyn Eagle made a proposal to Bishop Charles McDonnell for a diocesan paper, but the bishop wasn't ready. Seven years later, William P. Lawler, who published The Monitor for the Newark Archdiocese, made a similar proposal. By then, McDonnell was ready and suggested the paper's name, in honor of The London Tablet, the preeminent Catholic journal in the English-speaking world at the time.

The first issue of The Tablet appeared on April 4, 1908. Rev. James J. Coan was appointed editor and Joseph J. Timmes was appointed managing editor. In 1909, by the end of The Tablet's first year, its subscription base reached 13,000, and Bishop McDonnell purchased the paper. He saw The Tablet as an "influential means of spreading religious information and instruction and forming a link for the closer welding-together of the far-flung centers of Long Island."

In 1931, the paper's name was changed to Brooklyn Tablet, but it was changed back to The Tablet in 1939.

From 1933 to 1973, there was a separate Italian paper, Il Crociato.

In 1940, The Tablet Home Delivery Service begun.

In June 1972, The Tablet added a monthly Spanish supplement. A separate Spanish paper, El Nuevo Amanacer (The New Dawn), was published from 1981 to 1994. Manuel Gonzalez served as its first editor, followed by Sister Eve Gillcrist, O.P.

In December 1972, Ms. Tablet, an annual women's issue, made its first appearance. The paper featured women writers more prominently than it had previously, especially Sister Camille D'Arienzo, R.S.M.

From 1989 to 2007, Tablet Week in Review aired on The Prayer Channel.

In 2001, The Tablet launched its website, thetablet.org.

In October 2003, Bishop Nicholas DiMarzio's "Put Out Into the Deep" column first appeared. This was the first time in the paper's history that a diocesan bishop wrote a weekly column. Since then, Bishop DiMarzio has used his column as a way to speak directly to the people on local, national, and international issues.

On April 23, 2011, The Tablet published a Spanish-language insert, "La Reconciliación" (The Reconciliation), which went on to become The Tablet's Spanish-language sister publication, Nuestra Voz, which has become a monthly newspaper and daily digital news operation.
