= Pedro Pablo Oliva =

Cuban painter

Pedro Pablo Oliva Rodríguez
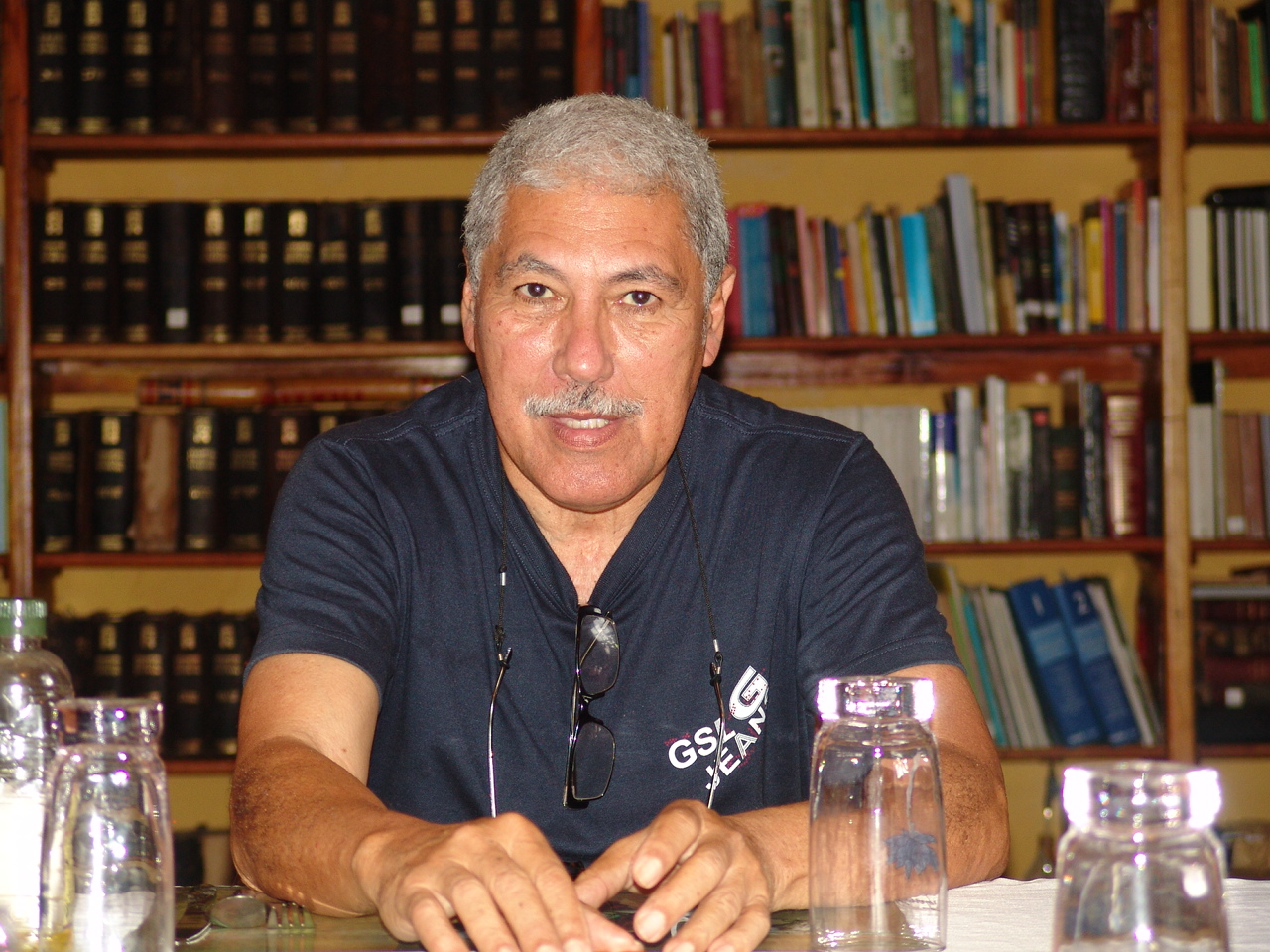
- Born: January 15, 1949 (age 77); Pinar del Río, Cuba
- Education: Provincial School of Plastic Arts, Pinar del Río; National School of Art of Cuba
- Alma mater: National School of Art of Cuba
- Known for: Painting
- Style: Neo-expressionism
- Awards: Distinction for National Culture (1987); Alejo Carpentier Medal (1994); FAO Medal of Honour (1997); National Prize of Plastic Arts (2006)
- Elected: Delegate to the National Assembly of People's Power (dismissed 2011)

Pedro Pablo Oliva Rodríguez (Pinar del Río, Cuba, January 15, 1949) is a Cuban painter.

== Early life ==
Oliva studied art from 1961 to 1964 in the Provincial School of Plastic Arts in Pinar del Río. He specialized in painting in the National School of Art of Cuba in Havana, where he graduated in 1970.

== Career ==
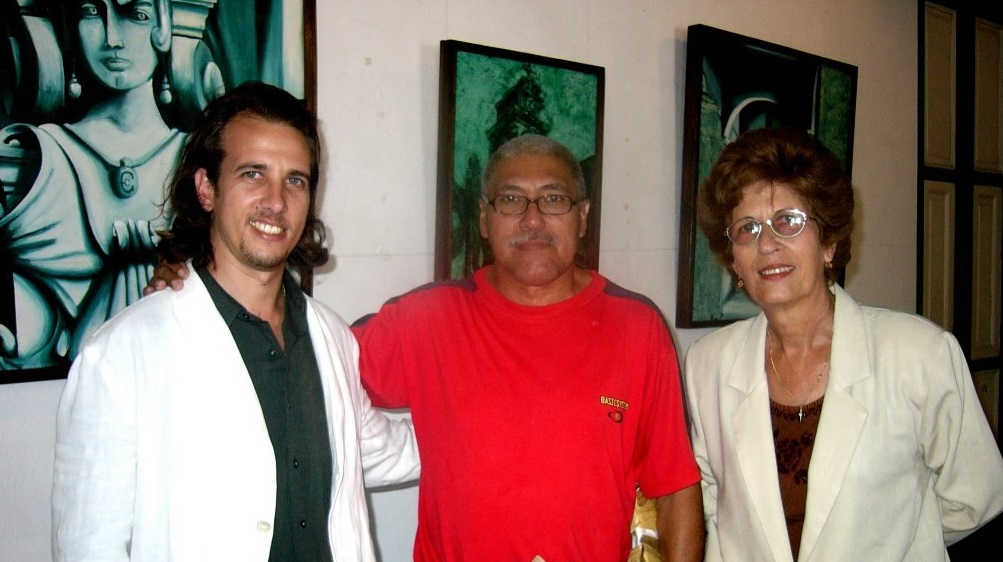
Pedro Pablo Oliva with Otto Alvarez and Mary Juana Ferro (October 2015)

Since 1974, Oliva's work has been presented at individual and collective exhibitions in Cuba as well as internationally. His works can be seen at the National Museum of Fine Arts of Havana and in collections in Canada, France, Italy, Spain, Brazil, Switzerland, Mexico, Germany and United States.

In 1998 Oliva founded and funded the Studio of Pedro Pablo Oliva in Pinar del Río, with the aim of promoting the art, literature and culture of his native province. He has been officially recognized by several institutions in Cuba.

Oliva belongs to the National Union of Writers and Artists of Cuba (UNEAC), the National Council and the International Association of Plastic Arts (AIAP). In 2011 he was dismissed by the Cuban government as a delegate to the National Assembly of People's Power in the province of Pinar del Río. The dismissal was motivated by the publication of a letter by Oliva that was critical of Cuba in the blog of the cyberactivist Yoani Sánchez, and by statements that he made to the journalist Edmundo García in his program La Tarde Se Mueve (The Afternoon Moves) on a television station in Miami.

== Style ==
Oliva's work is influenced by neoexpresionism, with a keen command of colour and a palette of intense chromatic diversity. His paintings often portray children, animals and fantastic figures.

== Recognition ==
Oliva has received national and international recognition and awards for his work, including:

- Distinction for National Culture, awarded by the Council of State of Cuba in 1987.
- Medal Alejo Carpentier, awarded by the Council of State of Cuba in 1994.
- Medal of the Members of Honour of the Food and Agriculture Organization of the United Nations (FAO), Rome, Italy, in 1997.
- National prize of Plastic Arts, awarded by the National Council of the Plastic Arts and the Ministry of Culture of Cuba in 2006.
