= Dolan Mor =

Cuban writer (born 1968)

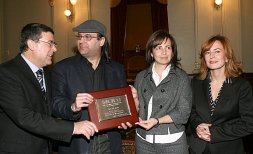
Dolan Mor.

Dolan Mor (born January 30, 1968, in Pinar del Río City, Cuba) is a Cuban writer. In most of his works, he plays with fictional art of poetry, with false authorships, change of identities, or the use of diverse heteronyms. To elaborate such postmodern art of poetry, he combines different literary styles in his books. He also adds pictures of writers (sometimes invented characters), or photocopies of apocryphal manuscripts and non-existent bibliographies. He was pupil of Joseba Sarrionandia, a mysterious writer and linguist of The Basque Country. Mor lives in Aragon, Spain since 1999.

== Works ==
- El plagio de Bosternag (2004)
- Las historias de Jonathan Cover (2005)
- Seda para tu cuello (2006)
- Nabokov's Butterflies (Premio de Poesia Delegación del Gobierno en Aragon [prize winner], 2007)
- Los poemas clonados de Anny Bould (Premio Internacional Miguel Labordeta de Poesía [prize winner], 2008)
- El libro bipolar (Premio Santa Isabel de Portugal [prize winner], 2009)
- La novia de Wittgenstein (Premio Internacional Barcarola de Poesía [prize winner], 2010)
- El idiota entre las hierbas (2010)
