= Filipino Cubans =

Cuban citizens of Philippine ancestry

cubanos filipinos (Spanish)

Regions with significant populations
- Havana · Santa Clara • Matanzas • Santiago de Cuba • Guantanamo Bay (mostly military and their families)

Languages
- Cuban Spanish

Religion
- Roman Catholicism

Related ethnic groups
- Overseas Filipinos

Filipino Cubans are Cubans of Filipino ancestry. Filipinos have been settling in Cuba since the 16th century and they are one of the earliest Asian communities in the country.

== History of migration ==
Filipinos and other Asian workers reached Cuba by sailing in the Manila-Acapulco galleons that crossed the Pacific Ocean regularly from the late 16th century until 1815. Manila was the jump-off point for all Spanish trade coming from East Asia, while Havana was the take-off point for Spanish trading ships sailing from Latin America to Spain. Most of the Asians who landed in Cuba went on to work in "Nueva Filipinas" (New Philippines) which is now Pinar del Río.

Most Filipinos who were brought by the Spaniards to Cuba worked in the tobacco plantations while there were others who were altar boys, catechism leaders, and church workers. Pinar del Río is famous for their cigars, which were brought over from the Philippines by the Spanish because it was much closer to Europe and easier to oversee. Afterwards, some Filipinos moved to Havana's big Barrio Chino or Chinatown. Others jumped ship to Louisiana. Others also sailed back to Sinaloa and Jalisco in Mexico. Those with money went to Spain or back to Manila (and brought with them the "Escabeche a la Cubana" which is a favorite dish to all Filipinos which they almost always serve using fish). The rest intermarried with the Cuban population.

Over time, the Filipinos who stayed quickly lost their ties to the Philippines since many among the Filipinos were like the local Cubans. They can speak Spanish, they were Catholic, they have to pay taxes or tributos, and they were treated like slaves by their Spanish masters. Nonetheless, their children survive to this day. Filipino Cubans were generally called “Chinos Manila," as Manila was very famous among the Cuban population at that time.

== Notable people ==
Important Filipino Cubans include the Azcárraga Fessner family, whose patriarch was Marcelo de Azcarraga y Palmero, the first Prime Minister of Spain to be of Filipino descent, whose mother was a Filipina from the Lizárraga and Palmero-Verzosa families.

== Guantanamo Bay ==
There are Filipinos and American people of Filipino descent on Guantanamo Naval Base in eastern Cuba.

== See also ==
- Cuba–Philippines relations
- Asian Latin Americans
- Asian Hispanic and Latino Americans
- Filipino immigration to Mexico
