= Nuestra Voz =

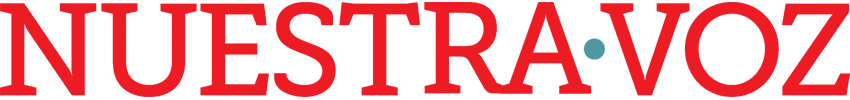
- Format: Compact
- Owner: DeSales Media Group (serving the people of Diocese of Brooklyn)
- Editor: Jorge I. Domínguez-López
- Founded: 2011
- Language: Spanish
- Headquarters: Brooklyn, New York
- Sister newspapers: The Tablet
- OCLC number: 915801308
- Website: nuestra-voz.org

Nuestra Voz (sometimes abbreviated as NV) is a Catholic Spanish-language monthly newspaper based in Brooklyn, New York published by DeSales Media Group. Its first issue was published on September 3, 2011. Nuestra Voz also runs a daily digital news operation. Since May 2015, Jorge I. Domínguez-López has been the Editor in Chief.

The mission of Nuestra Voz is to evangelize by delivering religious information, analysis, and news of interest to Hispanic Catholics. Its goal is to assist and empower the diverse Hispanic community by highlighting the multiple resources available to them within the Catholic Church and all the religious events they can enjoy in the diocese.

== History ==
In the late 1970s, The Tablet had a pullout called “Suplemento en Español.” There was a steady audience for it, so it evolved into a freestanding publication called Nuevo Amanecer which lasted into the 1990s.

On April 23, 2011, an early version of Nuestra Voz was published as an insert in its sister English language publication The Tablet, under the title ‘La Reconciliación’ (The Reconciliation). Five months later, in September 2011, Nuestra Voz was launched and has been published uninterrupted since then.

Originally, the website associated with the newspaper was www.netspanol.net. By September 2013, the website URL was changed to nuestra-voz.org.

The paper's motto, “Your faith in your language (Tú fe en tu idioma),” appeared on the front page under the nameplate until the newspaper underwent a major redesign of layout and sections in November 2016 in the issue Year VI, No. 3.

== Content ==
Nuestra Voz is a Catholic-driven journalism force created to showcase its community. Because the Diocese of Brooklyn is half Hispanic and one-fourth multilingual, its mission is to do more to inform and empower.

=== News ===
Nuestra Voz addresses contemporary issues affecting Hispanic Catholics in the diocese and beyond, including local and national news, politics, health, immigration, family and religion.

=== Opinion ===
Nuestra Voz includes “Columna del editor” (Editor's Column) written by Jorge Dominguez-Lopez, “Remar mar adentro” (A translation of The Tablet's “Put Out Into The Deep”) written by the bishop of the Diocese of Brooklyn, Bishop Nicholas DiMarzio, “En la diócesis” (In the Diocese) written by multiple writers which contains stories about events happening in the Hispanic community of the diocese, “Comunidad Religiosa” (Religious Community) written by Darío López-Capera which features a different protest or religious sister every month, “Derecho y Vida” (Rights and Life) written by Monsignor Jonas Achacoso which features straight answers about the Catholic perspective to questions and problems Catholics face in their daily lives, and “Humor” written by the contemporary Cuban humor writer Enrique Del Risco, or "Enrisco," which is a funny yet deep reflection about social and political issues affecting the Hispanic community.

=== Audience ===
Nuestra Voz distributes 18,000 copies monthly. Online, Nuestra Voz gets 46,000 unique visitors monthly.

== Organization ==
Nuestra Voz is owned by DeSales Media, serving the people of the Diocese of Brooklyn. DeSales Media has responded to the changing face of the diocese by reaching a new audience of Latinos with the information they can use for the betterment of their communities and their Catholic faith.

Bishop Nicholas DiMarzio, the seventh bishop of the Diocese of Brooklyn and Queens, is the founder and current publisher of Nuestra Voz.

Monsignor Kieran Harrington, the Vicar for Communications for the Diocese of Brooklyn and president and chairman of DeSales Media Group, is the founding and current Associated Publisher.

== Editors ==
- Nathalia Ortiz (Editor, Sept. 2011 - Sept. 2012)
- Daniel Arias Álvarez (Editor, Oct. 2012 - Dec. 2014)
- Darío López Capera (Interim Editor, Jan. 2015 - June 2015)
- Jorge I. Domínguez-López (Editor-in-chief, July 2015 – present)

== Awards ==
The paper has won more than 60 Catholic Press Association (CPA) Awards in 2018, including ‘Editor of the Year,’ ‘Videographer/Video Producer of the Year,’ ‘Spanish Staff Writer of the Year,’ ‘Best News Writing: National/International Event,’ ‘Best Editorial Page,’ ‘Best Coverage of Pro-Life Issues,’ ‘Best Interview,’ ‘Best Essay Reflecting on Faith Formation,’ and Second place ‘Publication of the Year (Spanish) in 2016.

On Friday, June 21, at the Catholic Press Association of the United States and Canada Catholic 2019 Media Conference and CPA Press Awards, that took place in St. Petersburg, Florida, Nuestra Voz was honored with the Spanish Publication of the Year Award.

At the 2021 Virtual Catholic Media Conference, June 8–10, 2021, the newspaper received the Spanish Publication of the Year award for the second time. Nuestra Voz won a record of 38 prizes and nine first places.
