= Dagoberto Valdés Hernández =

Dagoberto Valdéz Hernández
- Born: August 4, 1955 (age 70); Pinar del Río, Cuba

Dagoberto Valdés Hernández (born August 4, 1955) is a Cuban Catholic intellectual and editor. He is the founder of Vitral and Convivencia magazines.

== Early life ==
Dagoberto Valdés Hernández was born on August 4, 1955, in Pinar del Río, Cuba. In 1974, when he graduated from Senior High School, he intended to study sociology but he was denied access to this career due to religious belief restrictions. At that time believers in God were allowed to study only scientific or technical careers in Cuba. He graduated from agronomic engineering at the University of Pinar del Río in 1980. He taught as a guest professor at that university, and he was part of a group of research on agricultural mechanization.

For 16 years he worked in the Tobacco Enterprise in Pinar del Río, and he was the president of its Advising Technical Board during five years. On May 2, 1996, he was expelled from his job because he was the editor-in-chief of the Catholic magazine VITRAL. He was sent to work in the field as a member of a squad that used to pick "yaguas" (the scabbard of the palm tree leaves which is used to pack tobacco). He was punished to work there for 10 years and a month.

On June 2, 2006 he was transferred back to the same Tobacco Enterprise in Pinar del Río as engineer, to control the quality of tobacco. In October of that year, he was appointed again to be the president of the Advising Technical Board in the Enterprise. But in February 2007 he resigned from his job because he was receiving a different and discriminatory treatment compared to the rest of engineers and workers.

== Church activities ==
He was a member of the Presidency of the Cuban Ecclesial National Gathering (ENEC) (Catholic National Congress) in 1986. He drew up the Chapter Faith and Culture of the Congress Final Document. He was appointed to say, on behalf of the Church in Cuba, the "Words of Praise to Father Félix Varela", at the "Aula Magna" of the University of Havana.

He was founder and first diocesan Responsible for ten years (1977–1987) at the Movement of Laic Ministers of the Word in Pinar del Río. He was also the founder and President of the Catholic Commission for Culture in Pinar del Río Diocese since 1987 until 2006.

He participated in the 25th World Congress of the International Movement of Catholic Intellectuals (MIIC-Pax Romana) held in Rome in September 1987. He was granted an audience by the Pope John Paul II with whom he met four times. He is the founder and Director of the Civic and Religious Education Center (CFCR) since 1993 and the editor of its magazine Vitral since 1994 until 2007 when the center and the magazine were seized.

He has been organizer of the Catholic Social Weeks in Cuba since 1991 until the last one in 2005. He has been invited to be a lecturer in these events. He was the sponsor of the restoration of those academic events on the Church Social Doctrine after the socialist Revolution in 1959 in his country. For this reason he was appointed to participate in the 1st. World Gathering of Catholic Social Week Representatives convened by the Justice and Peace Pontifical Council, held in Rome in 1995.

In 1998 he participated in the preparations for the visit paid by the Pope John Paul II to Cuba. He received a Bible from the Pope’s hands, in recognition of his work, during the Mass held in the José Martí Square, as well as other 19 prominent laics from all over Cuba did. He was also invited to the Gathering of the Pope with Cuban Culture personalities held at the "Aula Magna" of the University of Havana by virtue of his responsibility as Executive Secretary of the National Commission for Culture of the Cuban Catholic Bishop Conference.

== Accomplishments ==
He received from the hands of the queen and king Willem-Alexander of the Netherlands the Prince Claus Award for Culture and Development which was bestowed upon Vitral Magazine during a ceremony on December 8, 1999 in the Amsterdam Royal Palace. He was one of the founders and a member of the Executive Secretariat of the Press Catholic Union of Cuba (UCLAP) since 1995 until 2001.

In 1999 he was appointed by the Pope John Paul II full member of the Justice and Peace Pontifical Council of the Holy See, until November 2005; and member of the Executive Secretariat of the Justice and Peace National Commission of Cuba since 2001 until 2006. He was received by the ex-President Jimmy Carter and his Staff from the "Carter" Center on May 16, 2002 for a work breakfast in La Moka Motel in Pinar del Río.

During the autumn of 2004 he visited the Czech Republic and Slovakia as a guest of Cardinal Miloslav Vlk of Prague. On November 1, 2004 he was received by the ex-president Václav Havel in Prague. On November 3, 2004 he had a meeting with the Vice Minister of Foreign Affairs of Slovakia and other personalities. He received the Jan Karski Award, to Courage and Compassion on November 10, 2004 in Washington, D.C.

Through his editorials, he wrote about civic engagement, public participation, and maintaining hope in difficult circumstances. He was associated with a civic center and a magazine that circulated nationally and published material critical of the government.

== Teaching accomplishments ==
He has been a guest lecturer in Georgetown University and the Catholic University of America. He was appointed first vice president of the Institute of Cuban Studies (IEC) in 2005. In April 2007, he became president of the IEC, which is made up of outstanding intellectuals from the island and the Diaspora. He is the first Cuban living in the island who holds this post.

He worked as a professor of Ethics, Civics and Introduction to Ecclesiology, at the diocesan Pre-Seminary "Fr. Félix Varela" from 1996 to 2007. From 1993 to 2007 he taught as a professor of Ethics and Civics. His writings deal with the topic he developed and investigated most: the Civil society in Cuba.

== Writing accomplishments ==
He was a permanent correspondent for the Italian Magazine La Societá and a permanent columnist in La Voz Católica, a publication of the Miami Archdiocese in Florida, U.S.

On December 20, 2007 he received the Tolerancia Plus Award granted by some groups of the Cuban Civil society. This is the first award he receives inside Cuba.

In January 2008 he founded the Socio Cultural digital Magazine Convivencia. Its first issue appeared on February 15, 2008.

== Published work ==
- Félix Varela: Biografía del Padre de la Cultura Cubana published by the Pinar del Río Bishopric in two editions, one of them in 2006 with eight thousand copies.
- Somos Trabajadores. University of Latin American Workers . UTAL. Venezuela 1995
- Reconstruir la sociedad civil, un proyecto para Cuba. Conrad Adenauer Foundation. Published in its Venezuelan affiliate company in 1997. Translated into English in 2008
- Cuba: Libertad y Responsabilidad. Desafíos y Proyectos. Universal Publishing House in the United States, 2005
- La libertad de la luz, a compilation of editorials from Vitral Magazine (1994–2007). Lech Walesa Institute, May 2007. This Institute has published the second edition in Spanish in 2009
- Cuba: Time to improve. Hispanic Cuban Publishing House. Madrid Spain. May 2009
