= The Loser List (series) =

- The Loser List; The Loser List: Revenge of the Loser
- Author: Holly Kowitt
- Illustrator: Holly Kowitt
- Cover artist: Holly Kowitt
- Country: United States
- Language: English
- Genre: Realistic fiction
- Publisher: Scholastic Publishing
- Published: April 4, 2011 – 2013
- No. of books: 4

The Loser List is a series of fiction books by Holly Kowitt. The main character is Danny Shine.

== Books ==
- The Loser List (April 4, 2011) ISBN 978-0-545-24004-8. In this book, Danny Shine finds out he is on the Loser List in the girls' washroom. He wants to erase it, which lands him in detention. Danny Shine turns from a good kid to a meanie bad boy. He supplies things like tattoos and graffiti.
- The Loser List: Revenge of the Loser (May 1, 2012) Danny's life is okay, and he is off the loser list. But when a new kid, Ty, comes, everything takes a turn for the worse. Ty is popular and a total environment supporter, and all the girls love it/him. Danny tries to ruin him by showing Ty's terrible rapping talent, but ends up getting cold shoulder and telling the truth. From there, things go up a little.
- The Loser List : Jinx of the Loser Danny Shine doesn't care about his school's baseball team, the Woodchucks. But he's kind of having fun sitting right behind third base at the big game. He even catches a foul ball—but that means the Woodchuck third baseman doesn't catch it, and the team loses. Suddenly, Danny finds himself back at Square One: Loserville.
- The Loser List: Take Me To Your Loser Danny's gotten REVENGE and broken his JINX. He might finally shed his LOSER status once and for all ... but where would be the hilarity in that?
