= Tania Marmolejo =

American painter

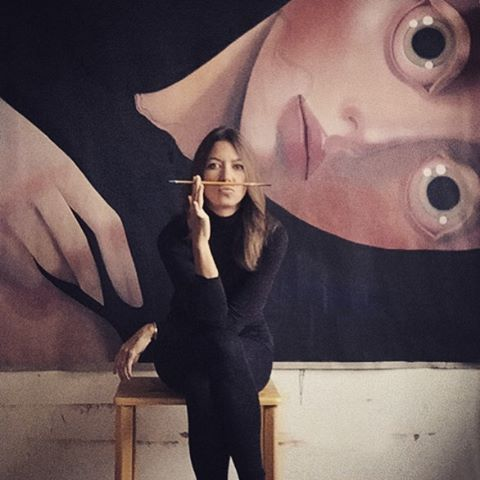
- The artist and 'The Light Suggestion' (50 x 66 inches, oil on linen), 2015
- Born: 5 September 1975 (age 50); Santo Domingo, Dominican Republic

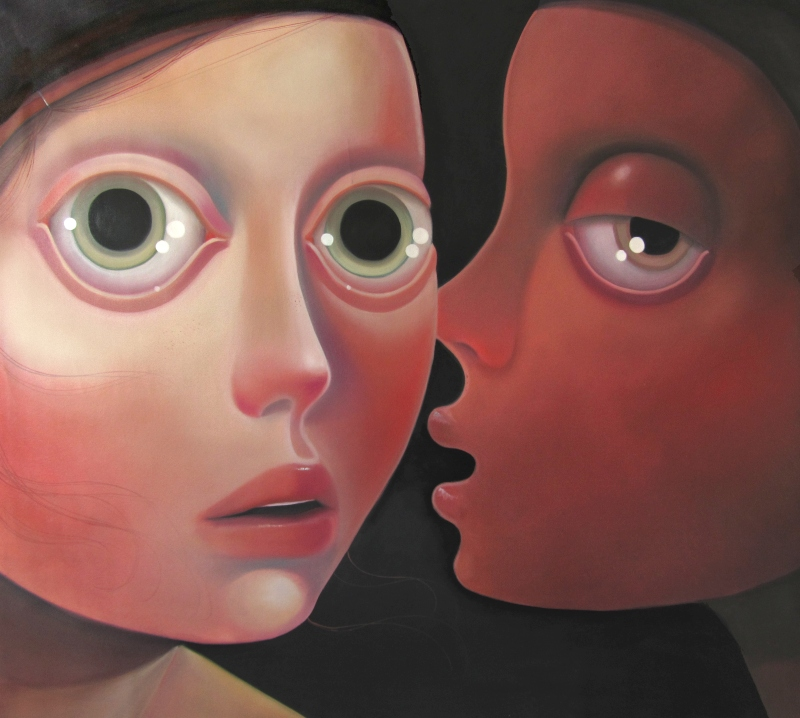

Tania Marmolejo (born September 5, 1975) is a Dominican born, Dominican Swedish American painter. Tania is a mix of Scandinavia and the Caribbean - she was born to a Swedish mother and her father was an engineer at Falconbridge Dominicana, in the Cibao region of the Dominican Republic

After studying Graphic Design and Illustration in the cities of Harstad and Kristiansand, Norway, Marmolejo graduated from Fine Arts and Illustration at the Altos De Chavon School of Design, Dominican Republic, 1998. She received the Charles Bludhorn Scholarship to continue studies at Parsons The New School for Design, in New York City, from where she graduated in 2000.

Tania Marmolejo currently lives in New York, where she works as an artist and designer.

== Selected Awards, fellowships, recognitions ==
- 2014 Selection, BID 2014, Madrid, Spain
- 2010 New York State Assembly Honor
- 2001 CINE Award I DMA Animation Studios. 'Freedom River' Hyperion/Disney. New York, NYC
- 2001 ASIFA Award I DMA Animation Studios. 'Freedom River' Hyperion/Disney. New York, NYC
- 1998 Bludhorn Scholarship

== Selected Individual exhibitions ==
- 2023 The Nurturing Wild, Kutlesa, Goldau, Switzerland
- 2023 What Was Saved from the Fire, Loyal Gallery, Stockholm, Sweden
- 2023 Under the Influence, Villazan Gallery, Madrid, Spain
- 2023 Alter Egos, Eligere Gallery, Seoul, South Korea
- 2022 Master and Commander, Volery Gallery, Dubai International Financial Center, United Arab Emirates
- 2022 The Dream and The Voyage, Centre of International Contemporary Art (CICA), Vancouver, Canada
- 2022 As Far As Your Eyes Can See, Sept. Eligere Gallery, solo showcase at Kiaf PLUS, South Korea
- 2022 Telenovela Life, GR Gallery, New York
- 2021 Untamed Truths, Lyle O. Reitzel Contemporary Art, Dominican Republic
- 2021 Anacaonas Revange, Eligere Gallery, Seoul, South Korea
- 2020 Santas y Tígueras, Museum Candido Bido, Dominican Republic
- 2018 (In Between), Galleri Nord-Norge, Harstad, Norway
- 2018 Here Versus There, Lyle O Reitzel Gallery, New York, NY
- 2015 What was I thinking?, Lyle O. Reitzel Gallery, Dominican Republic
- 2013 Delicious Torment, Lyle O. Reitzel Gallery, Dominican Republic
- 2012 The Awakening, Deborah Colton Gallery, Houston, Texas
- 2011 Toxic Longings, Sensei at Panda Gallery, New York, NY

== Selected collective exhibitions ==
- 2022 Power of Femininity, Kutlesa, Goldau, Switzerland
- 2014 Ibero American Biennial of Design (BID 2014), Matadero, Madrid, Spain
- 2012 InContext, ArtMiami, Lyle O. Reitzel Gallery Booth, Miami, FL
- 2012 Extraordinay 5, Cafeina Wynwood Art Center, Miami, FL
- 2011 Hyperboreans, Dacia Gallery, New York, NY
- 2011 Enigmatic Visions, William Bennet Gallery, Soho, New York
- 2015 MoCCA I NY Arts Festival, New York
- 2011 PINTA Art Fair, Lyle O. Reitzel Gallery, New York
- 2010 Hybrids, Queens Museum of Art, New York
- 2009 XVII Ibero American Art Salon, Katzen Art Center, Washington DC
- 2006 'The Vagina Monologues', Columbia Presbyterian, New York

== Books ==
- I doodle therefore I am
- To doodle or not to doodle (a book of possibilities)

== Selected bibliography ==
- 2023 McCoole, Veena. "Tania Marmolejo's Wide-Eyed Portraits Are Capturing Collector's Attention". Artsy. May 31, 2023.
- 2015 De Tolentino, Marianne. "Tania Marmolejo piensa y pinta," Periódico Hoy, 3 Octubre, Dominican Republic
- 2015 Lugo, Diana. "Tania Marmolejo: el Secreto de las miradas", Estilos Magazine, Diario Libre, 12 September, Dominican Republic
- 2014 Blush Magazine, Anniversary Edition. Fashion Faces from Dominican Republic. September 2014. Pgs. 179-182. Interview
- 2014 Hughes, Rebecca. "Tania Marmolejo: Artist, Designer and All Around Renaissance Woman," Casa Life Magazine. Year 9, vol. 1.
- 2014 Badajoz, Joaquin. "Las nuevas poéticas de Tania Marmolejo, " El Nuevo Herald. Artes y Letras (cover). 24 August.
- 2012 MIAMI Magazine, Art Basel Edition. December 2012. Cover.
- 2011 Aguirregomezcorta, Gonzalo: “Tres artista, tres maneras de ilustrar independientes. Tania Marmolejo: el arte de “doodlear” de una dominicana residente en Nueva York,” El Mundo, Spain. (MoCCA festival)
