= Malin Alegria =

American author of Youth literature

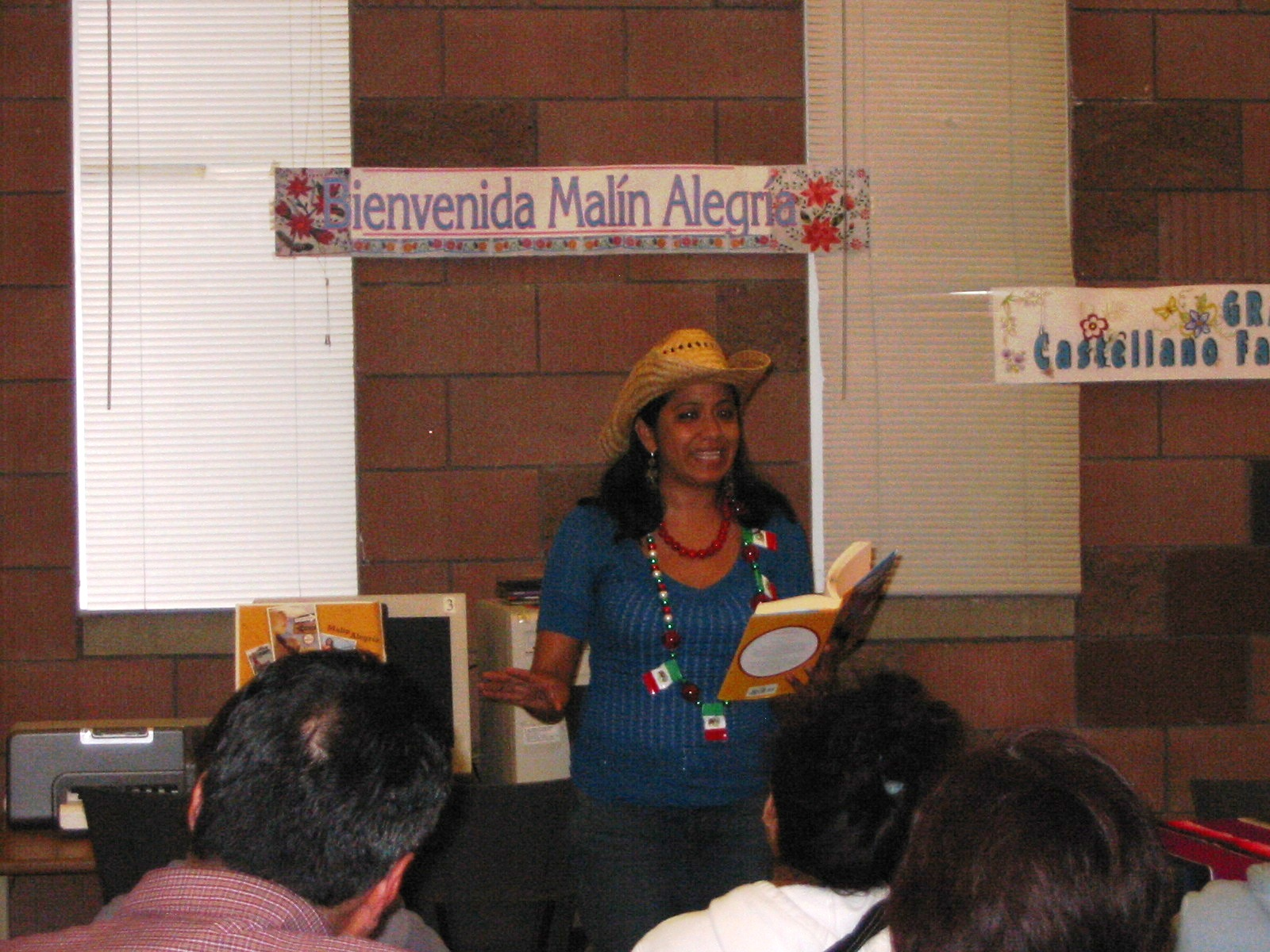
- Occupation: Novelist
- Writing career
- Genre: Young Adult Novels
- Website: www.malinalegria.com

Malin Alegria is an American author of Youth literature, who primarily focuses on the genre of young adult novels.

== Written work and topics ==
Her first book Estrella's Quinceañera deals with a girl's struggle between a traditional quinceañera and an American-style Sweet 16 birthday party. It is based in San Jose, California. Estrella's Quinceañera was published by Simon & Schuster in 2006.

It has been recommended by educators and librarians as a way of teaching tolerance and youth voices.

Alegria also wrote Sofi's Guide To Getting Lost in Mexico in which Sofi Mendoza goes to a party in TJ (Tijuana) to hook up with her biggest crush but finds out her green card is fake. Then she has to endure cooking, cleaning and a truck that smells like Chinese food.

Malin is currently at work on a teen book series for Scholastic, "Border Town", about a fictional town in South Texas.

Malin conducts readings across the United States.

== Bibliographical Resources ==
https://faculty.ucmerced.edu/mmartin-rodriguez/index_files/vhAlegriaMalin.htm

== Personal life ==
Malin Alegria currently resides in San Francisco California and Albuquerque, New Mexico.
