= Fran Marmolejo =

Spanish footballer (born 1988)

Personal information
- Full name: Francisco Marmolejo Mancilla
- Date of birth: 19 January 1988 (age 38)
- Place of birth: Coín, Spain
- Height: 1.82 m (6 ft 0 in)
- Position: Goalkeeper

Senior career*
| Years | Team | Apps | (Gls) |
| 2007–2011 | Málaga B | | |
| 2011–2012 | Écija | 6 | (0) |
| 2012–2015 | Marbella | 3 | (0) |
| 2015–2016 | El Palo | | |
| 2016–2017 | Jönköpings Södra | 5 | (0) |
| 2018 | Víkingur Ólafsvík | 22 | (0) |
| 2019 | Víkingur Reykjavik | 2 | (0) |
- * Club domestic league appearances and goals

Francisco Marmolejo Mancilla (born 19 January 1988) is a Spanish former professional footballer who played as a goalkeeper.

== Honours ==
Víkingur FC

- Icelandic Cup: 2019
