= Vitral =

Cuban magazine

Vitral was a magazine founded in Pinar del Río Province of Cuba.

== Origins of the name ==
Old Cuban constructions inherited from the Spaniards have multicolored or polychrome glass on their windows. In Spanish these are called in "Vitral". They resemble the stained glass windows of a church but on a smaller scale. The magazine's name was intended to symbolize the need for transparency and a plurality of ideas in Cuba. The Vitral was intended to act as a window for Cuba and the people of Cuba to see the outside world.

== History and profile ==
Vitral was established the Diocese of Pinar del Río in western Cuba in 1994. Dagoberto Valdés Hernández is the founder and Director of the Civic and Religious Education Center (CFCR) since 1993 and was the editor of its magazine, Vitral from 1994 to 2007 when the center and the magazine were seized.

In 1998, Vitral won the Principal Prince Claus Award, along with Fellag and Al Jazeera.

On April 12, 2007, the magazine announced it would close due to lack of funds.

As defined on its website, "VITRAL was a Cuban socio-cultural Catholic magazine. A space for transparency and reflection in the pluralism and multicolor light the Civic and Religious Education Center offers, in the Pinar del Río Diocese". This magazine publishes articles about Cuba by Cubans independent from the government. Some of the articles published are critical of the Cuban government.
