= Cirilo Marmolejo =

Mexican musician

- Born: Teocaltiche, Jalisco, Mexico
- Died: Mexico City, Mexico

Cirilo Marmolejo (1890–1960) was a Mexican folk musician of guitarrón and vihuela, and pioneer in the development of the mariachi band.

Marmolejo was born in Teocaltiche. In 1918 he was invited to play at Guadalajara city, and then at Mexico City. From that time, the popularization of this type of band spread in the country. The Mariachi Coculense of Marmolejo was the first mariachi to tour and record in the United States, and to add a trumpet to the ensemble.
