= Catholic Media Association =

The Catholic Media Association, formerly the Catholic Press Association of the United States and Canada, is an association of American and Canadian newspaper and media specialists specialized on reporting on the Catholic Church. Founded in 1911, it has over 600 member organizations and reaches over 26 million people.

Its stated purpose is to assist its members to serve effectively, through the medium of the printed word and electronic media, the social, intellectual and spiritual needs of the entire human family, and to spread and support the Kingdom of God.

The organization administers an annual book awards program.

== Regions ==
In 2010, the CMA had four regions: Eastern, Southern, Midwestern, and Western.

== See also ==
- Catholicism in Canada
- Catholicism in the United States
- Catholic Church and politics in the United States
- History of Catholicism in the United States
