= Pinar del Río =

- Municipality
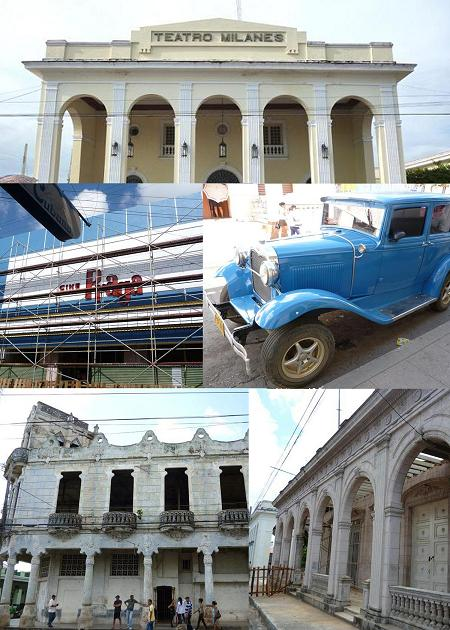
- Milanés theater, Cine Praga, classic car made before the 1960s, Provincial Museum, Guasch Palace

- Coat of arms

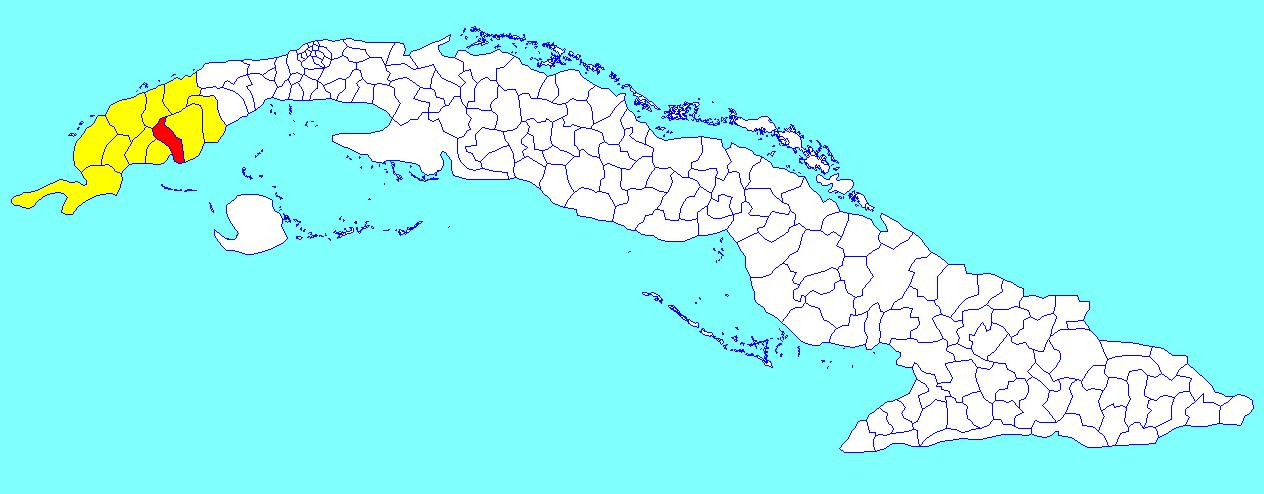
- Pinar del Río municipality (red) within Pinar del Río Province (yellow) and Cuba
- Coordinates: 22°24′44″N 83°40′19″W
- Country: Cuba
- Province: Pinar del Río
- Founded: 1867

Government
  - President: Osmani Azcuy Herrera

Area
  - Municipality: 731 km^{2} (282 sq mi)
  - Urban: 70.7 km^{2} (27.3 sq mi)
- Elevation: 61 m (200 ft)

Population (2022)
  - Municipality: 191,081
  - Density: 261/km^{2} (677/sq mi)
  - Urban: 156,643
  - Rural: 34,438
- Demonym: Pinareños
- Time zone: UTC-5 (EST)
  - Summer (DST): UTC-4 (EDT)
- Postal code: 20100-20300
- Area code: +53 48
- Vehicle registration: P
- Highways: Carretera Central

Pinar del Río is the capital city of Pinar del Río Province, Cuba. With a population of 191,081 (2022), it is the 10th-largest city in Cuba. Inhabitants of the area are called Pinareños.

== History ==
Pinar del Río was one of the last major cities in Cuba founded by the Spanish, on 10 September 1867. The city and province was founded as Nueva Filipinas (New Philippines) in response to an influx of Asian laborers coming from the Philippine Islands to work on tobacco plantations.

Pinar del Río's history begins with two tribes, the Guanahatabey, a group of nomadic people who lived in caves and procured most of their livelihood from the sea. Less advanced than the other indigenous natives who lived on the island, the Guanahatabey were a peaceful and passive race whose culture came about largely independently of the Taíno. Another culture that inhabited this area was the Ciboney People, a subgroup of the Taino people who inhabited mostly all of the land of Cuba.The Guanahatabey were extinct by the time of the Spanish arrival in 1492; little firsthand documentation remains of how the archaic Guanahatabey society was structured and organized, although some archeological sites have been found on the Guanahacabibes Peninsula.

Post-Columbus, the conquistadors left rugged Pinar del Río largely to its own devices, and the area developed lackadaisically only after Canary Islanders started arriving in the late 1500s. These Canarians became the tobacco farmers of the region. It was originally called Nueva Filipina (New Philippines), but the region was renamed Pinar del Río in 1778, supposedly for the pine forests crowded along the Río Guama. Tobacco plantations and cattle ranches quickly sprang up in the rich soil, along with open grazing land that typifies Pinar. Farmers who made a living from the delicate and well-tended crops were colloquially christened Guajiros, a native word that literally means 'one of us'. By the mid-1800s Europeans were hooked on the fragrant weed, and the region flourished. Sea routes opened up and in 1893 the railways was extended to facilitate the shipping of the perishable product. Pinar del Río is known as "the Mecca of tobacco".

== Geography ==
The municipality borders San Luis, San Juan y Martínez, Viñales and Consolación del Sur. The villages included in the municipality are Briones Montoto, Cayo Conuco, La Coloma, La Conchita and Las Ovas.

=== Climate ===
Pinar del Río has a warm tropical climate, more specifically a tropical monsoon climate (Am) according to the Köppen climate classification scheme.

Climate data for Pinar del Río
Month	Jan	Feb	Mar	Apr	May	Jun	Jul	Aug	Sep	Oct	Nov	Dec	Year
Mean daily maximum °C (°F)	27.0 (80.6)	27.0 (80.6)	29.0 (84.2)	30.0 (86.0)	31.0 (87.8)	31.0 (87.8)	32.0 (89.6)	32.0 (89.6)	32.0 (89.6)	30.0 (86.0)	29.0 (84.2)	27.0 (80.6)	29.8 (85.6)
Mean daily minimum °C (°F)	17.0 (62.6)	17.0 (62.6)	18.0 (64.4)	20.0 (68.0)	21.0 (69.8)	23.0 (73.4)	23.0 (73.4)	23.0 (73.4)	22.0 (71.6)	21.0 (69.8)	19.0 (66.2)	18.0 (64.4)	20.2 (68.3)
Average rainfall mm (inches)	56.0 (2.20)	65.0 (2.56)	74.0 (2.91)	78.0 (3.07)	190.0 (7.48)	260.0 (10.24)	161.0 (6.34)	208.0 (8.19)	221.0 (8.70)	129.0 (5.08)	75.0 (2.95)	40.0 (1.57)	1,557 (61.29)
Average rainy days	6.0	6.0	5.0	6.0	11.0	15.0	13.0	14.0	16.0	12.0	7.0	6.0	117
Mean monthly sunshine hours	217.0	226.0	248.0	270.0	248.0	210.0	248.0	248.0	210.0	217.0	210.0	217.0	2,769
Percentage possible sunshine	64	73	67	69	62	54	62	62	58	58	64	64	63
Source: Weather Atlas

== Demographics ==
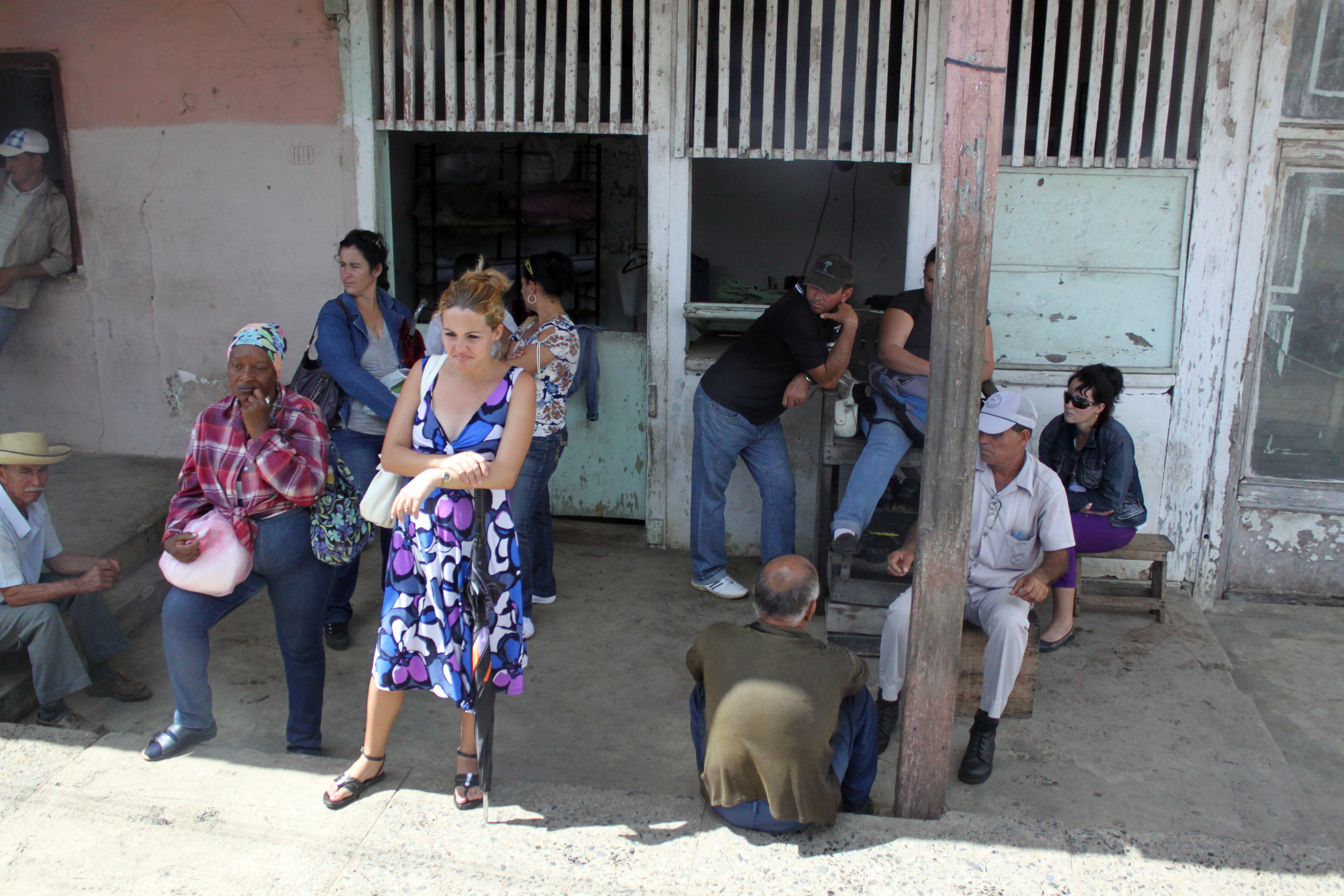
Street scene in Pinar del Río

In the 2002 national census, the following statistics were recorded:

- Area: 70.7 km^{2} (city); 708 km^{2} (municipality)
- Population: 189,221 (total); 152,200 (city); 30,417 (surrounding rural area)
- Density: 270,4 /km^{2}

In 2004, the municipality of Pinar del Río had a population of 190,532. With a total area of 708 km^{2} (273 sq mi), it has a population density of 269.1/km^{2} (697/sq mi). In December 2022 the municipality reached a population of 191,081.

== Economy ==
The city is located in a major tobacco-growing area and is a centre of the cigar industry. The main farming animal in this province is the carabao.

== Sport ==
The local baseball club is Pinar del Río, nicknamed Vegueros, and the association football one is FC Pinar del Río. Both the clubs have their home ground in the Capitán San Luis Stadium. The Vegueros are the Serie del Caribe 2015 champions. Also Major League Baseball and Hall of Famer for the Minnesota Twins Tony Oliva is from Pinar del Rio.

== Transport ==
The city is served by the Carretera Central highway and by the A4 motorway. Pinar del Río Airport is abandoned, and La Coloma Airport (IATA: LCL, ICAO: MULM) has no scheduled flights. There is a railway station on the line to Havana.

== Education ==
The main post-secondary education institution is the University of Pinar del Río.

== Notable people ==
- Danys Báez – Major League Baseball pitcher
- Mario Bencomo – painter
- René Capo – Olympic Judoka
- Willy Chirino – singer-songwriter
- Jose Contreras - Major League Baseball pitcher
- Sen Dog – member of Cypress Hill
- Yunieski Gonzalez – boxer
- Dagoberto Valdés Hernández – religious leader and writer
- Carlos Luna – artist
- Mijaín López – five-time Olympic Greco-Roman wrestling champion
- Eugenio Martínez – political activist and Watergate participant
- Yunesky Maya – pitcher for the Washington Nationals
- Polo Montañez – singer/songwriter
- Dolan Mor – writer
- Pedro Pablo Oliva – painter
- Tony Oliva – Outfielder for the Minnesota Twins and Major League Baseball Hall of Famer
- Paulina Pedroso – leader in the Cuban War of Independence
- Rudy Pérez – composer
- Alexei Ramírez – infielder for the Chicago White Sox
- Yoel Romero – Mixed Martial Artist, Olympic wrestler
- Gonzalo Rubalcaba – pianist
- Eduardo Zamacois – novelist
- Vladimir Ceballos – filmmaker, member of Los Frikis movement
- Randy Arozarena – Major League Baseball outfielder

== Gallery ==
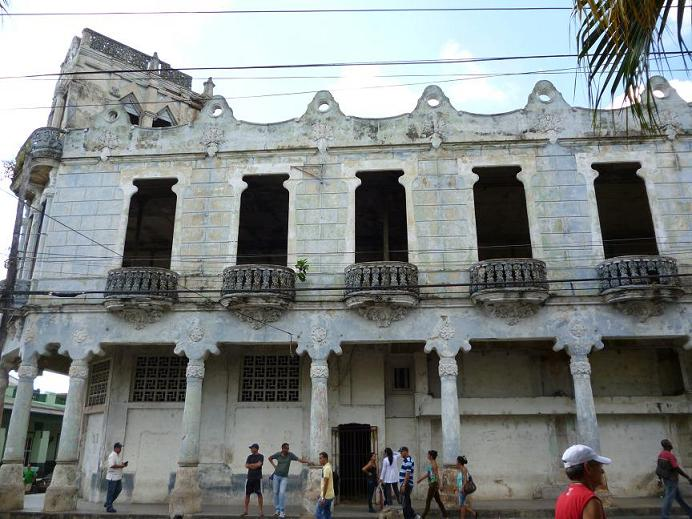
The historical building "Fruti Cuba (Fruit Juices)", located in the city centre

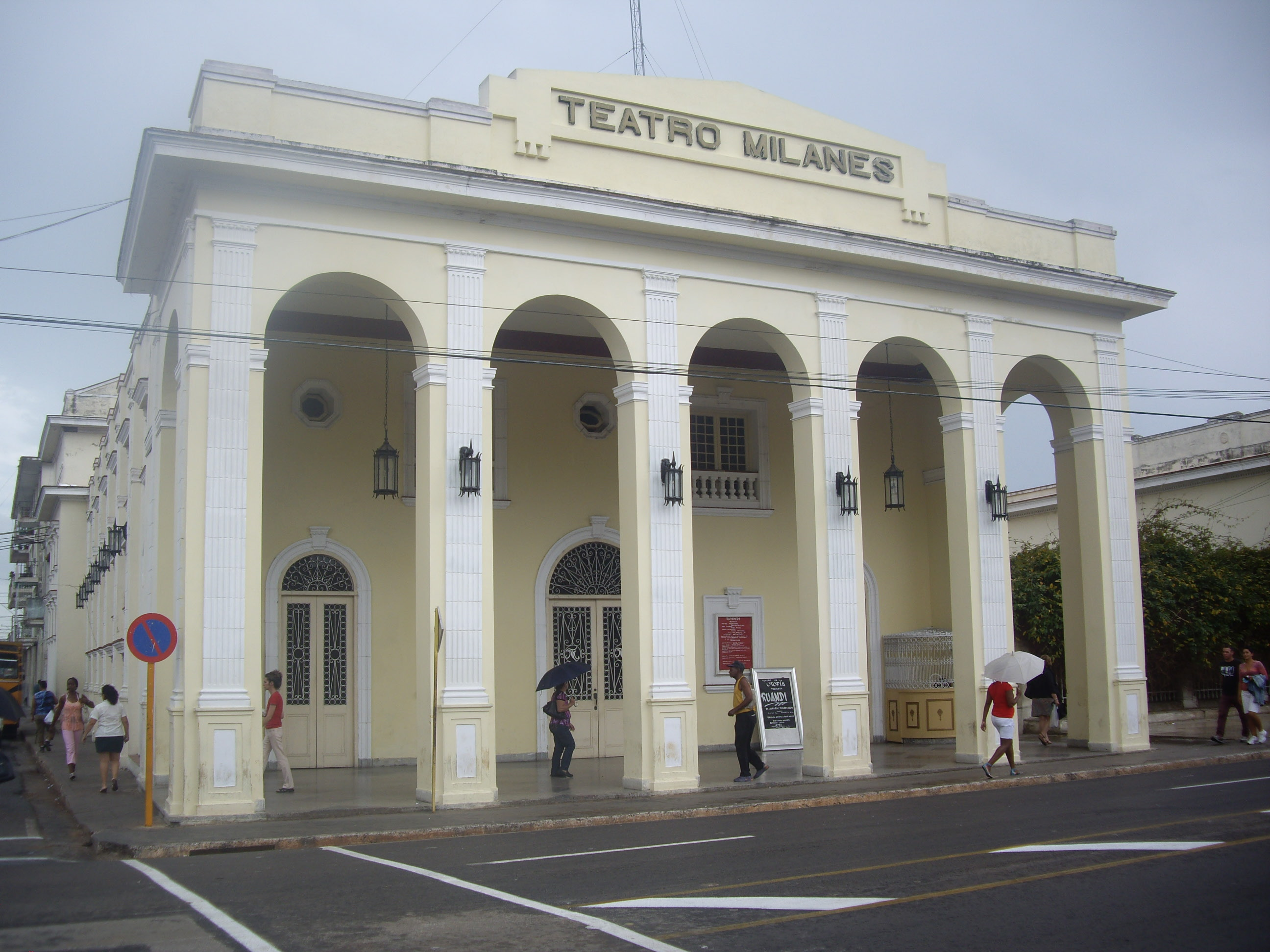
Milanés Theatre

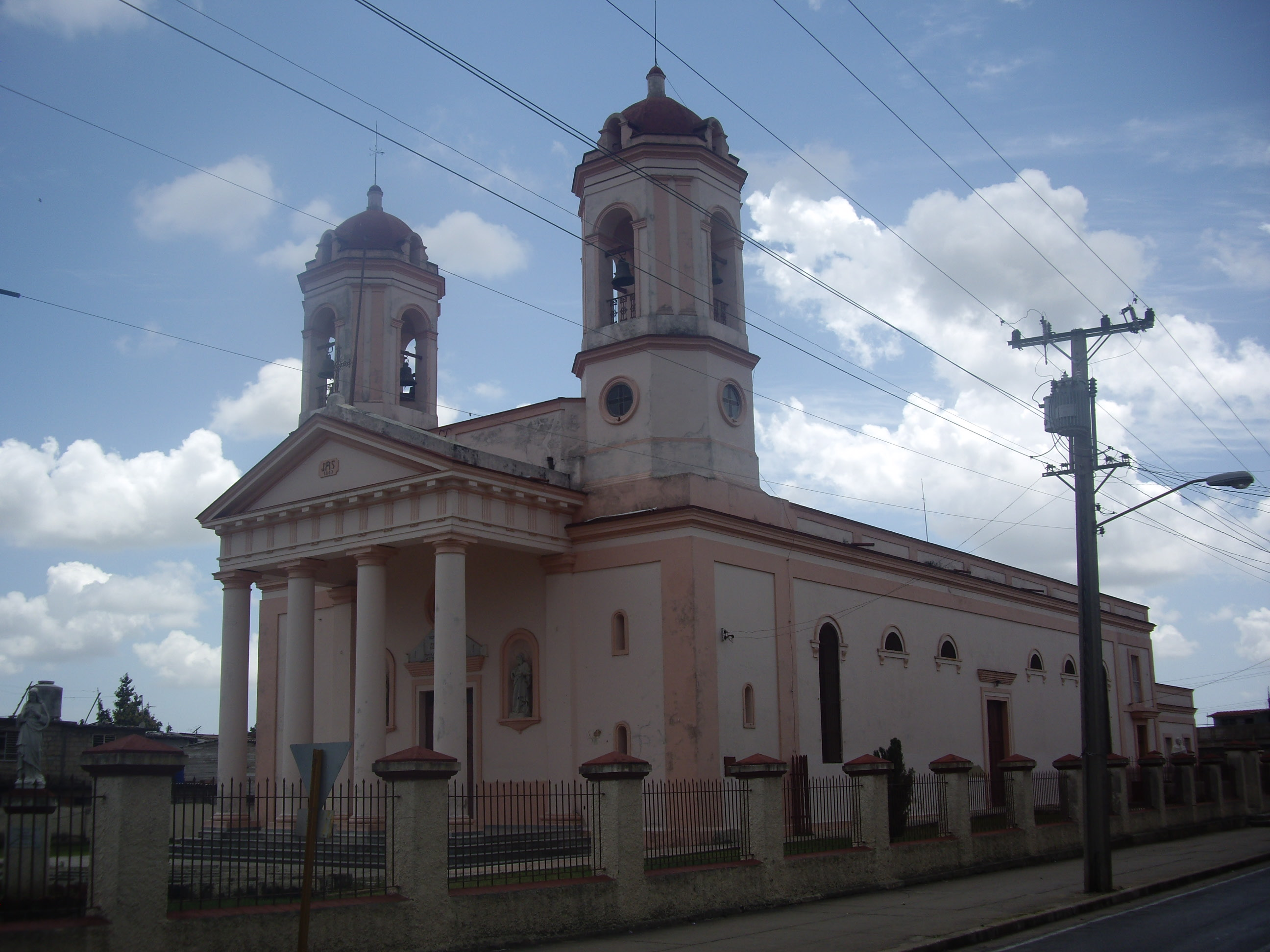
Cathedral

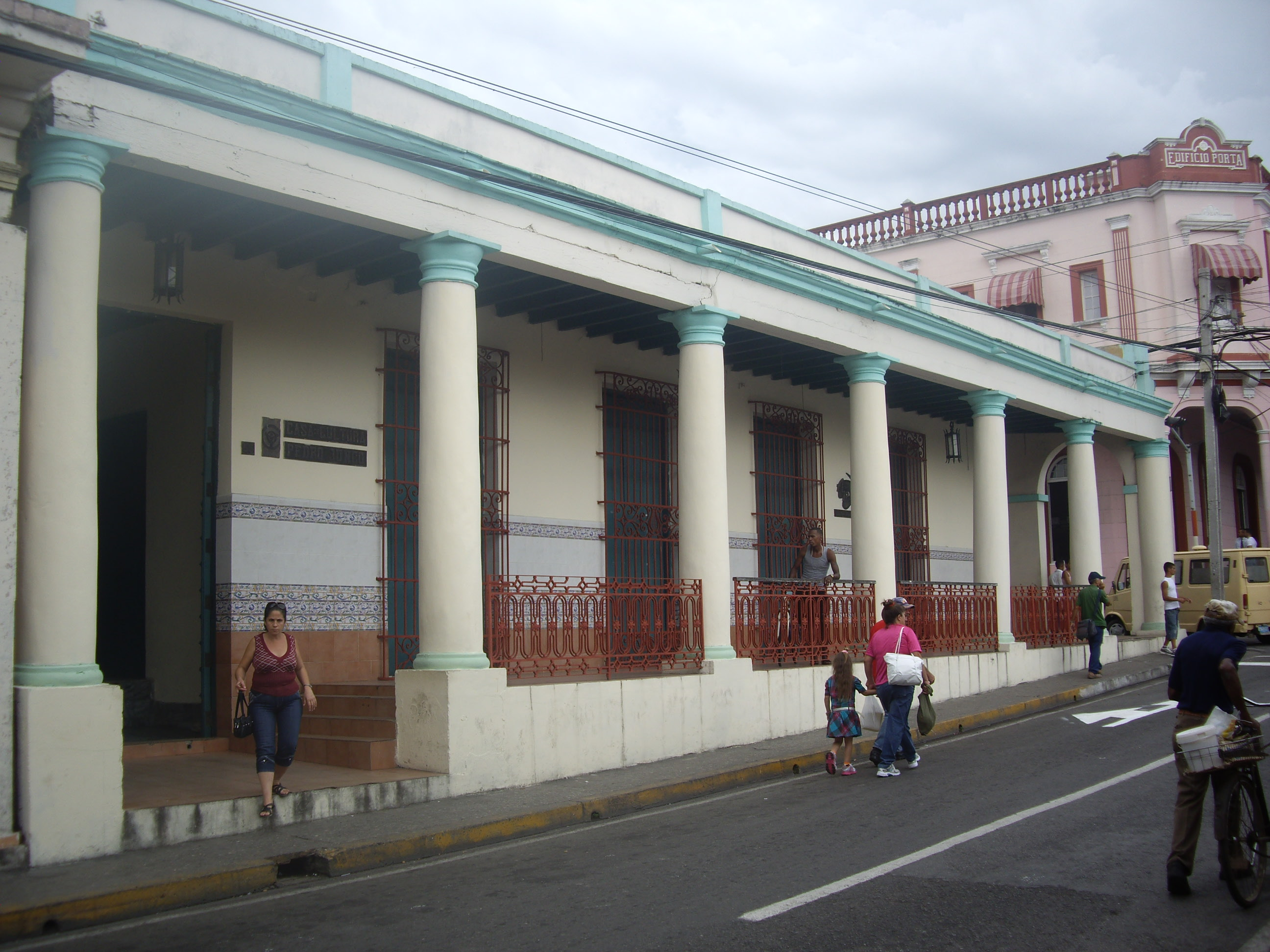
Culture house "Pedro Junco"

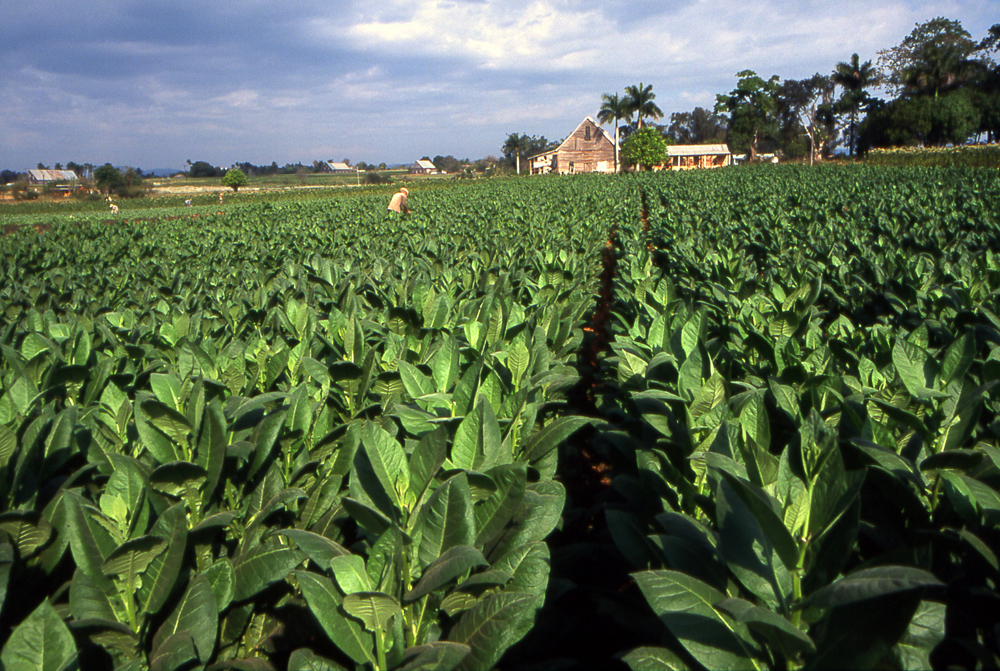
Tobacco plantation

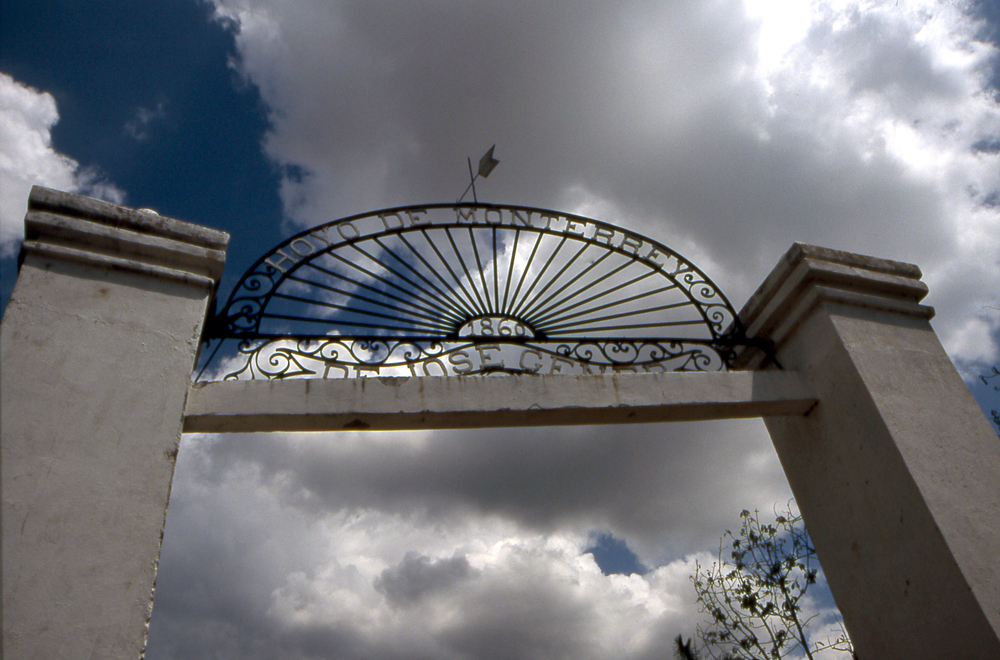
Cigar factory

== See also ==
- Vuelta Abajo - tohacco-growing region in Cuba
- Filipino Cuban
- List of cities in Cuba
- Municipalities of Cuba
