= Carlos Luna (artist) =

Cuban-American artist

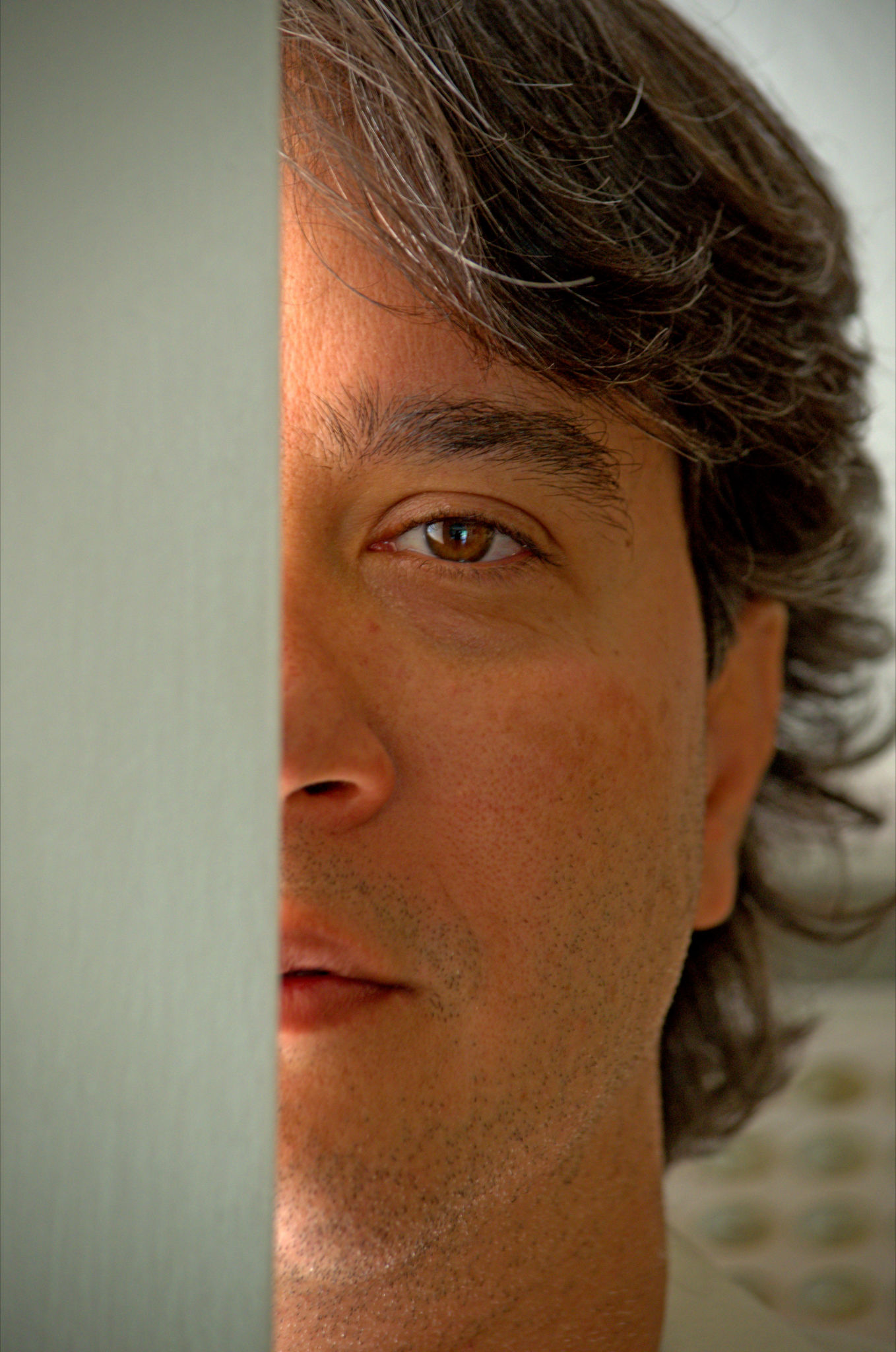
- Carlos Luna in 2011
- Born: 1969 (age 56–57); Pinar del Río, Cuba
- Known for: Painting, sculpture, printmaking, ceramics
- Spouse: Claudia Catalina

Carlos Luna (born 1969) is a contemporary Cuban-American painter, sculptor, printmaker, and ceramicist.

== Biography ==
Born 1969 in Pinar del Río, Cuba. In 1991 he emigrated to Mexico, where he met and married his wife Claudia Catalina Luna. Carlos remained in Mexico for 10 years, and in 2001 Luna was awarded the EB-1 visa from the United States of America. It affords the recipient and his family permanent residence status in the United States of America. On July 23, 2002, Luna moved to Miami, Florida, with his wife, children, and dog, he currently lives and works in Miami, Florida. In the last few years Luna began exploring different mediums and began working with Magnolia Editions making jacquard tapestries. Luna has also appeared in numerous solo and group exhibitions in the United States, Cuba, Mexico, and abroad.

== Solo exhibitions ==
Among his solo exhibitions are Flower Power (2018) at the Art of the World Gallery, Houston; Carlos Luna. Deep Line, Drawings by Carlos Luna (2017) at Boca Raton Museum of Art, Boca Raton; Carlos Luna. Green Machine: The Art of Carlos Luna (2017), at the Katzen Arts Center of American University, Washington DC; Carlos Luna.

== Group exhibitions ==
In 2018 Luna's work was chosen for Nomadic Murals: Contemporary Tapestries and Artists at the Boca Raton Museum of Art, Boca Raton. In 2011 Carlos Luna: Los Decorados was seen at the Heather James Fine Art Gallery, Palm Beach. In 2019 Crosscurrents: Contemporary Selections from the Rodríguez Collection of Cuban Artists at Foosaner Art Museum, Melbourne, Fl.
