= Death and state funeral of Fidel Castro =

2016 funeral of leader of Cuba

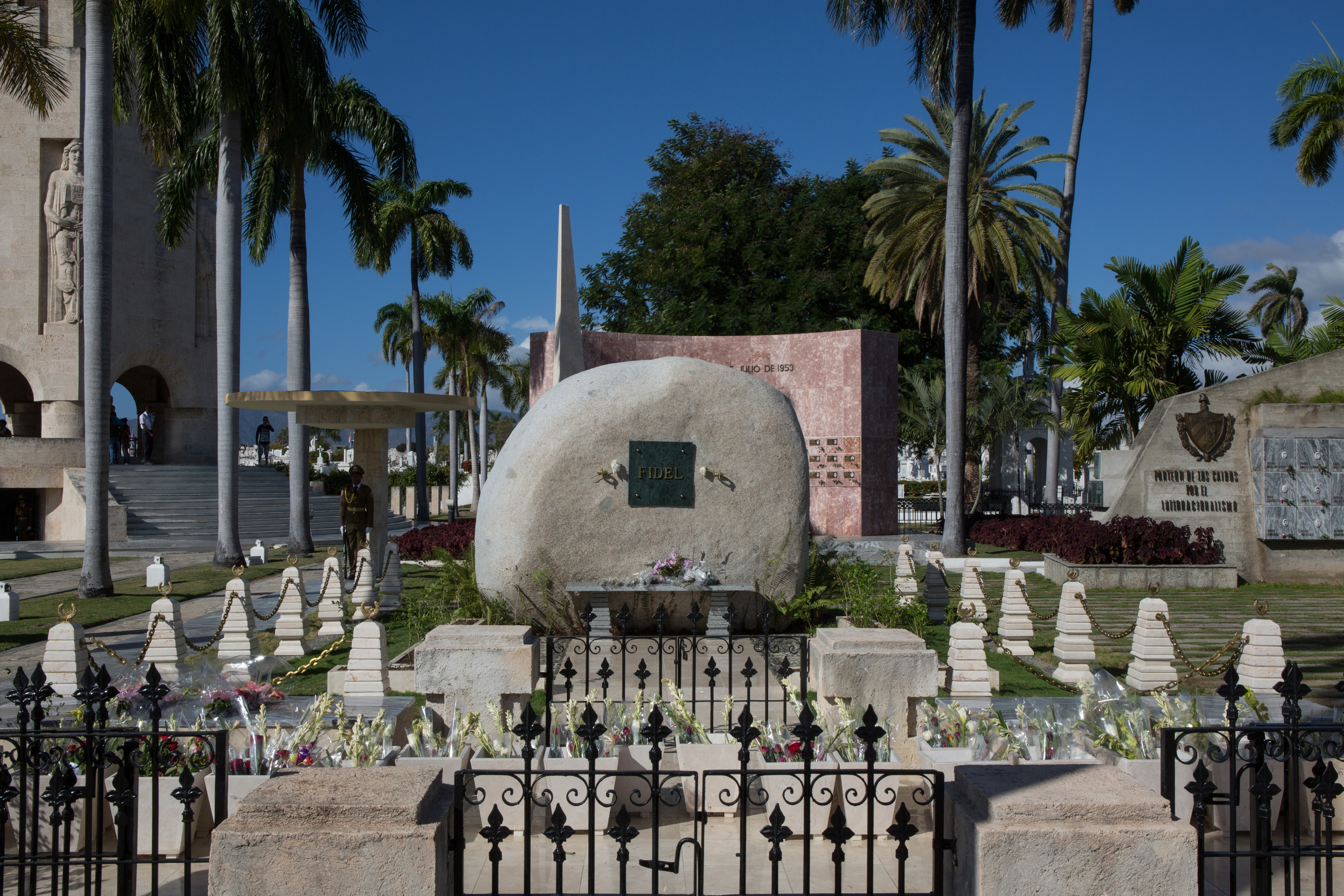
- Castro's tomb in Santa Ifigenia Cemetery
- Death date: 25 November 2016; 9 years ago at 22:29 (UTC−05:00)
- Cremation date: 26 November 2016
- Interment date: 4 December 2016

Former first secretary of the Communist Party of Cuba and president of the Council of State, Fidel Castro died of Parkinson's disease brought on by natural causes in his sleep at 22:29 (CST) on the evening of 25 November 2016, at the age of 90. His brother, Raúl Castro, who was president of the Council of State at the time, announced Fidel's death on state television. One of the most controversial political leaders of his era, Castro both inspired and dismayed people across the world during his lifetime. The London Observer stated that the only thing that his "enemies and admirers" agreed upon was that he was "a towering figure" in world affairs who "transformed a small Caribbean island into a major force in world affairs". The Daily Telegraph noted that across the world he was "either praised as a brave champion of the people, or derided as a power-mad dictator." Castro's body was cremated and his ashes were interred in Santiago de Cuba on 4 December 2016, and hundreds of thousands of Cubans commemorated the event.

== Background ==
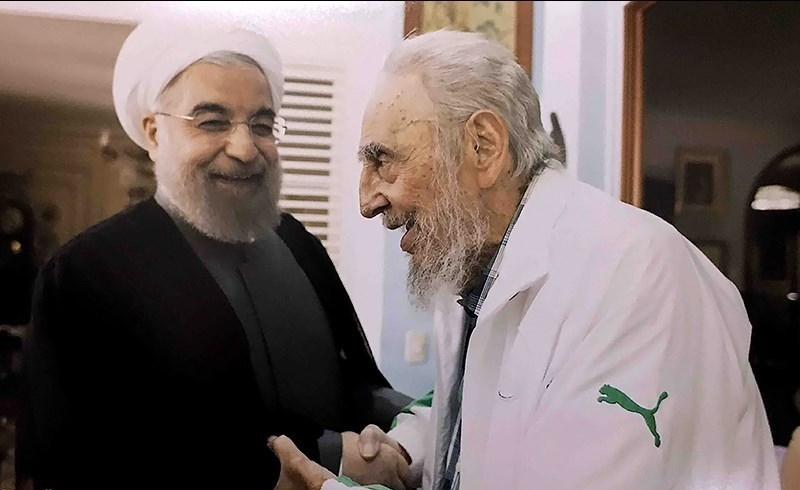
Castro (right) with Iranian president Hassan Rouhani (left) in September 2016, two months before Castro's death

Between 2006 and 2007, Castro had 3 intestinal surgeries for diverticulitis. In April 2016, Castro told the Communist Party: "I'll be 90 years old soon. Soon, I'll be like all the others. The time will come for all of us. Still, the ideas of the Cuban communists will remain as proof on this planet that if they are worked at with fervor and dignity, they can produce the material and cultural goods that human beings need, and we need to fight without a truce to obtain them." In February 2016, his older brother Ramón died at the age of 91.

Castro's death was anticipated in South Florida, with media and governments expecting and hoping that it would cause chaotic celebrations and regime change plans. The city of Miami had planned to open the Miami Orange Bowl for celebrations; schools might have dismissed early; and police and government officials might have blocked boat piers to prevent Cuban exile from trying to invade the island. The Miami Herald created a "Cuba plan" more than 20 years before Castro's death; as much as 60 pages in length, it included multiple newspaper extras and reporters joining the United States Coast Guard as it handled the expected large number of refugees fleeing the island. Its journalists prepared to enter Cuba surreptitiously; employees knew that Castro's death would interrupt any vacation or weekend. After Raúl Castro became the country's leader and visiting Cuba became easier, such plans became less important.

== Death announcement ==
President and first secretary of the Communist Party Raúl Castro somberly announced on national television: "The commander in chief of the Cuban revolution had passed away peacefully at 22:29 (CST) this evening." He recalled at the end of his speech: "¡Hasta la victoria siempre!" ("Towards victory, always!")

The Council of State of the Republic of Cuba declared nine days of national mourning from 06:00 on 26 November until 12:00 on 4 December. A statement read: "During the mourning period, all public events and activities will cease, the national flag will fly at half-mast on public buildings and at military facilities and television and radio will broadcast informative, patriotic and historical programmes." This included the postponement of the grand military parade to mark the 60th anniversary of the landing of the yacht Granma and Armed Forces Day in Havana's Plaza de la Revolucion by a month from 2 December to 2 January 2017. Foreign Minister Bruno Rodríguez Parrilla suspended a visit to the United Arab Emirates.

The Cuban Embassy in the United States made an announcement in writing: "Until forever, Commander! This No. 25, at 10:29 p.m. the Commander in Chief of the Cuban Revolution Fidel Castro Ruz passed away." It also posted an image that read: "Hasta Siempre, Comandante."

== Funeral ==
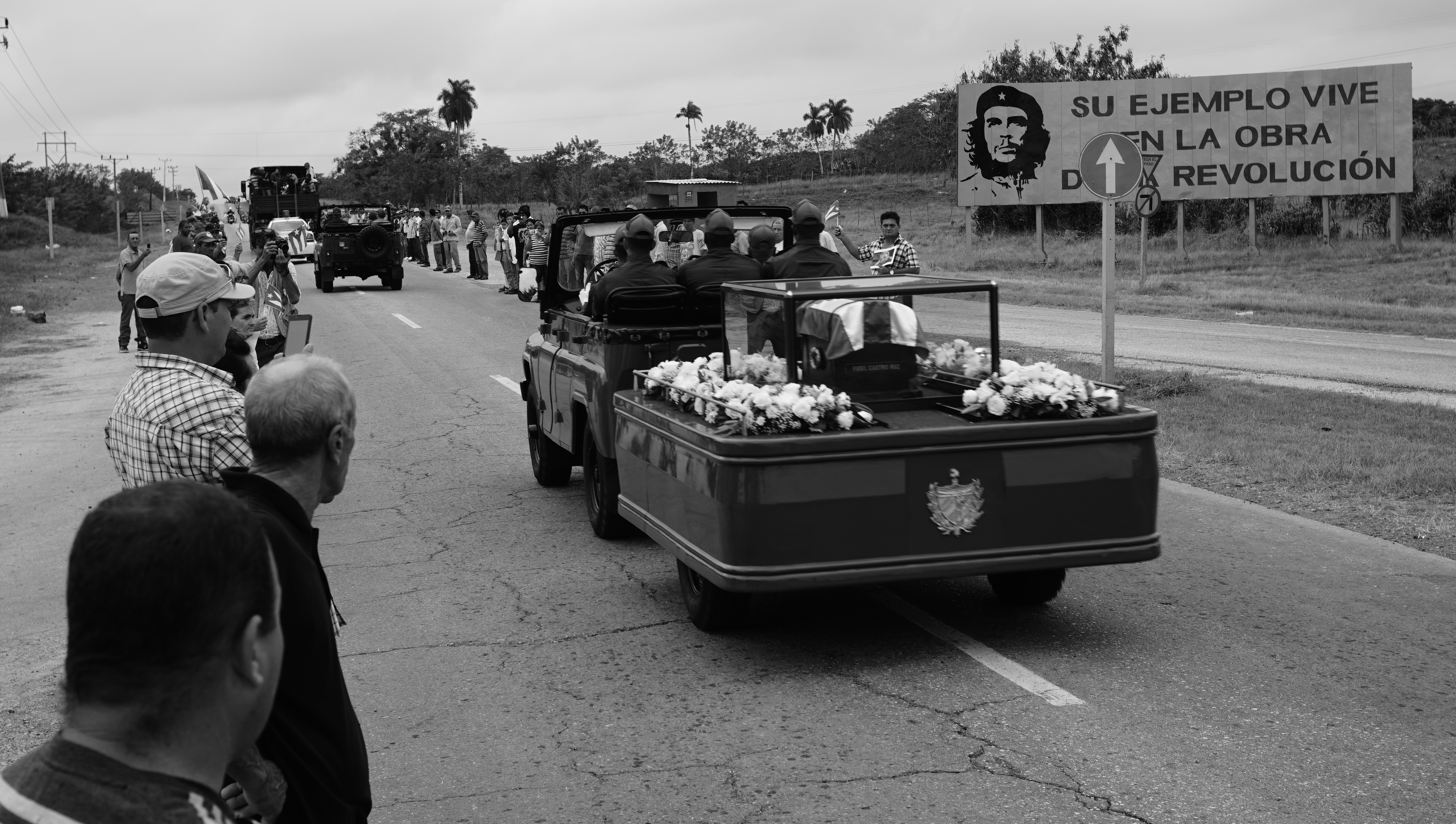
Fidel Castro's funeral procession passing through Sancti Spíritus Province, Cuba

External videos
- Raúl Castro's announcement on Fidel Castro's death on YouTube [Account Terminated]
- Fidel Castro' state funeral on YouTube

Following Castro's death, it was announced by his brother Raúl Castro, who also announced that Castro's body would be cremated. The cremation was a private affair, with only state and party officials attending together with Fidel's family and friends.

The casket carrying his ashes then lay in state for Cubans to pay homage to Castro at the José Martí Memorial in Havana on 28 and 29 November. A memorial rally then took place at the Plaza de la Revolución at 19:00 on 29 November in which President and first secretary of the Communist Party Raúl Castro, as well as various world leaders who were allies of Castro paid tribute, including the presidents of Panama, Mexico, Ecuador, Bolivia, Venezuela and South Africa, along with the prime minister of Greece and leaders of a host of smaller countries in Africa. From 29 November to 3 December the casket carrying his ashes travelled along a 900 kilometres route to Santiago de Cuba, tracing in reverse the route of the "Freedom Caravan" of January 1959 in which Castro and his rebels took power. At one point, the jeep broke down and had to be pushed by attending soldiers.

On 3 December at 19:00, another mass gathering took place at Plaza Antonio Maceo in Santiago de Cuba, with Raúl and other foreign leaders and dignitaries. People waved the flag of Cuba and sang the national anthem. Raúl Castro said in a final speech that Castro showed it was "possible to firmly maintain the inalienable principles of our sovereignty without fear to the nuclear blackmail of the United States during those days of the missile crisis in October 1962." He further added that images and statues of Castro will not be displayed in public places and roads will not be named after him. "The leader of the revolution strongly opposed any manifestation of cult of personality." and again paid tribute to Fidel. The next day, 4 December at 7:00, the interment of Castro's ashes occurred in a private ceremony in Santa Ifigenia Cemetery in Santiago de Cuba, where Cuban national hero José Martí is also buried. As a camouflage-green hearse went to the cemetery, mourners lined the streets and cheered "Viva Fidel!" and "Yo Soy, Fidel!" A secretly constructed tomb was also at the venue. Final events occurred as a 21-gun salute was fired and the ashes, in a coffin wrapped in Cuban flag, disappeared from public view as television cameras and journalists were not allowed inside, save for cameramen from the Sistema Informativo de la Televisión, which provided the live coverage for television channels islandwide.

=== Foreign dignitaries attending the state funeral ===
Most states sent delegations led by high or mid-ranking officials to the funeral; many African and Latin American states sent delegations led by presidents or prime ministers. The funeral was attended by 30 heads of state and government, two multilateral leaders and eight former leaders.

Heads of multilateral organizations
African Union	President	Nkosazana Dlamini Zuma
World Federation of Trade Unions	Secretary-General	George Mavrikos
Heads of state and government
Antigua and Barbuda	Prime Minister	Gaston Browne
Bahamas	Prime Minister	Perry Christie
Bolivia	President	Evo Morales
Canada	Governor General	David Johnston
Cape Verde	President	Jorge Carlos Fonseca
Colombia	President	Juan Manuel Santos
Congo	President	Denis Sassou Nguesso
Dominica	Prime Minister	Roosevelt Skerrit
Ecuador	President	Rafael Correa
El Salvador	President	Salvador Sánchez Cerén
Equatorial Guinea	President	Teodoro Obiang Nguema Mbasogo
Ethiopia	President	Mulatu Teshome
Greece	Prime Minister	Alexis Tsipras
Guyana	Prime Minister	Moses Nagamootoo
Haiti	President	Jocelerme Privert
Honduras	President	Juan Orlando Hernández
Jamaica	Prime Minister	Andrew Holness
Kenya	President	Uhuru Kenyatta
Mexico	President	Enrique Peña Nieto
Namibia	President	Hage Geingob
Nicaragua	President	Daniel Ortega
Panama	President	Juan Carlos Varela
Saint Lucia	Prime Minister	Allen Chastanet
Saint Vincent and the Grenadines	Prime Minister	Ralph Gonsalves
South Africa	President	Jacob Zuma
Suriname	President	Dési Bouterse
Uganda	Prime Minister	Ruhakana Rugunda
Venezuela	President	Nicolás Maduro
Zimbabwe	President	Robert Mugabe
Government representatives and others
Algeria	President of the Council of the Nation	Abdelkader Bensalah
Angola	Vice President; MPLA Secretary	Manuel Vicente; Paulo Kassoma
Argentina	Minister of Foreign Relations	Susana Malcorra
Belarus	Chief of the Presidential Administration	Viktor Sheiman
Belize	Deputy Prime Minister	Patrick Faber
Brazil	Minister of Foreign Relations; Minister of Culture; Former president Former president	José Serra; Roberto Freire; Luiz Inácio Lula da Silva; Dilma Rousseff
Cape Verde	Minister of Culture	Abraão Vicente
China	Vice-President and member of the Politburo	Li Yuanchao
Chile	President of the Senate; President of the Chamber of Deputies; Minister of Social Development	Ricardo Lagos Weber; Osvaldo Andrade; Marcos Barraza
Colombia	Delegation of the Colombian government Representatives of the FARC	Various; Various
France	Minister of Ecology; Presidential envoy for Latin America	Ségolène Royal; Jean-Pierre Bel
Gabon	President of the Senate	Lucie Milebou Aubusson
Germany	Former chancellor	Gerhard Schröder
Laos	Former General Secretary of the Lao People's Revolutionary Party	Choummaly Sayasone
India	Home Minister; Lok Sabha Deputy Speaker; BJP MP INC MP; CPI (M) General-Secretary; CPI Secretary; BJD MP; Samajwadi Party MP	Rajnath Singh; M. Thambidurai; Ramen Deka; Anand Sharma; Sitaram Yechury; D. Raja; Jhina Hikaka; Javed Ali Khan
Cambodia	Delegation of the Cambodian government	Various
Ireland	Mexico-based Ambassador; President of Sinn Féin	Sonja Hyland; Gerry Adams TD
Jamaica	Leader of the Opposition, Former prime minister	Portia Simpson-Miller
Japan	Member of the House of Representatives	Keiji Furuya
Malaysia	Ambassador to Cuba	Khairi Omar
Mozambique	Former president	Armando Guebuza
North Korea	Member of the Politburo Standing Committee	Choe Ryong-hae
Portugal	Minister Assistant	Eduardo Cabrita
Cyprus	Former president	Demetris Christofias
Russia	Chairman of the State Duma; Deputy Prime Minister	Vyacheslav Volodin; Dmitry Rogozin
Sahrawi Arab Democratic Republic	Minister of Foreign Relations	Mohamed Salem Ould Salek
Spain	Former King	Juan Carlos I of Spain
United Kingdom	Minister of State for Europe and the Americas; Shadow Foreign Secretary (Labour)	Alan Duncan; Emily Thornberry
United States of America	Deputy National Security Advisor; Ambassador-designate	Ben Rhodes; Jeffrey DeLaurentis
Uruguay	Vice-President; Former president	Raúl Fernando Sendic; José Mujica
Vietnam	Chairperson of the National Assembly and member of the Politburo	Nguyễn Thị Kim Ngân

UK Opposition Leader Jeremy Corbyn was scheduled to attend as part of his country's delegation. However, his attendance was later denied. U.S. preacher and civil rights leader Reverend Jesse Jackson spoke at a memorial for Castro in Havana. Others in attendance included actor Danny Glover and Argentine football player Diego Maradona, who said: "I feel Cuban."

=== Other memorials ===
Memorials in Castro's names were conducted in places outside Cuba:

Algeria declared eight days of mourning; Bolivia decreed seven days of national mourning; Equatorial Guinea decreed three days of national mourning; Nicaragua decreed nine days of national mourning; North Korea declared a period of mourning for three days; and Venezuela decreed three days of national mourning., Namibia declared a period of mourning for three days Uruguay, Vietnam, Angola decreed one day of national mourning; Trinidad and Tobago decreed that the national flag be flown at half-mast for one day; while Haiti decreed three days of mourning; and Dominica declared national mourning for Castro. The Sahrawi Republic government declared three days of mourning.

In Venezuela, a ceremony was held at Mountain Barrack, where President Nicolas Maduro told a crowd on 27 November: "Men and women of this great Latin American and Caribbean homeland! Fidel and (Hugo) Chavez, who are already together there in the heaven of the just, are more future than anything else in the battles we are going to fight today. And I am sure they have only one destiny: the definitive victory of their ideas. Long live the eternal memory of Fidel Castro. Long live the example of the martyrs. Long live the legacy of Hugo Chavez." In Bolivia, President Evo Morales spoke at Ivirgarzama in Cochabamba saying that Castro's fight had not been for Cuban and Latin American people alone, but "for the people of the world who fight for their liberation." He further gave tribute to "a human being" who "gave his life for the people of the world." In Quito, Ecuador, the statue of Castro was a focal point as people also congregated outside the National Theater in tribute. Mourners also signed a book of condolences at the Cuban embassy, while a concert was organised outside the House of Culture, where Castro had once visited.

About 500 people also gathered at the Cuban embassy in Mexico City. Vietnamese president Tran Dai Quang, who was the last head of state to meet Castro in Cuba, and Prime Minister Nguyen Xuan Phuc paid their respects at the Cuban embassy in Hanoi on 28 November in commemoration of Castro. Hundreds of other Vietnamese people attended the ceremony and brought flowers to the embassy too. In Cape Town, mourners reflected of Castro's anti-apartheid solidarity with Nelson Mandela.

== Reactions ==
=== International ===
==== Supranational ====
- European Union – President of the European Commission Jean-Claude Juncker issued a statement in which conveyed condolences to Castro's family and the people of Cuba. He pointed out that the death of Castro meant that the world has lost a man who was a hero for many but whose legacy will be judged by history. High Representative of the Union for Foreign Affairs and Security Policy Federica Mogherini said that Castro was "a man of determination and an historical figure" and that his death came as Cuba faced "times of great challenges and uncertainties." She added that relations would continue to grow.
- United Nations – Secretary-General Ban Ki-moon said: "At this time of national mourning, I offer the support of the United Nations to work alongside the people of the island. Under former President Castro, Cuba made advances in the fields of education literacy and health. I hope that Cuba will continue to advance on a path of reform and greater prosperity. He left a major imprint on his country and on global politics. His revolutionary ideals left few indifferent. He was a strong voice for social justice in global discussions at the UN General Assembly and international and regional forums."

71st session of the United Nations General Assembly President Peter Thomson issued a statement that read: "Fidel Castro was one of the iconic leaders of the 20th century. With a great love for his homeland and the Cuban people, he dedicated his life to their welfare and development. A tireless advocate for equity in the international arena, Fidel Castro was an inspirational figure for developing countries in particular. His dedication to their advancement, especially in the fields of education and health, will be long remembered." Later, on 29 November, he led the UNGA into marking a minute of silence in memory of Castro.
- Former Secretary-General Kofi Annan issued a statement that read: "Today I mourn the loss of a friend, the late Cuban leader Fidel Castro. Securing the welfare of the Cuban people and ensuring the independence of his nation shaped much of Fidel Castro's thinking and many of his actions. Whether one shared his political views or disagreed with them, Fidel Castro was one of Latin America's most remarkable leaders. In the course of his long life he overcame countless adversities and rarely chose the easy and comfortable path. I met Fidel Castro many times over the years and came to appreciate his extraordinary intellect, sharp mind, and his ability to engage in constructive dialogue. Farewell Fidel."

==== States ====
Africa

- Algeria – President Abdelaziz Bouteflika expressed his condolences and stated that the "people of Algeria [...] have a special relationship with El Commandante, made of respect, admiration and mutual affection." An eight-day national mourning period was announced.
- Angola – President José Eduardo dos Santos expressing his condolences and added Castro was a figure "of transcendent historical importance, who left his mark on his era by the role he played in his country and in the great transformation of humanity, for the sake of freedom, social justice and development." He further expressed his gratitude for "the solidarity that Cuba offered to the struggle of colonised peoples, in particular to the Angolan people;" he further pointed out Cuba's contribution to Angola's "sovereignty and territorial integrity" in resistance to "the aggression of the then racist regime of South Africa."
- Burkina Faso – President Roch Marc Christian Kaboré expressed condolences to the Cuban people "at the death of the leader of the Cuban Revolution, Fidel Castro."
- Burundi – President Pierre Nkurunziza offered his condolences to Raúl Castro and the people of Cuba. He also saluted Castro as a "great leader."
- Cape Verde – President Jorge Carlos Fonseca expressed his "deep condolences" to Raúl Castro and the Cuban people. He added that Castro was both a "controversial figure" and "charismatic leader" who "led one of the most important revolutions of the twentieth century...that had an impact not only in Cuba but also in Latin America and other African and Asian countries." He also praised Castro's work in building the relationship between Cape Verde and Cuba and for the aid of Cuban health workers in Cape Verde post-independence.
- Congo – President Denis Sassou Nguesso sent a condolence letter to his Cuban counterpart in which he praised Castro's as an "emblematic figure of the peoples' emancipation" and who had devoted himself to "the triumph of noble causes." He further stressing Castro's contribution to the liberation struggle of African countries.
- Egypt – President Abdel Fattah el-Sisi, in a letter, expressed his condolences to Raúl Castro and the Cuban people. He defined Castro as "a symbol of struggle and defending the issues of developing countries."
- Equatorial Guinea – President Teodoro Obiang said that he shared with Castro "a personal friendship and political ideas."
- Ethiopia – President Mulatu Teshome:"Castro was a friend of Ethiopia who helped it in its struggle to defend its territorial integrity." Prime Minister Hailemariam Desalegn said that Castro "will be remembered forever."
- Gabon – President Ali Bongo Ondimba expressed condolences to the Cuban people.
- Gambia – President Yahya Jammeh suspended his re-election campaign to mourn Castro's death.
- Ghana – President John Dramani Mahama wrote: "Comrade Fidel Castro will forever remain in our hearts and minds – he helped shape the world!"
- Kenya – President Uhuru Kenyatta praised Castro as "a legendary freedom fighter" and stated: "Fidel Castro successfully led a revolution inspired by his devout vision of a free, equitable and prosperous Cuba. His success did not stop at the revolution; his government proceeded to successfully implement social policies which have continued to bestow the benefits of the best social services for all Cubans. […] We are now left with his legacy and an obligation to continue the struggle for the economic liberation of the South, reform of international governance to reflect our diversity and sovereign aspirations, and an end to exclusion and marginalization of nations and peoples".
  - Leader of the Opposition Raila Odinga praised Castro as "a great friend and true friend of Africa and other parts of the world that had to fight long and bitter wars to attain freedom from colonialism." Noting Castro's outspoken opposition to apartheid in South Africa, he described him as "a source of inspiration and courage for all those who value and fought for freedom. I send heartfelt and deep condolences to his family and to the people of Cuba."
- Liberia – President Ellen Johnson Sirleaf lamented, in a message to the Cuban government, the "irreparable loss" of the "historic leader and ideologist of the Cuban Revolution."
- Malawi – President Peter Mutharika expressed "his most deep and sincere condolences" to his Cuban counterpart, the Cuban government and the Cuban people.
- Mozambique – President Filipe Nyusi sent a message to Raúl Castro where he expressed his condolences "to the heroic brotherly people of Cuba" for the passing of "one of the greatest political icons from our time, whose impact and recognition go beyond Cuba and extend towards the whole world and all mankind." He said Castro's contributions to Mozambican independence and social progress are "a valued legacy which will be passed on to the future generations."
- Namibia – President Hage Geingob wrote: "The death of #Fidel signals the end of an era. Our comrade is no more but his revolutionary legacy will remain with Namibia forever." He included three pictures of when the two leaders had met at an unknown date.
- Nigeria – President Muhammadu Buhari wrote: "I received with sadness the news of the death of Fidel Castro. My deepest condolences to the Government and people of Cuba. Fidel Castro was a great friend to Africa, to countries in the Global South and to the Non-Aligned Movement. His place in history is assured, given his sustained successful commitment and towering role in the liberation and anti-colonialism struggles in Africa."
- Rwanda – President Paul Kagame wrote: "RIP Fidel Castro, tenacious fighter who lived a full liberation life & condolences to the resilient people of Cuba."
- Sahrawi Arab Democratic Republic – President Brahim Ghali sent a message of condolences to his Cuban counterpart. He wrote: "It is with deep regret and sorrow that we learned the news of the death of president and revolutionary leader Fidel Castro". He declared a national mourning for three days.
- South Africa – President Jacob Zuma expressed his condolences to the government and people of Cuba and noted that Castro "inspired the Cuban people to join us in our own struggle against apartheid" and "as a way of paying homage to the memory of President Castro, the strong bonds of solidarity, cooperation and friendship that exist between South Africa and Cuba must be maintained and nurtured."
  - The Nelson Mandela Foundation sent condolences to the people and government of Cuba.
- Tanzania – President John Magufuli expressed his and the Tanzanian people's "deepest sympathies […] to the people of Cuba."
- Uganda – President Yoweri Museveni called Castro "a friend, brother and leader" and expressed his condolences to the Cuban people.
- Zambia – President Edgar Lungu expressed condolences to Raúl Castro and the Cuban people "on the loss of an iconic and great leader."
- Zimbabwe – President Robert Mugabe praised Fidel Castro "for fighting for his people and standing up against [the] American blockade." Upon arriving at Castro's funeral, he said: "Fidel wasn't just your leader, Fidel was the leader of all revolutionaries."

Americas

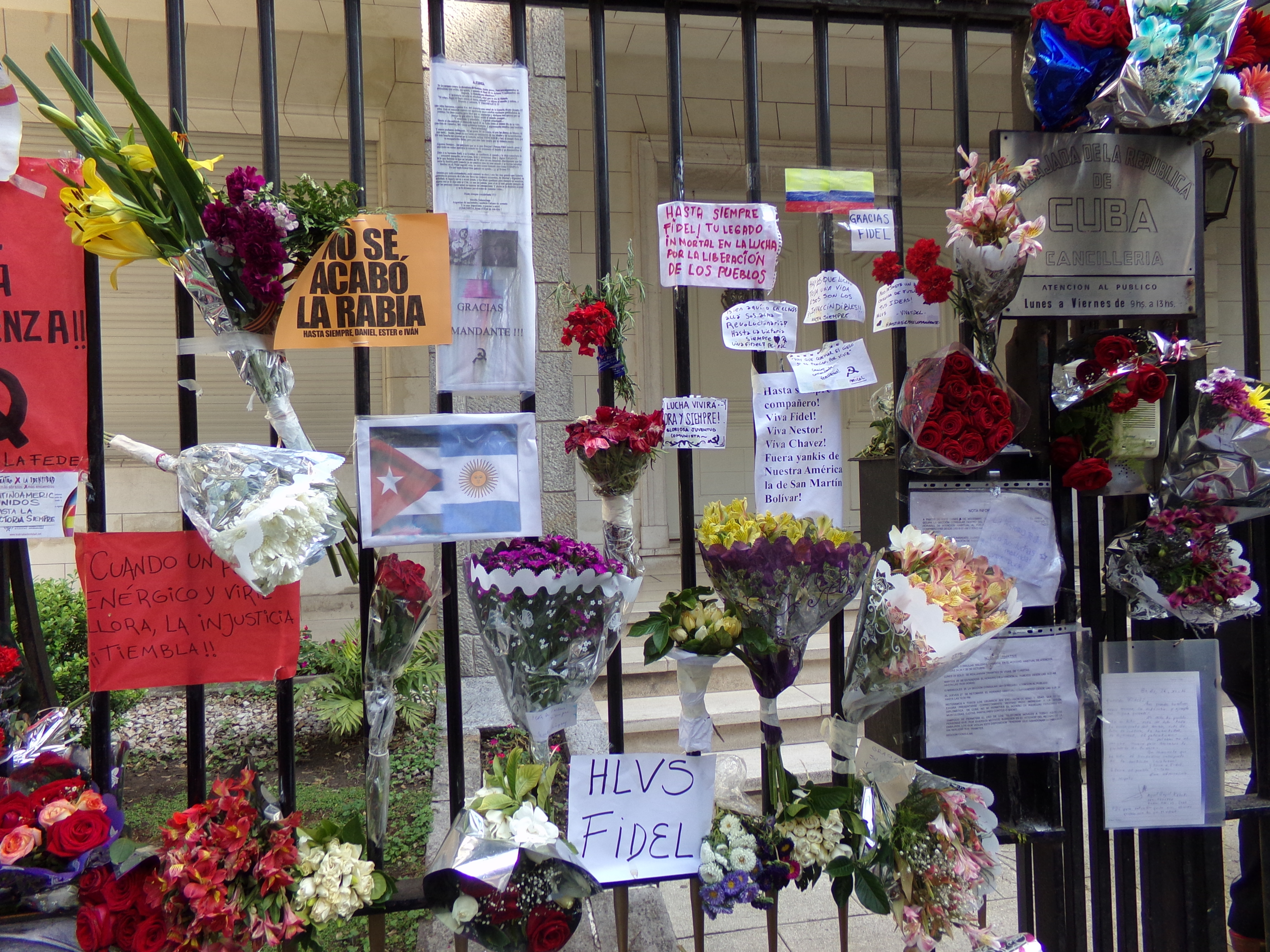
Embassy of Cuba in Buenos Aires, Argentina

- Antigua and Barbuda – Prime Minister Gaston Browne praised Castro for his government's generosity to other Caribbean countries, in particular in providing training to their future "doctors, civil engineers, architects, computer science engineers, and other professionals." He stated: "The world has lost a great man; the Caribbean has lost a fertile mind and a very worthy leader who was deeply loved by his own people".
- Argentina – President Mauricio Macri wrote that he expresses his "condolences to the Cuban government." Vice-President Gabriela Michetti also expressed her condolences "to the government and all the Cuban people." Foreign minister Susana Malcorra echoed Michetti's expression and further considered that Castro's passing "closes an important chapter of Latin American history." She added that "Fidel's death has a very important impact in [sic] the Cuban people, both in those in favor and in those against [him]." A Foreign Ministry statement mentioned Castro's "relevant role in the history of the 20th century" and added Argentina's recognition for his "unconditional and permanent support on the Malvinas question."
  - Former president Cristina Fernández de Kirchner issued a short statement published on social networks: "Fidel and Cuba are definitively entering Big History. Together with his people, [he was] an example of dignity and sovereignty." She added expressions of sympathy for Castro's next of kin, including "Dalia, his partner." Fernández later wrote an op-ed for Página/12 in which she recalled her personal relationship with Castro and characterised him as a "universal legend" and "the last of moderns, the last of global world leaders from before the fall of the Berlin Wall, [...] men and women [who had] ideas, programmes, and clear and precise compromises, who had their focus on politics as a driving force for transformation, almost incunabula [sic] in these times of postmodernity and liquid age." She also visited the Cuban embassy to pay her respects.
- Barbados – Prime Minister Freundel Stuart issued a statement that read: "The death of the former President of the Republic of Cuba marks the passing of an indomitable figure who changed the course of history in his country and the region. Fidel Castro Ruz represents as few others do, a symbol of anti-imperialism and continuous struggle for independence. He inspired many revolutionaries around the world to fight for their ideals. His support for the anti-apartheid struggle is a dimension of his legacy that will not be forgotten. […] We [also] recall his defence of environmental security, a principle that we share. Our relationship with Mr Castro demonstrated that differences in ideology do not have to impede fruitful and constructive relations".
- Belize – Prime Minister Dean Barrow said: "Fidel was a giant, a titan. His life of sacrifice and undeniable dedication not only to Cuba but to the entire Third World makes him an imposing world figure. Fidel taught us the true meaning of courage and resistance in the pursuit of victory even in the worst circumstances. Like no one, Fidel represented the spirit of the Cuban nation and was the living example of patriotism and the struggle of its people for independence. Belize joins the rest of the Caribbean and the world in tribute to Fidel and his historical legacy."
- Bolivia – President Evo Morales said that he was "deeply saddened. Fidel [was] the only man in the world with so many principles and so many values. He made so much history not only for Cuba, but also for the planet. That is socialism. There will never again be a man or comrade like Fidel, who devoted his life, his knowledge and his struggle not only to the Cuban people but to all the people of the world."
- Brazil – President Michel Temer issued a statement that read: "Fidel Castro was a man of convictions. He marked the second half of the 20th century with a firm defense of the ideas he believed in."
  - Former president Lula da Silva published an article on his personal website where he praised Castro as "the greatest of all Latin-Americans" and called him "a friend and a comrade." He added that "for the peoples of our continent and workers from the poorest countries, especially for the men and women of my generation, Fidel was always a voice of struggle and hope." He considered that Castro's "combative and caring spirit encouraged dreams of freedom, sovereignty and equality."
  - Former president Dilma Rousseff defined Castro as "one of the most influential political expressions of the 20th century, [a] visionary who believed in the construction of a fraternal and fair society, without hunger nor exploitation, in a strong and united Latin America." She finished her note with an unnamed poem from German playwright and poet Bertolt Brecht's play The Mother. It is roughly translated as "Those who are weak do not fight. / Those who are stronger might fight for an hour. / Those who are stronger still might fight for many years. / The strongest fight their whole life. / They are the indispensable ones."
- Canada – Prime Minister Justin Trudeau extended his condolences and said of Castro that he was a "legendary revolutionary and orator." He added: "It is with deep sorrow that I learned today of the death of Cuba's longest serving president. Fidel Castro was a larger than life leader who served his people for almost half a century. […] Mr Castro made significant improvements to the education and healthcare of his island nation. While a controversial figure, both Mr Castro's supporters and detractors recognise his tremendous dedication and love for the Cuban people who had a deep and lasting affection for 'El Comandante'. […] We join the people of Cuba today in mourning the loss of this remarkable leader." He added that "I know my father was very proud to call him a friend and I had the opportunity to meet Fidel when my father passed away. It was also a real honour to meet his three sons and his brother, president Raúl Castro, during my recent visit to Cuba. On behalf of all Canadians, Sophie and I offer our deepest condolences to the family, friends and many, many supporters of Mr Castro."
- Chile – President Michelle Bachelet wrote: "My condolences to President Raúl Castro for the death of Fidel, a leader for dignity and social justice in Cuba and Latin America."
- Colombia – President Juan Manuel Santos said: "We regret the death of Fidel Castro. We accompany his brother Raúl and his family at this time. Our solidarity with the Cuban people. Fidel Castro acknowledged at the end of his days that armed struggle was not the way. This contributed to ending the Colombian conflict."
  - FARC Commander Rodrigo Londoño Echeverri (a.k.a. Timochenko) wrote: "He's left us as one of the great men of the Americas and the world. Eternal glory to his memory! Long live Fidel." FARC's chief negotiator in the recently signed peace agreement, hosted by Cuba, Ivan Marquez wrote that Castro was "the most admirable revolutionary of the 20th century. He has left his own trail of humanity in the sky. Thank you Fidel for your immense love of Colombia. May the peace agreement in Havana be our last homage."
- Costa Rica – President Luis Guillermo Solís said: "I express to the people and Government of Cuba my condolences on the death of Commander of the Revolution Fidel Castro Ruz."
- Dominica – Prime Minister Roosevelt Skerrit praised Castro's "very long and positive impact on the entire world" and his generosity and his commitment to people's freedom around the world. He announced flags would be flown at half-mast until Castro's funeral.
- Dominican Republic – President Danilo Medina sent a letter to Raúl Castro in which he wrote Fidel Castro "made priesthood of the exercise of politics" [sic] and had "a long life devoted to defending the wishes of his people and the world." Medina expressed his condolences to Castro's closest relatives, as well as to "the government and the brotherly Cuban people, joining ourselves to the worldwide expressions of solidarity."
- Ecuador – President Rafael Correa wrote: "He was a great one. Fidel is dead. Long live Cuba! Long live Latin America!" He added: "Fidel accomplished his mission, liberating his beloved Cuba and giving proof that another world is possible" and also defined Castro as "probably the most influential Latin American from the 20th century."
- El Salvador – President Salvador Sánchez Cerén issued a statement that read his government expressed "eternal gratitude" to Castro, an "eternal friend," as well as to the Cuban people for help "in the most difficult times." Which was read by the media as a reference to Cuba's support during the Salvadoran Civil War to Farabundo Marti National Liberation Front. It added that Castro's "example will live forever in our struggles and will flower in the noble ideas of new generations."
- Grenada – Prime Minister Keith Mitchell described Castro as "a consistent friend of the Grenadian people" and recalled that Cuba had "selflessly helped educate thousands of our current professionals, particularly in the field of medicine" despite "immeasurable hostility" from the United States. He added that Castro had also helped Grenada build the Maurice Bishop International Airport, thus making Cuba "the great godfather of Grenada's present development. And we can now ensure that [Castro's] legacy will endure, and his contribution to make the world better will always be remembered."
- Guatemala – President Jimmy Morales expressed "deep sadness" at the death of Castro and said that he was a "historic leader of the Cuban Revolution." He added: "The people and government of Guatemala will never forget Fidel Castro for being a friend who gave [us] a hand when we needed it the most."
- Guyana – Prime Minister Moses Nagamootoo called Castro an "international gift to humanity" and called "his and Cuba's contribution to humanity and the Caribbean...unmatched by any other nation in terms of brotherly and sisterly relations."
- Haiti – President Jocelerme Privert expressed his deepest condolences and extended to all the Cuban people.
- Honduras – President Juan Orlando Hernández wrote: "Our condolences to President Raúl Castro, the Government and the Cuban people for the death of Commander Fidel Castro."
- Jamaica – Prime Minister Andrew Holness issued a statement which read Castro "will go down in the annals of history as one of the leaders who, though coming from a Caribbean island developing state, has had the greatest impact on world history. Many Jamaicans still vividly remember his visits to Jamaica and his passionate speeches in defence of the right to self-determination." He further noted that Castro's "building of excellent education and health systems in Cuba, has become an outstanding model for the world" and "the people of Jamaica remain deeply appreciative of the significant contribution that Cuban medical personnel continue to make to the Jamaica health services." A parallel article from the official Jamaica Information Service highlighted that Castro was "a friend of Jamaica" whose government assisted Jamaica in healthcare, education and sports. It also read Castro "was praised as an intellectual, with a strong commitment to self-reliance and programmes that contribute to the social and economic development of countries in the region."
  - Leader of the Opposition Portia Simpson Miller issued a statement that read she considered meeting Castro as "one of the great honours of my life." She added that Castro "dedicated his whole life to the struggle for Cuba's social and economic revolution and the liberation of the Cuban people from poverty, landlessness, housing insecurity, ignorance and ill-health. [...] Despite the injustice of a decades-old economic embargo, Fidel Castro steered his country towards economic self-sufficiency and boldly asserted Cuba's political independence and national pride." She also highlighted the importance of Castro's government and Cuban people's willingness "to share their modest resources and social successes with the rest of the world, in particular, other less developed countries in the Caribbean, Latin America and Africa," including Jamaica.
- Mexico – President Enrique Peña Nieto said that Castro was a friend of Mexico, who had promoted bilateral relationships based on "respect, dialogue and solidarity. He added: "I lament the passing of Fidel Castro Ruz, leader of the Cuban revolution and emblem of the 20th century."
- Nicaragua – President Daniel Ortega looked back at Castro as a man who "moralised the entire [Latin American] region after decades of oppression" and was "instrumental in the liberation of several countries." He further thanked Cuba for having helped develop a national campaign to bring literacy to the poor in Nicaragua and he promised Nicaragua would "continue to wage the battles for justice, peace and freedom, inspired by the living thought of Fidel. Long live Cuba, long live Fidel!"
- Panama – President Juan Carlos Varela expressed his condolences to the people and government.
- Paraguay – The Foreign Ministry offered its condolences.
- Peru – President Pedro Pablo Kuczynski expressed his "most sincere condolences to the Cuban government and people at this very sad time; we salute the memory of the remembered Fidel Castro."
  - Former president Ollanta Humala said: "Fidel, a revolutionary, has left. A friend of solidarity of Peru and Latin America. My condolences and those of Nadine, to all the Cuban people."
- Saint Vincent and the Grenadines – Prime Minister Ralph Gonsalves stated that Castro had been a "good friend" to his country. During an official reception, he marked a minute of silence as a gesture of respect, along with Governor General Sir Frederick Ballantyne and Prince Harry, fifth in line to the country's throne, and who was visiting Saint Vincent at the time.
- Trinidad and Tobago – Prime Minister Dr. Keith Rowley expressed his condolences and said that Castro's death marked the end "of an iconic period of history not only for the Caribbean and Latin American region, but also for the world." He further indicated that "on behalf of the Government and people of the Republic of Trinidad and Tobago, it is with great sadness that I extend deepest condolences to the Government and people of Cuba and to his family on the passing of former President, Fidel Castro, who was one of the world's longest serving leaders."
  - Leader of the Opposition Kamla Persad-Bissessar recalled Castro's "humble beginnings," his will to "reject the dominance of his island by foreign capitalist interests" and his "enduring legacy" in improving the lives of the Cuban people: "He nationalised and redistributed land and implemented programs to raise literacy and education among the poor rural population. He also created a free universal health care system."
- United States – The White House under the second Obama administration issued a statement that read: "We extend a hand of friendship to the Cuban people. We know that this moment fills Cubans – in Cuba and in the United States – with powerful emotions, recalling the countless ways in which Fidel Castro altered the course of individual lives, families, and of the Cuban nation. History will record and judge the enormous impact of this singular figure on the people and world around him." It further noted that the "relationship between the United States and Cuba was marked by discord and profound political disagreements. During my presidency, we have worked hard to put the past behind us, pursuing a future in which the relationship between our two countries is defined not by our differences but by the many things that we share as neighbors and friends – bonds of family, culture, commerce, and common humanity. This engagement includes the contributions of Cuban Americans, who have done so much for our country and who care deeply about their loved ones in Cuba." The embassy lowered its flag to half-mast in a show of respect.
  - Senate Majority Leader Mitch McConnell (R-KY) said: "While Fidel Castro is gone, sadly the oppression that was the hallmark of his era is not." Meanwhile, half Cuban-American Senator Ted Cruz (R-TX) said: "Fidel Castro's death cannot bring back his thousands of victims, nor can it bring comfort to their families. Today we remember them and honor the brave souls who fought the lonely fight against the brutal Communist dictatorship he imposed on Cuba." Other Cuban-Americans, Senator Marco Rubio (R-FL) said history will remember Castro as an "evil, murderous dictator. Fidel Castro seized power promising to bring freedom and prosperity to Cuba, but his communist regime turned it into an impoverished island prison. Over six decades, millions of Cubans were forced to flee their own country, and those accused of opposing the regime were routinely jailed and even killed." He added that he hoped President Barack Obama sends "no one" to the funeral. Representative Ileana Ros-Lehtinen (R-FL) wrote on Twitter: "We must seize the moment and help write a new chapter in the history of #Cuba; that of a Cuba that is free, democratic, and prosperous." Although, she added that with Raúl Castro still in charge, change would be unlikely. She added: "A tyrant is dead." Representative Carlos Curbelo (R-FL) also wrote: "The passing of the dictator marks the end of a long, horrifying chapter in #Cuba's history. The #Cuban people need our solidarity #Castro." Representative Mario Diaz-Balart (R-FL) also wrote:" Today, a tyrant is dead. Although his totalitarian dictatorship deeply scarred a once prosperous nation, his death ushers in a renewed hope that the Cuban people finally will be free." Speaker of the House Paul Ryan (R-WI) said: "Now that Fidel Castro is dead, the cruelty and oppression of his regime should die with him. Today let us reflect on the memory and sacrifices of all those who have suffered under the Castros." Cruz and Rubio later said, respectively: "What the Obama administration has done has strengthened Raúl Castro. Raúl is the dictator now. You know, I asked my dad at dinner last night, well, what do you think happens now that Fidel is dead? And he shrugged and said Raúl's been in charge for years, that this is — the system has gotten stronger;" and "[h]e has made very clear that he felt that the moves President Obama has made toward Cuba were wrong and that he would examine them and change the ones that needed to be changed. And I think that's very promising. I know they've had good people advising them on this issue, as well. So I certainly have confidence that he's going to do the right thing when it comes to Cuba."
  - Cuban-American Mayor of Miami-Dade County Carlos A. Gimenez wrote that he hoped for a "free and democratic Cuba" and that "his passing closes a very painful chapter for Cubans..."
  - Puerto Rico – Governor Alejandro Garcia Padilla wrote: "Commander Fidel Castro Ruz, regardless of how we evaluate his work, was a leading figure in the history of Cuba, the Caribbean and America. His death is an opportunity to reflect on the content, meaning and significance of it in its national, regional, hemispheric and global dimensions. It also calls, and more importantly to imagine, a future that contains the reconciliation in democracy of the Cuban family and the acceptance of the complete incorporation of the island to the hemispheric system..."
  - Former president Jimmy Carter offered his "sympathies with the Castro family and the Cuban people" and said that he "remember[s] fondly our visits with him in Cuba and his love of his country."
  - Former Speaker of the House Newt Gingrich wrote: "Under no circumstance should President Obama or VP Biden or Secstate [sic] Kerry go to Cuba for Castro's funeral. He was a tyrant."
  - Former Assistant Secretary of the Treasury Paul Craig Roberts asked: "Did The Cuban Revolution Die With Castro?" He responded to the celebrations in Miami in saying: "The purpose of the US embargo on the Cuban Revolution was to prevent socialist development in order that when the revolutionaries die off, the American One Percent and crime syndicates can again purchase Cuba and resume the exploitation of the Cuban people."
  - President-elect Donald Trump initially wrote: "Fidel Castro is dead!" He later issued a statement that read:
    "Today, the world marks the passing of a brutal dictator who oppressed his own people for nearly six decades. Fidel Castro's legacy is one of firing squads, theft, unimaginable suffering, poverty and the denial of fundamental human rights.
    While Cuba remains a totalitarian island, it is my hope that today marks a move away from the horrors endured for too long, and toward a future in which the wonderful Cuban people finally live in the freedom they so richly deserve.
    Though the tragedies, deaths and pain caused by Fidel Castro cannot be erased, our administration will do all it can to ensure the Cuban people can finally begin their journey toward prosperity and liberty. I join the many Cuban Americans who supported me so greatly in the presidential campaign, including the Brigade 2506 Veterans Association that endorsed me, with the hope of one day soon seeing a free Cuba."
  - The vice-president-elect, Governor Mike Pence of Indiana wrote: "The tyrant #Castro is dead. New hope dawns. We will stand with the oppressed Cuban people for a free and democratic Cuba. Viva Cuba Libre!" (Long Live Free Cuba)
- Uruguay – President Tabaré Vázquez conveyed his condolences to the government, the family of Castro and the Cuban people "in the face of this sad event." Uruguay announced a day of national mourning on 27 November.
  - Former president José Pepe Mujica praised Castro as someone who "lived as he believed and lived for what he believed in;" someone with a "Quixotic stature, for he had to live a long period of his history [sic] defying the first world power he had in front of him."
- Venezuela – President Nicolás Maduro wrote: "To all the revolutionaries of the world, we have to continue his legacy and his flag of independence, of socialism, of homeland." He added: "He made history together with the peoples of the world to signal a way of dignity...Great history with the principles of Bolivar and Martí...Fidel and Chávez constructed el ALBA, PetroCaribe and left the path of liberation of our peoples...the history absolved." He also said: "I just talked with President Raúl Castro to send the solidarity and love to the people of Cuba before the passing of Commander Fidel Castro."

Asia

- Armenia – President Serzh Sargsyan sent a condolence letter stating that: "The role and significance of Fidel Castro in the modern history of Cuba is, indeed, hard to overestimate. This is a bereavement for the people of Cuba who sincerely loved and respected him. Remaining faithful to his ideologies and principles until the end and preserving the brave and noble qualities, Fidel Castro will continue inspiring and guiding new generations of Cuba."
- Azerbaijan – President Ilham Aliyev sent a letter to Raúl Castro expressing condolences and praising Castro as an "outstanding statesman and political figure."
- Bangladesh – President Abdul Hamid called Castro's death an "immense loss" and praised his "revolutionary fight to champion the oppressed." Prime Minister Sheikh Hasina also expressed deep condolences and remembered Castro's support for the Bangladeshi War of Independence, for which he had received the Bangladesh Liberation War Honour.
- China – General Secretary of the Chinese Communist Party Xi Jinping issued a statement that read: "The Chinese people have lost a good and true comrade. Comrade Castro will live forever. [Castro was] a great man of our time [and] history and people will remember him." He added that relations between the two states grew because of Castro after diplomatic ties were established in 1960. It further noted that Xi "visited his old friend Fidel Castro" in July 2014. Premier Li Keqiang also issued a statement that read Castro had "devoted his life to the liberation and national development of Cuba" and praised his contributions to Sino-Cuban relations. On 29 November, Xi Jinping paid a visit to the Cuban embassy to mourn Castro. Premier Li, Congress Chairman Zhang Dejiang, Conference Chairman Yu Zhengsheng and former General Secretary Jiang Zemin and Hu Jintao also offered wreaths.
- Georgia – President Giorgi Margvelashvili offered his condolences and called Castro a "remarkable leader, who strived for the welfare and advancement of his country in the most challenging period of the world history. I truly believe that his extraordinary legacy will leave a remarkable trace in the history of Cuba and the entire world."
- India – President Pranab Mukherjee wrote on Twitter: "Heartfelt condolences on sad demise of Cuba's revolutionary leader, former President & friend of India, Fidel Castro." Vice President Hamid Ansari praised Castro as "a champion of anti-imperialism and anti-colonialism, he served as an inspiration for socialists movements and anti-colonial struggle across the world." Prime Minister Narendra Modi also wrote on Twitter that he extended "deepest condolences to the Government & people of Cuba" and that "[w]e stand in support...in this tragic hour." He further noted that "India mourns the loss of a great friend." Speaker of the Lok Sabha Sumitra Mahajan said Castro was a figure of "sheer charisma and iron will." She also praised his contributions to the Non Aligned Movement and his support for India. Both houses of the parliament observed a minute of silence in tribute to Castro.
  - Indian National Congress President Sonia Gandhi expressed condolences to the Cuban people and noted Castro's "contribution to the Non Aligned Movement and his unflinching support for India's cause on various fora," which she added "will be remembered forever."
  - Communist Party of India (Marxist) General-Secretary Sitaram Yechury said: "Fidel Castro will remain a legend and a source of inspiration. The world will miss him."
- Indonesia – President Joko Widodo offered his condolences to the government and people of Cuba. Vice President Jusuf Kalla also extended his condolences, calling Castro "[Former President] Bung Karno's best friend who struggled for the non-aligned movement. Both were fighters."

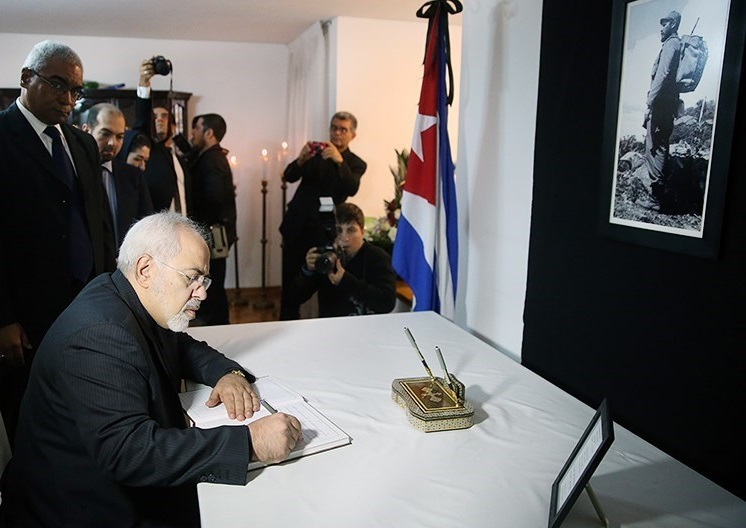
Iranian Foreign Minister Mohammad Javad Zarif signs memorial book for condolence in Cuban's embassy in Tehran.

- Iran – President Hassan Rouhani extended his condolences to the Cuban government and the country, as well as to Latin American people in general. He send a message to his Cuban counterpart saying the death of the "indefatigable combatant and leader of Cuba's Revolution" caused him deep sorrow and grief. "At a time that the world's oppressed nations are suffering from the violation of the most basic and fundamental human principles such as peace, justice and freedom, there are fortunately noble men and combatants who do not give up the struggle until the last days of their lives to raise the justice- and freedom-seeking flag." Foreign Minister Mohammad Javad Zarif said: "I offer my condolences to the resilient and revolutionary Cuban government and nation over the demise of Fidel Castro, the leader of Cuba's Revolution who was a unique figure in the fight against colonialism and exploitation and was an icon of independence-seeking fights of the oppressed nations." A few days later, he, along with the Cuban Ambassador to Iran Andres Gonzalez Quesada, said: "Commander Fidel's struggles against imperial powers will live on in history forever. [Castro] had an unparalleled role in pursuit of freedom, fight against arrogance, and quest for independence in Latin America. The Iranian government and people will always stand by the friendly Cuban government and people." He added that Castro's death was a "catastrophe for the world's freedom-seeking movements, especially in the Latin American region." He further recalled Rouhani's visit in which he communicated concerns about Cuba and the Third World, as well as urging Third World unity against "arrogant powers."
- Japan – Prime Minister Shinzo Abe offered his condolences and called Castro a "prominent leader." He added that "I remember vividly of him talking passionately on global affairs. On behalf of the Japanese government, I offer my condolences to the Cuban government, its people and his family members."
  - Association for Friendship between Japan and Cuba head Keiji Furuya said that Castro's loss was "truly unfortunate."
  - Komeito leader Natsuo Yamaguchi expressed regret.
  - Japanese Communist Party leader Kazuo Shii said: "He made significant contributions to building his country with a focus on medical care and education without yielding to unreasonable economic sanctions by the United States."
- Kazakhstan – President Nursultan Nazarbayev said: "I received with deep regret the sad news of the death of the leader of the Cuban Revolution, Fidel Castro. The Kazakh people will always remember Commander Fidel Castro as a wise ruler, as well as a politician of great influence, who has done immense work to strengthen bilateral cooperation and as a historical personality. In this difficult moment, sharing the irreparable pain, on behalf of the people of Kazakhstan and on my own, I express my deepest condolences to the friendly people of Cuba."
- Kuwait – Emir Sheikh Sabah Al-Ahmad Al-Jaber Al-Sabah sent his condolences to Raúl Castro and described the Castro as "one of the most emblematic leaders with the longest service in the world."
- Kyrgyzstan – President Almazbek Atambayev said: "With deep sadness I have received the news of the death of the outstanding Cuban man, the great Commander Fidel Castro. It is a very serious and irreplaceable loss for all the people of Cuba. Fidel Castro has made a significant contribution to the process of formation and development in Cuba. It is engraved in memory as the leader of the Cuban Revolution and a historical person of world scale. Let all people of Cuba receive my sincere condolences."
- Laos – General Secretary of the Lao People's Revolutionary Party Bounnhang Vorachit and other government officials sent a letter to Raúl Castro expressing their "deepest condolences and sympathy to Comrade and through you to the party, the government and the Cuban fraternal people." The note further read: "The passing of Comrade Fidel Castro Ruz is of a great loss to the Cuban Revolutionary Party, Government and the Cuban Fraternal People and it is indeed a great loss to the Lao Revolution Party, Government and the Lao people."
- Lebanon – President Michel Aoun sent a telegram to Raúl Castro noting Castro's "mark on the world's conscience thanks to his long experience, his power to persuade and the esteem with which he was beheld."
- Malaysia – Prime Minister Najib Razak expressed his condolences to the people of Cuba. He also wrote on Facebook: "Despite huge pressure, he stayed true to his principles until the very end – an icon of the non-aligned movement".
- Maldives – President Abdulla Yameen expressed his regret at the death of Castro, the "founder of modern Cuba and revolutionary leader who made immense contributions to the development and well-being of the Cuban people."
- Mongolia – Foreign Minister Tsendiyn Munkh-Orgil visited the Cuban embassy in Ulaanbaatar to express condolences for Castro's passing and conveyed those from the State Great Khural.
- North Korea – Supreme Leader Kim Jong-un was quoted by the official Korean Central News Agency as saying that in a message to Raúl Castro: "Though he passed away, the precious feats he performed will remain forever in the hearts of the peoples of our two countries and the hearts of progressive mankind." He further noted that Castro "made distinguished contributions to accomplishing the cause of independence against imperialism" and "established the socialist system where the people became the genuine masters for the first time in the Western Hemisphere." Kim expressed his conviction "that the revolutionary Cuban people would overcome the pain they suffer from the loss of their distinguished leader and certainly build the prospering ideal society of the people and achieve the victory of the socialist cause under the wise leadership of you, Comrade Raúl Castro Ruz, true to the lifetime intention of Comrade Fidel Castro Ruz."
- Pakistan – Tehreek-e-Insaaf convener Imran Khan wrote on Twitter following the news: "Today the world lost an iconic revolutionary leader Fidel Castro who liberated his nation from all vestiges of imperialism," "Castro reasserted the Cuban nation's dignity & self worth that withstood US aggression & became a global ldr [sic] for anti colonial struggles" and that "[w]e in Pakistan will always remember with gratitude Cuba's support on the ground in the aftermath of the 2005 earthquake."
- Palestine – President Mahmoud Abbas expressed his deepest condolences over the death of the historic leader of the Cuban Revolution, Fidel Castro. In a message to Cuban president Raúl Castro, Abbas noted Fidel Castro's role as a man 'devoted to the defense of his land and his people (...), truth and justice. In his letter, the Palestinian leader noted how Fidel Castro, leading the Cuban government, has always supported the Palestinian cause, particularly with his decision to cut diplomatic relations between Cuba and Israel, and the acknowledgement of the Palestinian Liberation Organization (PLO) during the fourth meeting of the Non-Aligned Movement in 1973 in Algiers. Palestinian National Council leader Salim al-Zanuan released a statement that highlighted the close relationship between Yasser Arafat and Castro.
  - The PFLP issued a statement that read Castro had united workers and peasants and turned Cuba into "an example of the nationalization of production, the division of wealth, and the construction of exceptional free education and health care systems. From Angola to South Africa, Palestine to Mozambique, Bolivia to El Salvador, Castro's legacy of international revolutionary solidarity and struggle continues to serve as an example in practice that transcends borders toward revolution, democracy and socialism."
  - Palestinian Democratic Union Secretary-General Zahira Kamal expressed sadness.
  - Democratic Front for the Liberation of Palestine Secretary-General Nayif Hawatmeh said: "The departure of the comrade, the leader, the friend, the great revolutionary, the patriot, and the nationalist Fidel Castro is a great loss for all revolutionaries and nationalist forces around the world."
- Philippines – Secretary of Communications of the Presidency Martin Andanar described Castro as a revolutionary icon. According to The Manila Times, he said the administration of President Rodrigo Duterte admires the legacy of Castro who "reaffirmed the dignity and self-esteem of his nation, was opposed to the West and to capitalism. Thanks to his leadership, Cuba is one of the few societies left intact by mercantilism. As the nation's father, Fidel Castro focused on health, education and literacy." He added that both states had excellent relations in the fields of culture, sport, agriculture and biotechnology.
- Singapore – President Tony Tan Keng Yam wrote, in a letter of condolence, to Raúl Castro: "During his time as Prime Minister, and then President, His Excellency Fidel Castro Ruz made significant contributions to Cuba and the Cuban people, particularly in the provision of public healthcare and education. His patriotism and single-minded dedication to Cuba never faltered. His passing is a deep loss to the people of Cuba."
- South Korea – The Ministry of Foreign Affairs of South Korea expressed its condolences on the death of Fidel Castro on 28 November, expressed its condolences to the Cuban government and people, and expressed its wish for Cuba to achieve continuous development and prosperity.
- Ba'athist Syria – President Bashar al-Assad sent a letter to Raúl Castro praising his brother's legacy in that he "led his people and his country's struggle against imperialism and hegemony for decades." Assad maintained that "Cuba, a friendly country, was able thanks to its leaders to resist against the toughest sanctions and most unjust campaigns in our modern history." He added that "[t]he name Fidel Castro will live forever in the minds of generations and remain an inspiration for all the peoples who aspire to achieve real independence and liberation from the yoke of colonialism and hegemony."
- Timor-Leste – An unnamed branch of the government, on behalf of the Timorese people, sent condolences to Raúl Castro and expressed solidarity with the Cuban people. The statement read that "it was where the Cuban aid to Timor-Leste was born, consistently characterised by a spirit of mutual respect, friendship and goodwill. Castro was an inspiration for many Timorese people during the struggle for self-determination and was a resolute champion of Timor-Leste's development after the restoration of independence."
- Turkey – The Foreign Ministry sent condolences to the Cuban people, and relatives and friends of Fidel Castro, noting Castro's visit to Istanbul for the 1996 Habitat II conference and praised his stance "against global injustice and [work] towards the establishment of a more egalitarian and solidarist world."
- Vietnam – The government and the Communist Party issued a statement that read: "Vietnamese leaders and people are deeply mournful upon hearing the news that Fidel Castro, a great leader of the Cuban people, an unyielding communist and revolutionary leader of Latin American nations and the struggle movement for peace and national independence, freedom and socialism, died on November 25." It characterised Castro as a "close brother and comrade of the Vietnamese leaders and people" who brought the Cuban people "to the era of independence and freedom since January 1959" and "always stood side by side with Vietnam during its past struggle for national independence and reunification as well as current national development." It added that "Cuban communists and people will continue to unite under the leadership of the Communist Party of Cuba and President Raúl Castro to realise the wishes of late leader Fidel Castro, firmly safeguarding the national independence and sovereignty as well as building socialism."

Europe

- Belarus – President Alexander Lukashenko said that Castro had "turned into a politician of planetary scale who has exerted a substantial influence in the evolution of world events in the 20th century and in the long term. [...] The reflections and advice he has shared with me have a great value, [and] I am sure it is a priceless treasure that will continue being of help for me in public management and in private life." He also called Castro "a thinker that has no replacement nowadays."
- Belgium – Prime Minister Charles Michel suggested that Castro's death marked a historic moment as "a definite end to the Cold War which divided populations to such a great extent last century." He added: "I hope Fidel Castro's political career can be studied properly to enable future generations not to favour closing in on themselves, which would have heavy consequences for the peoples of the world."
  - Workers' Party of Belgium Spokesman Raoul Hedebouw mourned the passing of "a symbol of the struggle of oppressed peoples for independence, health and education."
- Czech Republic – The Ministry of Foreign Affairs noted that "our opinion on political processes differed in many cases" but it also offered condolences to Castro's family while saying "former President Castro was an important figure, whose influence was felt not only across the Latin American region."
  - Communist Party of Bohemia and Moravia leader Vojtěch Filip sent condolences to the Castro's family who was the "president and fighter for freedom of Cuban people."
- Denmark – Foreign Minister Kristian Jensen issued a statement that read: "I hope his death can start a freedom revolution in Cuba. Any demise is sad. In this case I believe that it can bring something good."
- France – President François Hollande issued a statement that read: "Fidel Castro was a figure of the 20th century. He incarnated the Cuban revolution, in the hopes that it aroused, then in the disillusionments it provoked. An actor in the Cold War, he was part of an era that ended with the collapse of the Soviet Union. He succeeded in representing for Cubans the pride of rejecting external domination." It added that "France, which condemned human rights abuses in Cuba, had equally challenged the US embargo on Cuba, and France was glad to see the two countries re-establish dialogue and open ties between themselves."
  - French Communist Party leader Pierre Laurent said that Castro had "liberated his people in 1959, at a time when the island was in some ways the brothel and the casino of rich Americans. Then he faced American imperialism… He was one of the leaders of the movement of human emancipation in the 20th century. The revolution he led took place at the time of decolonisation and was part of this movement to restore the sovereignty of peoples. That is what will remain in history."
- Germany – After a few days, Steffen Seibert, spokesman for Chancellor Angela Merkel, issued a statement that described Castro as "a historic figure," but also accused him of having placed Cuba and its people "under a system of political repression for decades." He added: "Freedom of expression, human rights and democracy were not part of Fidel Castro's ideas."
- Greece – Prime Minister Alexis Tsipras wrote: "Goodbye, commandante. Until the peoples' eternal victory."
- Holy See – Pope Francis said that reports of Castro's death were "sad news" and that "I express to you my sentiments of grief."

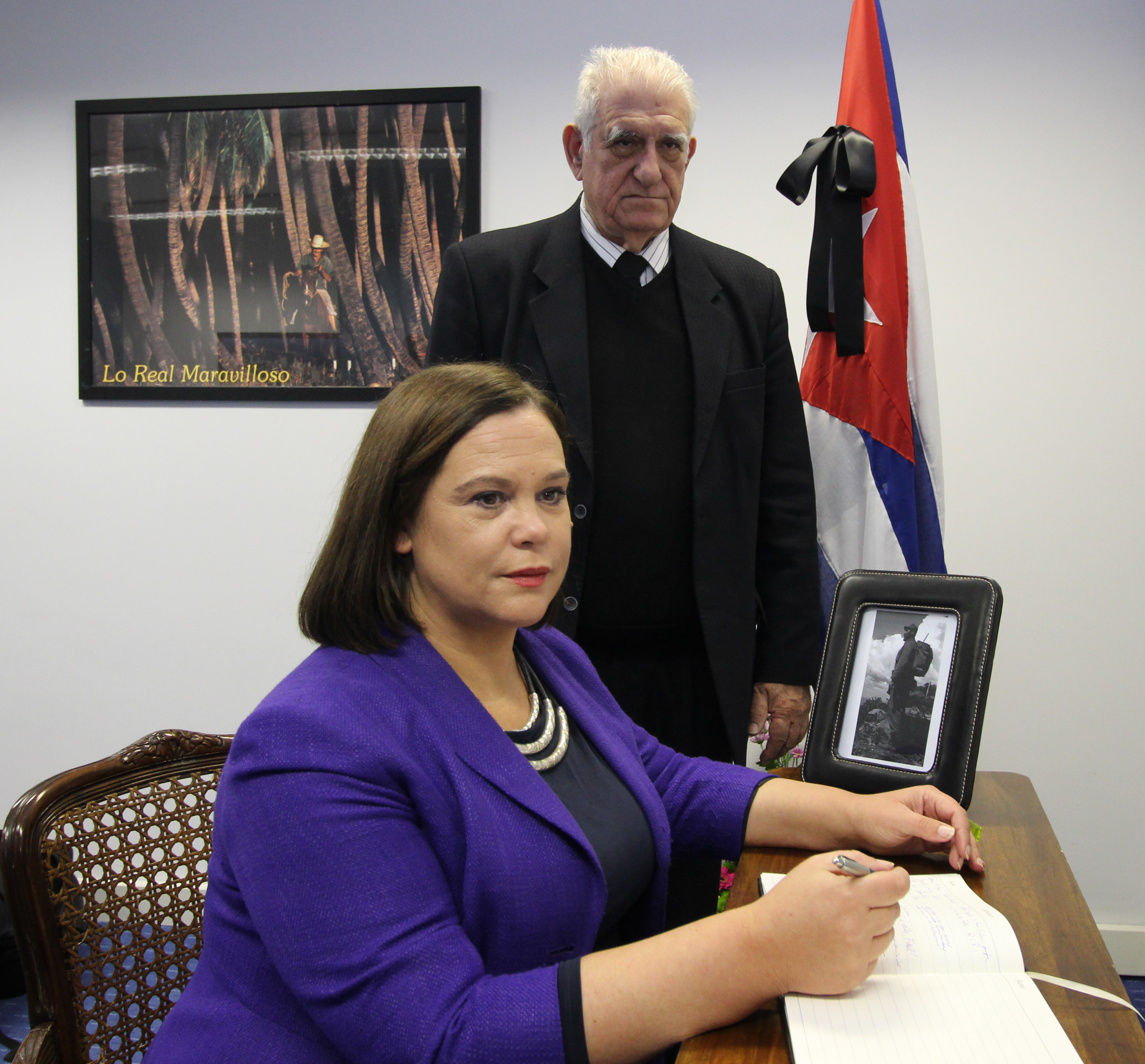
Sinn Féin Vice President Mary Lou McDonald signing the book of condolence to Fidel Castro at the Cuban Embassy in Dublin

- Ireland – President Michael D. Higgins issued a statement that read Castro had guided Cuba "through a remarkable process of social and political change, advocating a development path that was unique and determinedly independent. Fidel Castro will be remembered as a giant among global leaders whose view was not only one of freedom for his people but for all of the oppressed and excluded peoples on the planet."

Members of the Fine Gael-led government distanced themselves from Higgins' views while defending his right to express them. Foreign Minister Charles Flanagan said: "While his legacy is a complex one, Fidel Castro was a major figure in twentieth century history and his death marks the end of an era."
- However, Higgins' statement was criticised by Fianna Fáil, Amnesty International, Mattie McGrath, Ciarán Cannon, Rónán Mullen, and Renua. A spokesman for the President denied any lack of balance, pointing to a sentence in the statement: "The economic and social reforms introduced were at the price of a restriction of civil society, which brought its critics."
- The Dáil Éireann did not allow time for statements on Castro's death: Sinn Féin, AAA–PBP and Thomas Pringle were in favour of time, whereas the government, Fianna Fáil and Mattie McGrath were opposed.
- The Lord Mayor of Dublin Brendan Carr, opened a book of condolences at the Mansion House
- Sinn Féin President Gerry Adams wrote: "Fuair Fidel bas RIP" ("Fidel died RIP"). He also posted a picture of himself alongside Castro. Upon arriving at Castro's funeral, he said: "I'm here because Fidel was a good friend to Ireland."
- The Workers' Party expressed "deep sadness" at the death of its "comrade".
- The Communist Party of Ireland said "Fidel Castro, "commander in chief of the Cuban Revolution," was an outstanding revolutionary leader who not alone led his people to victory but became a symbol of resistance for colonised nations and millions of oppressed people. The Cuban Revolution inspired national liberation movements around the world."

- Italy – President Sergio Mattarella stated that "he was deeply sad when he was informed of the death of a protagonist of the history of his country and of the life of the world." He added that Castro "will remain alive in the memory of the Cuban people, to which Italy is all bound together by deep feelings and old friendship." Foreign Minister Paolo Gentiloni said that "with the death of Castro a great and dramatic story of the 20th century ends." He added that Italy is "close to the Cuban people who looks to the future."
- Moldova – President-elect Igor Dodon published a statement that read: "Fidel Castro was an emblem of the 20th century. He was a great leader and a true patriot of his country. His name will remain inscribed in world history, and his character will inspire other new leaders in the coming decades, in their struggle for independence. Hasta siempre, comandante!"
- Netherlands – While deploring the "serious human rights violations" under his government, Prime Minister Mark Rutte stated: "Fidel Castro wrote world history. He spans in person a period from the Cuban missile crisis to the historic handshake between his brother and president Obama". He referred to him as "one of the striking faces of the 20th century". Foreign Affairs Minister Bert Koenders described Castro as "a leader of historic proportions", but regretted the "dark side" of his government in terms of human rights.
- Poland – President Andrzej Duda sent a letter to his Cuban counterpart and expressed condolences for "the death of your brother and long-time leader of the Cuban people, Fidel Castro Ruz."
- Portugal – President Marcelo Rebelo de Sousa said: "At this moment I express my deepest condolences to President Raúl Castro and the Cuban people for the death of the former head of state, Commander Fidel Castro. I also remember the meeting we had a month ago, when we talked about the relations between Portugal and Cuba, and the perspectives that open to work in the economic, social and cultural, in a changing world."
- Russia – President Vladimir Putin praised Castro as a "symbol of an era" and also wrote in a telegram to Raúl Castro: "The name of this distinguished statesman is rightly considered the symbol of an era in modern world history. Fidel Castro was a sincere and reliable friend of Russia. [Castro has built a] free and independent Cuba [that] became an influential member of the international community and served as an inspiration for many countries and peoples. [He was ] strong and wise person who always looked to the future with confidence. He embodied the high ideals of a politician, a citizen and a patriot sincerely convinced of the rightness of the cause to which he dedicated his whole life. His memory will forever remain in the hearts of the citizens of Russia." Finally, he noted that Castro had made a "huge personal contribution" to bilateral relations. Prime Minister Dimitry Medvedev stated that "without exaggeration, a whole era of history is gone with Fidel Castro."
  - Communist Party First Secretary Gennady Zyuganov expressed his condolences and proclaimed that "Fidel Castro will remain an authority and example for all mankind" and "Russia must continue to help Cuba, which remained true to its friendship with Russia in the most difficult times."
  - Former Soviet President Mikhail Gorbachev said: "Fidel stood up and strengthened his country during the harshest American blockade, when there was colossal pressure on him and he still took his country out of this blockade to a path of independent development. In the past years, even when Fidel Castro was not formally in power, his role in strengthening the country was huge. [He should be remembered as a] prominent politician [who left a] deep mark in the history of mankind."
- Serbia – President Tomislav Nikolić sent a condolence telegram to Raúl Castro where he wrote: "With his departure, the Cuban nation has lost a prominent leader and fighter for freedom and independence of their country, and the world one of the last prominent statesmen of the 20th century. He was characterised by a freedom-loving spirit and a vision of the world based on freedom, equality and justice, but also determination and personal courage to fight for his ideals." He further defined Castro as "a historic figure during his lifetime and the symbol of an era."
- Slovakia – Prime Minister Robert Fico said: "Cuba has never threaten[ed] anyone, [it] just wanted to live its own life. Many hated it for that courage. I want to express condolences to Cuba in connection with the death of Fidel Castro – the bearer of that courage".
- Slovenia – President Borut Pahor and Miro Cerar sent condolences to Raúl Castro and the Castro family.
- Spain – King Felipe VI sent condolences to Raúl Castro and spoke of strong ties between the two states. "Fidel Castro is a figure of indisputable historical significance. That is why, at the moment, I want to particularly remember your family ties and ties with Spain. Once again, the great closeness between Cuba and Spain makes everything that affects Cuba feel like its own in Spain. With this affection shared by both peoples, Cuban and Spanish. The Foreign Ministry issued a statement that read: "A figure of great historic importance has gone, a man who brought about a turning point in the country's evolution and whose great influence was felt across the region. As the son of Spanish parents, former President Castro always maintained strong links with Spain and was bound by ties of blood and culture.
- Sweden – Minister for Foreign Affairs Margot Wallström described Castro as "a historical political leader," while also claiming that the "lack of democracy and human rights in Cuba" has been "an obstacle for the development of the country."
  - Former prime minister Carl Bildt wrote on Twitter: "With his revolution in 1959 Fidel Castro set up a still struggling Communist dictatorship. Neither a political nor an economic model. RIP."
- Switzerland – President Johann Schneider-Ammann sent a private telegram of condolence to Raúl Castro. Minister for Foreign Affairs Didier Burkhalter also expressed his condolences to the Cuban people and government and noted "positive elements" in Cuba's health and education systems, while suggesting there was "still much to be done" regarding economic reforms and human rights.
- Ukraine – President Petro Poroshenko wrote: "Fidel Castro has stepped into eternity. We may disagree with his views, but his charisma has defined the entire era. I ask the people of Cuba to accept my condolences. We will always remember the initiative of Fidel Castro, who felt the pain of Chernobyl and helped to bring back to life thousands of young Ukrainians."
- United Kingdom – Foreign Secretary Boris Johnson wrote: "Fidel #Castro's death marks the end of an era for #Cuba & the start of a new one for Cuba's people." The Foreign Office echoed Johnson's statement and also issued a statement that read: "The UK expresses its condolences to the government and people of Cuba, and to the former president's family...Fidel Castro's leadership of the 1959 Cuban Revolution marked him out as an historic if controversial figure. The UK will continue to work with the government of Cuba on a wide range of foreign policy priorities, including on human rights."
  - Leader of the Opposition Jeremy Corbyn called Castro "a massive figure in the history of the whole planet." He also praised Castro's "heroism" and commended the "social changes" to Cuba. "I think history will show that Castro was such a key figure, it seems he has been with us forever."
  - Deputy First Minister of Northern Ireland Martin McGuinness wrote: "End of an Era. #FidelCastro RIP #Sad."
  - Scotland – National Secretary of the Scottish Socialist Party Bill Bonnar wrote: "Castro's entire political life was given to the struggle for Cuban independence and the struggle for liberation and socialism all over the world. He may have died but his legacy will live and endure – because heroes live forever."
  - Former Trade Minister Brian Wilson said of Castro that he had sent out a "beacon of hope" to Latin America. "He educated his people and he gave them healthcare they had never had before, and you can admire all of that without being an uncritical supporter, believe me, but do not lose the bigger picture – that Fidel Castro, for his region and for oppressed people throughout the world, sent out a message of hope." He recalled to BBC Radio 4' Today of having met Castro on a trade mission: "He proposed a toast to Tony Blair and the third way, I proposed a toast to peace and socialism." Former cabinet minister and leader of the House of Commons Peter Hain said: "Although responsible for indefensible human rights and free speech abuses, Castro created a society of unparalleled access to free health, education and equal opportunity despite an economically throttling U.S.A. siege. His troops inflicted the first defeat on South Africa's troops in Angola in 1988, a vital turning point in the struggle against apartheid." Former London Mayor Ken Livingstone called Castro an "absolute giant of the 20th century." He also told Today: "I'm sure they will, over time, move towards something like a traditional west European democracy. It could have happened a lot earlier if you hadn't had, the entire time, a blockade by America, attempts to overthrow the regime, eight assassination attempts authorised by American presidents." He further commented that "even if Trump goes a little bit bonkers.... Of course Fidel did things that were wrong.... Initially he wasn't very good on lesbian and gay rights, but the key things that mattered was that people had a good education, good healthcare and wealth was evenly distributed. He was not living as a billionaire laundering money off into a Panamanian bank account or anything like that, he was good for the people."
  - The leader of UK Independence Party, Nigel Farage was more critical of Castro, stating that he was "proof that state socialism make people poorer and make the world a more dangerous place".

Oceania

- Australia – Prime Minister Malcolm Turnbull declined to make a formal statement. Speaking instead for the government, frontbench Senator Mathias Cormann described Fidel Castro as a "significant but controversial figure." He added: "The policies and actions he pursued, in our judgment, weren't in the best interests of the Cuban people. Certainly his hostility towards the West, in particular the United States, we believe imposed significant hardship on the Cuban people".
- New Zealand – Prime Minister John Key issued no formal statement, but responded informally to media queries by saying: "There's no question he repressed a lot of people and was a very polarising figure, and you can see those people that have been exiles living in Miami fundamentally rejoicing the fact that the guy has passed away."
- Papua New Guinea – Prime Minister Peter O'Neill, who had completed a state visit to Cuba just hours before Fidel Castro's death, said: "Regardless of the politics of the time, such as the Cold War in relation to Cuba, […] when a warrior passes it is time to pay homage to the person who stood by their convictions. The legacy that Fidel Castro leaves for the world is far-reaching. Outside the politics, Fidel Castro pioneered the development of pharmaceuticals and healthcare services in his country and these are being extended around the world. On behalf of the Government and the people of Papua New Guinea, I extend our sincere condolences to the Castro family for your loss, the passing of a great man of conviction."
- Vanuatu – Former prime minister Barak Sope recalled Cuba's support for Vanuatu's independence in the late 1970s and remarked: "[W]ithout Cuba and President Fidel Castro, it may have taken longer or never for this country to become an Independent State […] Today, I am sad to say that Vanuatu has lost its first political pillar of our political freedom, the late President Fidel Castro. Personally, and of course the country has lost a man that stood up for the right of the political freedom of our nation and people in international forum and the United Nations. We truly miss him.".

=== Others ===
During the early hours of 26 November, the Cuban-American diaspora in Little Havana, Miami, as well as in Hialeah, Florida, also had celebrations amongst the thousands of exiles. In San Francisco, California, the diasporic reaction was more mixed. Cuban-American celebrities commented on Castro's death, including: Jose Canseco, who wrote he "[c]an't say I feel anything for his death. There is a reason many defected to USA;" and Gloria Estefan, who stated that the event marks "the symbolic death of the destructive ideologies that he espoused that, I believe, is filling the Cuban exile community with renewed hope and a relief that has been long in coming." Castro's death became public too late for eastern U.S. newspapers' print editions, but CNN covered Raúl Castro's announcement as breaking news. The Herald posted online its long-ready obituary, written in 2001.

Nobel Peace Prize laureate Adolfo Pérez Esquivel said: "From the roots of Our America Fidel left for eternity. Liberator, apostle, humanist, friend…" His fellow Nobel laureate Rigoberta Menchú said: "Our revolution is humanist because it humanises man." Former Argentine footballer Diego Maradona stated that Castro was a "great" man and that, while he was away for the 2016 Davis Cup in Croatia: "[t]hey called me from Buenos Aires and it was a shock. I'm terribly sad as he was like a second father."

Minoru Hataguchi, who led Castro through the Hiroshima Peace Memorial Museum as its director, said Castro sympathised with the ordeal of hibakusha. He quoted Castro as having said: "Che Guevara told me to go to Hiroshima. I'm glad I came." He added that Castro "sympathised with the people of Hiroshima and his death is unfortunate." He further noted that Castro's questions "showed his character, that he was trying to understand the agonies of the hibakusha." Masakazu Masukawa, another hibakusha who had met Castro during a visit to Cuba in 2012 recalled that Castro "was a person of influence. If he had called on the world to abandon nuclear weapons early on, momentum might have grown bigger."

Chairman of the Human Rights Foundation Garry Kasparov wrote: "Fidel Castro was one of the 20th century's many monsters. We should lament only that he had so long to inflict misery on Cuba and beyond." Amnesty International's Americas Director Erika Guevara-Rosas issued a statement that described Castro as a "progressive but deeply flawed leader." It cited: "Access to public services such as health and education for Cubans were substantially improved by the Cuban revolution and for this, his leadership must be applauded. However, despite these achievements in areas of social policy, Fidel Castro's 49-year reign was characterised by a ruthless suppression of freedom of expression... Fidel Castro's legacy is a tale of two worlds. The question now is what human rights will look like in a future Cuba. The lives of many depend on it."

== See also ==
- Che Guevara Mausoleum
- Death and state funeral of Hugo Chávez
- Death and state funeral of Nelson Mandela
- Death and state funeral of Nestor Kirchner
- Lenin's Mausoleum
