= Cuba–European Union relations =

- European Union: Cuba

Cuba–European Union relations are the international relations between the Republic of Cuba and the common foreign policy and trade relations of the European Union (EU). Relations have been strained in recent years, due to Cuba's poor human rights record and the European Union's numerous accusations of Cuba's human rights abuses.

== EU's common position ==
EU relations with Cuba was governed by the Common Position, as approved by the European Council of Ministers in 1996, which was updated every six months following regular evaluations. According to the Common Position "the objective of the European Union in its relations with Cuba is to encourage a process of transition to a pluralist democracy and respect for human rights and fundamental freedoms, as well as sustainable recovery and improvement in the living standards of the Cuban people". Cuba rejects the Common Position as interference in its internal affairs. There is an EU Delegation in Havana that works under the responsibility of the EC Delegation in Santo Domingo, Dominican Republic. The Common Position was repealed on 12 December 2016.

== Cocktail wars ==
In response to the Cason affair of March 2003, when the government of Cuba arrested dozens of journalists, librarians, and human rights activists, the EU took measures, which were publicly announced on 5 June 2003 to limit high level governmental visits. The EU reduced the profile of member states' participation in cultural events and invited Cuban dissidents to National Day celebrations. The Cuban authorities announced on 26 July 2003 their refusal of all direct aid coming from the European Union. This period of diplomatic friction became known as the Cocktail Wars.

On 31 January 2005, the EU decided that all the measures taken on 5 June 2003 would be suspended temporarily. The Council stated once again that the EU remains willing to maintain a constructive dialogue with the Cuban authorities aiming at tangible results in the political, economic, human rights and cooperation sphere. Furthermore, it decided that the EU will develop more intense relations with the peaceful political opposition and broader layers of civil society in Cuba, through enhanced and more regular dialogue. The temporary suspension of these measures was confirmed in June 2005.

== Recent ==
On 11 May 2009, Czech Foreign Minister Jan Kohout, who represented the EU at a meeting with Cuba had stated that Cuba had made no headway in human rights. Cuban Foreign Minister Bruno Rodríguez Parrilla defended Havana's record stating that the EU position was obsolete. Although the EU lifted economic sanctions against the nation in 2008, it reviews the situation annually.

After the death of another dissident in Cuba in March 2010, the European Parliament put forward a resolution against Cuba and calling for the release of political prisoners. Meanwhile, Spain, currently holding the EU Council presidency had been working to normalise relations, claiming that the common position had failed to produce change in Cuba.

On 10 February 2014, the EU adopted negotiating directives for a bilateral EU-Cuba Political Dialogue and Cooperation Agreement. The talks started in April 2014 in Havana. They were followed up during a second round in Brussels in August 2014 and a third round in Havana in March 2015. On 11 March 2016, HR/VP Mogherini visited Cuba to sign the final deal and mark "the end of the common position".

On 12 December 2016, the EU repealed the Common Position and signed the Political Dialogue and Cooperation Agreement (PDCA).

== Trade ==
Cuba benefits from the Generalized System of Preferences (GSP) preferential treatment for its exports. Furthermore, despite being a member of the African, Caribbean and Pacific Group of States since 2000, Cuba does not benefit from the ACP-EU Sugar Protocol but from a sugar quota granted by the EU (some 59,000 tonnes per year; duty paid on this quota is €98 per tonne).

The EU is Cuba's second most important trading partner (accounting for 20% of total Cuban trade). The EU is the second biggest source of Cuban imports (20%) and was the third most important destination for Cuban exports (21%). The EU is Cuba's biggest external investor. Approximately one third of all tourists visiting the island every year come from the European Union.

== Cuba's foreign relations with EU member states ==
- Austria
- Belgium
- Bulgaria
- Croatia
- Cyprus
- Czech Republic
- Denmark
- Estonia
- Finland
- France
- Germany
- Greece
- Hungary
- (Republic of Ireland) Ireland
- Italy
- Latvia
- Lithuania
- Luxembourg
- Malta
- Netherlands
- Poland
- Portugal
- Romania
- Slovakia
- Slovenia
- Spain
- Sweden
