= Ireland–Latin America relations =

Ireland

Latin America

Ireland–Latin America relations are relations between Ireland and the countries of Latin America.

== History ==
=== Pre-21st century ===
Fewer migrants came to Latin America from Ireland than from other English-speaking countries, and they were also relatively less stably established in the region; even in Argentina, the main destination they went to, half went on to re-emigrate. They had different ways of contending with their conflicting connections to Irish, English, and Latin cultures; for example, Irish Latin Americans had more success than others when working with English and American companies that came to the region. Most of these migrants came before the high levels of European migration to the Americas that occurred at the turn of the 20th century.

One particular source of Irish migrants to Spanish America was Spain, which many of them had originally settled in due to religious persecution. The shared Catholic heritage of the Irish and Latin Americans combined with the conflicting nature of the Irish diaspora as participating in Spanish colonialism and helping to impose Christianity, yet also participating in local independence movements and introducing religious and intellectual changes that led to emancipatory movements. These same emancipatory Christian movements then influenced Ireland in turn during the 20th century.

=== 21st century ===
Ireland's trade with Latin America has increased significantly in recent years, with merchandise trade increasing by 40% to $5 billion from 2017 to 2022.

== Cultural relations ==
=== Sports ===
Historically, Irish migrants played a significant role in introducing sports like hurling to countries like Argentina.

== Ireland's foreign relations with Latin American countries ==
- Argentina–Ireland relations
- Bolivia–Ireland relations
- Brazil–Ireland relations
- Chile–Ireland relations
- Colombia–Ireland relations
- Costa Rica–Ireland relations
- Cuba–Ireland relations
- Dominican Republic–Ireland relations
- Ecuador–Ireland relations
- El Salvador–Ireland relations
- Guatemala–Ireland relations
- Honduras–Ireland relations
- Ireland–Mexico relations
- Ireland–Nicaragua relations
- Ireland–Panama relations
- Ireland–Paraguay relations
- Ireland–Peru relations
- Ireland–Uruguay relations
- Ireland–Venezuela relations
