= Cocktail Wars =

Diplomatic crisis between the EU and Cuba

The Cocktail Wars were a series of diplomatic conflicts between the European Union and Cuba. The wars began in 2003 when EU member states invited dissidents to official receptions at their Cuban embassies. This sparked Cuba to cut off diplomatic relations with the EU. A compromise was eventually reached.

== Beginning ==
The conflict started in 2003 after European embassies in Cuba made a policy to invite dissidents to diplomatic receptions in the Cuban capital Havana. All EU countries pledge to do this on their national day celebrations, such as to the French embassy on Bastille Day and to the British embassy for the Queen's birthday.

This move was in protest at Cuba's decision to imprison 75 dissidents and to execute 3 hijackers. The Cuban government, which calls its dissidents "mercenaries in the pay of the United States", took this as an insult and cut off almost all diplomatic relations with all European Union ambassadors and their embassies despite few dissidents willing to risk turning up to the events.

== Agreement ==
In 2004, Cuba released 14 of the dissidents and an EU working group on Latin America recommended the policy be changed instead to promoting more discreet contacts with dissidents. After 20 months of tense relations, Brussels compromised by stating it would not ask Cubans to its diplomatic functions in future, be they dissidents or government ministers, rendering receptions useless as a diplomatic tool.

This was welcomed by Havana and on 4 January 2005 Cuba normalised relations with Austria, France, Germany, Greece, Italy, Portugal, Sweden and the United Kingdom. It had already normalised relations with Spain who led calls for normalised relations. Despite the agreement not to invite dissidents, the EU did make clear it would seek to strengthen contacts with opposition groups in the country.

== Criticism ==
However, the Netherlands and the Czech Republic were included as they had supported a hard line against Castro's regime, as did many other post-Communist EU states. Cuban dissidents also saw the compromise as the EU backing down over a very small act of protest. The Czech government stated it would ignore the agreement, saying it would invite whoever it wanted. Poland made similar remarks.

== See also ==
- Cuba–European Union relations
