= Magherini =

Magherini is an Italian surname. Notable people with the surname include:

- Graziella Magherini (1927–2023), Italian psychiatrist
- Guido Magherini (born 1951), Italian footballer and manager

== See also ==
- Mogherini
