= Cuba–Pakistan relations =

- Pakistan: Cuba

Cuba–Pakistan relations refers to the bilateral relations between Cuba and Pakistan. Cuba has an embassy in Islamabad and Pakistan has an embassy in Havana. Relations between the countries strengthened after Cuba provided humanitarian assistance to the victims of the 2005 Kashmir earthquake.

== Background ==
Diplomatic relations between the two countries were initially established on October 28, 1955. In 1963, Pakistan established an embassy in Cuba, with Cuba reciprocating. However, the embassy was closed in 1968 and reopened in 1980. But it was again closed in 1990 due to economic problems. From that time until 2005, the countries did not have any formal relations. It was only after the 2005 Kashmir earthquake when Cuba sent humanitarian aid to the disaster victims that the opportunities were observed to re-established the diplomatic ties. Continued diplomatic relations between the two countries is quite recent. In 2006, both Cuba and Pakistan showed willingness to strengthen bilateral relations between the two countries. President of Pakistan Pervez Musharraf and Deputy Foreign Minister of Cuba Bruno Rodríguez Parrilla held a meeting on May 24, 2006, to discuss bilateral matters. During the meeting major general Farrukhseir deputy surgeon general Pakistan Army was also present. On November 1, 2006, Cuban ambassador to Pakistan Gustavo Machin Gomez announced in a press conference that Cuba and Pakistan have had diplomatic relations for last six months and that both the nations "want to improve these relations in all fields". In April 2008, the Federal Cabinet of Pakistan approved negotiations on the agreement between Havana and Islamabad to form Pakistan-Cuba Joint Economic Commission with the goal to expand economic cooperation between the two nations. The bilateral talks were also intended to enhance cooperation in the fields of agriculture, industry, food, higher education and science and technology.

== Cuban response to the Kashmir earthquake ==
After the 2005 Kashmir earthquake, Cuba sent over 2,400 physicians and paramedical staff and established 32 field hospitals and two relief camps in the North-West Frontier Province (NWFP) and Azad Jammu and Kashmir. A total of 36 transport flights were made. In addition to nurses, paramedics and doctors the initial two flights were only of military trained physicians. Tons of medical equipment and medicines were sent by the government of Cuba. Approximately 30 amputee patients were flown to Cuba for treatments. Pakistani president Pervez Musharraf expressed his contentment at the efforts of Fidel Castro and appreciated the services of the Cuban medical teams. From October, 2005 to January 24, 2006, Cuban medical teams performed 601,369 consultations, 5,925 surgeries including 2,819 major surgeries and served at 44 different locations in the quake-affected region.

A statement issued by the Ministry of Foreign Affairs said that "President Pervez Musharraf expressed profound gratitude of the government and people of Pakistan for the substantial assistance provided by Cuba in the relief and rehabilitation work". President Pervez Musharraf met Bruno Rodnguez parrilla deputy foreign minister of Cuba who paid farewell call on president in awan e sadar. During this meeting major general Farrukh seir deputy surgeon general pak Army was also present. The statement also stated that "the President said that Cuba's contribution to our relief efforts would always be remembered by the people of Pakistan".

Usman Zaheer Meer established a friendship Association with Cuba in 2006, namely Pak Cuba Friendship Association.

== Messages between two Heads of states ==
In 2007, Pervez Musharraf declared that the bilateral relations should be made stronger in coming years and paid respect to the Revolution Day on January 1. In a message to the then Cuban President Fidel Castro, Musharraf said:

On behalf of the government and people of Pakistan and my own behalf, it gives me immense pleasure to congratulate your excellency and the government and people of Cuba on the occasion of revolution day of the Republic of Cuba. I avail myself of this opportunity to convey to your excellency our best wishes for your speedy recovery and the continued progress and prosperity of the people of the Republic of Cuba.

After Raúl Castro became President of Cuba, Musharraf congratulated his presidency and sent a message to him:

On behalf of the people and Government of Pakistan, and on my own behalf, I wish to extend our warmest felicitations on your election as the President of the Republic of Cuba.

Your Excellency's elevation to this high office bears testimony to the trust and confidence reposed by the people of Cuba in your accomplished leadership and outstanding services.
Pakistan and Cuba share common ideals and perceptions for a better and more equitable world. I am confident that the existing friendly and cooperative ties between Pakistan and Cuba will continue to expand and deepen during your term of office.
I avail myself of this opportunity to wish every success in your endeavours for the continued progress and prosperity of the people of Cuba .

Please accept, Excellency, the assurances of my highest consideration.

== Education ==
In 2005 and 2006, the Higher Education Commission (HEC) sent 354 students to Cuba to study Medicine and Surgery on scholarship, which was offered by the Government of Cuba. Dr S.M. Raza of the HEC said that Cuba had provided Pakistan with 1,000 scholarships and the health care system in Cuba is better than in the United States. Cuban Ambassador Gustavo Machin Gomez said Pakistani students will receive the best medical education recognized by the World Health Organization (WHO) and will have complete religious and cultural freedom. He also pointed to the fact that it was for the first time that Muslim students will receive education in Cuba. Dr Mukhtar Ahmed of the HEC expressed gratitude to Cuba for offering these scholarships.

Both the countries have elaborated plans to improve the cooperation in higher education, especially in the field of biotechnology, which will include exchange of scientists, joint research programmes and collaboration between industries in Cuba and Pakistan. Dr. Atta-ur-Rahman, Chairman of the HEC in a meeting with Gomez proposed a joint investment plan to establish a post-graduate institute in Pakistan, the Centre of Excellence in Biotechnology, with the help of Cuba. This institute will have 100 PhD faculty members, more than 1000 students and with 20 Cuban scientists. Atta-ur-Rahman also emphasized to establish mutual cooperation between biotechnology institutes in Pakistan and Cuba. He requested Gomez to find partner institutes in Cuba for the National Institute of Biology and Genetic Engineering (NIBGE) in Faisalabad, Centre for Applied Molecular Biology (CAMB) in Lahore and Dr.Panjwani Centre for Molecular Medicine (PCMM) in Karachi.

== Sports ==
Baseball is the most played sport in Cuba and is strongly tied with Cuban identity. In recent years baseball in Pakistan is a rising sport with the national baseball team showing positive results at the international level regarded as the most promising emerging team from Asia. Cuba has offered Pakistan assistance in baseball coaching. Pakistan also occasionally hires Cuban boxing coaches for amateur boxing and sends Pakistani boxers to Cuba for training at Cuba's world renowned amateur boxing programs.

Field hockey is the national sport of Pakistan and Pakistan has offered Cuba help in hockey assistance and promotion.

== Trade ==
On March 15, 2007, Gomez IN a meeting with Shahid Hassan Sheikh and Yaqoob Tahir Izhar, President and Senior Vice President of the Lahore Chamber of Commerce and Industry (LCCI), expressed positive views over the potential of Pakistani rice, textile, leather and sports goods in the Cuban market and said that businesspeople from Pakistan will have this advantage through the assistance of the Cuban embassy in Pakistan. He added that for the purpose of making relations between the two nations stronger, the Chamber of Commerce and Industry in Cuba was willing to sign a Memorandum of understanding (MoU) with the LCCI. Gomez said that Cuba has good relations with Pakistan for 52 years and now businesspeople of Pakistan and Cuba should cooperate for the interest of both nations.

Hassan Sheikh gave Gomez complete assurance to strengthen bilateral relations and said that Pakistan is willing to export more textiles, cotton, optical photo, fish, vegetables, cereals, sugar, milling products, dairy products, sugar confectionery to Cuba in addition to electronic goods, leather products, pottery, furniture etc. and will import larger quantities of pharmaceutical products, inorganic chemicals and ores from the island nation.

== Military ==
In March 2008, ambassador Gustavo Machin Gomez met General Tariq Majid, the Chairman of Joint Chiefs of Staff Committee (CJCSC) at Joint Staff Headquarters and discussed issues related to military cooperation. Both of them expressed positive views over the increasing relations between the two nations and were optimistic that the bilateral cooperation will expand in different fields. Majid stressed that Pakistan has formed strong defence infrastructure both in defence production and in shape of military academies to provide help and cooperation to the Military of Cuba. He also said that both countries should use their capacity for expanding military cooperation.

== Gomez at IPS conference ==
In May 2008, while giving a speech at the Institute of Policy Studies (IPS) in Islamabad, Gomez said that 356 students from Pakistan had completed their first year study in Cuba and a next batch was in the process of being sent. Khurshid Ahmed, the chairman of the IPS, who was also a member of the Jamaat-e-Islami (JI), said that facing the United States, Pakistan "has something to learn from Cuba". He also said that anti-imperialism was the most significant aspect of the struggle of Cuba, declared "Cuba has shown it is possible for the weak to stand up and resist a superpower" and concluded "we are playing second fiddle to the US in its games. Pakistan has to delink from its slavish policy".
