= Mogherini =

Mogherini is an Italian surname. Notable people with the surname include:

- Federica Mogherini (born 1973), Italian politician
- Flavio Mogherini (1922–1994), Italian production designer, art director, and film director

== See also ==
- Magherini
