= Cuba–Poland relations =

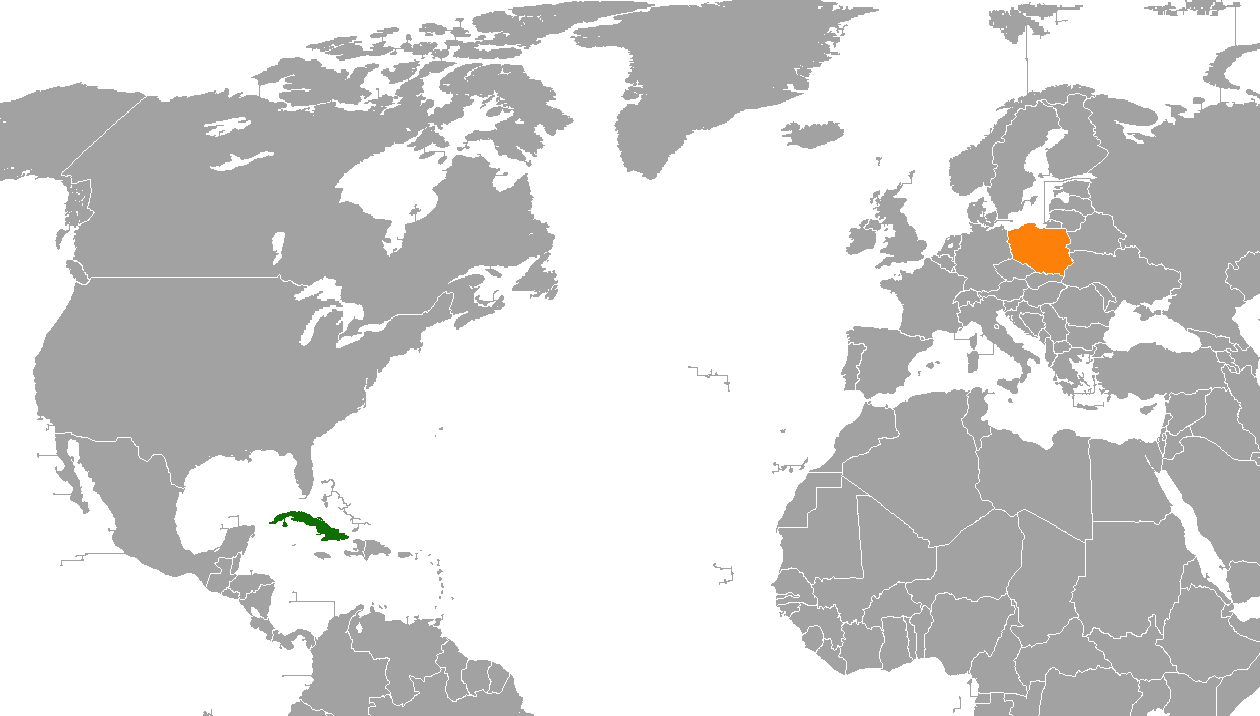

- Cuba: Poland

Cuba–Poland relations are the diplomatic relations between Cuba and Poland. Both nations are members of the United Nations.

== History ==
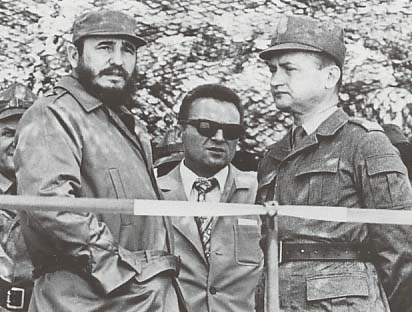
Cuban President Fidel Castro meeting with Polish Minister of National Defense Wojciech Jaruzelski in Warsaw, 1972.

One of the first Polish migrants to arrive to Cuba was Carlos Roloff who became a General in the Cuban War of Independence from Spain and fought alongside Cuban independence leader José Martí. Between 1920 and 1928, several hundred Polish families arrived in Cuba, however for most of the migrants, Cuba was a stop-over to the United States. Around this time, 10,000 Polish Jews arrived to Cuba. In 1927, the "Union of Polish People" was founded in Cuba to serve the Polish community in the island-nation.

In 1933, Cuba and Poland established diplomatic relations. After World War II, Poland adopted a communist system of governance. In January 1959, Fidel Castro took power in Cuba and began to establish ties with fellow communist nations. In 1960, both nations re-established diplomatic relations and in the same year, Cuba opened an embassy in Warsaw. In September 1960, President Fidel Castro met with Polish First Secretary Władysław Gomułka during the United Nations summit in New York City. In 1962, Polish Foreign Minister Adam Rapacki visited Cuba becoming the first highest ranking Polish official to visit the country.

In 1972, Cuban President Fidel Castro paid an official visit to Poland. In January 1975, the head of the Polish government, First Secretary Edward Gierek paid an official visit to Cuba. Cuba and Poland established strong diplomatic ties during the Cold War. Between 1962 and 1988 more than 35 thousand Cubans studied in Poland.

After the fall of communism in Poland in 1989, relations between the two nations nearly ceased as Poland diplomatically shifted to the United States. Between 1990 and 1995, most of the remaining Polish residents in Cuba returned to Poland or immigrated to the United States. In 2009, Poland's equality minister, Elżbieta Radziszewska proposed to expand a Polish law prohibiting the production of fascist and totalitarian propaganda including images of the Cuban revolutionary Ernesto "Che" Guevara. In June 2017, Polish Foreign Minister Witold Waszczykowski paid an official visit to Cuba, becoming the first high ranking Polish official to visit the country in over 30 years.

== High-level visits ==
High-level visits from Cuba to Poland

- President Fidel Castro (1972)

High-level visits from Poland to Cuba

- Foreign Minister Adam Rapacki (1962)
- First Secretary Edward Gierek (1975)
- Foreign Minister Witold Waszczykowski (2017)

== Tourism and transportation ==
In 2016, 40,000 Polish citizens visited Cuba for tourism. There are direct charter flights between Cuba and Poland with LOT Polish Airlines.

== Trade ==
In 2016, trade between Cuba and Poland totaled US$48.7 million. Cuba's main exports to Poland are fish and other seafood, coffee, conserved fruit, alcoholic drinks and tobacco. Poland's main exports to Cuba include dairy products, grains, meat, airplane parts and agricultural equipment. Most of the exports between the 2 countries involve hard liquor, meat and tobacco.

== Resident diplomatic missions ==
- Cuba has an embassy in Warsaw.
- Poland has an embassy in Havana.

== See also ==
- Sigmund Sobolewski

== Bibliography ==
- Stosunki dyplomatyczne Polski. Informator. Tom II Ameryka Północna i Południowa 1918-2007, Ministerstwo Spraw Zagranicznych, Archiwum/Wydawnictwo Askon Warszawa 2008, 224 s., ISBN 978-83-7452-026-3
