= Cuba–Ireland relations =

- Cuba: Ireland

Diplomatic mission
- Embassy of Cuba, Dublin: None (Accredited from Mexico)

Cuba–Ireland relations refers to the bilateral relations between Ireland and Cuba. Both countries are members of the United Nations.

== History ==
Cuba and Ireland established diplomatic relations on 27 October 1999. Cuba opened their embassy in Dublin in 2001 while Ireland opened an honorary consulate in Cuba in 2002 but closed at an unknown date.

In 2019, Ireland and Cuba celebrated 20 years of relations.

== Diplomatic missions ==
- Cuba has an embassy in Dublin.
- Ireland's embassy in Mexico is accredited to Cuba.

== See also ==
- Foreign relations of Cuba
- Foreign relations of Ireland
