= Cuba–Portugal relations =

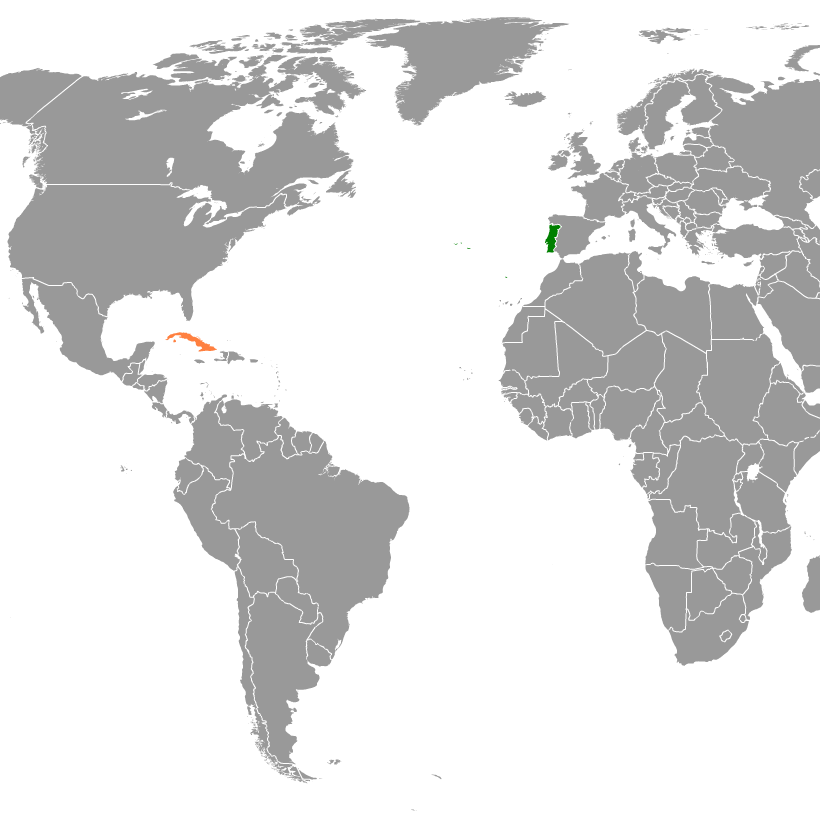

- Portugal: Cuba

Cuba and Portugal established diplomacy relations on 6 May 1919.

The countries signed a treaty on commerce in Havana on 6 September 1938.
