= Nicaragua–Turkey relations =

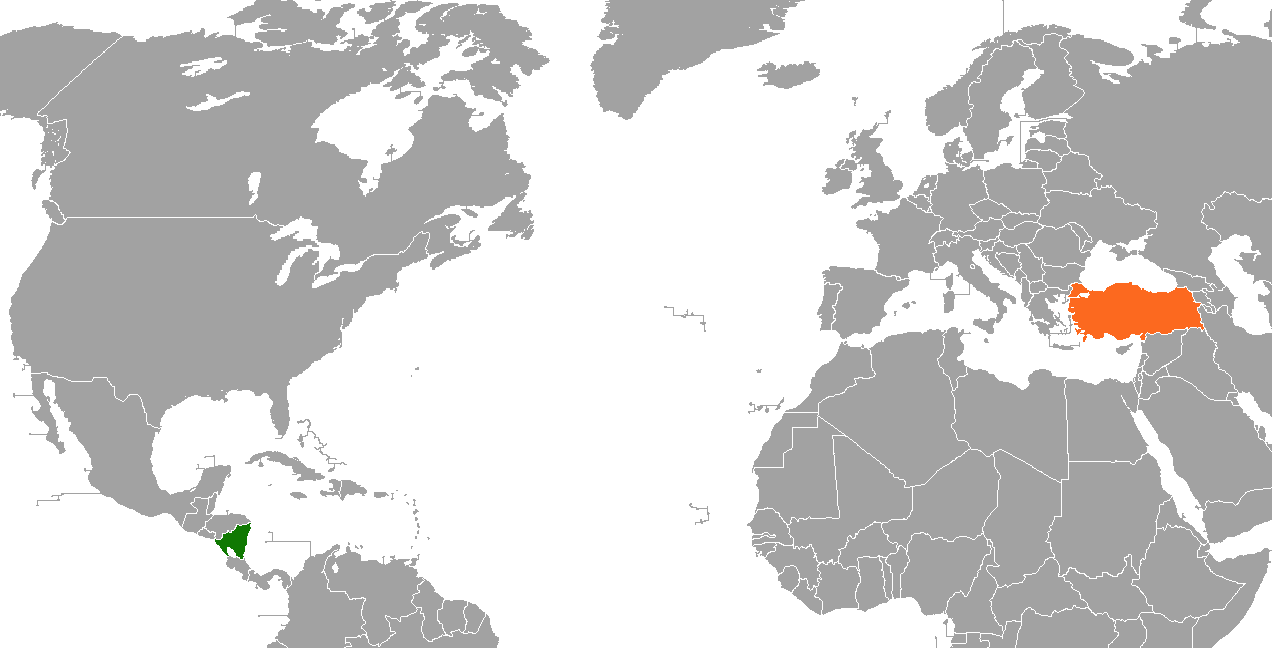

- Nicaragua: Turkey

Nicaragua–Turkey relations are the foreign relations between Nicaragua and Turkey. Turkey has an embassy in Managua to Nicaragua while Nicaragua's Embassy in Berlin, Germany is accredited to Turkey.

== History ==
In 2013, following civil aviation negotiations in Montreal, Nicaragua and Turkey signed an aviation agreement to create an air connection between Managua and Istanbul. The foreign ministers of both countries met on the sidelines of the UN, and announced that an agreement to deepen economic relations would be signed.

In February 2015, the Nicaraguan and Turkish governments signed a commercial and economic cooperation agreement. It was ratified by the Nicaraguan National Assembly in September 2017.

In 2016, Turkish president Recep Tayyip Erdoğan congratulated Ortega for his re-election, and the Nicaraguan government sent congratulations for the 95th anniversary of the establishment of the Turkish republic.

In 2017, Nicaraguan president Daniel Ortega, Nicaraguan Foreign Minister Denis Moncada Colindres, and Economy Minister Orlando Solorzano met with a delegation of Turkish businesspeople in Managua to discuss the deepening of economic relations between the two countries.

In 2018, Ortega sent a message of congratulations to Erdoğan in occasion of the 95th anniversary of the establishment of the Turkish republic.

In September 2021, Turkish foreign minister Mevlüt Çavuşoğlu met again with his counterpart at the UN. In October, during a visit of a Nicaraguan delegation led by Nicaragua's foreign minister Colindres, the two countries signed an agreement on agriculture and two memoranda of understanding. Subsequently, the Turkish government signaled it was opposed to sanctions on Nicaragua, and Colindes stated in the Daily Sabah that the two countries shared a commitment to strengthening international law, defending UN resolutions and the principle non-interference in internal affairs.

Nicaragua and Turkey are currently in talks to open embassies in each other's countries.

== Diplomatic visits ==
Guest	Host	Place of visit	Date of visit
(Nicaragua) Foreign Minister Samuel Santos López	(Turkey) President Recep Tayyip Erdoğan	Çankaya Köşkü, Ankara	August 28, 2014
(Nicaragua) Foreign Minister Sidharta Marin	(Turkey) Minister of Foreign Affairs Mevlüt Çavuşoğlu	Second Turkey–SICA Foreign Ministers Forum, Istanbul	April 20, 2017
(Nicaragua) Foreign Minister Sidharta Marin	(Turkey) President Recep Tayyip Erdoğan	Presidential Complex, Ankara	July 9, 2018
(Nicaragua) Foreign Minister Denis Moncada Colindres	(Turkey) President Recep Tayyip Erdoğan	Çankaya Köşkü, Ankara	July 23, 2019

== Economic relations ==
Trade volume between the two countries was US$11.6 million in 2019 (Turkish exports/imports: US$11.1/0.5 million).

Following Nicaraguan Poverty Reduction and Growth Facility with the IMF, Turkey signed Economic and Trade Cooperation Agreements with Nicaragua in 2015.

As part of the bilateral trade cooperation agreements, program, the Government of Nicaragua is negotiating a trade agreement with the Turkey as part of a Central American bloc.

In 2017, Nicaraguan President Daniel Ortega received a Turkish economic delegation and used the opportunity to encourage Turkish businesses to invest in Nicaragua.

== See also ==
- Foreign relations of Nicaragua
- Foreign relations of Turkey
