= Foreign relations of Nicaragua =

Nicaragua pursues a subordinated foreign policy to Russia and China. A participant of the Central American Security Commission, Nicaragua also has taken a leading role in pressing for regional demilitarization and peaceful settlement of disputes within states in the region.

Nicaragua has submitted three territorial disputes, one with Honduras, another with Colombia, and the third with Costa Rica to the International Court of Justice for resolution.

== International membership ==
At the 1994 Summit of the Americas, Nicaragua joined six Central American neighbors in signing the Alliance for Sustainable Development, known as the Conjunta Centroamerica-USA or CONCAUSA, to promote sustainable economic development in the region.

Nicaragua belongs to the United Nations and several specialized and related agencies, including:

- World Bank
- International Monetary Fund (IMF)
- World Trade Organization (WTO)
- UN Educational, Scientific, and Cultural Organization (UNESCO)
- World Health Organization (WHO)
- Food and Agriculture Organization (FAO)
- International Labour Organization (ILO)
- UN Human Rights Commission (UNHRC)
- Non-Aligned Movement (NAM)
- International Atomic Energy Commission (IAEA)
- Inter-American Development Bank (IDB)
- Central American Common Market (CACM)
- Central American Bank for Economic Integration (CABEI).
- Bolivarian Alliance for the Americas (ALBA)
- Caribbean Community (CARICOM)
- Association of Caribbean States (ACS)
- Community of Latin American and Caribbean States (CELAC)
- Latin American Economic System (SELA)
- Central American Integration System (SICA)

== International disputes ==
- Territorial disputes with Colombia over the Archipelago de San Andres y Providencia and Quita Sueno Bank with respect to the maritime boundary question in the Golfo de Fonseca. The ICJ referred to the line determined by the 1900 Honduras-Nicaragua Mixed Boundary Commission and advised that some tripartite resolution among El Salvador, Honduras and Nicaragua likely would be required;
- Maritime boundary dispute with Honduras in the Caribbean Sea.
- Nicaragua is sovereign over the Rio San Juan, and by treaty Costa Rica has the right to navigate over part of the river with 'objects of commerce'. A dispute emerged when Costa Rica tried to navigate with armed members of its security forces.

Nicaragua severed relations with Italy on 16 July 2026 following the call by the latter's foreign minister, Antonio Tajani, for the extradition of Alessio Casimirri, who became a naturalized citizen of Nicaragua, which is unconstitutional in Nicaragua. Casimirri is wanted for the killing of former prime minister of Italy, Aldo Moro. The Red Brigades intended to exchange him for imprisoned members before he was found dead two months later in Rome. Tajani had earlier stated that Italy had nothing in common "with the vision of extremist governments such as that of Nicaragua, a country that still provides protection to dangerous terrorists. Italy will continue to demand that Casimirri answer to the Italian justice system for the crimes of which he has been found guilty, as has already been requested in a European Parliament resolution."

== International relations with intergovernmental organizations and countries ==
Nicaragua signed a 3-year Poverty Reduction and Growth Facility (PRGF) with the International Monetary Fund (IMF) in October 2007. As part of the IMF program, the Government of Nicaragua agreed to implement free market policies linked to targets on fiscal discipline, poverty spending, and energy regulation. The lack of transparency surrounding Venezuelan bilateral assistance, channeled through state-run enterprises rather than the official budget, has become a serious issue for the IMF and international donors. On September 10, 2008, with misgivings about fiscal transparency, the IMF released an additional $30 million to Nicaragua, the second tranche of its $110 million PRGF.

The flawed municipal elections of November 2008 prompted a number of European donors to suspend direct budget support to Nicaragua, a move that created a severe budget shortfall for the government. This shortfall, in turn, caused the Government of Nicaragua to fall out of compliance with its PRGF obligations and led to a suspension of PRGF disbursements. The IMF is currently in negotiations with the Government of Nicaragua to reinstate disbursements.

Under current president Daniel Ortega, Nicaragua has stayed current with the Central American-Dominican Republic Free Trade Agreement, which entered into force for Nicaragua on April 1, 2006. Nicaragua exports to the United States, which account for 59% of Nicaragua's total exports, were $1.7 billion in 2008, up 45% from 2005. Textiles and apparel account for 55% of exports to the United States, while automobile wiring harnesses add another 11%.

Other leading export products are coffee, meat, cigars, sugar, ethanol, and fresh fruit and vegetables, all of which have seen remarkable growth since CAFTA-DR went into effect. Leading Nicaraguan exports also demonstrated increased diversity, with 274 new products shipped to the United States in the first year. U.S. exports to Nicaragua, meanwhile, were $1.1 billion in 2008, up 23% from 2005. Other important trading partners for Nicaragua are its Central American neighbors, Mexico, and the European Union. Nicaragua is negotiating a trade agreement with the European Union as part of a Central American bloc.

Despite important protections for investment included in CAFTA-DR, the investment climate has become relatively insecure since Ortega took office. According to the United States State Department, President Ortega's decision to support "radical regimes" such as Iran and Cuba, his harsh rhetoric against the United States and capitalism, and his use of government institutions to persecute political enemies and their businesses, has had a negative effect on perceptions of country risk, which by some accounts has quadrupled since he assumed office. The government reports foreign investment inflows totaled $506 million in 2008, including $123 million in telecommunications infrastructure and $120 million in energy generation.

There are over 100 companies operating in Nicaragua with some relation to a U.S. company, either as wholly or partly owned subsidiaries, franchisees, or exclusive distributors of U.S. products. The largest are in energy, financial services, textiles/apparel, manufacturing, and fisheries. However, many companies in the textile/apparel sector, including a $100 million U.S.-owned denim mill, had shuttered by 2017.

Poor enforcement of property rights deters both foreign and domestic investment, especially in real estate development and tourism. Conflicting claims and weak enforcement of property rights has invited property disputes and litigation. Establishing verifiable title history is often entangled in legalities relating to the expropriation of 28,000 properties by the revolutionary government that Ortega led in the 1980s. The situation is not helped by a court system that is widely believed to be corrupt and subject to political influence.

Illegal property seizures by private parties, occasionally in collaboration with corrupt municipal officials, often go unchallenged by the authorities, especially in the Atlantic regions and interior regions of the north, where property rights are poorly defined and rule of law is weak. Foreign investor interest along the Pacific Coast has motivated some unscrupulous people to challenge ownership rights in the Departments of Rivas and Chinandega, with the hope of achieving some sort of cash settlement.

== Diplomatic relations ==
List of countries which Nicaragua maintains diplomatic relations with:

#	Country	Date
1	Colombia	8 March 1825
2	Mexico	1839
3	El Salvador	24 July 1840
4	Guatemala	15 May 1845
5	United States	24 December 1849
6	Spain	21 March 1851
7	Chile	March 1857
8	Peru	5 October 1857
9	Belgium	18 May 1858
10	United Kingdom	18 January 1859
11	France	11 April 1859
12	Honduras	1864
13	Costa Rica	30 July 1868
14	Argentina	14 February 1882
—	Ecuador (suspended)	26 October 1885
15	Venezuela	22 June 1891
16	Cuba	3 September 1905
—	Italy (suspended)	25 January 1906
17	Brazil	22 November 1906
—	Netherlands (suspended)	30 July 1908
—	Holy See (suspended)	19 December 1908
18	Uruguay	11 January 1929
19	Czech Republic	20 March 1930
20	Poland	18 November 1933
21	Japan	20 February 1935
22	Sweden	10 January 1936
23	Panama	13 December 1938
24	Denmark	1 May 1947
25	Norway	5 July 1947
—	Israel (suspended)	18 May 1948
26	Dominican Republic	17 June 1949
27	Turkey	21 September 1950
28	Germany	10 April 1952
29	Haiti	6 August 1952
30	Bolivia	6 July 1955
31	Paraguay	18 January 1956
32	Portugal	3 March 1958
33	Switzerland	30 October 1958
34	Canada	June 1961
35	South Korea	26 January 1962
36	Austria	29 April 1963
37	Greece	2 July 1965
38	Trinidad and Tobago	1971
39	India	25 October 1972
40	Philippines	10 August 1973
41	Jamaica	15 August 1975
42	Barbados	8 November 1975
43	Thailand	24 November 1975
44	Finland	22 December 1975
45	Iran	29 April 1976
46	Suriname	24 June 1976
47	Luxembourg	7 July 1976
48	Pakistan	27 September 1976
49	Hungary	1 October 1977
50	Egypt	11 September 1978
51	Romania	6 January 1979
52	Zambia	21 April 1979
53	Serbia	10 August 1979
54	North Korea	24 August 1979
55	Malta	August 1979
56	Vietnam	3 September 1979
57	Republic of the Congo	13 September 1979
58	Russia	13 September 1979
59	Grenada	29 September 1979
60	Mongolia	13 October 1979
61	Albania	November 1979
62	Bulgaria	16 November 1979
63	Zimbabwe	April 1980
64	Laos	30 May 1980
65	Tanzania	December 1980
66	Mozambique	January 1981
67	Libya	19 May 1981
68	Belize	21 September 1981
69	Algeria	September 1981
70	Guyana	23 November 1981
71	Cyprus	26 May 1982
72	Lebanon	16 June 1982
73	Iceland	16 December 1982
74	Bangladesh	15 February 1983
75	Yemen	21 February 1983
76	Afghanistan	12 March 1983
77	Ghana	March 1983
78	Lesotho	14 June 1983
79	Guinea	5 July 1983
80	Liberia	July 1983
81	Cape Verde	25 October 1983
82	Burkina Faso	30 November 1983
83	Australia	4 December 1983
84	Ethiopia	7 May 1984
85	Seychelles	22 May 1984
86	Benin	5 June 1984
87	Equatorial Guinea	20 September 1984
88	Madagascar	26 October 1984
89	Mauritius	March 1985
90	China	7 December 1985
91	Vanuatu	6 June 1986
92	Nepal	2 October 1986
93	Ivory Coast	3 April 1987
94	Democratic Republic of the Congo	4 May 1987
95	Indonesia	11 April 1988
96	New Zealand	30 August 1988
97	Angola	20 October 1988
—	Sahrawi Arab Democratic Republic	10 March 1989
—	State of Palestine	24 September 1989
98	Iraq	26 November 1989
99	Jordan	27 May 1991
100	Kuwait	27 June 1991
101	Saint Vincent and the Grenadines	28 June 1991
102	United Arab Emirates	1 August 1991
103	Bahrain	15 August 1991
104	Qatar	15 August 1991
105	Oman	26 September 1991
106	Bahamas	3 January 1992
107	Antigua and Barbuda	20 February 1992
108	Slovenia	14 April 1992
109	Saint Kitts and Nevis	May 1992
—	Ukraine (suspended)	30 November 1992
110	Saint Lucia	1992
111	Slovakia	5 January 1993
112	Singapore	6 January 1993
113	Malaysia	17 February 1993
114	Mali	27 July 1993
115	Moldova	8 November 1993
116	Cambodia	10 March 1994
117	Lithuania	23 March 1994
118	Belarus	24 May 1994
119	Latvia	20 June 1994
120	Kazakhstan	5 July 1994
121	Armenia	6 July 1994
—	Georgia (suspended)	14 September 1994
122	South Africa	15 September 1994
123	Azerbaijan	23 November 1994
124	Andorra	29 June 1995
125	North Macedonia	28 March 1996
126	Croatia	29 March 1996
127	Turkmenistan	29 August 1996
128	Brunei	July 1998
129	Syria	14 February 1999
130	Morocco	21 July 2000
131	Nigeria	24 April 2001
132	Ireland	9 September 2003
133	Estonia	4 March 2004
134	Saudi Arabia	30 March 2006
135	Uzbekistan	23 February 2007
136	Botswana	28 August 2007
137	Timor-Leste	2 November 2007
138	Dominica	2 June 2009
—	Abkhazia	14 September 2009
139	Montenegro	24 September 2009
140	San Marino	2 October 2009
141	Bosnia and Herzegovina	22 October 2009
142	Maldives	11 May 2010
143	Solomon Islands	20 April 2011
—	South Ossetia	26 July 2011
144	Tuvalu	3 August 2011
145	Fiji	21 September 2012
146	Liechtenstein	23 February 2013
147	Sudan	27 June 2014
148	Tajikistan	30 March 2016
149	Kyrgyzstan	7 July 2017
150	Sri Lanka	15 May 2019
151	Eritrea	6 June 2019
152	Uganda	7 June 2019
153	Central African Republic	12 June 2019
154	Marshall Islands	13 June 2019
155	Palau	17 June 2019
156	Burundi	26 June 2019
157	Tunisia	2 July 2019
158	Gambia	8 July 2019
159	South Sudan	22 July 2019
160	Kenya	30 July 2019
161	Niger	8 August 2019
162	Monaco	4 September 2019
163	Djibouti	9 September 2019
164	Eswatini	17 September 2019
165	Comoros	18 September 2019
166	Mauritania	14 October 2019
167	Namibia	16 October 2019
168	Nauru	18 October 2019
169	Togo	23 October 2019
170	Cameroon	1 November 2019
171	Rwanda	8 November 2019
172	Federated States of Micronesia	11 December 2019
173	Myanmar	6 August 2020
174	Sierra Leone	25 September 2020
175	Kiribati	17 May 2021
176	Gabon	14 June 2021
177	Chad	24 September 2021
178	Malawi	25 September 2022
179	Papua New Guinea	17 February 2023
180	Tonga	28 February 2024
181	Somalia	27 September 2024
182	São Tomé and Príncipe	Unknown
183	Senegal	Unknown

== Bilateral relations ==
Country	Formal Relations Began	Notes
China	1985 (With the People's Republic of China)	See China–Nicaragua relations Nicaragua established diplomatic relations with the Republic of China in 1930 but maintained relations after the central government of the Republic of China retreated to Taiwan after declaring the establishment of the People's Republic of China in 1949. After the Sandinista National Liberation Front took power in 1979, Nicaragua recognized the PRC on 7 December 1985 until 9 November 1990 when FSLN was defeated and resumed relations with the ROC, which continued under Daniel Ortega's presidency since 2007. On 9 December 2021, Nicaragua resumed relations with the PRC.
Colombia		See Colombia–Nicaragua relations The relationship between the two Latin American countries has evolved amid conflicts over the San Andrés y Providencia Islands located in the Caribbean close to the Nicaraguan shoreline and the maritime boundaries covering 150,000 km^{2} that included the islands of San Andres, Providencia and Santa Catalina and the banks of Roncador, Serrana, Serranilla and Quitasueño as well as the arbitrarily designed 82nd meridian west which Colombia claims as a border but which the International Court has sided with Nicaragua in disavowing. The archipelago has been under Colombian control since 1931 when a treaty was signed during US occupation of Nicaragua, giving Colombia control over the islands.: Colombia has an embassy in Managua.; Nicaragua has an embassy in Bogotá.
Costa Rica		See Costa Rica–Nicaragua relations
Cuba	3 September 1905	See Cuba–Nicaragua relations
Denmark		See Denmark–Nicaragua relations
Finland		See Finland–Nicaragua relations Finland is a significant donor of aid to Nicaragua. In 2007, total aid amounted to around EUR 14.5 million. The cooperation focused on rural development, health care and supporting local government. In 1992, the Finnish government announced an aid program of US$27.4 million. In 2006, the Finnish government pledged 4.9 million euros to help the Nicaraguan government integrate the ICT systems of 20 town councils. In 2008, the Finnish government revoked a 1.95 million euro aid package meant for Nicaragua in protest of what it alleged was a lack of transparency in Nicaragua's national budget and its municipal elections. In 2004, Finnish President Tarja Halonen visited Nicaragua where she stated "The Finnish government and Parliament have decided that Nicaragua is one of the main targets of Finnish development aid. However, the visit has shown that Finland is not only giving money – it is also interested in what is happening here". The Finnish President also made a speech to the National Assembly of Nicaragua on 31 May 2004. In 2003, the two countries signed the Agreement for the Promotion and Reciprocal Protection of Investments. In February 2012, Finland made decision to stop development aid to Nicaragua. The main reason was concern over the state of the democracy in Nicaragua.: Finland is accredited to Nicaragua from its embassy in Mexico City, Mexico.; Nicaragua has an honorary consulate in Helsinki.
Georgia	Diplomatic relations severed in November 2008	Nicaraguan-Georgian diplomatic relations established on 19 September 1994 and ended on 29 November 2008. The Georgian Foreign Ministry said that it had cut diplomatic ties with Nicaragua in a response to the latter's recognition of independence of breakaway South Ossetia and Abkhazia.
Germany		See Germany–Nicaragua relations: In April 2024, Nicaragua closed its embassy in Berlin. In future, official duties will be assumed by the Nicaraguan diplomatic mission in Austria.
Greece		See Greece–Nicaragua relations
Holy See		See Holy See–Nicaragua relations
India		See India-Nicaragua relations: India has an honorary consulate in Managua.; Nicaragua has honorary consulate in New Delhi and in Mumbai.
Israel	Diplomatic relations severed in October 2024	Israel was the last country that still shipped weapons to the embattled Anastacio Somoza regime in 1978–1979 (the dictator's father had supported Israel in 1948, establishing a "special relationship" between Nicaragua and Israel), becoming the regime's main supplier of arms, after the Carter administration had cut off supplies amid the public outcry over Somozista troops' atrocities. This soured the relations with the -Sandinista government; the relations were then gradually normalized. In March 2017, Nicaragua and Israel reestablished diplomatic relations after they were suspended in 2010. In October 2024, Nicaragua broke ties with Israel again in solidarity with the Palestinian government and people amid the Gaza war.
Mexico	1838	See Mexico–Nicaragua relations: Mexico has an embassy in Managua.; Nicaragua has an embassy in Mexico City.
Russia	October 1979	See Nicaragua–Russia relations Both countries signed diplomatic missions on October 18, 1979, a few months after the Sandinista revolution.
South Korea	January 1962	The establishment of diplomatic relations between the Republic of Korea and the Republic of Nicaragua began in January 1962.: South Korea has an embassy in Managua.
Netherlands	Diplomatic Relations severed in October 2022	The direct cause for severing relations was the Netherlands' decision to definitively terminate its financial contribution to the Nicaraguan authorities for the construction of a hospital in Nicaragua, which has been on hold for several years.
Spain	20 March 1851	See Nicaragua–Spain relations: Nicaragua has an embassy in Madrid.; Spain has an embassy in Managua.
Switzerland	1956	Swiss Cooperation Office in Managua Relations with Nicaragua and Switzerland focus on development cooperation, humanitarian aid and trade.: Nicaragua is accredited to Switzerland from its embassy in Berlin, Germany.; Switzerland is accredited to Nicaragua from its embassy in San José, Costa Rica and maintains a Swiss cooperation office in Managua.
Syria	February 14, 1999	See Nicaragua–Syria relations
Turkey	Nov. 11, 1926	See Nicaragua–Turkey relations: Turkey has an embassy in Managua.; Nicaraguan embassy in Berlin is accredited to Turkey.; Trade volume between the two countries was US$11.6 million in 2019 (Nicaraguan exports/imports: 0.5/11.1 million USD).
United Kingdom	1859	See Nicaragua–United Kingdom relations Nicaragua established diplomatic relations with the United Kingdom on 18 January 1859.: Nicaragua maintains an embassy in London.; The United Kingdom is accredited to Nicaragua from its embassy in San Jose, Costa Rica; there is no British embassy in Nicaragua.; Both countries share common membership of the World Trade Organization, as well as the Central America–United Kingdom Association Agreement. Bilaterally the two countries have an investment agreement.
United States	1824; 1849	See Nicaragua–United States relations Embassy of Nicaragua in Washington, D.C.: Nicaragua has an embassy in Washington, D.C., and consulates-general in Miami and New York.; United States has an embassy in Managua.
Uruguay	1849	See Nicaragua–Uruguay relations Embassy of Nicaragua in Montevideo: Nicaragua has an embassy in Montevideo.; Uruguay is accredited to Nicaragua from its embassy in Guatemala City, Guatemala.

=== States with limited recognition ===
The following table includes Republic of China, Georgia, and some of the states with limited recognition:

Name	Recognized by Nicaragua	Notes
Abkhazia		See Abkhazia–Nicaragua relations Nicaragua recognized Abkhazia and South Ossetia on September 5, 2008. At a press conference in November 2008, Nicaraguan Foreign Minister Samuel Santos López said, "Certainly, we think that the decision [to recognize independent Abkhazia and South Ossetia] was fair and appropriate. They [the republics] must be given time for inner formalities. We will coordinate the possibility and terms of direct diplomatic relations at a convenient moment. Obviously and logically, we will be acting via our friends, probably Russia, to establish closer contacts and diplomatic relations [with the republics]."
Palestine	Yes	Palestine has an embassy in Managua.; Nicaraguan foreign minister, Denis Moncada, has publicly expressed solidarity with Palestinian statehood and called for "an end to the Israeli occupation of Palestinian territories," and the "liberation of Palestinian prisoners."
South Ossetia	Yes	See Nicaragua–South Ossetia relations Nicaragua extended diplomatic recognition to South Ossetia and Abkhazia on 5 September 2008. After the recognition was announced, the Nicaraguan Foreign Ministry stated that they would immediately establish ties with Tskhinvali and would eventually appoint an ambassador to the republic. At a press conference in November 2008, Nicaraguan Foreign Minister Samuel Santos López said, "Certainly, we think that the decision [to recognize independent Abkhazia and South Ossetia] was fair and appropriate. They [the republics] must be given time for inner formalities. We will coordinate the possibility and terms of direct diplomatic relations at a convenient moment. Obviously and logically, we will be acting via our friends, probably Russia, to establish closer contacts and diplomatic relations [with the republics]." The recognition of South Ossetia by Nicaragua triggered immediate reactions from other countries involved in the dispute over the status of South Ossetia. Georgia responded to Nicaragua's concurrent recognition of Abkhazia and South Ossetia by cutting diplomatic relations with the Central American state at the end of November 2008. Russia offered to strengthen ties with Nicaragua and to provide aid to Nicaragua to help rebuild areas damaged by hurricanes. The U.S. Secretary of Commerce canceled a planned trip to Nicaragua, with the U.S. Ambassador in Managua saying, "It isn't the appropriate moment for the visit."
Sovereign Military Order of Malta	Yes	A sovereign entity without territory, established diplomatic relations with 104 states.
Taiwan	Diplomatic relations severed in 2021	Nicaragua used to maintain official diplomatic relations with Taiwan instead of the People's Republic of China. In 2007, President Daniel Ortega stated that Nicaragua will maintain its diplomatic ties with Taiwan. Ortega defended Nicaragua's right of having diplomatic relations with Taiwan and China at the same time and insisted that Nicaragua will not break its diplomatic relations with Taiwan and Vice-president Jaime Morales Carazo (during Ortega's first tenure) criticized the People's Republic of China for conditioning Nicaragua's diplomatic relations. Nicaragua maintained its diplomatic relations with Taiwan until 2021. On December 9, 2021, Nicaragua broke off diplomatic relations with the Republic of China and recognised the PRC as the legitimate Chinese government.

== See also ==
- List of diplomatic missions in Nicaragua
- List of diplomatic missions of Nicaragua
- Nicaragua v. United States
- Brazil–Nicaragua relations
- Nicaragua–United States relations
