= Cuba–Nicaragua relations =

Bilateral diplomatic relations

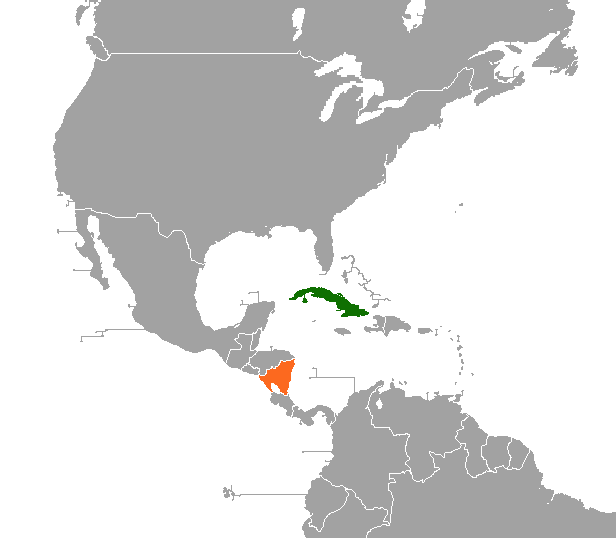

- Cuba: Nicaragua

Cuba and Nicaragua established diplomatic relations on 3 September 1905. Relations between the two countries were particularly strong during Nicaragua's initial Sandinista period and have remained strong since the 2007 election of Daniel Ortega.

== History ==
Cuba and Nicaragua established diplomatic relations on 3 September 1905. In February 1958 the American I. Irving Davidson brokered a deal whereby Nicaragua diverted the shipment of 28 Israeli staghound tanks to the Caribbean island.

During the rule of the Somoza family dictatorship, Nicaragua was hostile to socialist Cuba. Nonetheless, When Nicaragua's capital Managua was destroyed by an earthquake in 1972, Cuba supplied a disaster relief team to assist in recovery.

In 1979, the Sandinista revolution in Nicaragua overthrew the Somoza family. Relations between Cuba and Nicaragua countries were close during the revolutionary Sandinista period in Nicaragua. After the success of the Sandinista revolution, Cuba provided health care workers to Nicaragua to establish clinics for the poor of Nicaragua and to establish training centers for Nicaraguan health care workers. In September 1979, Fernando Cardenal traveled to Cuba to study the success of the Cuban literacy campaign. Following the visit, Cardenal invited Cuban literacy experts to Nicaragua to provide Sandinista literacy campaign organizers with support and technical assistance.

Over the course of the 1980s, Cuba provided approximately 90,000 tons of oil to Nicaragua per year.

Cuba provided the Sandinistas with military advisors. According to Fidel Castro, these advisors were primarily military instructors.

To help Nicaragua establish rural schools, Cuba supplied primary school teachers to the country. Cuban primary school teachers were the largest single group of aid workers provided by Cuba to Nicaragua during the 1980s, with their numbers peaking at 4,000 in 1984. After the United States invasion of Grenada, Cuban concerns that the United States might also invade Nicaragua increased and Cuba removed its female primary school teachers from the country.

Cuba provided further aid workers to Nicaragua after flooding in 1991, a 1992 volcanic eruption, and hurricanes in 1988 and 1998.

Relations between the two countries deteriorated when the Sandinista government was voted out of office.

Following the 2007 election of Marxist-Leninist politician Daniel Ortega to the presidency in Nicaragua, relations between the two countries again became close.

During the COVID-19 pandemic in early 2020, Nicaragua was among the fourteen countries to which Cuba sent medical teams as part of its medical internationalism.

The government of Nicaragua cancelled visa-free travel for Cuban citizens during the 2026 Cuban crisis. This border was a frequent route to escape Cuba, used by thousands of migrants since its implementation in November 2021 following the COVID-19 pandemic. It is unclear if the measure was a direct request from United States administration but it is part of a series of concessions made by the administration of Daniel Ortega.

== Resident diplomatic missions ==
- Cuba has an embassy in Managua.
- Nicaragua has an embassy in Havana.

== See also ==
- Cuban assistance to the Sandinista National Liberation Front
- Foreign relations of Cuba
- Foreign relations of Nicaragua
