= Greece–Nicaragua relations =

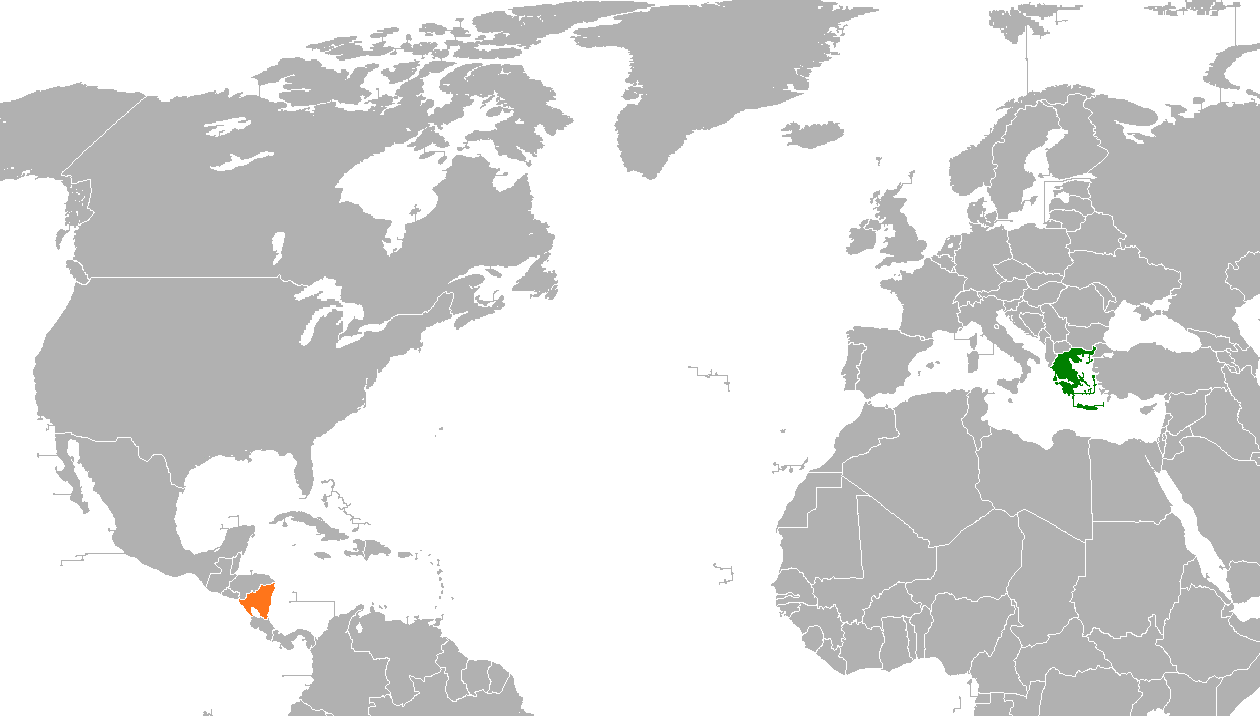

- Greece: Nicaragua

Greece–Nicaragua relations are foreign relations between Greece and Nicaragua. Diplomatic relations were officially established on 2 July 1965. Greece is represented in Nicaragua through its embassy in Mexico City. Nicaragua is represented in Greece through its embassy in Rome.

== Assistance ==
Greece has been a major sponsor of humanitarian aid to Nicaragua, providing significant economic, food and development aid to Nicaragua.

== Military ==
In 1898 Nicaragua asked to buy the three largest ironclads in the Greek fleet, but Greece declined the offer.

During the government of the Panhellenic Socialist Movement from 1981 led by Andreas Papandreou, Greek foreign relations turned from Americanization to a more anti-American stance. This included supporting and being well-disposed toward the Sandinistas in Nicaragua. Papandreou repeatedly described the United States action against the Sandinistas as engaging in terrorism. In 1985 the Greek government secretly donated 5000 G-3 rifles to Nicaragua to support the Sandinista resistance. Greek officials denied it.

== Diplomacy ==
By 1966 there were no trade relations between the countries, but diplomatic relations had been established through the United Nations. Pierre Calongeras had recently been appointed as the Greek ambassador to Mexico, Central America and the Caribbean, and a study was conducted on potential goods for trade with Nicaragua. He also attempted to strengthen cultural ties between the countries through visits of Greek theater groups and Greek films.

In 2006 the Greek ambassador to Nicaragua was Alexander A. Migliaressis.

In June 2011 Samuel Santos Lopez the Nicaraguan Foreign Minister visited Athens to advance international socialism. He spoke of a close friendship with the Greek President of the time Karolos Papoulias, based on Papoulias' support for the Sandinistas in the 1980s. When asked about potential cooperation over trade, culture and tourism, he singled out tourism as the current focus of Nicaraguan efforts.

== Investment ==
Greek investor Peter Tsokos has purchased and sold a number of Nicaraguan islands claimed as communal lands in the South Caribbean Coast Autonomous Region as part of a tourism project. He was permanently cleared of wrongdoing within the Nicaraguan judiciary. Tsokos was accused of ordering the murder of an indigenous rights lawyer's husband in Bluefields, by the Civil court in 2002, by the Appellate court in 2004 and finally by the Supreme court of Nicaragua in 2006.

== See also ==
- Foreign relations of Greece
- Foreign relations of Nicaragua
