= Nicaragua–South Africa relations =

- Nicaragua: South Africa

Nicaragua–South Africa relations refers to the bilateral relations between Nicaragua and South Africa. Nicaragua has an embassy in Pretoria. South Africa has a non resident ambassador in Mexico City.

== Political relations ==
- 1979 - Nicaragua is a member of the Non-Aligned Movement, which opposed apartheid in South Africa.
- 1994 - Nicaragua and South Africa open diplomatic relations.
- 1994 - Nicaraguan embassy opens in Waterkloof Ridge, Pretoria.
- 1994 - The South African embassy in Mexico City is accredited to Nicaragua.
- 2024 - Nicaragua joins South Africa’s genocide case against Israel at the International Court of Justice (ICJ).
- 2024 - Nicaragua initiates proceedings against Germany at the ICJ as a result of Germany's support for Israel, citing alleged breaches of obligations related to Palestinian occupation.
- 2026 – On 23 March, South Africa and Nicaragua signed a Memorandum of Understanding (MoU) on Political Consultations in Pretoria, establishing their first formal framework for structured bilateral consultations.

== Military relations ==
In 1980, Nicaragua was part of the United Nations resolution condemning military and nuclear collaboration with South Africa.

== Resident diplomatic missions ==
- Nicaragua has an embassy in Pretoria.
- South Africa is accredited to Nicaragua from its embassy in Mexico City, Mexico.

== See also ==
- Foreign relations of Nicaragua
- Foreign relations of South Africa
