= India–Nicaragua relations =

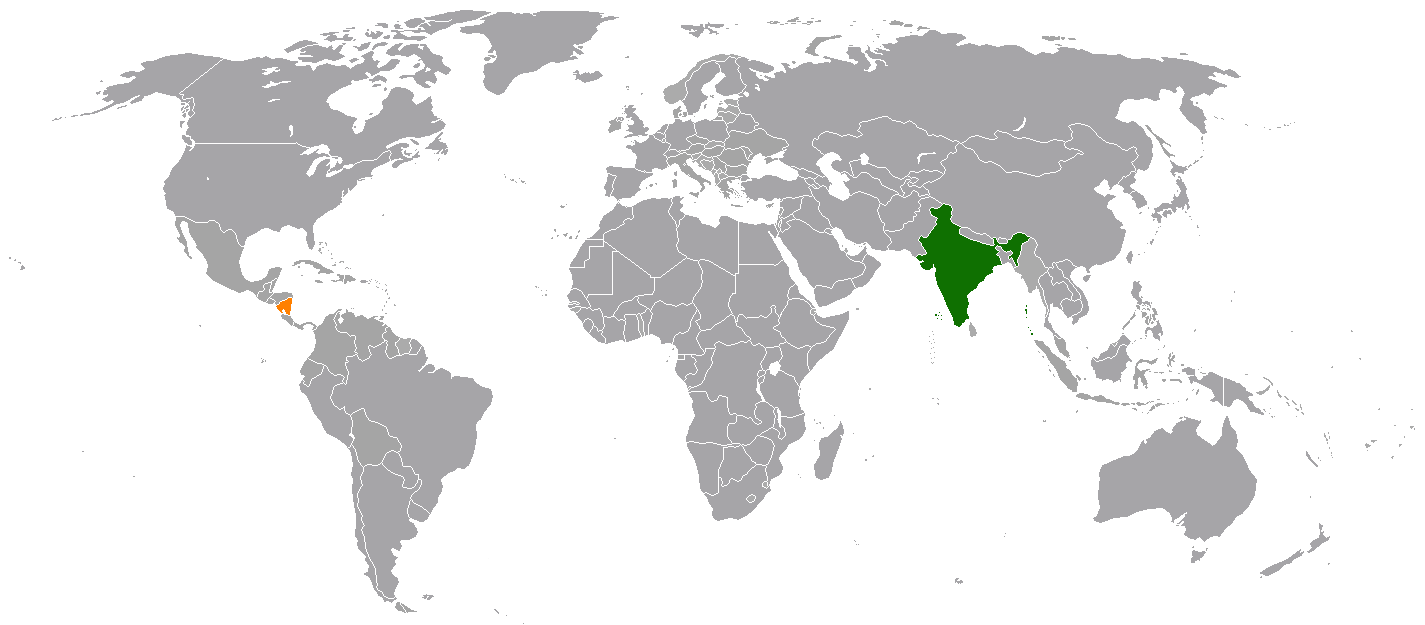

- India: Nicaragua

Relations between India and Nicaragua have been limited to Central American Integration System dialogue and visits by Nicaraguan Ministers to India. Nicaragua supports India's candidatures for UN bodies and international organizations. This includes the International Maritime Organization, Universal Postal Union, ECOSOC committees, UN ECOSOC, UNESCO's ICH, ICPO-Interpol, and UNSC non-permanent membership.

India maintains an honorary consul general in Nicaragua, concurrently accredited to the Indian embassy in Panama City and Nicaragua used to maintain an embassy in India. It was reduced to an honorary consulate general in New Delhi.

== History ==
Visits between the two nations had been by the speaker of the Indian parliament, Shivraj Patil, for an Inter Parliamentary Union Event in 1989 and the then Labour & Welfare minister, Ram Vilas Paswan, who attended the inauguration of President Chamorro in April 1990. While on the Nicaraguan side, various top level ministers attended many summits hosted by India and even the current Foreign minister Samuel Santos López visiting India in 2008 for the SICA-India Foreign ministers' meeting and in 2013 with high-level talks with the then External Affairs minister Salman Khurshid which also expanded trade with the two countries and also opened up possibility of Indian businessmen investing in the Nicaraguan canal project. In October 2019, the two countries met in India to further strengthen bilateral cooperation.

== Trade ==
Bilateral trade between the two countries for the year 2012–13 was US$60.12 million with India exporting cotton, automobiles and accessories, iron & steel, rubber & rubber products and pharmaceuticals whereas Nicaragua's export consists of skin & leather, wood & wooden articles, raw hides, etc. India has also donated surgical equipment and medicines worth ₹338,000 in 1998 and again in 2001 worth US$10,000 to help the drought-stricken country. Many Indian industries and companies have set up in relation with Nicaraguan companies like Praj Industries of Pune setting up an ethanol production plant for Nicaragua Sugar Estates Limited, Bajaj Industries selling large numbers of three wheeler auto-taxi locally every year and Mahindra Jeep being sold with the help of Grupo Pellas of Nicaragua, the country's largest business group. The National Electricity Transmission Company (Enatrel) chief executive, Salvador Mansell, under the Nicaraguan government delegation has sought a loan of US$57 million from India for the construction of three power projects in the country, two electrical substations and a transmission line of 138 kilowatts, which is under negotiations.

== See also ==
- Foreign relations of India
- Foreign relations of Nicaragua
