= Denmark–Nicaragua relations =

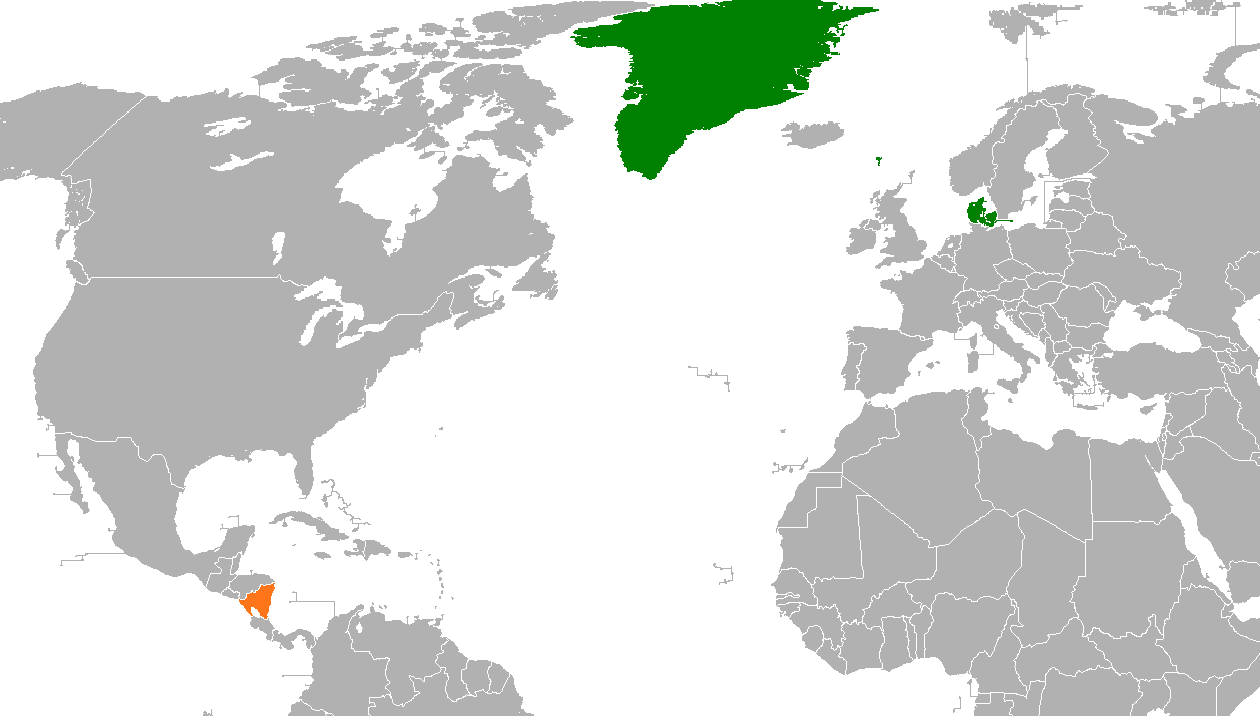

- Denmark: Nicaragua

Denmark–Nicaragua relations refers to the bilateral relationship between Denmark and Nicaragua. Denmark is accredited to Nicaragua from its embassy in Mexico City, Mexico. Nicaragua is accredited to Denmark from its embassy in Helsinki, Finland. The relations are described as good. Nicaragua is a Danish programme country since 1993.

== History ==
The Danish-Nicaraguan development co-operation began in 1981. In 1993, Nicaragua was chosen as one of 20 programme countries for Danish development assistance. In 1989 Denmark was part of a group of countries that combined to give $20 million to Nicaragua in response to domestic concessions which led to the 1990 general election which ousted the Sandinista National Liberation Front from power. In the 1990s, Denmark donated $1.8 million to support the clearance of landmines in Nicaragua. 8,700 landmines were cleared in the area where Denmark finances activities.

== Danish assistance ==
The Danish development programme assists Nicaragua within four priority sectors: transportation, agriculture, environment and education.

In 2009, Denmark announced it would reduce its aid from about $35 million in 2009 to about $26 million in 2010, also saying it would redirect some of the aid towards civil society actors rather than direct assistance to Nicaragua's government. The announcement was made by Danish development cooperation minister Ulla Tørnæs during a visit to the Latin American country where she met president Daniel Ortega. Tørnæs also called on the Nicaraguan government to respect democratic norms with regards to free elections.

Denmark helps Nicaragua with building a road between the two municipalities; Nueva Guinea and Bluefields.

In 2010, Denmark went on to announce their intention to stop providing all development funds to Nicargaua, though they did not indicate a firm date for this to happen. This was presented as part of Denmark's overall strategy to stop giving aid to Latin American countries so it can better focus its development budget on Africa. In 2010, Lene Espersen said that Denmark will close their embassy in Managua.

In February 2011, Denmark assisted Nicaragua with $18 million to the Nicaraguan general election, 2011, but the government of Nicaragua refused the money.

== State visits ==
Danish Prime Minister Anders Fogh Rasmussen visited Nicaragua in 2003 and Nicaraguan President Enrique Bolaños Geyer visited Denmark in 2004.

== See also ==
- Foreign relations of Denmark
- Foreign relations of Nicaragua
