= Finland–Nicaragua relations =

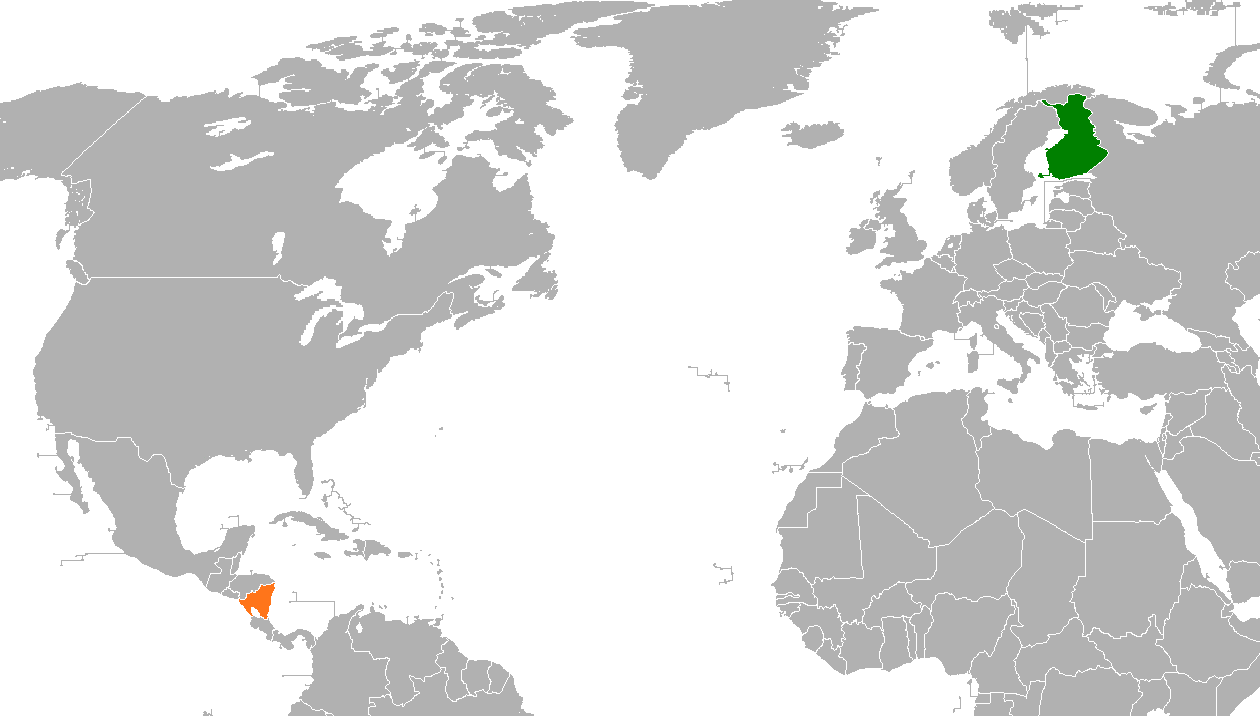

- Finland: Nicaragua

Finland–Nicaragua relations are the bilateral relations between Finland and Nicaragua. Finland is accredited to Nicaragua from its embassy in Mexico City, Mexico. Nicaragua has an honorary consulate in Helsinki.

== Finnish assistance ==
Finland is a significant donor of aid to Nicaragua. In 2007, total aid amounted to around EUR 14.5 million. The cooperation focused on rural development, health care and supporting local government.

In 1992, the Finnish government announced an aid program of US$27.4 million.

In 2006, the Finnish government pledged 4.9 million euros to help the Nicaraguan government integrate the ICT systems of 20 town councils.

In 2008, the Finnish government revoked a 1.95 million euro aid package meant for Nicaragua in protest of what it alleged was a lack of transparency in Nicaragua's national budget and its municipal elections.

In February 2012, Finland made decision to stop development aid to Nicaragua. The main reason was concern over the state of the democracy in Nicaragua.

== State visits ==
In 2004, Finnish President Tarja Halonen visited Nicaragua where she stated that "The Finnish government and Parliament have decided that Nicaragua is one of the main targets of Finnish development aid. However, the visit has shown that Finland is not only giving money - it is also interested in what is happening here."

The Finnish President also made a speech to the National Assembly of Nicaragua on 31 May 2004.

== Agreements ==
In 2003, the two countries signed the Agreement for the Promotion and Reciprocal Protection of Investments.

== See also ==
- Foreign relations of Finland
- Foreign relations of Nicaragua
