= Nicaragua–Syria relations =

Bilateral relations

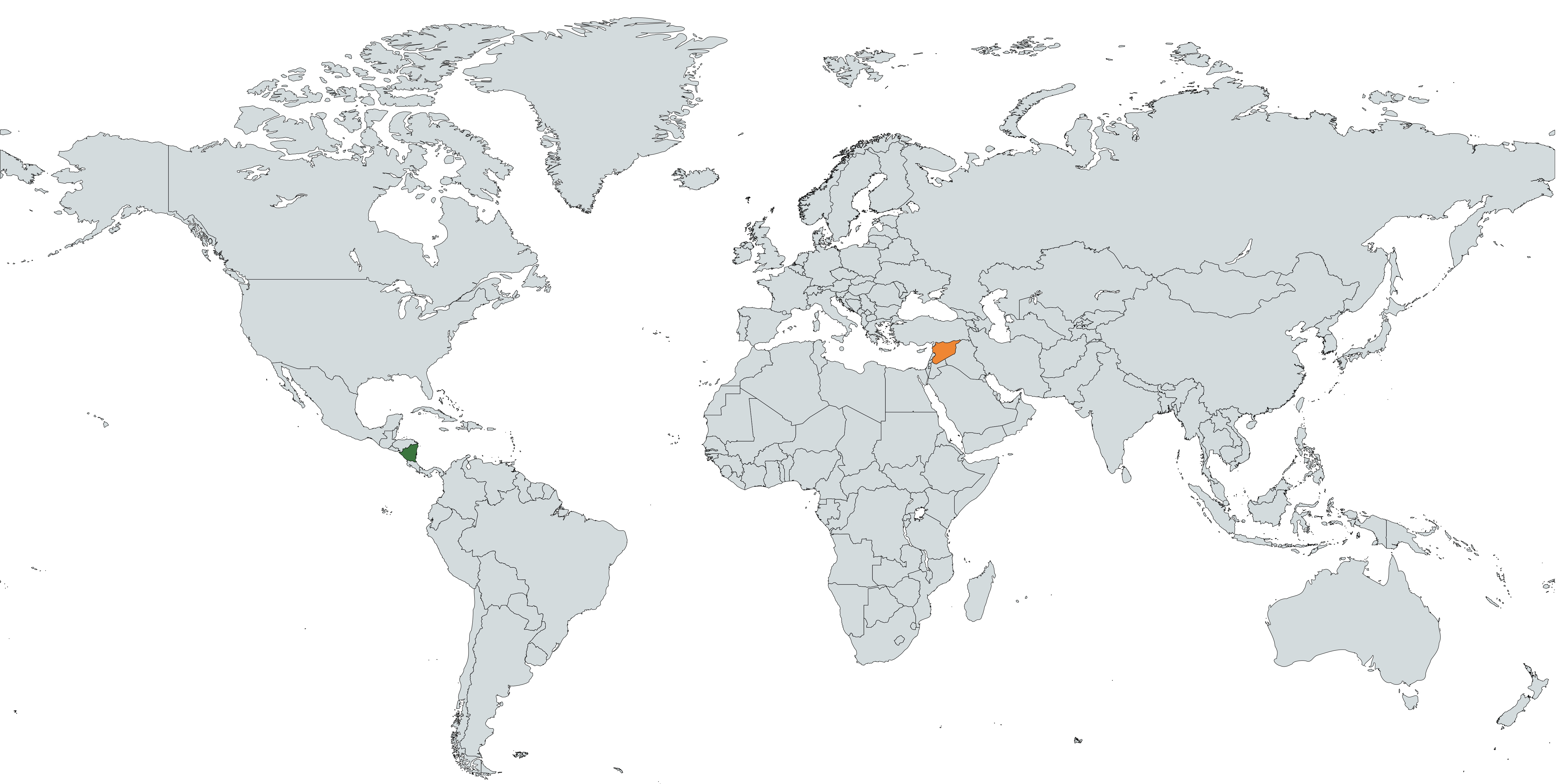

- Nicaragua: Syria

Bilateral relations between Nicaragua and Syria were established on 14 February 1999. Their relationship that evolved over the years, particularly influenced by political developments in both nations and their shared interests in various international forums.

== Historical background ==
Nicaragua and Syria established diplomatic relations in 1999. Syria, under President Hafez al-Assad, supported leftist movements across Latin America, including the Sandinista government.

The relationship was characterized by mutual support for revolutionary movements and shared ideological beliefs.

Nicaragua benefited from Syrian political backing in international forums, particularly within the United Nations.

Nicaragua supported Syrian rights to Israeli-occupied Golan Heights. And had repeatedly voted in favor of the Assad regime in Syria.

== Diplomatic engagement ==
In recent years, Nicaragua and Syria have maintained diplomatic engagements focused on strengthening bilateral cooperation in various sectors, including agriculture, education, and trade. Nicaragua has expressed support for Syria in its fight against external interventions and sanctions imposed by Western countries.

In 2011, during the onset of the Syrian civil war, Nicaragua was one of the few countries that openly supported the Syrian government. Nicaraguan officials condemned foreign interventions and voiced solidarity with Syria's sovereignty.

=== Representation ===
Both countries have non-resident ambassadors to each other.

== Recent developments ==
Nicaragua routinely reaffirms its support for Syria amid ongoing regional tensions. The Nicaraguan government expressed its intention to enhance cooperation in areas such as health and education, emphasizing the importance of solidarity among nations facing external pressures.

Both countries have also collaborated within international organizations, advocating for the right to self-determination and opposing foreign intervention in domestic affairs. This partnership reflects their alignment on key global issues, particularly in the context of U.S. foreign policy in Latin America and the Middle East.

== See also ==
- Foreign relations of Nicaragua
- Foreign relations of Syria
- Non-Aligned Movement
