= Nicaragua–Uruguay relations =

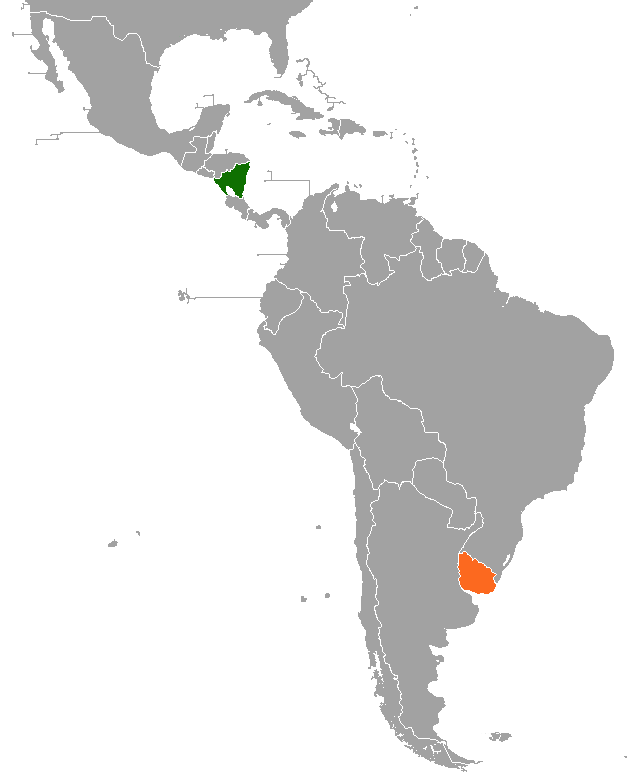

- Nicaragua: Uruguay

Nicaragua and Uruguay share a common history in the fact that both nations were once part of the Spanish Empire. Today, bilateral relations between both nations have taken place primarily in multilateral forums. Both nations are members of the Community of Latin American and Caribbean States, Group of 77, Organization of American States, Organization of Ibero-American States and the United Nations.

== History ==
Both Nicaragua and Uruguay were colonized by Spain. During this period, Nicaragua was governed from the Viceroyalty of New Spain in Mexico City while Uruguay was then part of the Viceroyalty of the Río de la Plata and administered from Buenos Aires. In 1828, Uruguay obtained its independence after the Cisplatine War. In 1841, Nicaragua obtained its independence after the dissolution of the Federal Republic of Central America.

Bilateral relations between both nations have taken place primarily in multilateral forums. In August 1998, Nicaraguan President Arnoldo Alemán paid a visit to Uruguay and met with President Julio María Sanguinetti. In November 2006, Nicaraguan Vice-President paid a visit to Montevideo, Uruguay to attend the 16th Ibero-American Summit. In March 2013, Uruguayan Foreign Minister Luis Almagro paid a visit to Managua and met with President Daniel Ortega.

In 2021, Uruguay closed its embassy in Managua due to budget restraints. However, the embassy was re-opened in 2023.

== Bilateral agreements ==
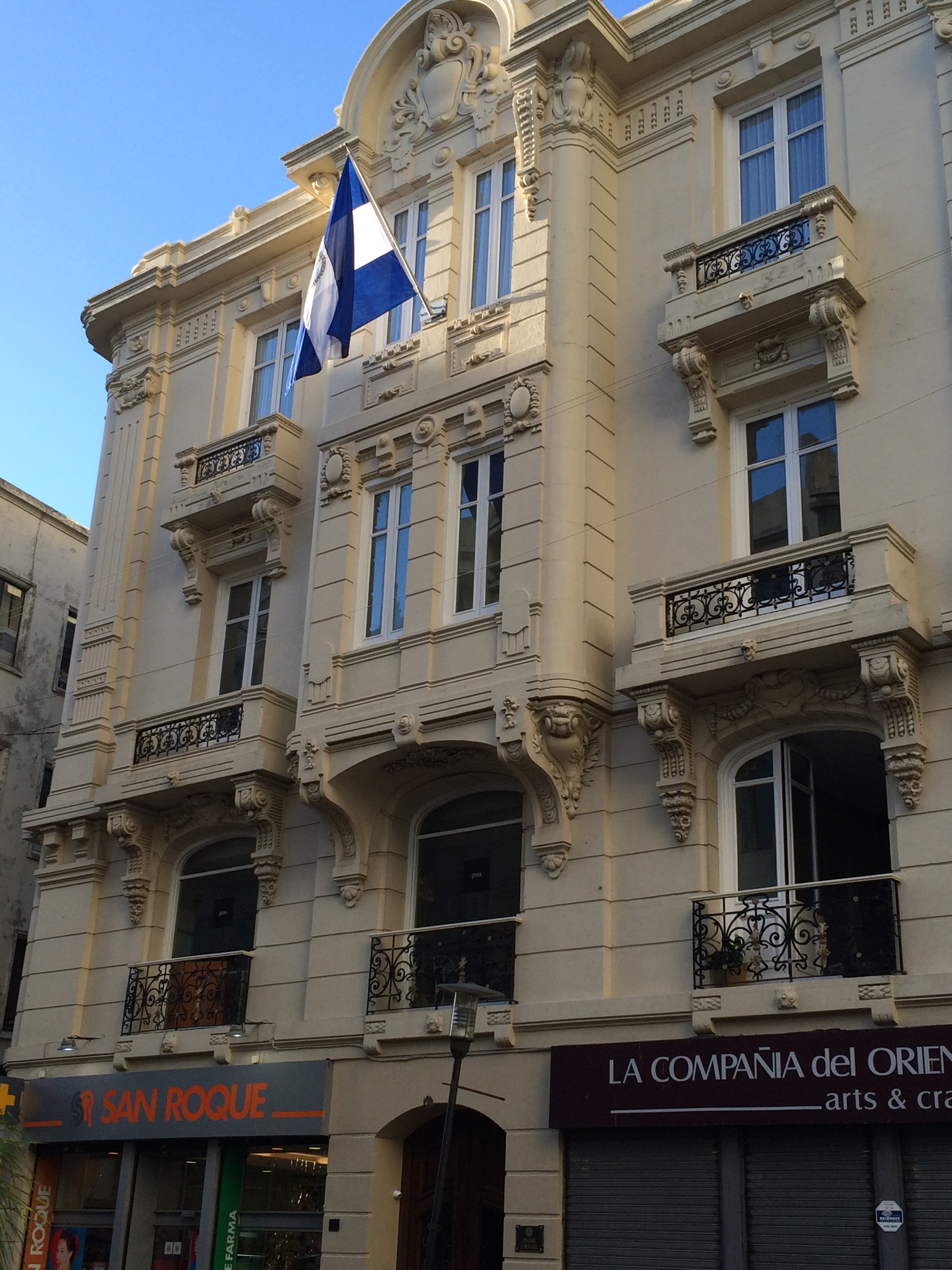
Embassy of Nicaragua in Montevideo

Both nations have signed several agreements such as an Agreement on the elimination of visas for holders of valid passports of any kind of both countries (1993); Memorandum of Understanding of Academic Cooperation between both nations Ministry's of Foreign Affairs (1998); Agreement of Cooperation and Cultural Exchange (1998); Tourism Cooperation Agreement (1998); Agreement for Technical and Scientific Cooperation (1998); and an Agreement of Cooperation on Agricultural Matters (2014).

== Resident diplomatic missions ==
- Nicaragua has an embassy in Montevideo.
- Uruguay is accredited to Nicaragua from its embassy in Guatemala City, Guatemala.

== See also ==
- Foreign relations of Nicaragua
- Foreign relations of Uruguay
