= Nicaragua–Russia relations =

- Russia: Nicaragua

Diplomatic mission
- Embassy of Russia in Managua: Embassy of Nicaragua in Moscow

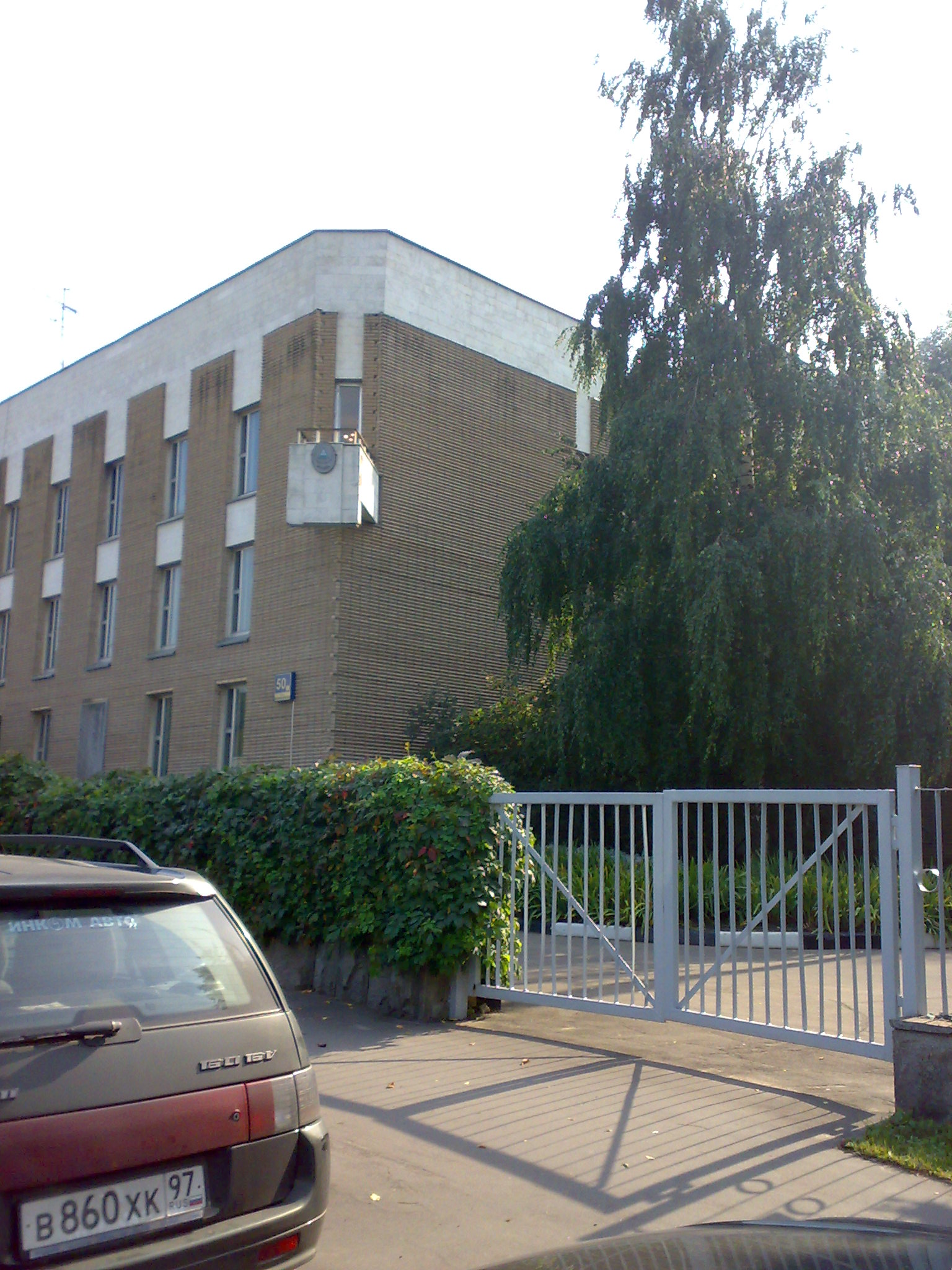
Embassy of Nicaragua in Moscow

Nicaragua–Russia relations are the bilateral relations between Russia and Nicaragua.

== History ==
Nicaragua first recognized the Soviet Union on 18 November 1944. Agreements to open diplomatic missions were signed on October 18, 1979, between Nicaragua and the Soviet Union a few months after the Nicaraguan Revolution. Russia is the main successor to the Soviet Union after the dissolution of the USSR in 1991, so ties have naturally continued with Russia since the Belovezha Accords. Russia has an embassy in Managua. Nicaragua has an embassy in Moscow.

The USSR developed great relations with the Sandinistas after the overthrow of the Somoza family as part of the 1979 Sandinista revolution in Nicaragua, to the point that Victor Volskii, president of the Soviet Association of Friendship with Latin American Countries, called the revolution a "model" for global armed revolution. During the 1980s, the Soviet Union provided full political, economic, military, and diplomatic support to the left wing government of Nicaragua. This was both a reaction to the right-wing Contra resistance movement and the Sandinista government working towards a full-fledged alliance with the Soviet Union. These efforts resulting in Nicaragua receiving free credit, economic subsidies, technological support, and heavy weapon grants.

Soviet economic investments to Nicaragua consisted of both direct aid, economic/industrial investments, and trade. For example, in 1983, Nicaragua received between $200 million and $250 million from the Soviet bloc, with investments ranging from $100 million - $150 million from 1981 to 1984. As further relations with the US deteriorated due to foreign policy of the Reagan administration, Nicaragua relied heavier on Soviet trade. By May 1985, Nicaragua became the second largest importer of Soviet goods (after Cuba), with Soviet exports to Nicaragua growing three times from 1983 to 1984. Nicaragua voted consistently for Communist causes during the 1980s, shown especially with the 1984 Nicaraguan general elections where the Sandinistas garnered 66.78% of the total votes in the nation. While the Soviet Union rapidly withdrew both economic and military investments to various Latin American nations (including Nicaragua) in the beginning of the 1990s leading up to the dissolution of the USSR, Russia continued to invest in the economic, technological, and infrastructural success of Nicaragua.

The Nicaraguan armed forces received a variety of Soviet equipment at no cost, including heavily armed Mi-24 attack helicopters (Hinds), and Mi-17 transport helicopters, along with T-55 main battle tanks, BM-21 "Grad" multiple launch rocket systems, trucks, and various forms of artillery (ranging from 152mm howitzers to anti-aircraft guns). Along with military equipment, the Sandinista government received various forms of support from allied leftists governments' militaries, with there being, as of 1985, "some 8,000 Cubans, 50 Soviets, 35 East Germans, 50 Palestine Liberation Organization and Libyan personnel," and an unknown number of North Korean and Bulgarian foreign advisors and support staff engaging in military, security, medical, and educational (both political and academical) matters to increase the readiness of the Nicaraguan military. Some further 1,000 construction workers also supported in infrastructure development in the country, building and maintaining airfields, radars, dams, bridges, and telecommunication companies.

After Sandinista leader Daniel Ortega returned to power in 2007, positive relations continued with Russia taking over the patron role for Nicaragua. Nicaragua was the second country after Russia to recognize the disputed territories of South Ossetia and Abkhazia. In September 2008, perhaps in response to Nicaragua's support over the breakaway Georgian territories, Russia offered to strengthen ties with Nicaragua and to provide aid to Nicaragua to help rebuild areas damaged by hurricanes.

In December 2008, three Russian warships headed by the destroyer Admiral Chabanenko visited Nicaragua at the invitation of President Daniel Ortega, although Wilfredo Navarro of the opposition Constitutionalist Liberal Party said that without parliamentary approval the naval visit would be a breach of the Constitution as the visit had not received official approval by the Nicaraguan National Assembly. During the visit, Russian officials donated about $200,000 worth of generators and computers to hospitals, police, and the army.

Shortly after, on December 18, 2008, Russia and Nicaragua concluded several bilateral agreements after talks between presidents Dmitry Medvedev and Daniel Ortega in Moscow ended in success, including Memorandums of understanding between the countries' agriculture ministries, and between Roscosmos and Nicaragua's Telecommunications and Postal Service Institute. Russian support has become more important to Nicaragua following withdrawal in late 2008 of US and European aid due to concerns about electoral fraud and handling of human rights and democracy. Russian media, namely RT in Spanish and Sputnik, and Nicaraguan media have fostering mutual cooperation via a memorandum, with collaboration with Sputnik beginning in September 2022 and RT in December 2022. Russia has been critical in providing the Nicaraguan state medias with training and equipment. In April 2009, Nicaragua dropped the requirement for Russian tourists to obtain visas.

After Russia annexed Crimea from Ukraine on 18 March 2014, the Nicaraguan government officially recognized Crimea as a part of Russia.

On July 12, 2014, Vladimir Putin made an official state visit to Nicaragua, meeting in Managua with President Ortega.

In November 2020, Nicaragua opened an honorary consulate on the Crimean peninsula, becoming the first foreign consulate in the region since 2014.

In June 2022, Russian state TV announced that the President of Nicaragua Daniel Ortega invited Russian Armed Forces to enter his country in the second half of 2022. State TV host Olga Skabeeva said: "Its time for Russia to roll out something powerful closer to the American city upon a hill."

On 12 October 2022, Nicaragua was one of only four countries in the UN which did not vote in favor of condemning Russia for its invasion of Ukraine. The resolution was supported by 143 countries while 35 had abstained from voting. Nicaragua had been joined in its opposition to the resolution by North Korea, Syria, and Belarus.

After the 1979 Nicaraguan Revolution, Nicaragua significantly relies on Soviet, Russian, and Warsaw Pact military equipment as a mainstay of its military equipment. Through various talks and agreements, including state visits, Nicaragua was able to receive critical support militarily from Russia. In February 2025, the country received 5 Mil Mi-17 helicopters, 3 Antonov An-26 military-transport aircraft, as well as 18 ZU-23AE modernized air defense artillery systems as donations from Russia. As part of larger defense contracts and agreements, Nicaragua fields a variety of heavy equipment originating from either the USSR or Russia, with one of the newest purchases being 50 T-72B1MS main battle tanks with the first shipments being delivered in 2016. The close-knit relations between the two nations resulted in Nicaragua relying on Russia for 90% of all military imports. Russia still provides military training to Nicaragua, with a military base the opening of a being opened in 2013 housing by 2016 close to 400 Russian military personnel. Nicaragua still operates a variety of AK platforms for its military.

In July 2025 the president of Nicaragua announced the country's recognition over Russia's claim and annexation of Donetsk, Luhansk, Zaporizhzhia and Kherson, marking it the first Latin American country to recognize the claim.

== See also ==
- Foreign relations of Nicaragua
- Foreign relations of Russia
- List of ambassadors of Russia to Nicaragua
