= Nicaragua–Spain relations =

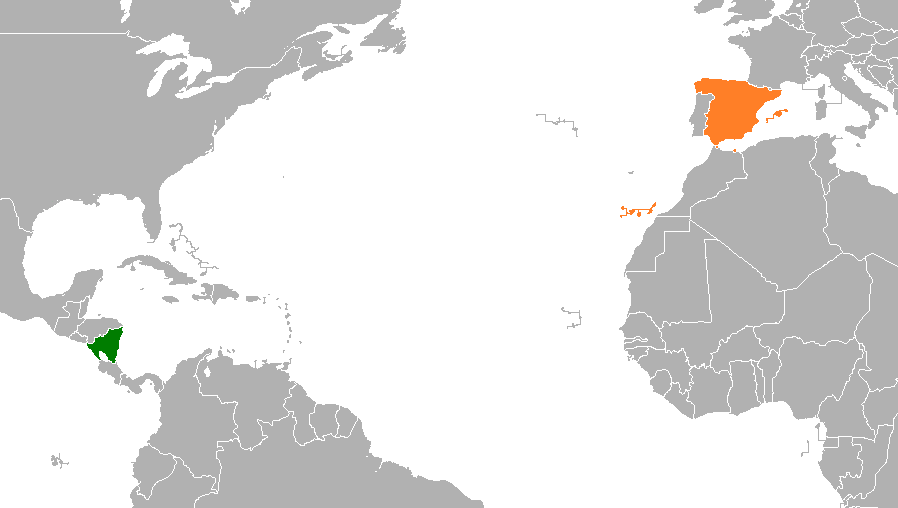

- Nicaragua: Spain

Diplomatic mission
- Nicaraguan embassy, Madrid: Spanish embassy, Managua

Nicaragua and Spain maintain diplomatic relations. Both nations are members of the Association of Academies of the Spanish Language and the Organization of Ibero-American States.

== History ==
=== Spanish colonization ===
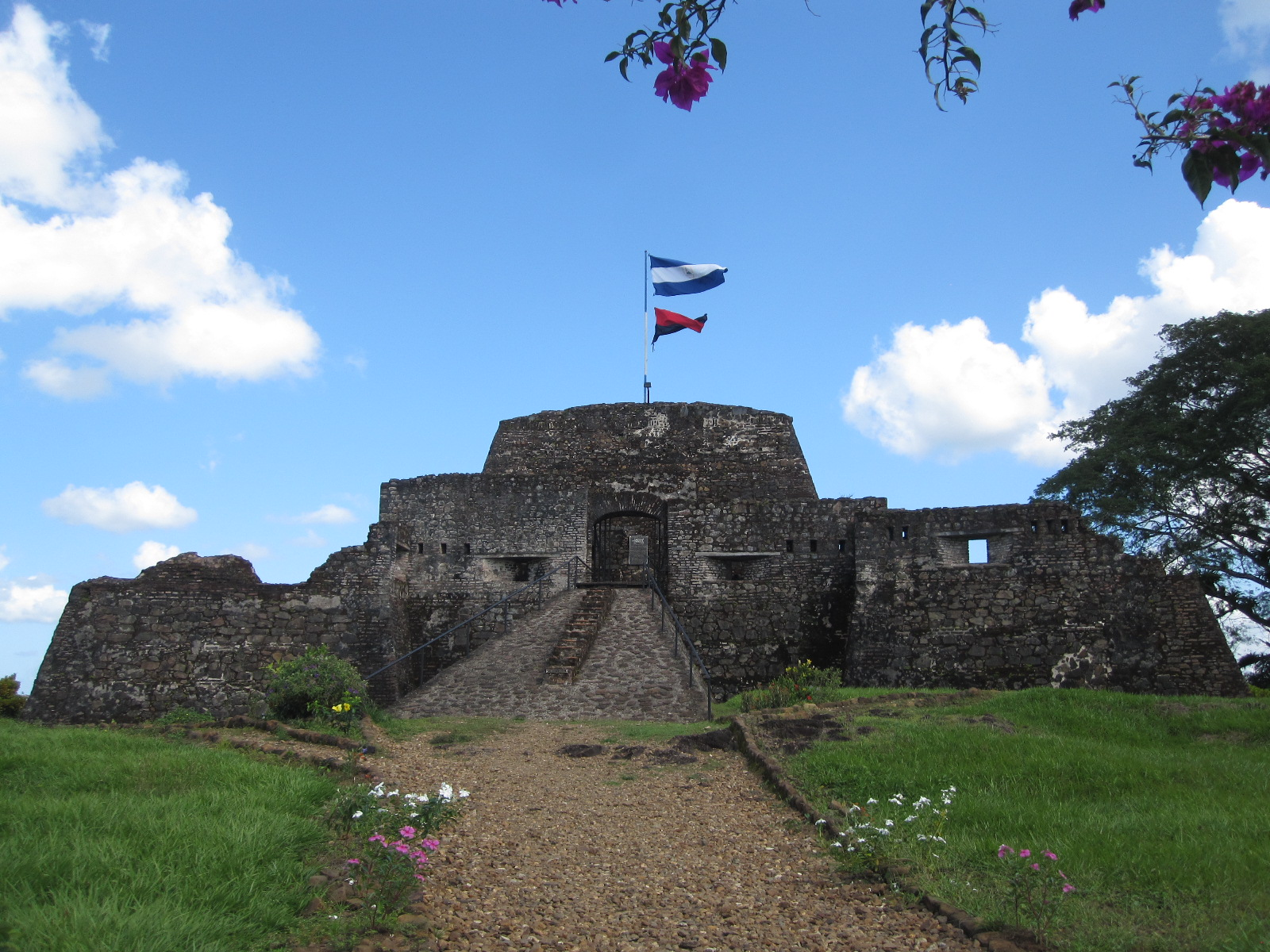
Spanish Fortress of the Immaculate Conception built in 1673 in El Castillo, Nicaragua.

In September 1502, explorer Christopher Columbus arrived to eastern Nicaragua on his fourth voyage to the Americas. In 1522, Spanish conquistador Gil González Dávila arrived to Nicaragua and claimed the territory for Spain. Gil González Dávila named the territory after a chief named Nicarao and combined the name for the Spanish word for water (Agua). In 1524, Spanish conquistador Francisco Hernández de Córdoba founded the first Spanish settlements of Granada and León.

As a result of the Spanish invasion, the native population drastically fell. Within three decades an estimated native population of one million plummeted to a few tens of thousands, as approximately half of the natives died of contagious diseases originally from Europe, and most of the rest were made to work in forced labor in other New World Spanish colonies.

The territory of Nicaragua soon officially became part of the Spanish Empire under the Viceroy of New Spain based in Mexico City and administered by the Captaincy General of Guatemala based in Santiago de Guatemala. For most of Spanish colonization, the territory was mostly neglected. In 1740, Great Britain took over the Mosquito Coast of Nicaragua and held it until 1786.

=== Independence ===
In 1808, Joseph Bonaparte was installed as King of Spain and several Spanish American colonies began to declare their independence from Spain. As Nicaragua and most Central American nations were governed by Mexico City; New Spain declared its independence from Spain in 1810. In 1821, the Plan of Iguala declared Mexico as a constitutional monarchy. Nicaragua declared its own independence from Spain on 15 September 1821 and chose to join the Mexican Empire under Emperor Agustín de Iturbide.

In March 1823, Iturbide resigned as Emperor and Mexico became a republic. Nicaragua decided to separate from Mexico on 1 July 1823. Nicaragua, along with Costa Rica, El Salvador, Guatemala and Honduras formed the Federal Republic of Central America. In 1839 the Central American Federation dissolved and Nicaragua became an independent nation.

=== Post-Independence ===
On 20 March 1851, Nicaragua and Spain officially established diplomatic relations and signed a Treaty of Peace and Friendship. During the Spanish Civil War, Nicaragua officially recognized the government of Francisco Franco.

During the Nicaraguan Revolution (1961-1990), Spain maintained diplomatic relations with the Junta of National Reconstruction which was led by Daniel Ortega. As a condition of relations, Nicaragua promised that the Basque separatist group, ETA, would not be allowed to operate on Nicaraguan soil even though they openly supported the Sandinistas.

In April 1991, King Juan Carlos I of Spain paid his first and only visit to Nicaragua to celebrate the end of the Nicaraguan Revolution. During his visit, he met with Nicaraguan President Violeta Chamorro.

In February 2023, the Spanish government extended an offer to grant Spanish citizenship to any Nicaraguan citizen that may be declared stateless by the Ortega government, building upon an initial proposal extended to 222 specific Nicaraguan individuals expelled to the United States earlier in the month.

Relations were later reset with new ambassadorial appointments in 2023. In 2026, Nicaragua and Spain again ordered the expulsion of each others' ambassadors.

== High-level visits ==
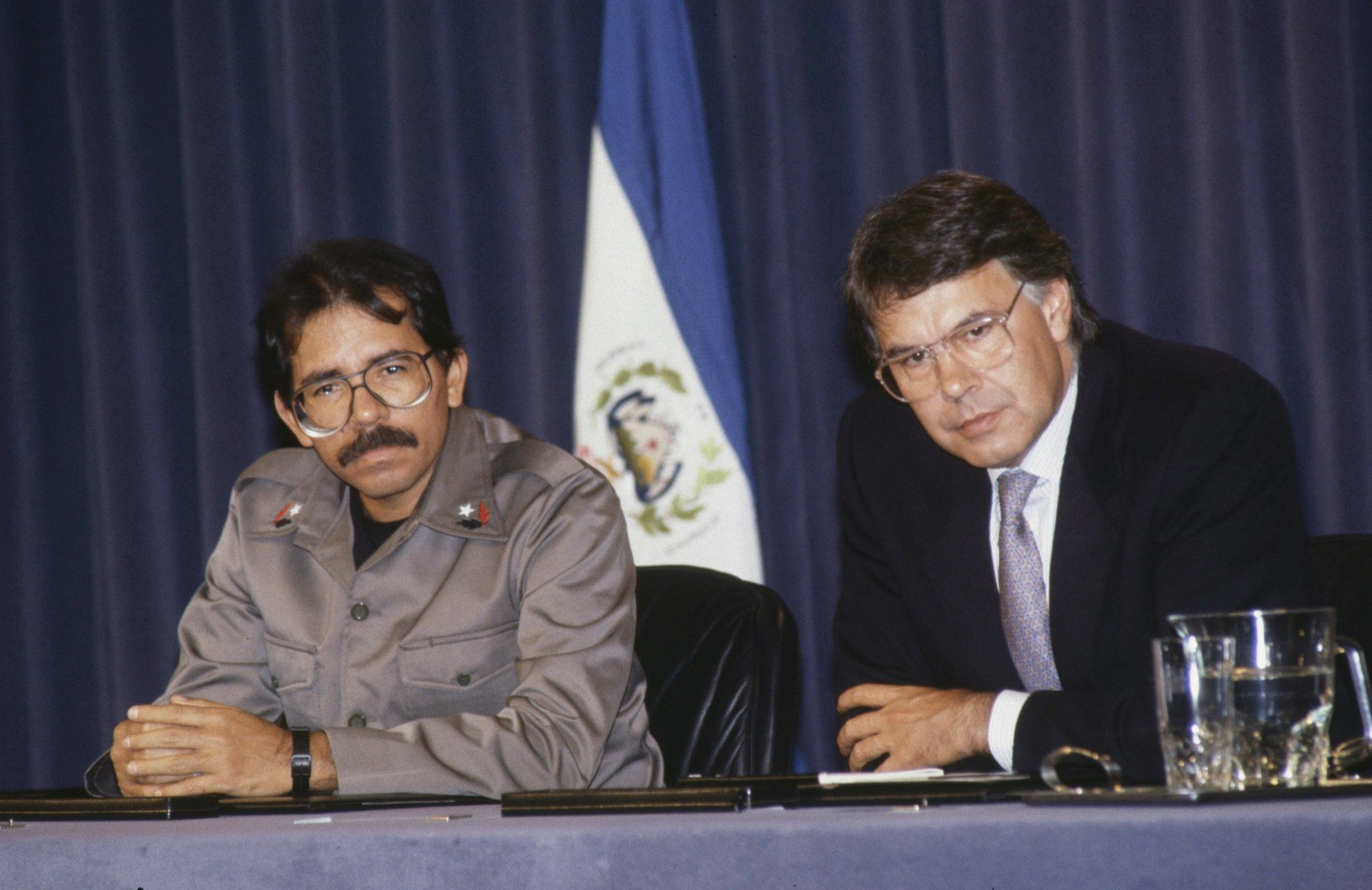
Nicaraguan President Daniel Ortega with Spanish Prime Minister Felipe González in Madrid, 1989.

Presidential visits from Nicaragua to Spain

- President René Schick (1966)
- President Daniel Ortega (1988, 1989)
- Vice President Sergio Ramírez (1988)
- President Violeta Chamorro (1992, 1993)
- President Enrique Bolaños (2004)

Royal and Prime Ministerial visits from Spain to Nicaragua

- King Juan Carlos I (1991)
- Prime Minister Felipe González (1995)
- Prime Minister José María Aznar (1997)
- Crowned Prince Felipe (2007, 2012)

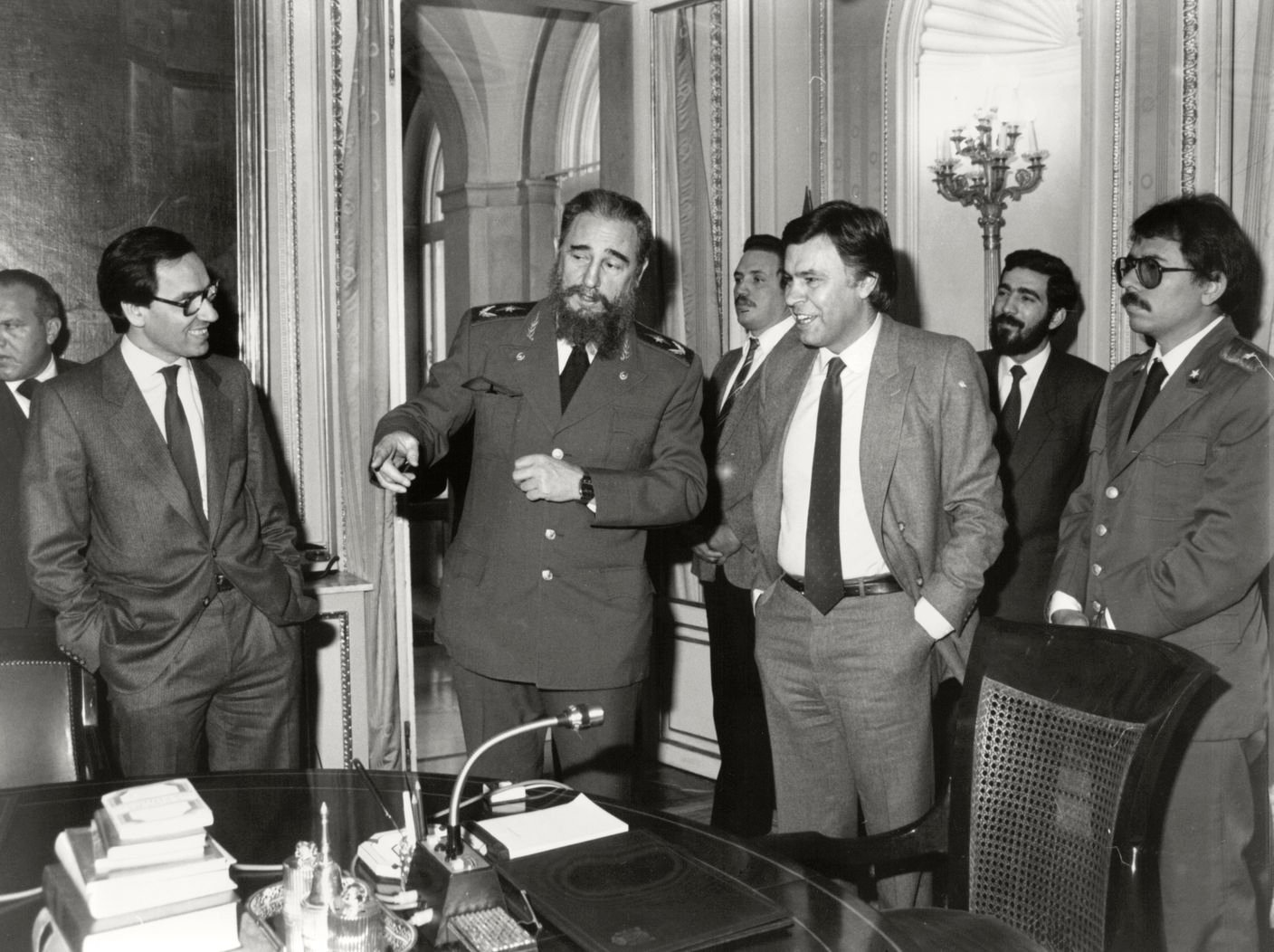
Prime Ministr Felipe González, Cuban President Fidel Castro and Daniel Ortega (at the time Coordinator of the Junta of National Reconstruction) in Madrid; February 1984.

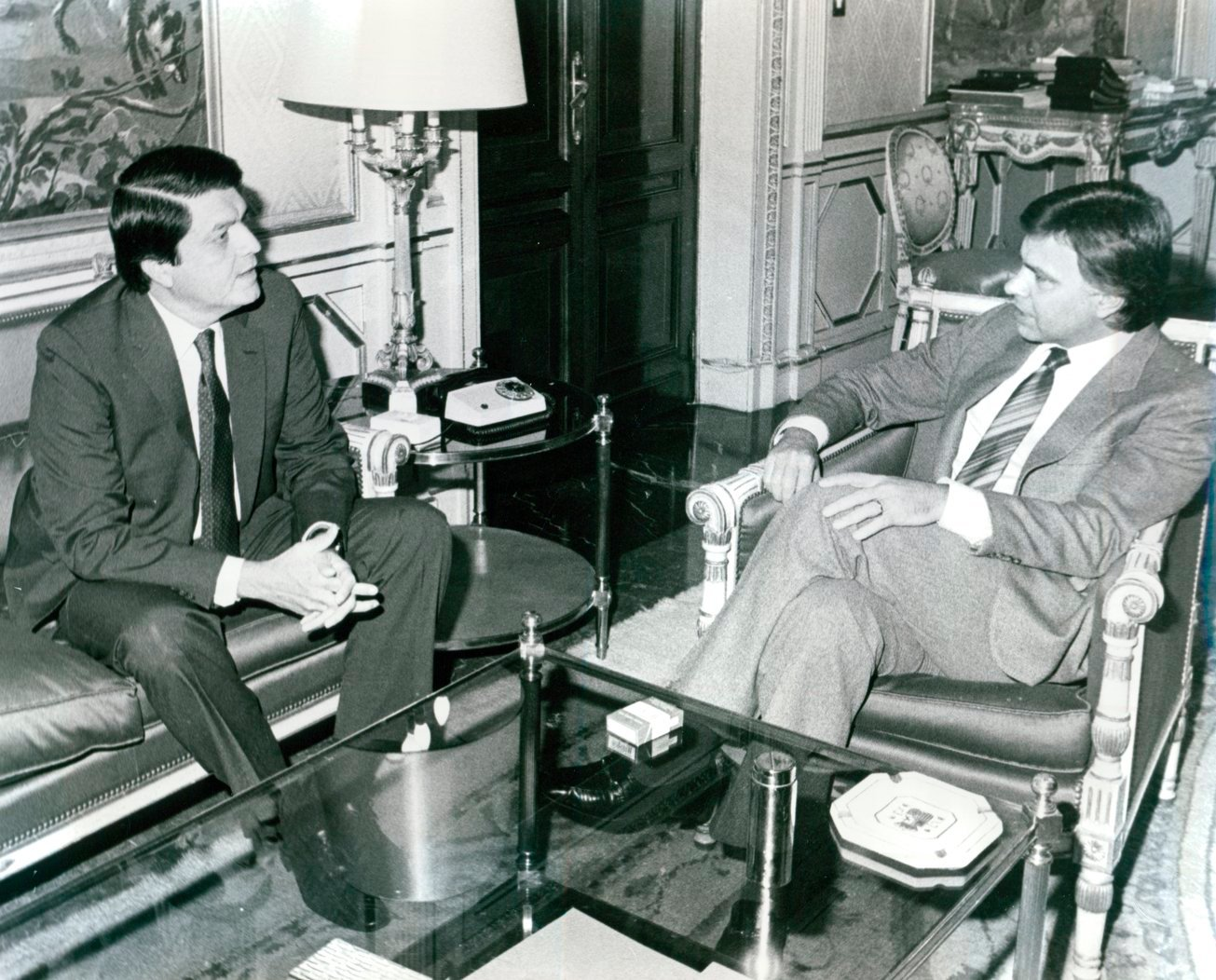
Prime Minister Felipe González and Vice President Sergio Ramírez in Madrid; 1988

== Agreements ==
Both nations have signed several bilateral agreements such as an Agreement on Dual-Nationality (1961); Agreement on Technical Cooperation (1975); Extradition Treaty (1977); Agreement on Cultural, Educational and Scientific Cooperation (1991); Agreement on Air Transportation (1992); Agreement on the reciprocal Promotion and Protection of Investments (1994) and an Agreement on homologation and exchange of Driving Licenses (2012).

== Trade ==
In 2024, trade between Nicaragua and Spain totaled €119 million Euros. Nicaragua's main exports to Spain include: fish, crustaceans and mussels. Spain's main exports to Nicaragua include: machinery, pharmaceuticals, electronic equipment, clothing and food. Spanish multinational companies such as Mapfre and Zara operate in Nicaragua.

== Resident diplomatic missions ==
of Nicaragua in Spain

- Madrid (Embassy)

of Spain in Nicaragua

- Managua (Embassy)

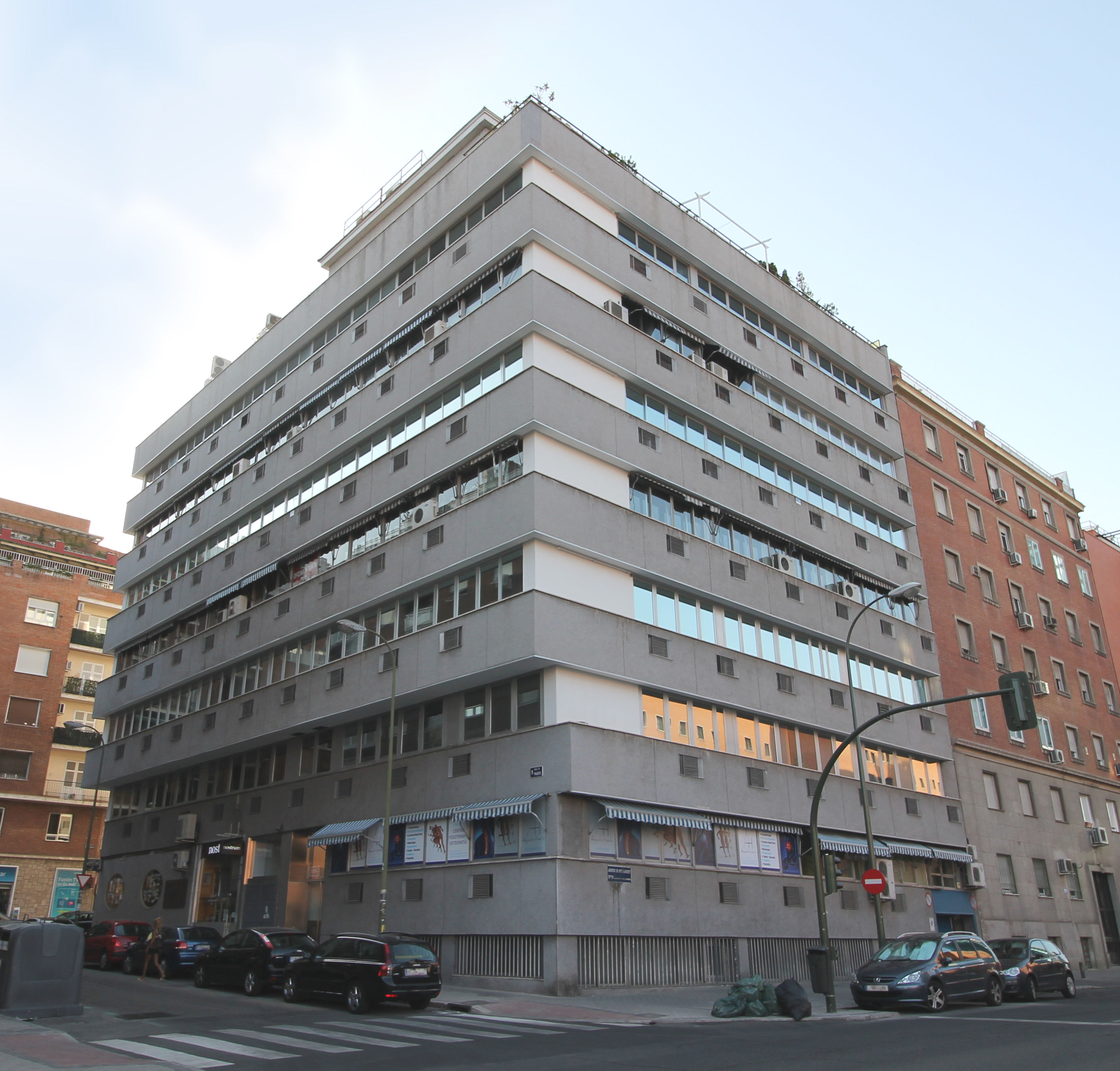
Building hosting the Embassy of Nicaragua in Madrid

== See also ==
- Foreign relations of Nicaragua
- Foreign relations of Spain
