= Enhanced structural adjustment facility =

The Enhanced Structural Adjustment Facility (ESAF) was a program of financial assistance given to poor countries from December 1987 through 1999 through the International Monetary Fund. It replaced the Structural Adjustment Facility (SAF) and was itself replaced by the Poverty Reduction and Growth Facility (PRGF).

During the program's tenure, approximately 10.1 billion dollars were disbursed, through low interest (.5 % annual) loans payable after 5½ years, and due in 10 years.
