= Brazil–Nicaragua relations =

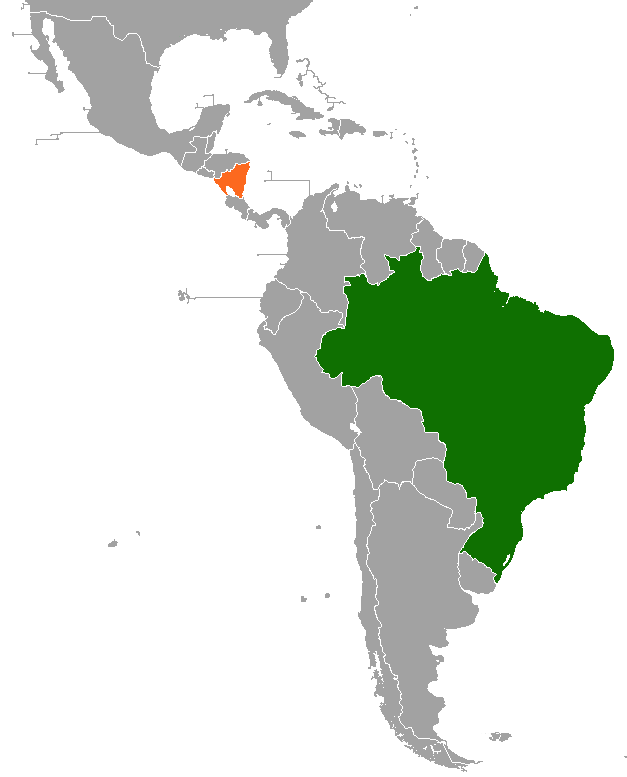

- Brazil: Nicaragua

Bilateral relations between Brazil and Nicaragua have included economic and educational projects undertaken together, and, under Brazil's president Lula, an effort to soften OAS criticism of Nicaragua's government. Both nations are members of the Community of Latin American and Caribbean States, Organization of American States, Organization of Ibero-American States and the United Nations. Brazil has an embassy in Managua. Nicaragua has an embassy in Brasília.

== History ==
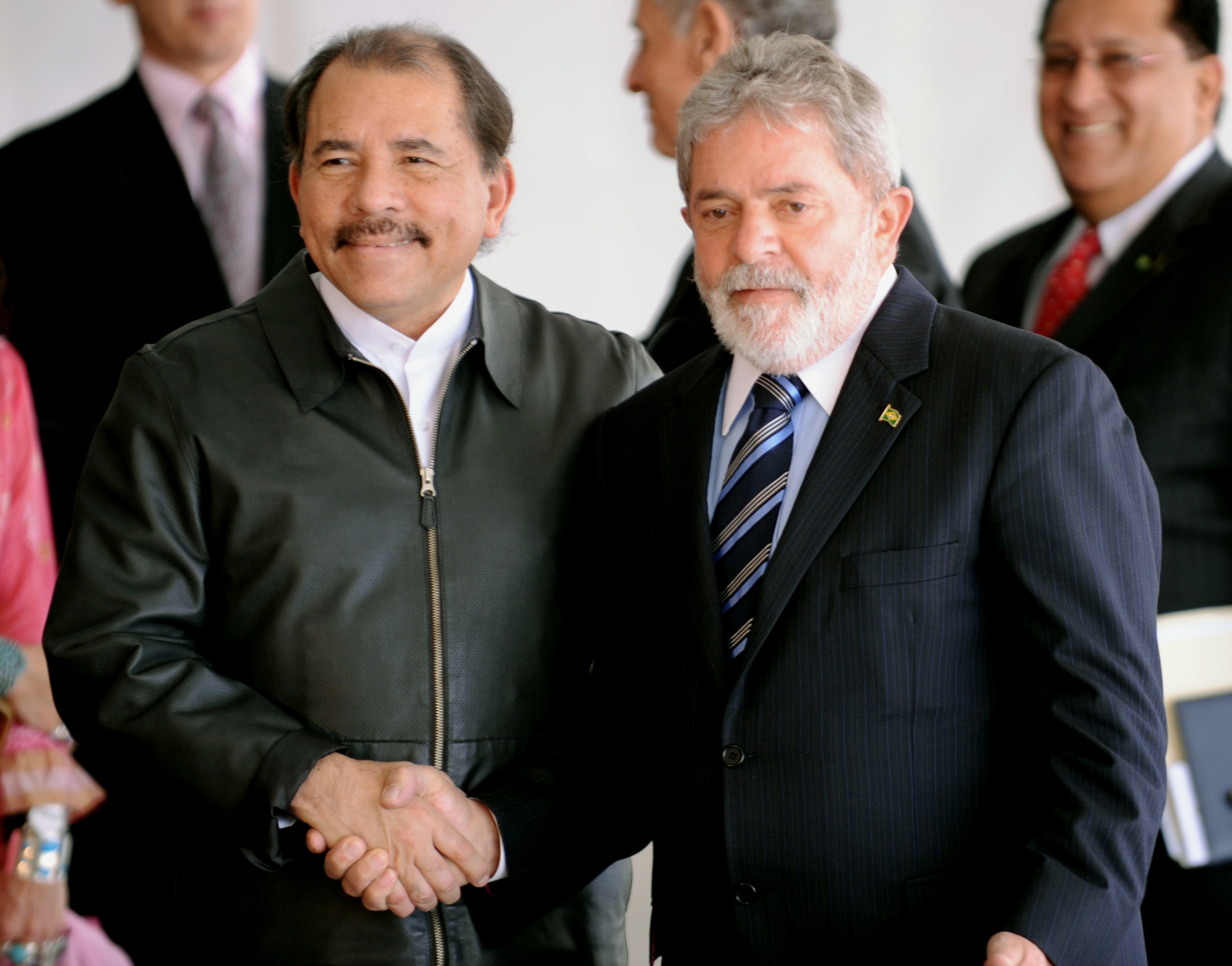
Nicaraguan president Daniel Ortega and Brazilian president Lula, 2010

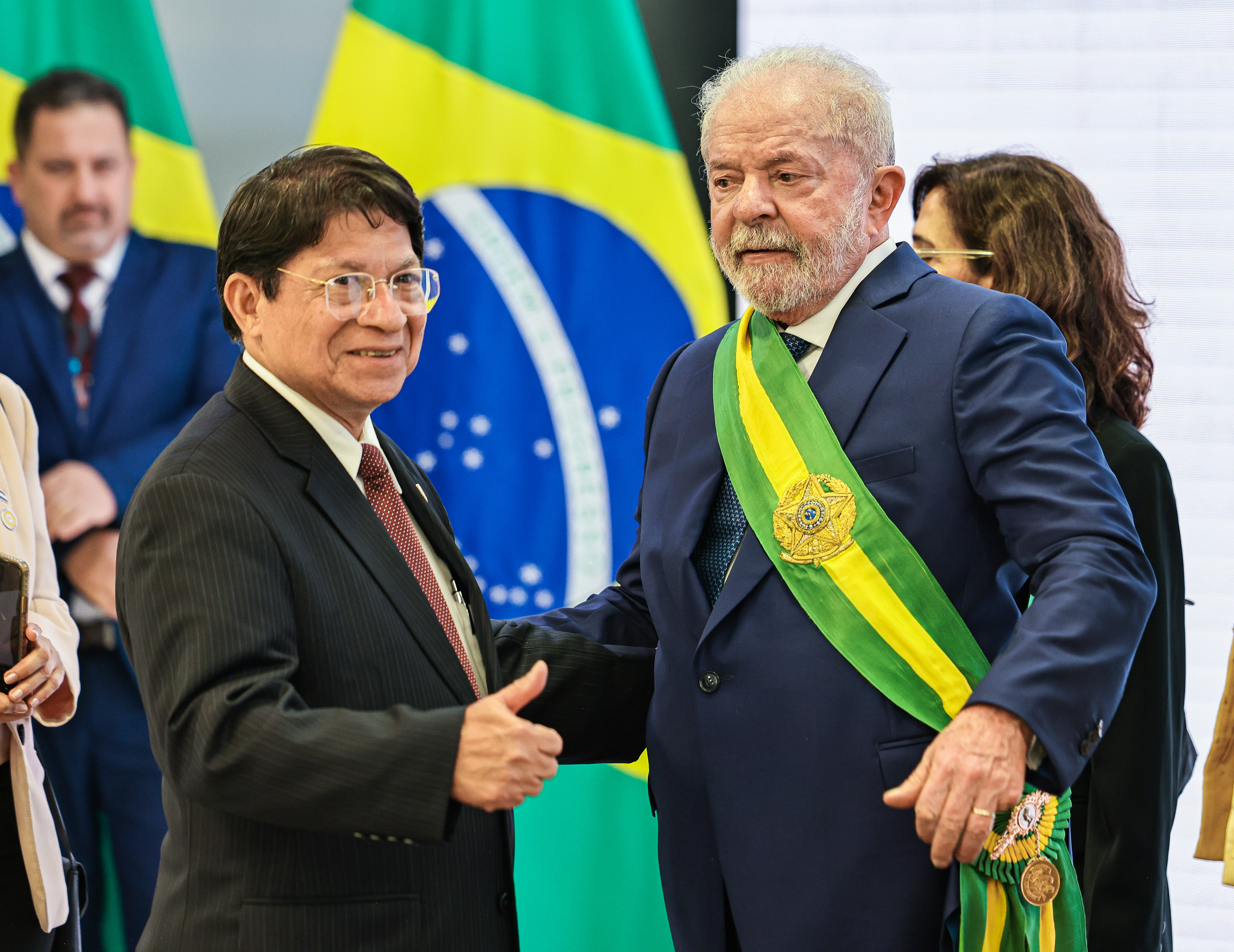
Nicaraguan Foreign Minister Denis Moncada Colindres and Brazilian president Lula, 2023

The Tumarín Dam under construction in Nicaragua will be the largest hydropower dam in Nicaragua and one of the largest in Central America when completed. Brazil's Eletrobras was to fund it with US$1.1 billion under a 20- to 30-year build–operate–transfer agreement. In 2016, the dam project was indefinitely suspended due to Eletrobras' economic and legal troubles, in connection with the Brazilian economic crisis.

In September 2022, Brazilian President Jair Bolsonaro offered refuge in Brazil, the world's largest majority-Catholic nation, to Catholic clerics who he said had endured "cruel persecution" by the leftist leadership in Nicaragua.

In June 2023, at an Organization of American States summit, Brazilian president Lula tried to soften OAS criticism of Nicaragua's government, which was accused of repression and of violations of human rights and property rights. Nicaragua's former ambassador to the OAS, Arturo McFields, said that the proposed softening was "shameful", and that "President Lula is lying and telling another story that never existed in Nicaragua".

In October 2023, the Brazil Ministry of Education partnered with the National Autonomous University of Nicaragua–Managua, the National Council of Universities, the Food and Agriculture Organization of the United Nations, and implemented the training course "School Feeding as a Strategy for a Healthy Life". This was conducted virtually through the Open University Online of Nicaragua.

== Economic relations ==
In 2022, Brazil's exports to Nicaragua totaled $166 million (corn was the top export), and Nicaragua's exports to Brazil totaled $7 million (scrap aluminum was the top export).
