= Denis Rolando Moncada Colindres =

Nicaraguan lawyer and diplomat

His Excellency Denis Rolando Moncada Colindres
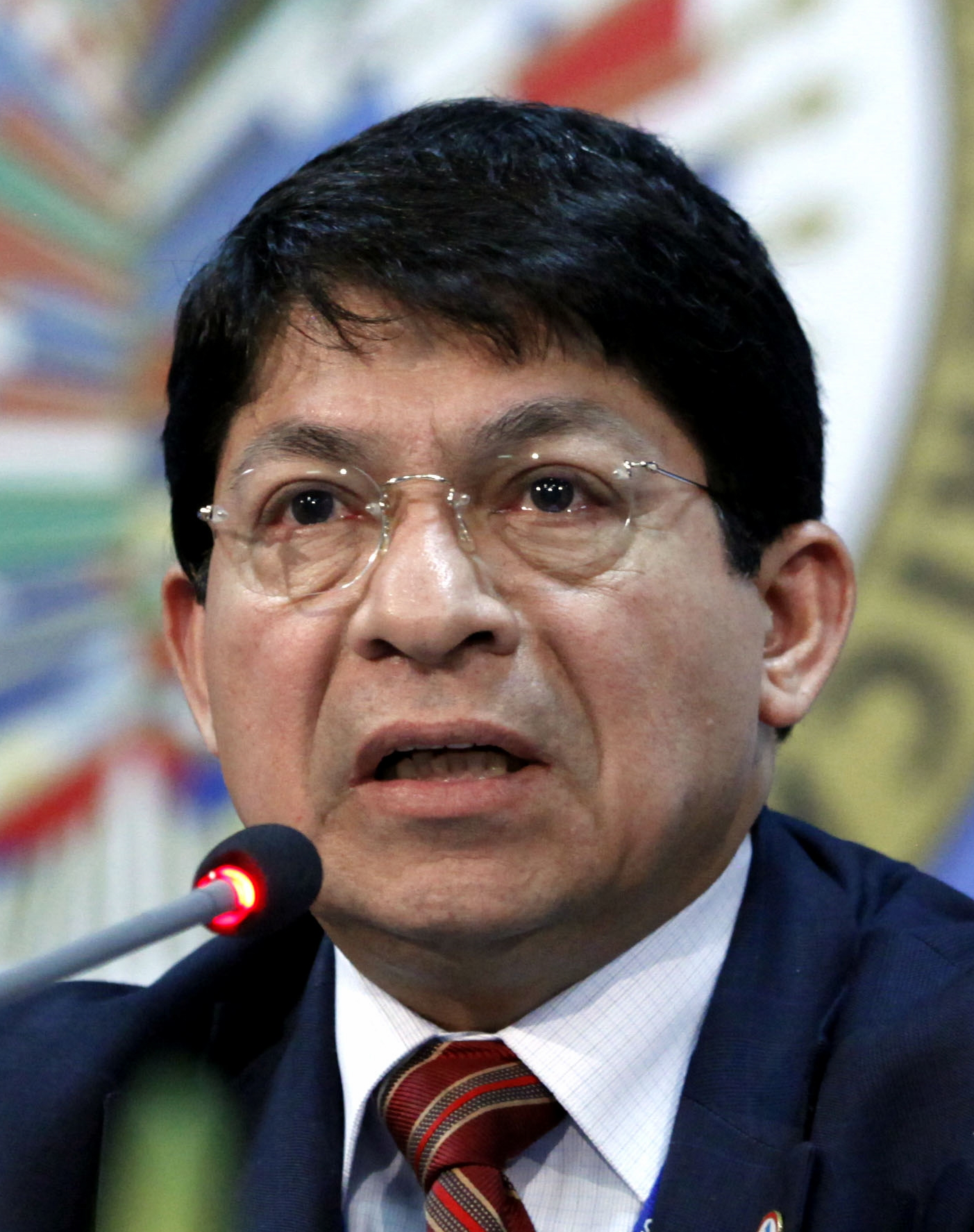
- Denis Rolando Moncada Colindres.

Co-minister of Foreign Affairs of Nicaragua
- Incumbent
- Assumed office 23 September 2025 Serving with Valdrack Jaentschke
- President: Daniel Ortega; Rosario Murillo
- Preceded by: Valdrack Jaentschke (as sole Minister of Foreign Affairs)

Minister of Foreign Affairs of Nicaragua
- In office 17 January 2017 – 7 September 2024
- President: Daniel Ortega
- Preceded by: Samuel Santos López
- Succeeded by: Valdrack Jaentschke

Personal details
- Born: 28 November 1948 (age 77) Murra, Nicaragua
- Party: FSLN
- Spouse: María Delia Guadamuz Núñez
- Children: 4

Denis Rolando Moncada Colindres is a Nicaraguan lawyer and diplomat. He has served as the foreign minister of Nicaragua alongside Valdrack Jaentschke since September 23, 2025. He addressed the United Nations General Assembly in 2025.
