= Poverty Reduction and Growth Facility =

The Poverty Reduction and Growth Facility (PRGF) is an arm of the International Monetary Fund which lends to the world's poorest countries. It was created on September 16, 1999, replacing the Enhanced Structural Adjustment Facility. In 2009 the organization sold 212 metric tons of gold in separate off-market transactions and then gradually sold 191.3 tons of gold to fund the SDR 1¼ billion yearly lending program to the targeted nations.
