= Samuel Santos López =

Nicaraguan politician

Her Excellency Samuel Santos López
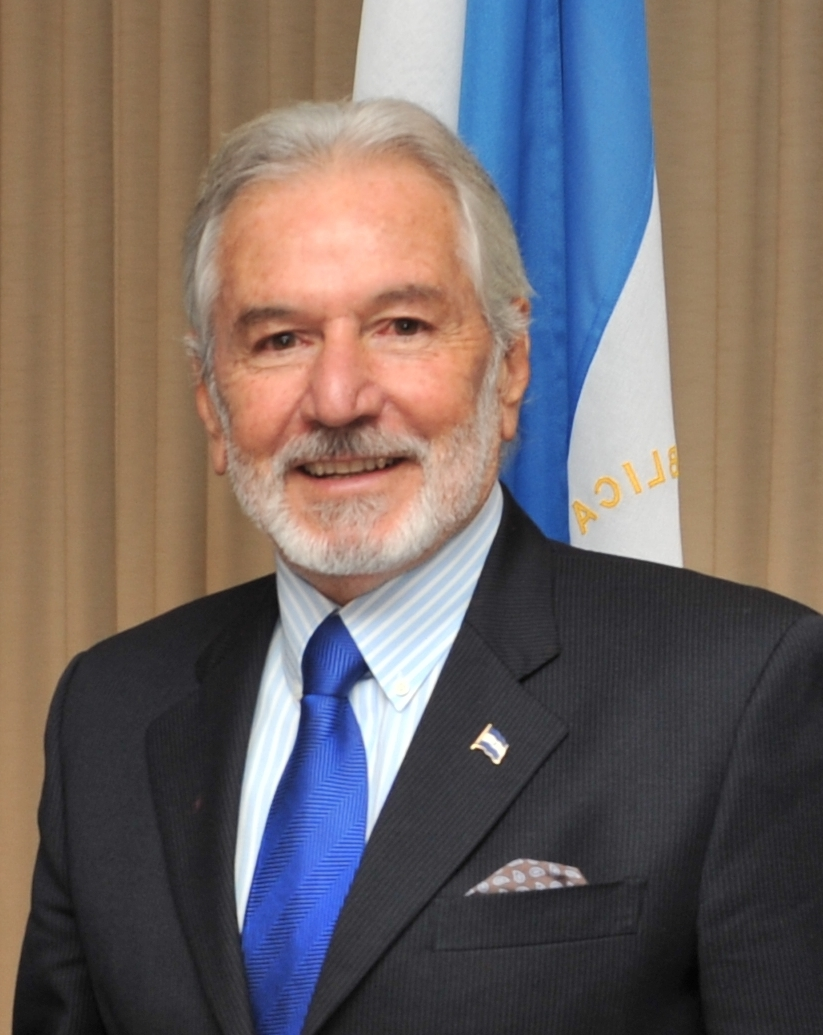
- Samuel Santos López in 2010.

Minister of Foreign Affairs of Nicaragua
- In office 10 January 2007 – 17 January 2017
- President: Daniel Ortega
- Preceded by: Norman José Caldera Cardenal
- Succeeded by: Denis Rolando Moncada Colindres

Personal details
- Born: 13 December 1938 (age 86) Managua, Nicaragua
- Political party: FSLN
- Children: 4

Samuel Santos López (born December 13, 1938) is a Nicaraguan politician, formerly the Minister of Foreign Affairs, appointed to the post on January 10, 2007 until 2017. He is also currently a director of the Bolsa de Valores de Nicaragua (Stock Exchange of Nicaragua).

== Biography ==
Santos Lopez was born in Managua, Nicaragua, to Samuel Santos-Fernandez and Lucila Lopez-Bermudez.

He served as Mayor of Managua from 1980 to 1985, participating in a debate with New York City Mayor Ed Koch in 1983.

He is a member of the Sandinista National Liberation Front, and is involved with a number of businesses and organisations.

During his tenure as Minister of Foreign Affairs, Santos López has been involved in a maritime border dispute with Colombia.

On 13 April 2010, Santos López was awarded the Order of Friendship by President of South Ossetia Eduard Kokoity, "For a great contribution to the development of friendly relations among the nations, and actively support the independence of South Ossetia, and strengthening its international authority". Nicaragua was one of the first countries to recognize South Ossetian independence.

== See also ==
- List of foreign ministers in 2017
- Foreign relations of Nicaragua

Political offices
Preceded by Norman José Caldera Cardenal	Foreign Minister of Nicaragua; January 10, 2007 – 2017	Succeeded by Denis Moncada
