= List of ambassadors of Nicaragua =

Flag of the Republic of Nicaragua

This is a list of ambassadors of the Republic of Nicaragua to individual nations of the world, to international organizations, and to past nations, as well as ambassadors-at-large.

Ambassadors are nominated by the President and confirmed by the Nicaraguan National Assembly. An ambassador can be appointed during a recess, but can only serve until the end of the next session of the national assembly, unless subsequently confirmed. Ambassadors serve “at the pleasure of the President”, meaning they can be dismissed at any time.

An ambassador may be a career Foreign Service Officer or a political appointee. In most cases, career foreign service officers serve a tour of approximately three years per ambassadorship, whereas political appointees customarily tender their resignations upon the inauguration of a new president. As embassies fall under the Ministry of Foreign Affairs of Nicaragua (Chancellery of Nicaragua) jurisdiction, ambassadors answer to the Foreign Ministers of Nicaragua to the President of Nicaragua.

Host country	List	Ambassador	Website	Confirmed
Afghanistan	List	Michael Campbell	Ambassador resident in Beijing	June 21, 2024
Argentina	List			
Armenia	List	Juan Vasquez-Araya	Ambassador resident in Moscow	November 4, 2015
Australia	List	Saúl Arana-Castellón	Ambassador resident in Tokyo	
Austria	List	Sabra Amari Murillo Centeno	Vienna	July 16, 2021
Angola	List	Darling Ríos	Luanda	February 28, 2024
Azerbaijan	List	Juan Vasquez-Araya	Ambassador resident in Moscow	November 4, 2015
(The Bahamas) Bahamas	List	Leyla Argüello-Olivas Gröns	Ambassador resident in Miami.	January 15, 2007
Barbados	List	Ramon Leets-Castillo	Ambassador resident in Caracas	March 29, 2012
Belarus	List	Juan Vásquez-Araya,	Ambassador resident in Moscow	May 10, 2011
Belgium	List	César Augusto Castañeda Lacayo	Brussels	November 30, 2023
Belize	List	Gilda Bolt-González,	Belice City	January 10, 2017
Bolivia	List	Elías Chévez-Obando,	La Paz	June 2014
Bosnia and Herzegovina	List	Adeline Gröns-Schindler de Argüello-Olivas	Ambassador is resident in Managua.	January 16, 2007
Brazil	List	Lorena Carmen-Martínez	Brasília	August 1, 2013
Bulgaria	List	Juan Vásquez-Araya	Ambassador resident in Moscow	
Canada	List	Maurizio Gelli	Ottawa	November 1, 2017
Chile	List	María Robleto-Aguilar	Chile	March 5, 2011
China	List	Michael Campbell	Beijing	May 18, 2023
Colombia	List	Yara Pérez Calero	Bogota	February 3, 2016
Costa Rica	List	Harold Rivas-Reyes	San José	January 23, 2015
Croatia	List	Adeline Gröns-Schindler de Argüello-Olivas	Ambassador is resident in Managua.	January 13, 2007
Cuba	List	Luis Cabrera-González,	Havana	July 20, 2007
Czech Republic	List	Mauricio Lautaro Sandino Montes	Ambassador resident in Brussels.Prague	July 23, 2014
Denmark	List	Ricardo Alvarado Noguera	Ambassador resident in Helsinki.	August 1, 2013
Dominican Republic	List	Yaosca Calderon Martin	Santo Domingo	November 14, 2017
Ecuador	List	Aída Leticia Talavera Aráuz	Quito	February 16, 2017
Egypt	List	Mohamed Lashtar,	Cairo	December 13, 2017
El Salvador	List			
Equatorial Guinea	List			
Estonia	List	Ricardo Alvarado Noguera	Ambassador resident in Helsinki.	August 5, 2015
Ethiopia	List	Hamed Hassan Hosny Aly, Chargé d'Affaires a.i.	Chargé d'Affaires resident in Cario	
Finland	List	Ricardo Alvarado-Noguera	Helsinki	June 24, 2015
France	List	Ruth Tapia-Roa	Paris	September 16, 2014
Georgia		No diplomatic relations since 2008.		
Germany	List	Karla Beteta-Brenes	Berlin	August 1, 2013
Ghana	List			
Greece	List	Alvaro Robelo Gonzalez	Ambassador resident in Rome.	August 1, 2013
Grenada	List	Valdrack Ludwing Jaentschke Whitaker	Ambassador resident in Managua.	May 5, 2016
Guatemala	List	Silvio Mora	Guatemala City	September 16, 2014
Guyana	List	Lorena Carmen-Martínez	Ambassador resident in Brasília.	
Haiti	List	Valdrack Ludwing Jaentschke Whitaker	Ambassador resident in Managua.	May 7, 2016
Holy See (Vatican City)	List	Jose Cuadra Chamorro	Vatican City	January 1, 2007
Honduras	List	Orlando Gómez Zamora	Tegucigalpa	February 17, 2016
Iceland	List	Vacant; Sandra Gabriela Estrada Guido Chargé d'Affaires a.i.	Chargé d'Affaires resident in Stockholm.	
India	List	Vacant since July 19, 2010; Chargé d'Affaires a.i.		
Iran	List	Mario Barquero Baltodano	Tehran	June 1, 2008
(Republic of Ireland) Ireland	List	Guisell Morales Echaverry	Ambassador resident in London.	September 18, 2014
Israel	List	Vacant no ambassador since June 1, 2010 (relations currently restored)		June 1, 2010
Italy	List	Mónica Robelo-Raffone	Rome	August 1, 2013
Ivory Coast	List			
Jamaica	List	David Sidney-Mcfield	Kingston	November 20, 2014
Japan	List	Saúl Arana-Castellón	Tokyo	October 16, 2013
Jordan	List	Oscar Mazier-Aranda	Amman	February 26, 2017
Kenya	List	Vacant since February 26, 2015; Hamed Hassan Hosny Aly, Chargé d'Affaires a.i.		February 26, 2015
Kuwait	List	Mohamed Lashtar	Kuwait City	December 13, 2017
Latvia	List	Mauricio Sandino-Montes	Ambassador resident in Helsinki.	June 24, 2015
Libya	List	Mario Barquero-Baltodano	Ambassador resident in Tehran.	May 23, 2011
Lithuania	List	Ricardo Alvarado-Noguera	Ambassador Resident in Helsinki	January 2, 2013
Liechtenstein	List	Hernán Estrada-Román,Ambassador resident in Geneva.	Vaduz	June 24, 2015
Luxembourg	List	César Augusto Castañeda Lacayo, Ambassador Resident in Brussels	Luxembourg	February 26, 2010
Mexico	List	Tamara Hawkins Lefevre de Brenes-Icabalceta	Mexico City	August 4, 2011
Nauru	List	Adeline Gröns-Schindler de Argüello-Olivas	Ambassador is resident in Managua.	May 19, 2009
Netherlands	List	Carlos Argüello Gomez	The Hague	January 13, 1983
North Korea	List	Juan-Vásquez Araya	Ambassador Resident in Moscow	August 4, 2011
Norway	List	Vacant since September 28, 2013; Sandra Gabriela Estrada Guido, Chargé d'Affaires a.i.		June 2013
Panama	List	Marvin Roberto Ortega Rodríguez	Panama	September 30, 2016
Paraguay	List	Maurizio Alberto-Gelli	Asunción	November 18, 2014
Peru	List	Marcela Pérez-Silva	Lima	June 19, 2014
Poland	List	Karla Luzette Beteta Brenes	Ambassador is resident in Berlin.	August 5, 2015
Portugal	List	Ruth Tapia-Roa	Ambassador is resident in Paris.	October 13, 2013
Russia	List	Juan Ernesto Vásquez-Araya	Moscow	July 31, 2014
Rwanda	List	Adeline Gröns-Schindler de Argüello-Olivas	Ambassador is resident in Managua.	October 13, 1998
Saint Kitts and Nevis	List	David Sidney Mcfield	Ambassador is resident in Kingston.	March 29, 2012
Saint Lucia	List	David Sidney Mcfield	Ambassador is resident in Kingston.	March 29, 2012
Saint Vincent and the Grenadines	List	David Sidney Mcfield	Ambassador is resident in Kingston.	March 29, 2011
Sierra Leone	List			
Solomon Islands	List	Adeline Gröns-Schindler de Argüello-Olivas	Ambassador is resident in Managua.	May 9, 2009
South Africa	List			
South Korea	List	Jorge Arnesto-Alm	Seoul	September 18, 2014
Spain	List	Augusto C. Zamora Rodriguez	Madrid	August 19, 2012
Suriname	List	Valdrack Ludwing Jaentschke Whitaker	Ambassador resident in Managua.	January 7, 2016
Sweden	List	Veronica Rojas		July 1, 2017
Switzerland	List	Hernán Estrada Román	Geneva	May 13, 2007
Syria	List	Mario Barquero Baltodano,	Ambassador resident in Tehran.	April 13, 2007
Tanzania	List			
Trinidad and Tobago	List	Ramón Leets-Castillo	Ambassador is resident in Caracas.	
Tuvalu	List	Adeline Gröns-Schindler de Argüello-Olivas	Ambassador is resident in Managua.	June 9, 2008
Turkey	List	Mario Barquero Baltodano	Ambassador is resident in Tehran.	September 17, 2014
United Kingdom	List	Guisell Morales Echaverry	London	August 1, 2013
United States	List	Francisco Campbell Hooker	Washington D.C.	May 1, 2010
Uruguay	List	Orlando Gomez	Montevideo	December 10, 2017
Vanuatu	List	Adeline Gröns-Schindler de Argüello-Olivas	Ambassador is resident in Managua.	May 9, 2009
Venezuela	List	Ramón Leets-Castillo	Caracas	July 7, 2014
Zimbabwe	List	Nadeska Cuthbert	Harare	February 7, 2024

== Current Nicaraguan ambassadors to limited recognition states ==
Current ambassadors from Nicaragua to limited recognition states:

Abkhazia	List	Juan Ernesto Vásquez Araya	Ambassador resident in Moscow	July 31, 2014
Kosovo	The Republic of Kosovo is not recognized by Nicaragua but is recognized by 108 United Nations member states.			
Northern Cyprus	The Turkish Republic of Northern Cyprus is not recognized by Nicaragua or by the United Nations.			
Palestine	List	Roberto Morales Hernández	Ramallah	August 16, 2023
Sahrawi Arab Democratic Republic	List	Carlos Eduardo Díaz Moreira	Ambassador resident in New York City	May 19, 2024
Somaliland	The Republic of Somaliland is not recognized by Nicaragua or by the United Nations.			
South Ossetia	List	Juan Ernesto Vásquez Araya	Ambassador resident in Moscow	July 31, 2014
Transnistria	The Pridnestrovian Moldavian Republic is not recognized by Nicaragua or by the United Nations.			

== Ambassadors to international organizations ==
Current ambassadors from Nicaragua to international organizations:

Host organization	List	Location	Ambassador	Website	Confirmed
European Union	List	Brussels, Belgium	Richard Montiel Reyes	Brusseles	August 1, 2013
United Nations	List	Geneva, Switzerland	Hernán Estrada Román	Geneva	September 16, 2014
International Court of Justice	List	The Hague, Netherlands	Carlos Argüello Gomez	The Hague	January 21, 1983
United Nations	List	New York City, United States	María Rubiales de Chamorro	New York City	October 16, 2007
Organization of American States	List	Washington D.C., United States	Denis Moncada Colindres	OEA	October 1, 2007
