= Nadeska Cuthbert =

Nicaraguan politician and diplomat

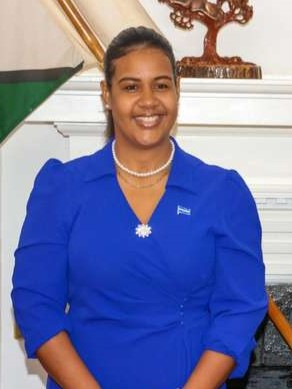

Nicaragua Ambassador to India
- Incumbent
- Assumed office 14 May 2026
- President: Daniel Ortega; Rosario Murillo

Ambassador of Nicaragua to Zimbabwe with concurrent accreditation to Burundi, Malawi, Rwanda, and Zambia
- In office June 2024 – May 2026

Deputy Mayor of Corn Island
- In office 10 January 2018 – 30 January 2024

Personal details
- Born: Nadeska Imara Cuthbert Carlson; May 14, 1986 (age 40) Corn Islands, Nicaragua
- Party: Sandinista National Liberation Front
- Education: John Brown University
- Occupation: Diplomat
- Profession: Business Administration and International Business

Nadeska Cuthbert (born 14 May 1986, on Great Corn Island) is a Nicaraguan politician and diplomat. She was previously the Deputy Mayor of Corn Island in the South Caribbean Coast Autonomous Region of Nicaragua. As of May 2026, she is the Ambassador of Nicaragua in India.

== Early life and education ==
Cuthbert was born in Corn Island on 14 May 1986. She holds a degree in Business Administration and International Business from the John Brown University.

== Career ==
Cuthbert started her political career in January 2018 when elected Deputy Mayor of Corn Island, after the third-term victory of Cleaveland Webster as Mayor representing the Sandinista National Liberation Front Party. In February 2024 she was appointed by the Nicaraguan President, Daniel Ortega, as Chargé d'affaires of the government of Nicaragua unto the government of Zimbabwe. In June 2024, after presenting her letter of credence to the President of Zimbabwe, Emmerson Mnangagwa, she became the first Nicaraguan Ambassador in the African country.

She was later accredited as non-resident concurrent ambassador to the republics of Rwanda, Malawi, Burundi and Zambia.

After serving in East Africa, Cuthbert was designated as resident Ambassador of Nicaragua in India in May 2026.
