= List of diplomatic missions in Nicaragua =

This is a list of diplomatic missions in Nicaragua. The capital, Managua, hosts 30 embassies. Several other countries have ambassadors accredited from other regional capitals. Its role as a promoter of Third World causes during the Cold War led to the development of close ties with many non-aligned and socialist-leaning countries around the globe; other countries have ambassadors accredited from developing countries.

This listing excludes honorary consulates.

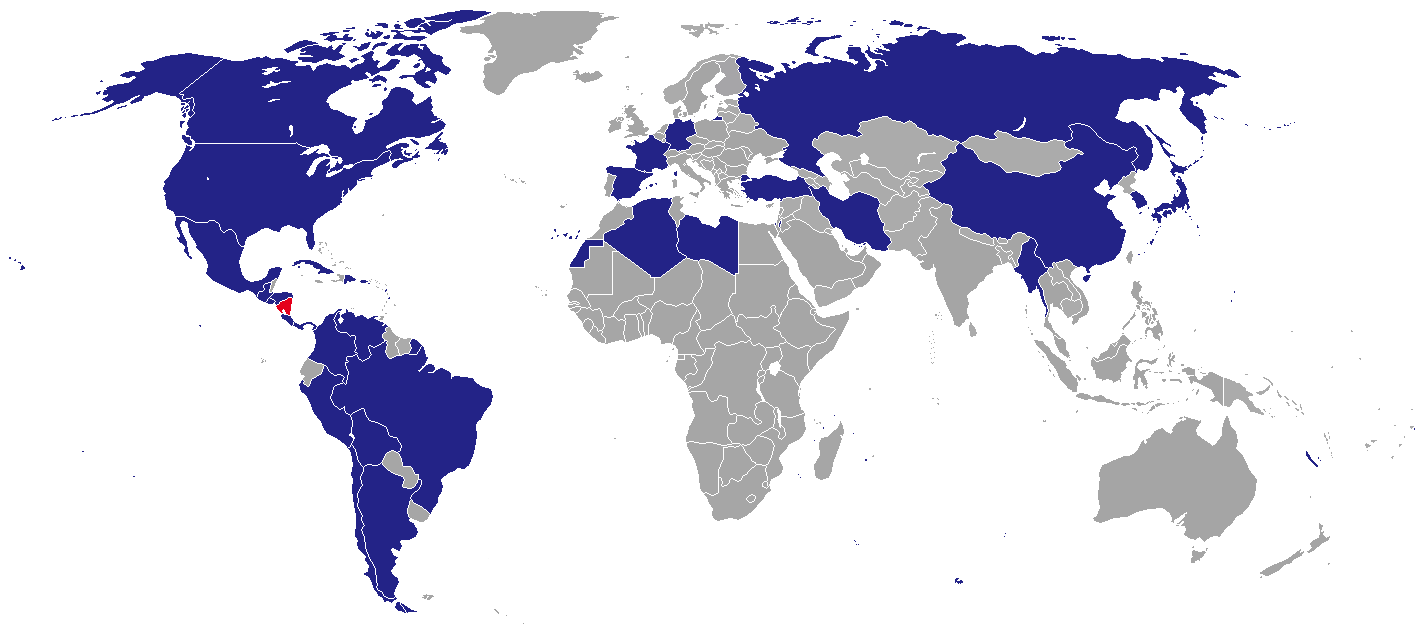
Map of diplomatic missions in Nicaragua

== Embassies in Managua ==
1. Abkhazia
2. Algeria
3. Argentina
4. Bolivia
5. Brazil
6. Chile
7. China
8. Colombia
9. Costa Rica
10. Cuba
11. El Salvador
12. France
13. Germany
14. Guatemala
15. Honduras
16. Iran
17. Japan
18. Libya
19. Mexico
20. Myanmar
21. Palestine
22. Panama
23. Peru
24. Russia
25. Sahrawi Republic
26. South Korea
27. Spain
28. Turkey
29. United States
30. Venezuela

== Missions/Offices ==
- Canada (Embassy office)
- European Union (Delegation)
- Switzerland (Swiss Cooperation Office)

== Non-Resident Embassies ==
Resident in Mexico City unless otherwise noted

- Afghanistan (Washington, D.C.)
- Angola (Havana)
- Armenia
- Australia
- Austria
- Azerbaijan (New York City)
- Bangladesh (Ottawa)
- Bahrain (Washington, D.C.)
- Barbados (Washington, D.C.)
- Belgium (Panama City)
- Belize (Guatemala City)
- Bulgaria
- Burkina Faso (Havana)
- Cambodia (Havana)
- Canada (San José)
- Central African Republic (Washington, D.C.)
- Chad (Washington, D.C.)
- Congo-Brazzaville (Havana)
- Congo-Kinshasa (Havana)
- Croatia (New York City)
- Cyprus
- Czech Republic (San José)
- Djibouti (Havana)
- Dominica (Havana)
- Denmark
- Estonia (New York City)
- Egypt (Panama City)
- Ethiopia (Washington, D.C.)
- Eritrea (New York City)
- Finland
- Micronesia (New York City)
- Fiji (Washington, D.C.)
- Gabon (Washington, D.C.)
- Ghana (Havana)
- Greece
- Guinea (Havana)
- Guyana (Havana)
- Guinea-Bissau (New York City)
- Haiti (Panama City)
- Hungary
- Iceland (Ottawa)
- India (Panama City)
- Indonesia (Panama City)
- Iraq
- Ireland
- Ivory Coast
- Jordan
- Jamaica
- Kazakhstan
- Kiribati (New York City)
- Kuwait
- Kenya (Havana)
- Kyrgyzstan (New York City)
- Laos (Havana)
- Lebanon
- Liberia (New York City)
- Lesotho (Ottawa)
- Mali (Ottawa)
- Maldives (New York City)
- Marshall Islands (New York City)
- Malaysia (Havana)
- Mauritania (Brasília)
- Morocco (Panama City)
- Mozambique (Havana)
- Nauru (New York City)
- New Zealand
- Nigeria (Havana)
- Norway
- Oman (New York City)
- Pakistan
- Paraguay (Panama City)
- Philippines
- Portugal (Panama City)
- Poland (Panama City)
- Portugal
- Romania
- Saint Kitts and Nevis (Washington, D.C.)
- Saint Lucia (Washington, D.C.)
- Saint Vincent and the Grenadines (Washington, D.C.)
- Serbia
- Slovakia
- Saudi Arabia
- Singapore (Washington, D.C.)
- South Africa
- South Ossetia (Moscow)
- Suriname (Washington, D.C.)
- Sierra Leone (New York City)
- Sweden (Guatemala City)
- Switzerland (San José)
- Sudan (New York City)
- Senegal (New York City)
- Syria (Caracas)
- South Sudan (New York City)
- Somalia (New York City)
- Thailand
- Timor-Leste (Havana)
- Togo (Washington, D.C.)
- Turkmenistan (Washington, D.C.)
- Tunisia (Washington, D.C.)
- Tajikistan (Washington, D.C.)
- Tuvalu (New York City)
- Timor-Leste (New York City)
- Tanzania (New York City)
- Tonga (New York City)
- Uganda (New York City)
- United Arab Emirates (Bogotá)
- United Kingdom (San José)
- Uzbekistan
- Vanuatu (New York City)
- Vietnam (Havana)
- Yemen (Havana)
- Zimbabwe (Havana)
- Zambia (Washington, D.C.)

== Closed missions ==
Host city	Sending country	Mission	Year closed	Ref.
Managua	Bulgaria	Embassy	1997	
Managua	Denmark	Embassy	2012	
Managua	Dominican Republic	Embassy	2026	
Managua	East Germany	Embassy	1990	
Managua	Ecuador	Embassy	2020	
Managua	Finland	Embassy	2013	
Managua	Holy See	Embassy	2023	
Managua	Iceland	Embassy	2009	
Managua	Italy	Embassy	2026	
Managua	Luxembourg	Embassy	2022	
Managua	Netherlands	Embassy	2013	
Managua	North Korea	Embassy	1995	
Managua	Norway	Embassy	2011	
Managua	Sweden	Embassy	2008	
Managua	Taiwan	Embassy	2021	
Managua	United Kingdom	Embassy	2003	
Managua	Uruguay	Embassy	2021	
Managua	Vietnam	Embassy	1991	
Bluefields	Colombia	Consulate	1999	
Chinandega	Costa Rica	Consulate	2022	
Chinandega	El Salvador	Consulate-General	2013	
Rivas	Costa Rica	Consulate	2006	

== See also ==
- Foreign relations of Nicaragua
- List of diplomatic missions of Nicaragua
