= List of diplomatic missions of Nicaragua =

This is a list of diplomatic missions of Nicaragua, excluding honorary consulates.

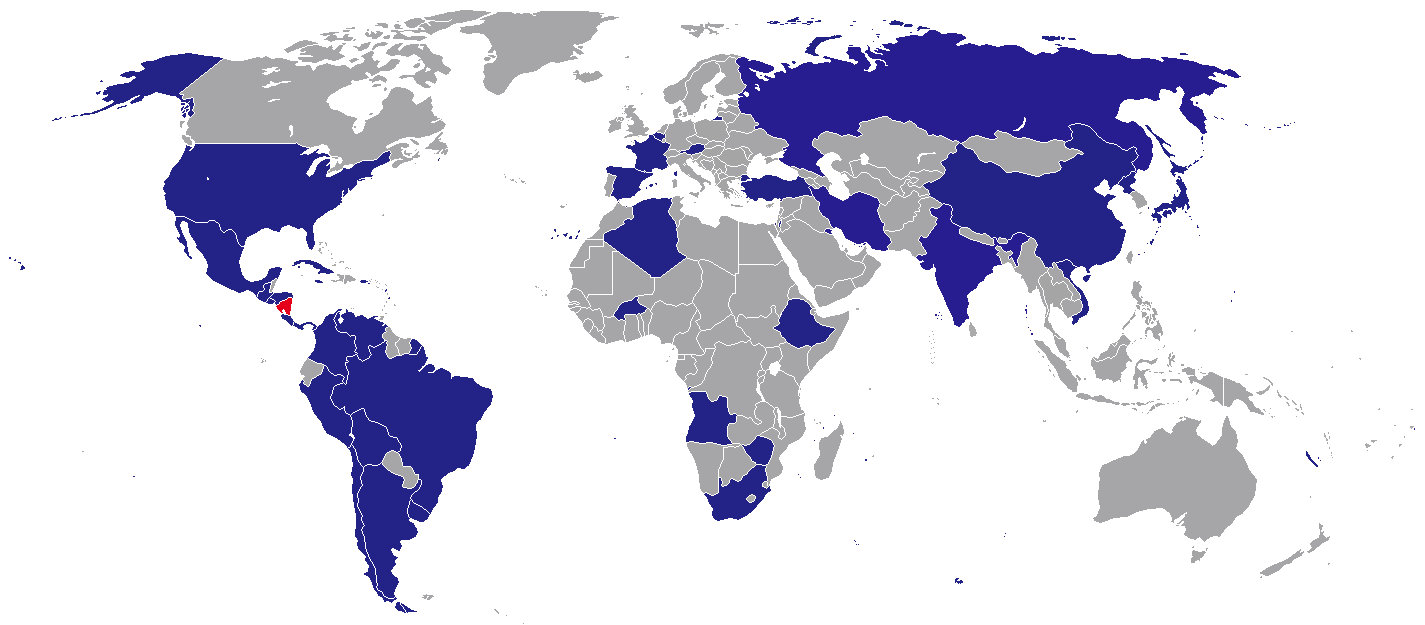
Map of Nicaraguan diplomatic missions

== Current missions ==
=== Africa ===
| Host country | Host city | Mission | Concurrent accreditation | Ref. |
|---|---|---|---|---|
| Algeria | Algiers | Embassy | Countries: Sahrawi Republic | |
| Angola | Luanda | Embassy | Countries: Equatorial Guinea | |
| Burkina Faso | Ouagadougou | Embassy | Countries: Benin; Ghana; Niger; Nigeria; Togo | |
| Ethiopia | Addis Ababa | Embassy | Countries: Kenya; Uganda | |
| South Africa | Pretoria | Embassy | | |
| Zimbabwe | Harare | Embassy | Countries: Burundi; Malawi; Rwanda; Zambia | |

=== Americas ===
| Host country | Host city | Mission | Concurrent accreditation | Ref. |
|---|---|---|---|---|
| Argentina | Buenos Aires | Embassy | | |
| Bolivia | La Paz | Embassy | | |
| Chile | Santiago de Chile | Embassy | Countries: Paraguay | |
| Colombia | Bogotá | Embassy | | |
| Costa Rica | San José | Embassy | | |
| Cuba | Havana | Embassy | | |
| El Salvador | San Salvador | Embassy | Countries: Belize; Guatemala | |
| Honduras | Tegucigalpa | Embassy | | |
| Jamaica | Kingston | Embassy | | |
| Mexico | Mexico City | Embassy | | |
| Panama | Panama City | Embassy | | |
| Peru | Lima | Embassy | | |
| United States | Washington, D.C. | Embassy | Countries: Canada | |
| United States | Miami | Consulate-General | Countries: Canada | |
| United States | New York City | Consulate-General | Countries: Canada | |
| Uruguay | Montevideo | Embassy | | |
| Venezuela | Caracas | Embassy | Countries: Trinidad and Tobago | |

=== Asia ===
| Host country | Host city | Mission | Concurrent accreditation | Ref. |
|---|---|---|---|---|
| China | Beijing | Embassy | Countries: Afghanistan | |
| India | New Delhi | Embassy | | |
| Iran | Tehran | Embassy | Countries: Syria | |
| Japan | Tokyo | Embassy | Countries: Thailand | |
| Kuwait | Kuwait City | Embassy | Countries: Bahrain; Brunei; Qatar; Saudi Arabia; Tunisia; United Arab Emirates | |
| North Korea | Pyongyang | Embassy | | |
| Palestine | Ramallah | Embassy | | |
| Turkey | Ankara | Embassy | Countries: Egypt; Jordan; Lebanon; Turkmenistan; Uzbekistan | |
| Vietnam | Hanoi | Embassy | Countries: Cambodia; Indonesia; Laos; Malaysia; Myanmar; Philippines; Singapore; Timor-Leste | |

=== Europe ===
| Host country | Host city | Mission | Concurrent accreditation | Ref. |
|---|---|---|---|---|
| Austria | Vienna | Embassy | Countries: Cyprus; Germany; Liechtenstein; San Marino; Serbia | |
| Belgium | Brussels | Embassy | Countries: Luxembourg; Poland; International Organizations:: European Union | |
| France | Paris | Embassy | Countries: Portugal | |
| Russia | Moscow | Embassy | Countries: Abkhazia; Armenia; Azerbaijan; Belarus; Kazakhstan; Kyrgyzstan; Mongolia; South Ossetia | |
| Spain | Madrid | Embassy | Countries: Andorra; Czechia; Greece; Slovakia; International Organizations:: International Maritime Organization; World Tourism Organization | |

=== Multilateral organizations ===
| Organization | Host city | Host country | Mission | Concurrent accreditation |
|---|---|---|---|---|
| Organisation for the Prohibition of Chemical Weapons | The Hague | Netherlands | Permanent Representation | |
| United Nations | Geneva | Switzerland | Permanent Mission | Countries: Switzerland |
| United Nations | New York City | United States | Permanent Mission | Countries: South Korea |

== Gallery ==
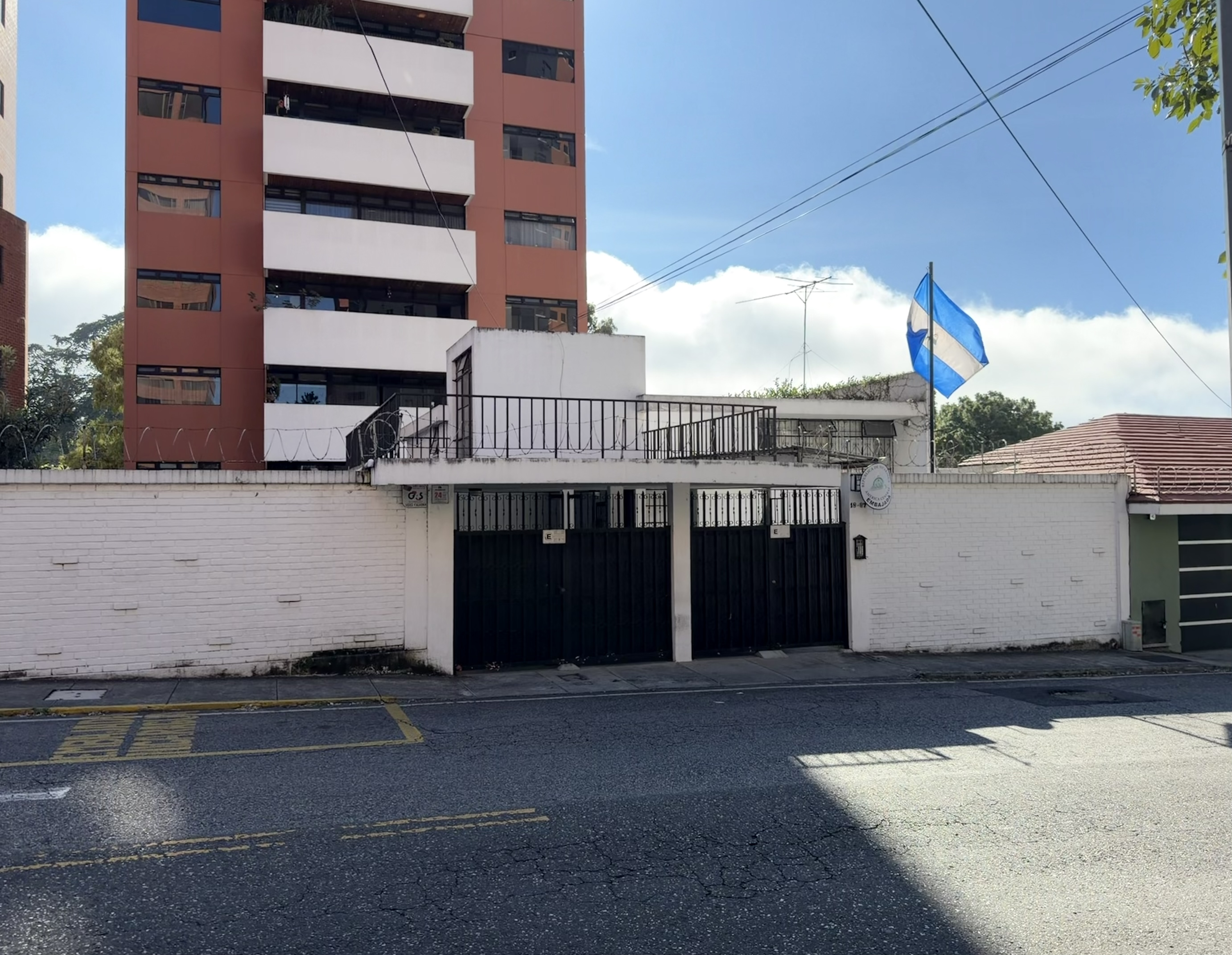
Embassy in Guatemala City

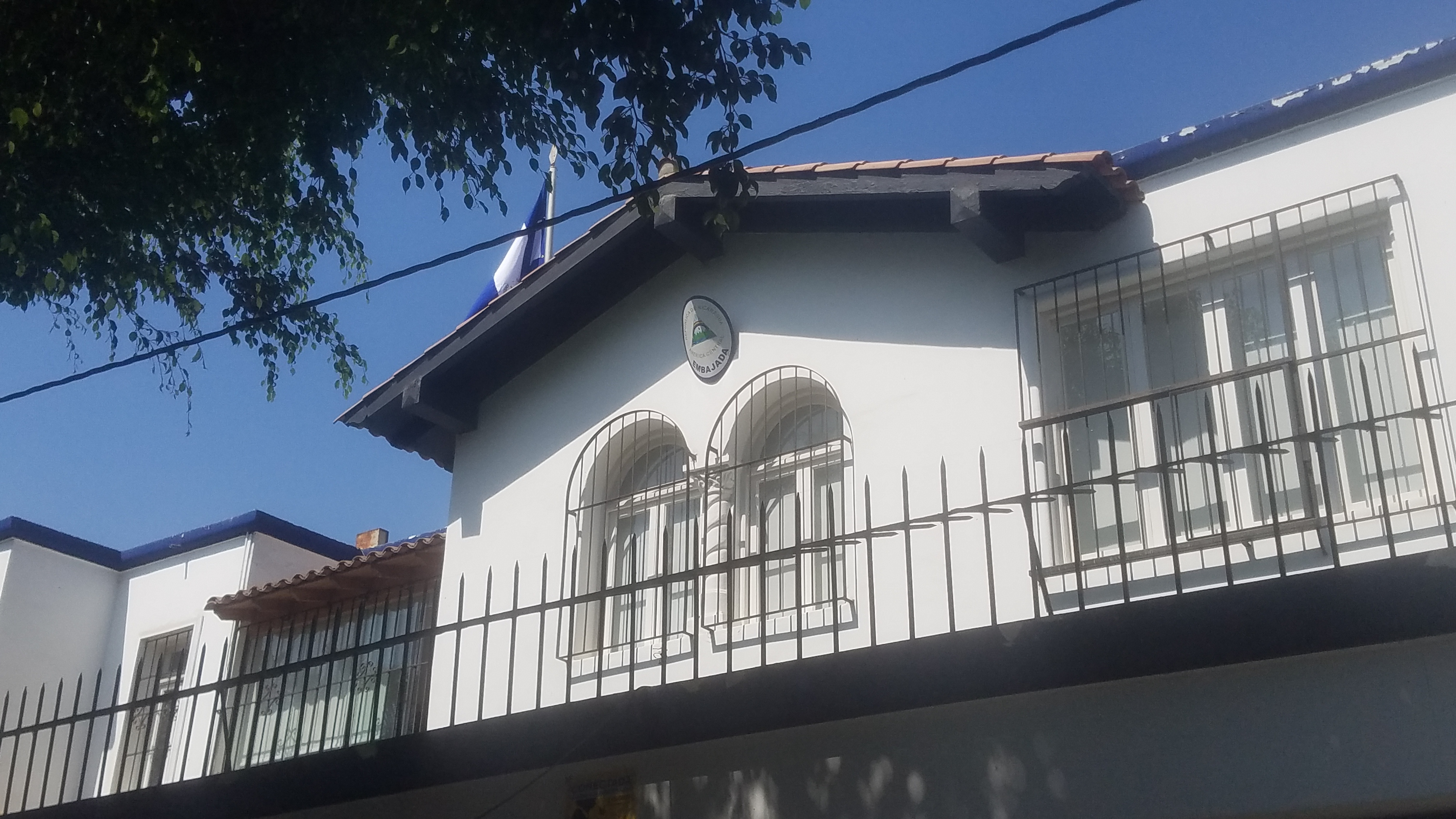
Embassy in Lima

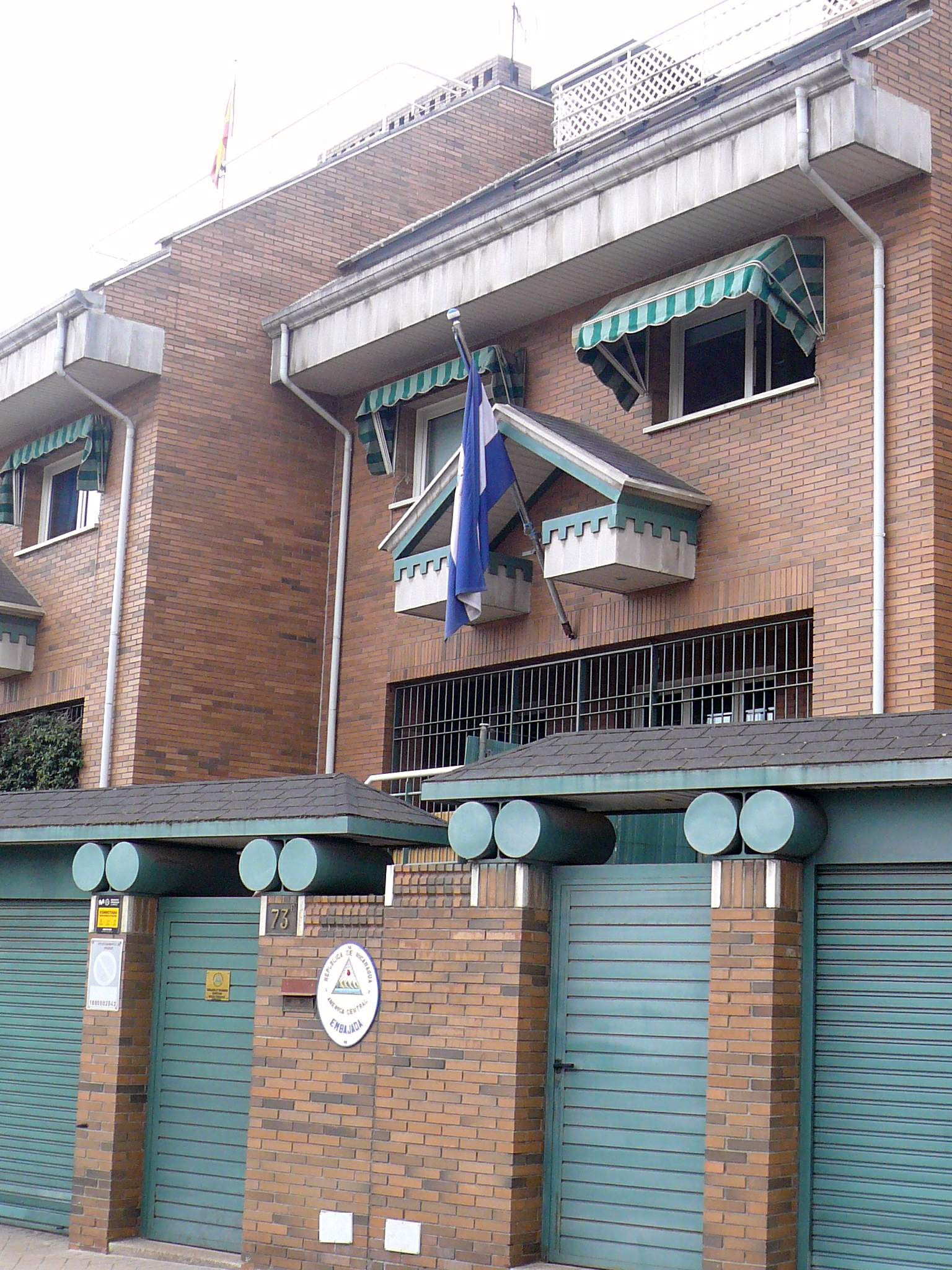
Embassy in Madrid

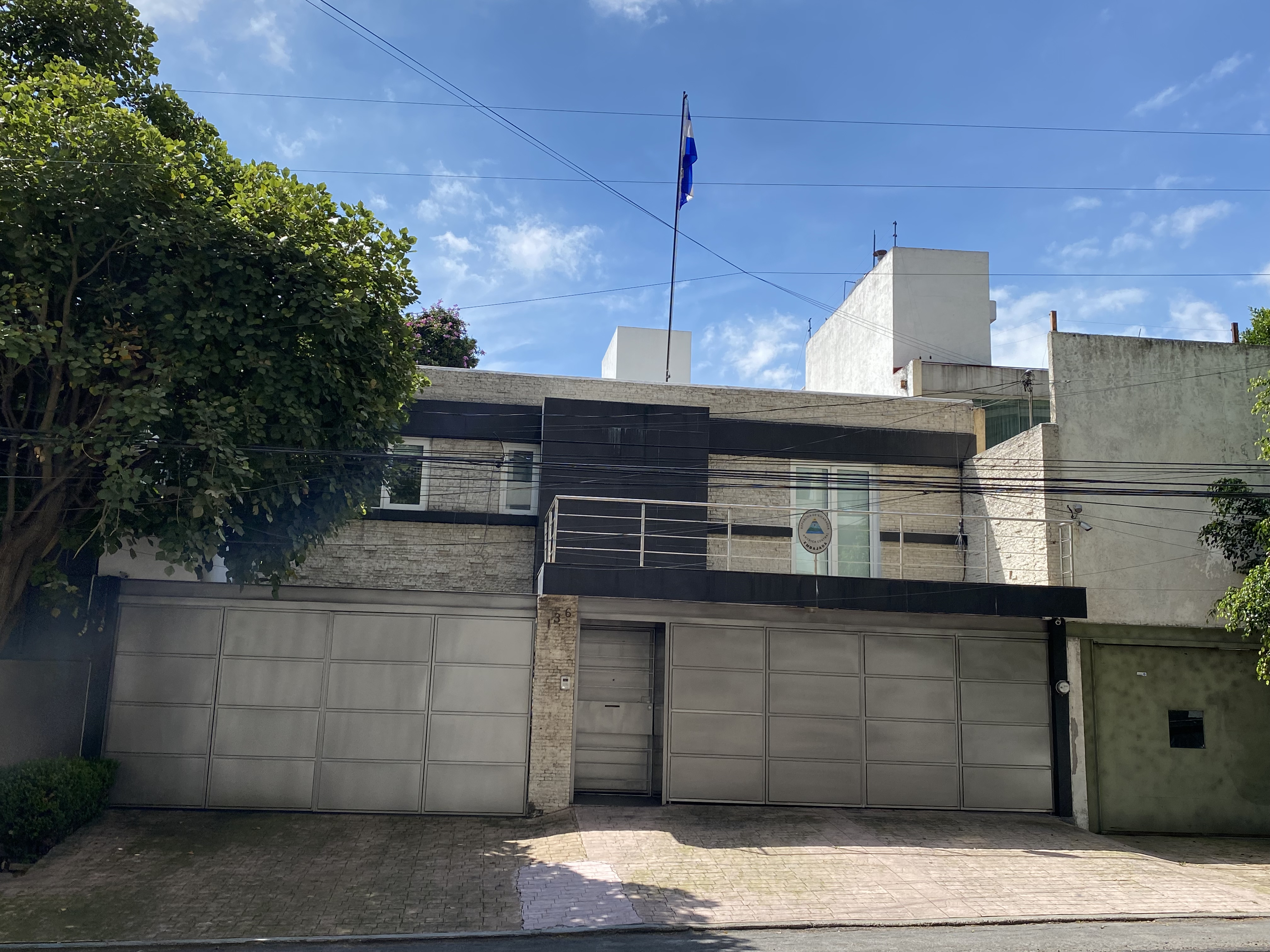
Embassy in Mexico City

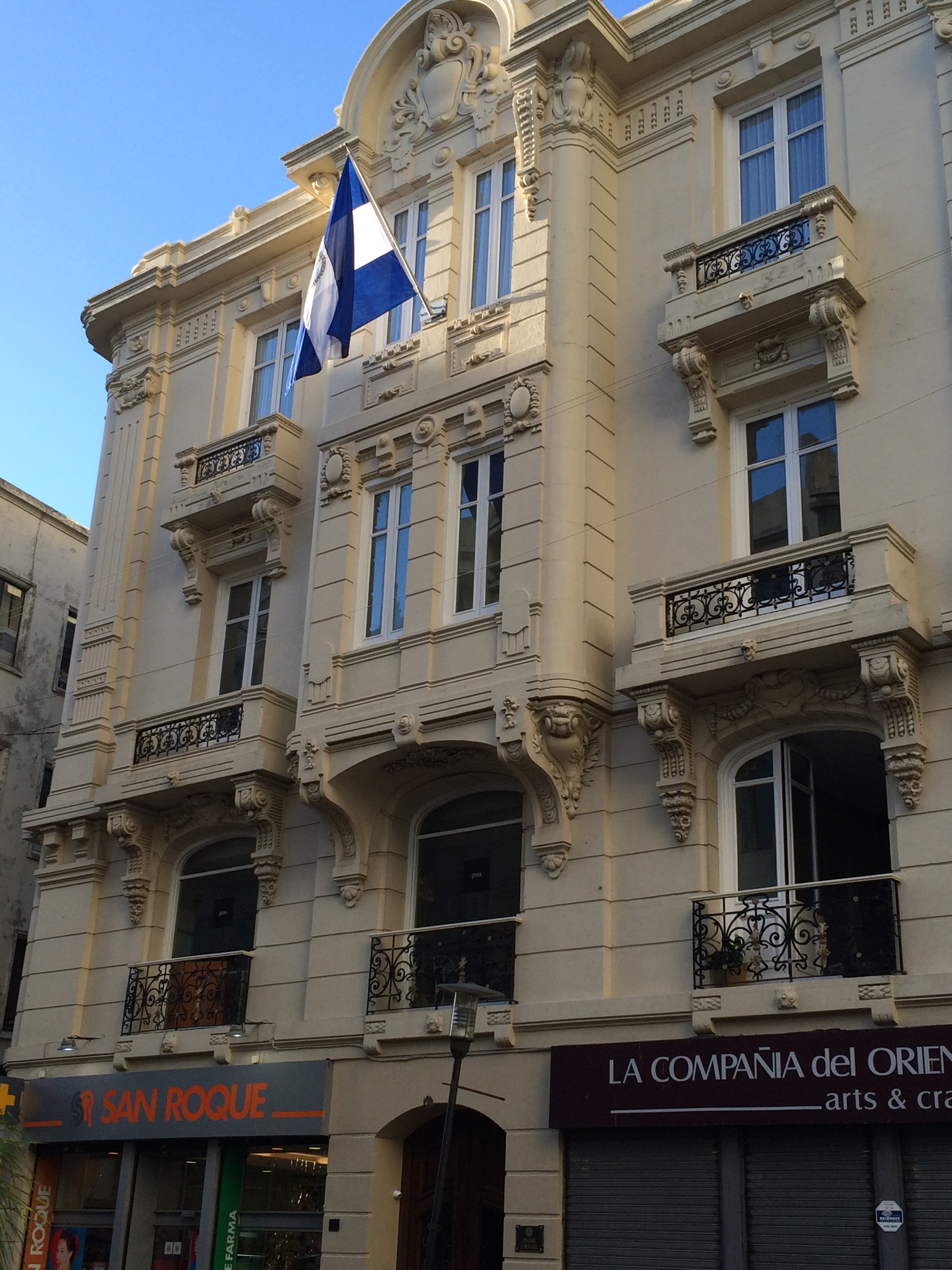
Embassy in Montevideo

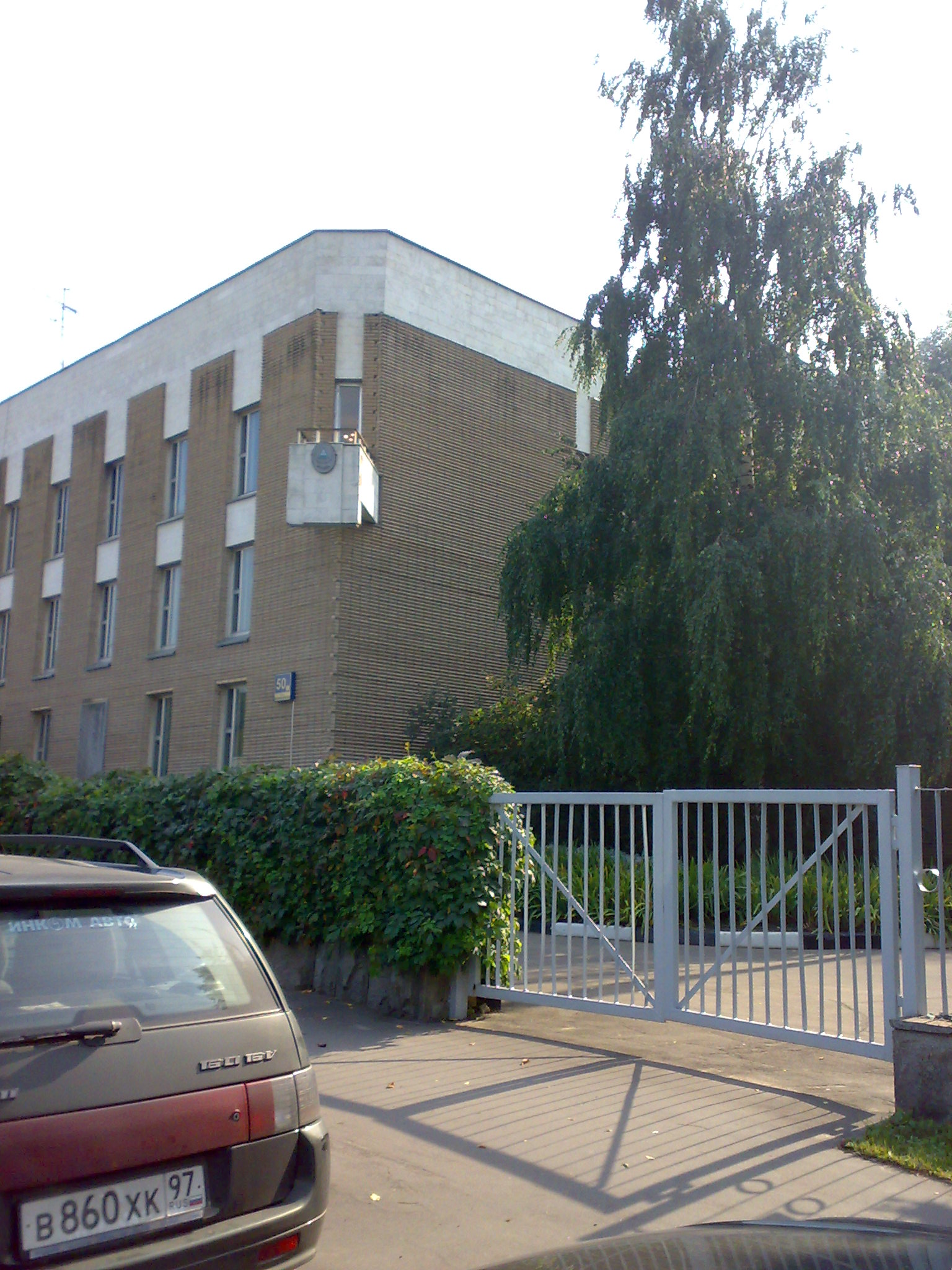
Embassy in Moscow

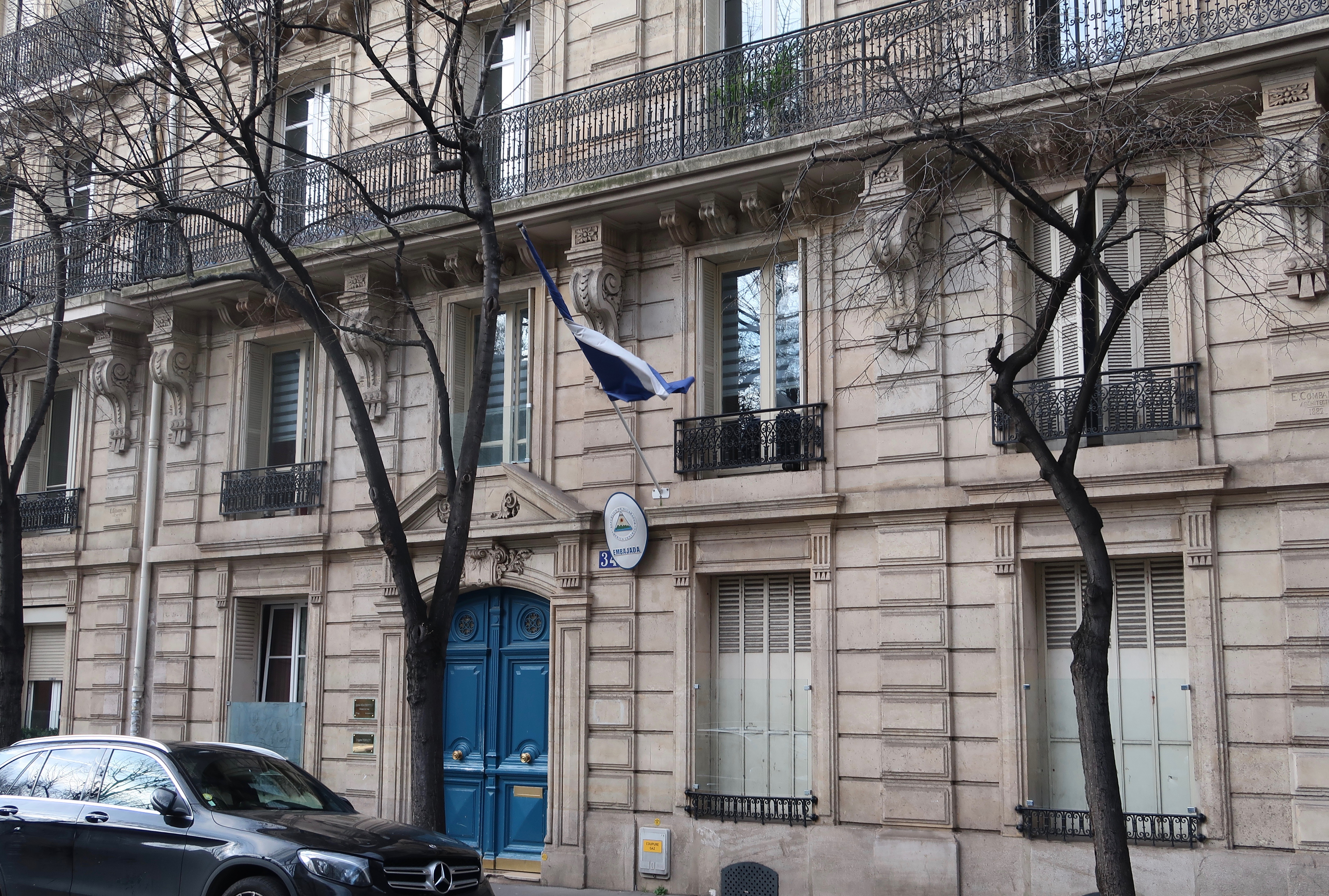
Embassy in Paris

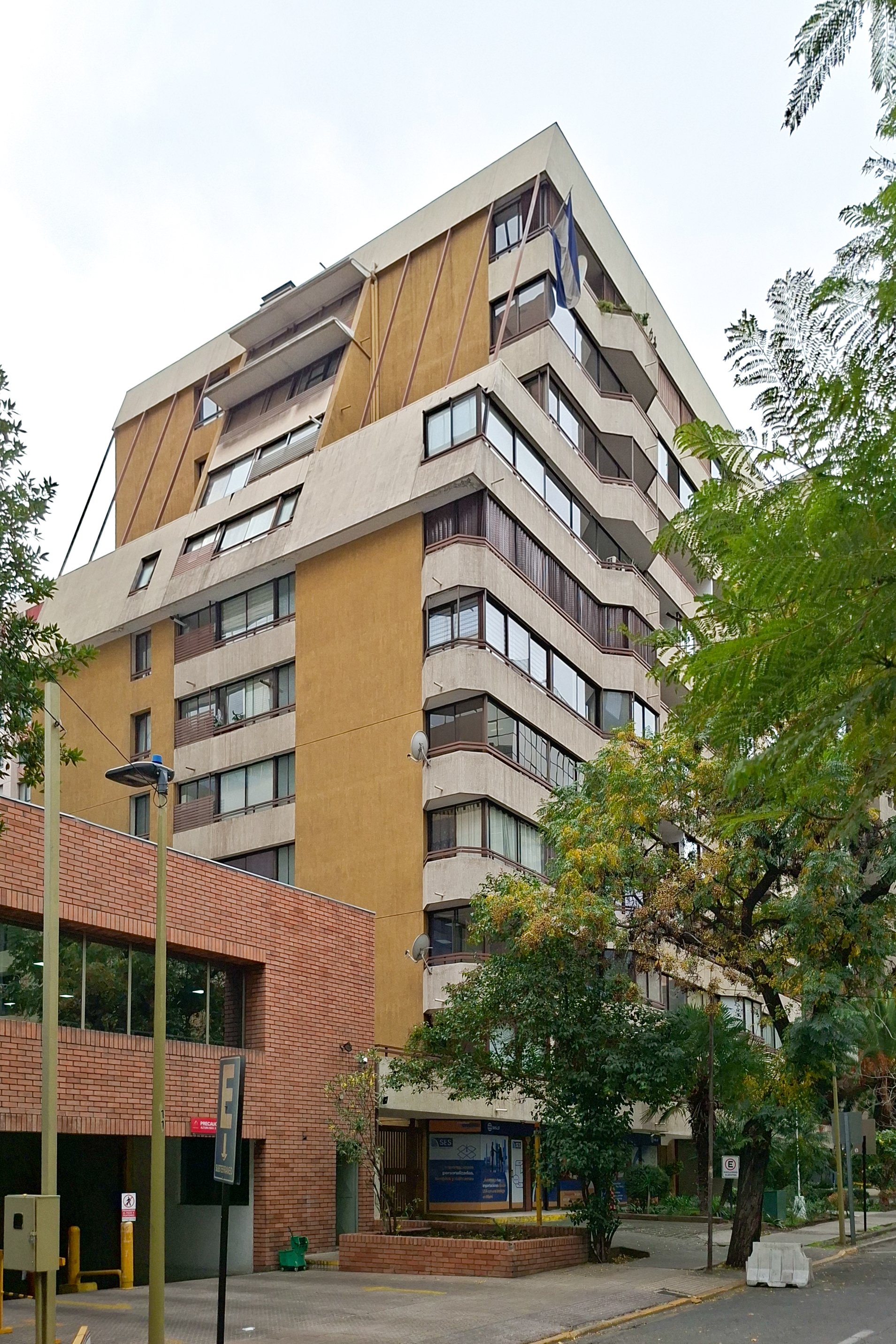
Embassy in Santiago

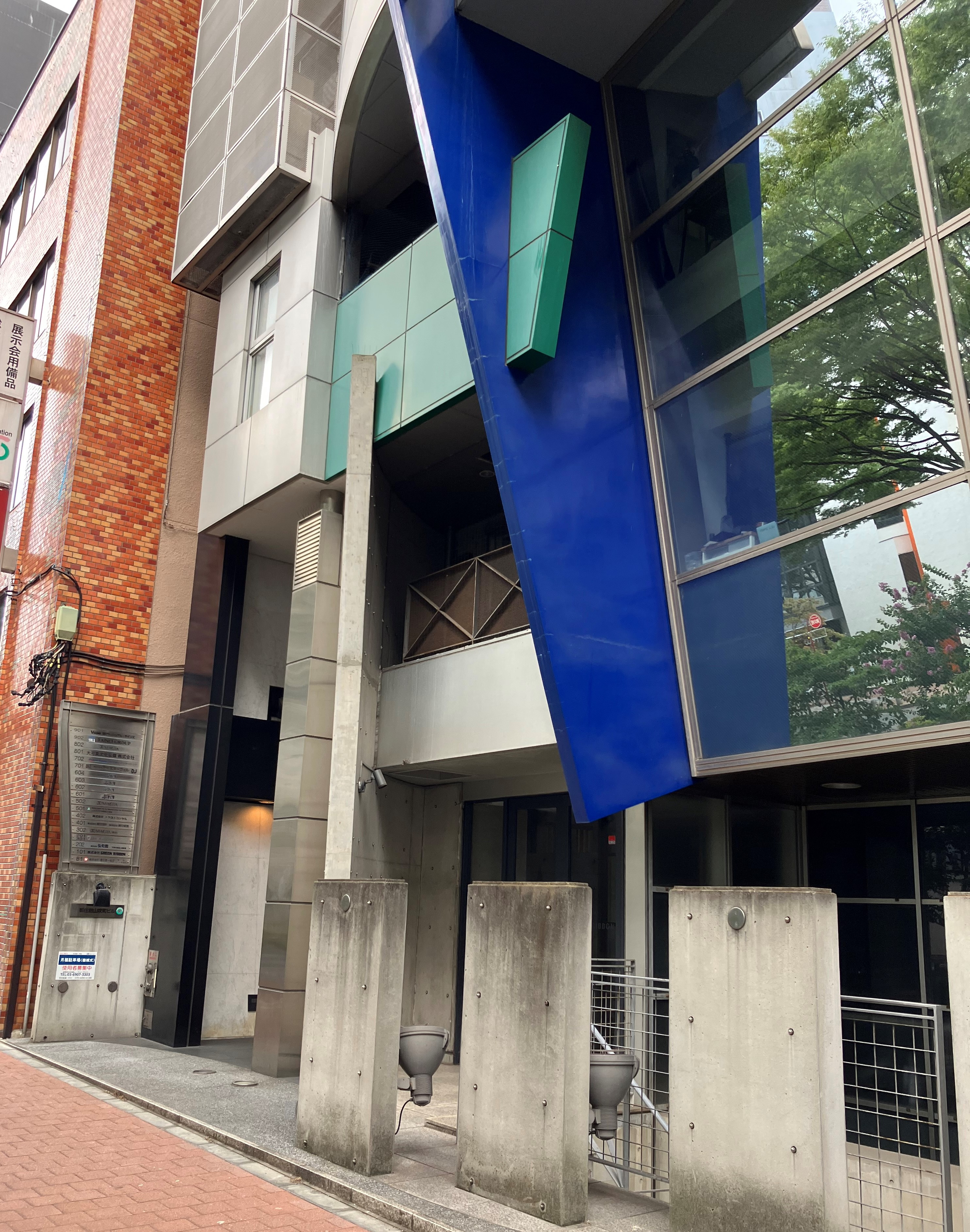
Building hosting the embassy in Tokyo

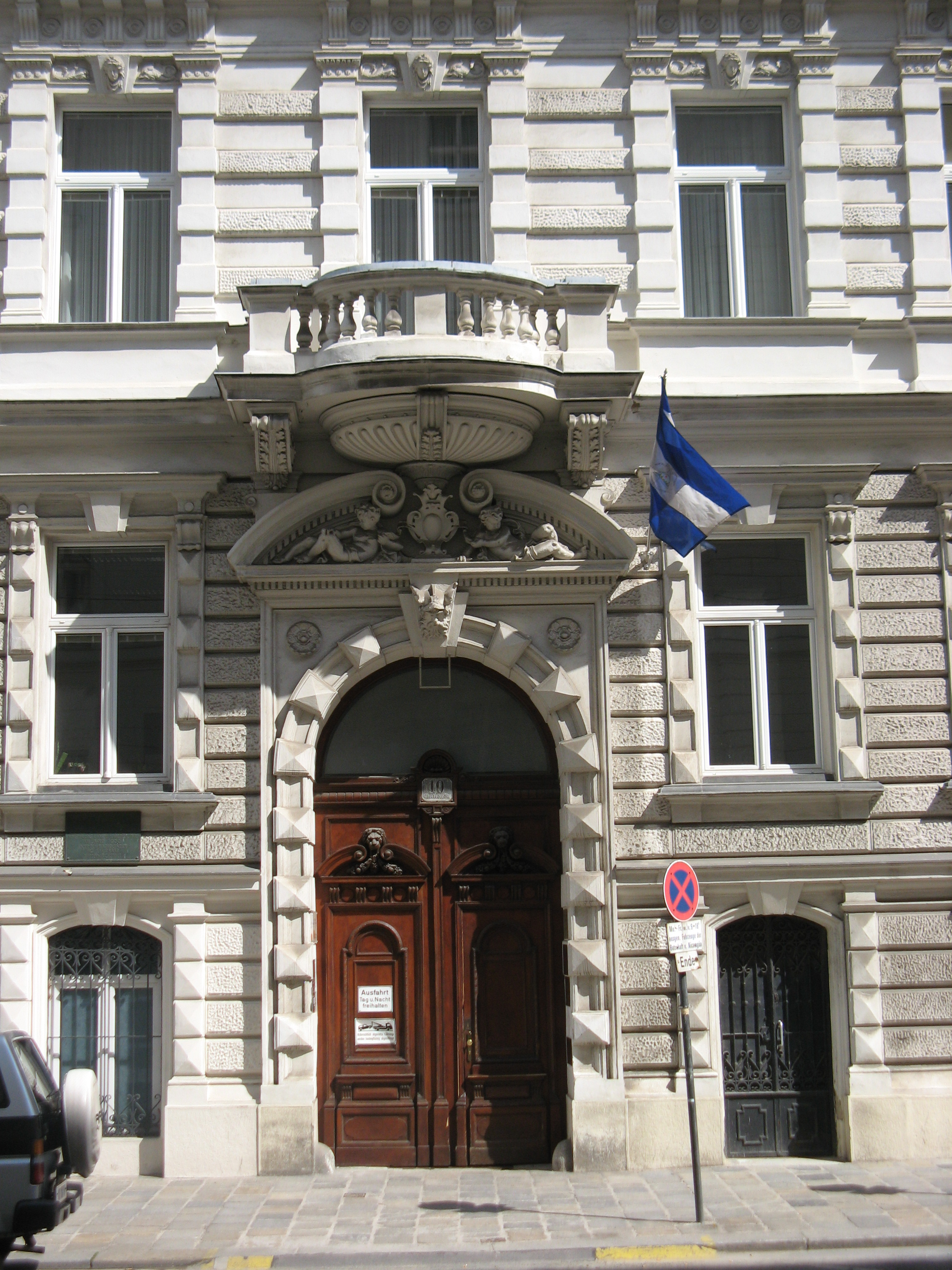
Embassy in Vienna

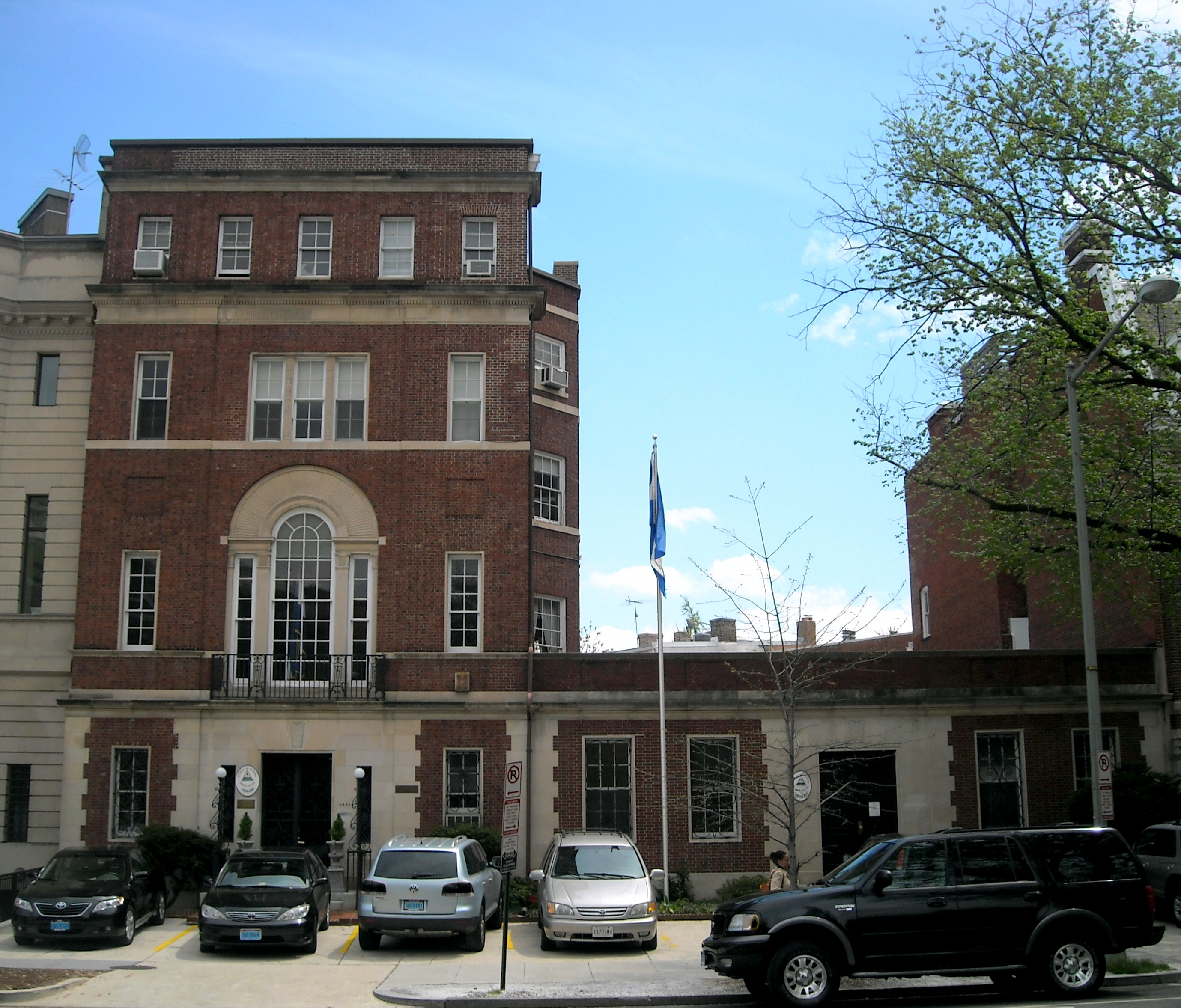
Embassy in Washington, D.C.

== Closed missions ==
=== Africa ===
| Host country | Host city | Mission | Year closed | Ref. |
|---|---|---|---|---|
| Libya | Tripoli | Embassy (Note: Resident in Algiers, Algeria) | 2011 | |
| Mozambique | Maputo | Embassy | Unknown | |
| Senegal | Dakar | Embassy | 2021 | |

=== Americas ===
| Host country | Host city | Mission | Year closed | Ref. |
|---|---|---|---|---|
| Belize | Belmopan | Embassy | 2021 | |
| Brazil | Brasília | Embassy | 2025 | |
| Costa Rica | Limón | Consulate | 2007 | |
| Costa Rica | Los Chiles | Consulate | 2017 | |
| Costa Rica | Puerto Viejo | Consulate | 2007 | |
| Costa Rica | Quesada | Consulate | 2017 | |
| Dominican Republic | Santo Domingo | Embassy | 2026 | |
| Ecuador | Quito | Embassy | 2020 | |
| Guatemala | Guatemala City | Embassy | 2024 | |
| Mexico | Tapachula | Consulate | 2024 | |
| United States | Houston | Consulate-General | 2024 | |
| United States | Los Angeles | Consulate-General | 2024 | |
| United States | New Orleans | Consulate-General | 2024 | |
| United States | San Francisco | Consulate-general | 2024 | |

=== Asia ===
| Host country | Host city | Mission | Year closed | Ref. |
|---|---|---|---|---|
| South Korea | Seoul | Embassy (Note: United Nations resident in New York City, United States) | 2024 | |
| Republic of China (Taiwan) | Taipei | Embassy | 2021 | |

=== Europe ===
| Host country | Host city | Mission | Year closed | Ref. |
|---|---|---|---|---|
| Bulgaria | Sofia | Embassy | 1994 | |
| Germany | Berlin | Embassy | 2024 | |
| Holy See | Rome | Embassy | 2023 | |
| Italy | Rome | Embassy | 2026 | |
| Netherlands | The Hague | Embassy | 2022 | |

== See also ==
- Foreign relations of Nicaragua
- Ambassadors of Nicaragua
- List of diplomatic missions in Nicaragua
- Visa policy of Nicaragua
