= Carlos Argüello Gómez =

Nicaraguan lawyer and diplomat

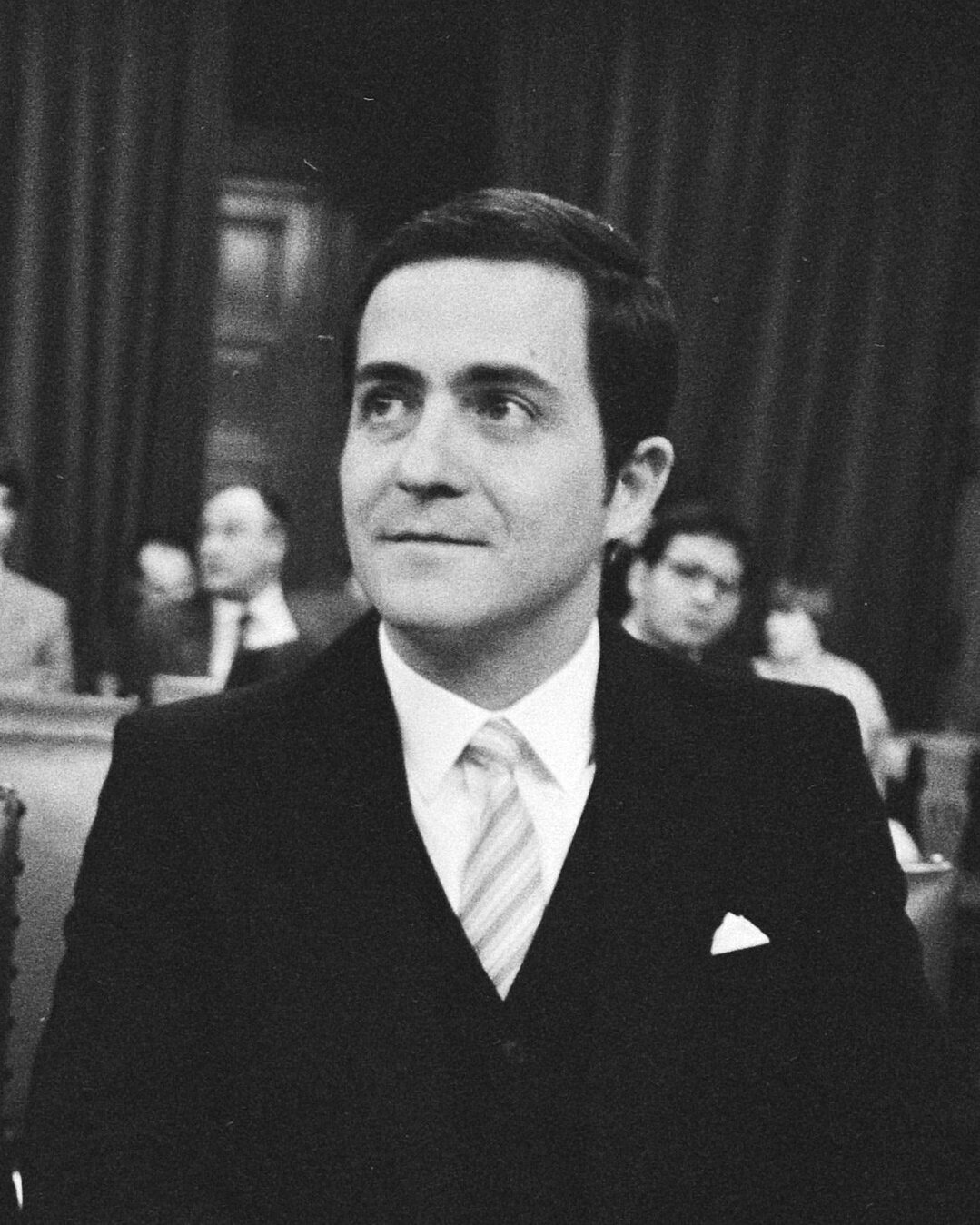
- Argüello at the ICJ in 1984

Nicaraguan Ambassador to the Netherlands.
- In office January 1, 1983 – Incumbent
- President: Junta of National Reconstruction

Nicaraguan Ambassador to the International Court of Justice.
- In office January 1, 1983 – Incumbent
- President: Junta of National Reconstruction
- Preceded by: None

Nicaraguan Ambassador to the United Kingdom
- In office August 21, 2010 – October 26, 2014
- President: Daniel Ortega
- Preceded by: Guisell Morales Echaverry

Personal details
- Born: 1946 (age 79–80) Managua
- Party: FSLN
- Spouse: Sherly Aurora Noguera Miranda

Dr. Carlos José Argüello Gómez is a Nicaraguan lawyer and diplomat. He has been the Nicaraguan Ambassador to the Netherlands since 1983.

== Early life and education ==
Carlos José Argüello Gómez was born in San José, Costa Rica, on 27 July 1946, the son of Nicaraguan nationals Fernando Argüello Solórzano and Alina Gómez Argüello. He studied Legal Sciences at Universidad Centroamericana (UCA) and received his A.B. in 1976. From 1980 until 1982, he served as Deputy Minister of Justice, and from 1982 until 1983, he served as Nicaragua's Minister of Justice.

== Nicaragua v. Germany (facilitation of genocide) ==
On April 8, 2024, Carlos José Argüello Gómez was opening the case on behalf of Nicaragua at the International Court of Justice, accusing Germany of complicity to the genocidal acts by Israel against the Palestinian population in Gaza. He argued that Germany has continued and increased their military exports to Israel despite the documented crimes against humanity by Israel. He also mentioned Germany's objection to the Genocide Convention against Israel filed by South Africa in December 2023.
