= Fidel Castro =

Leader of Cuba from 1959 to 2011

- Castro in 1959

First Secretary of the Communist Party of Cuba
- In office 3 October 1965 – 19 April 2011
- Deputy: Raúl Castro
- Preceded by: Blas Roca Calderio
- Succeeded by: Raúl Castro

President of the Council of State of Cuba
- In office 2 December 1976 – 24 February 2008 (Note: For medical reasons, presidential powers were transferred to the Vice President from 31 July 2006.)
- Vice President: Raúl Castro
- Preceded by: Osvaldo Dorticós Torrado
- Succeeded by: Raúl Castro

President of the Council of Ministers of Cuba
- In office 2 December 1976 – 24 February 2008^{[a]}
- Vice President: Raúl Castro
- Preceded by: Himself (as prime minister)
- Succeeded by: Raúl Castro

Prime Minister of Cuba
- In office 16 February 1959 – 2 December 1976
- President: Manuel Urrutia Lleó; Osvaldo Dorticós Torrado
- Preceded by: José Miró Cardona
- Succeeded by: Himself (as president of the Council of Ministers)

Secretary-General of the Non-Aligned Movement
- In office 16 September 2006 – 24 February 2008
- Preceded by: Abdullah Ahmad Badawi
- Succeeded by: Raúl Castro
- In office 10 September 1979 – 6 March 1983
- Preceded by: J. R. Jayewardene
- Succeeded by: Neelam Sanjiva Reddy

Personal details
- Born: Fidel Alejandro Castro Ruz; 13 August 1926 Birán, Oriente, Cuba
- Died: 25 November 2016 (aged 90) Havana, La Habana, Cuba
- Resting place: Santa Ifigenia Cemetery, Santiago de Cuba
- Party: PCC (from 1965)
- Other political affiliations: PPC-O (1947–1952); M-26-7 (1952–1962); PURSC (1962–1965)
- Spouses: Mirta Díaz-Balart (m. 1948; div. 1955) Dalia Soto del Valle (m. 1980)
- Domestic partner: Natalia Revuelta Clews (1955–1959)
- Children: 9, including Fidelito and Alina
- Parent: Ángel Castro y Argiz (father)
- Relatives: 5 brothers, including Raúl and Ramón; 7 sisters, including Juanita, Mariela Castro (niece), and; Alejandro Castro Espín (nephew)
- Education: University of Havana
- Occupation: Revolutionary; politician
- Awards: Full list
- Nicknames: Bola de Churre; El Caballo; El Comandante; El guajiro; El loco; Fifo; Pistolita; Barbatruco; El Coma Andante

Military service
- Allegiance: Republic of Cuba
- Branch/service: Revolutionary Armed Forces
- Years of service: 1953–2016
- Rank: Comandante
- Unit: 26th of July Movement
- Battles/wars: Cuban Revolution; Attack on the Moncada Barracks; Landing of the Granma; Battle of Alegría de Pío; Battle of La Plata (1957); Attack on El Uvero; Operation Verano; Battle of La Plata; Battle of Las Mercedes; Escambray rebellion; Bay of Pigs Invasion; Cuban Missile Crisis; Machurucuto incident; Angolan Civil War; Ogaden War; US invasion of Grenada

Fidel Alejandro Castro Ruz (Note: English: /ˈkæstroʊ/ KASS-troh. Latin American Spanish: [fiˈðel ˈkastɾo].) (13 August 1926 – 25 November 2016) was a Cuban revolutionary and politician who was the leader of Cuba from 1959 to 2011. He served as prime minister from 1959 to 1976, president from 1976 to 2008, and first secretary of the Communist Party of Cuba from 1965 until 2011. Ideologically a Marxist–Leninist and Cuban nationalist, under his administration Cuba became a one-party communist state; industry and business were nationalized, and socialist reforms were implemented throughout society.

Born in Birán, the son of a wealthy Spanish farmer, Castro adopted leftist and anti-imperialist ideas while studying law at the University of Havana. After participating in rebellions against right-wing governments in the Dominican Republic and Colombia, he planned the overthrow of Cuban president Fulgencio Batista, launching a failed attack on the Moncada Barracks in 1953. After a year's imprisonment, Castro travelled to Mexico where he formed a revolutionary group, the 26th of July Movement, with his brother, Raúl Castro, and Ernesto "Che" Guevara. Returning to Cuba, Castro took a key role in the Cuban Revolution by leading the movement in a guerrilla war against Batista's forces from the Sierra Maestra. After Batista's overthrow in 1959, Castro assumed military and political power as Cuba's prime minister. The United States came to oppose Castro's government and unsuccessfully attempted to remove him by assassination, economic embargo, and counter-revolution, including the Bay of Pigs Invasion of 1961. Countering these threats, Castro aligned with the Soviet Union and allowed the Soviets to place nuclear weapons in Cuba, resulting in the Cuban Missile Crisis—a defining incident of the Cold War—in 1962.

Adopting a Marxist–Leninist model of development, Castro converted Cuba into a one-party, socialist state under Communist Party rule, the first in the Western Hemisphere. Policies introducing central economic planning and expanding healthcare and education were accompanied by state control of the press and the suppression of internal dissent. Abroad, Castro supported anti-imperialist revolutionary groups, backing the establishment of Marxist governments in Chile, Nicaragua, and Grenada, as well as sending troops to aid allies in the Yom Kippur, Ogaden, and Angolan Civil wars. These actions, coupled with Castro's leadership of the Non-Aligned Movement from 1979 to 1983 and Cuban medical internationalism, increased Cuba's profile on the world stage. Following the dissolution of the Soviet Union in 1991, Castro led Cuba through the economic downturn of the "Special Period", embracing environmentalist and anti-globalization ideas. In the 2000s, Castro forged alliances in the Latin American "Pink Tide"—namely with Hugo Chávez's Venezuela—and formed the Bolivarian Alliance for the Americas. In 2006, Castro transferred his responsibilities to Vice President Raúl Castro, who was elected to the presidency by the National Assembly in 2008. Castro died at the age of 90 from natural causes in November 2016.

Castro was the longest-serving non-royal head of state in the 20th and 21st centuries and polarized world opinion about his rule. His supporters view him as a champion of socialism and anti-imperialism whose revolutionary government advanced economic and social justice while securing Cuba's independence from American hegemony. His critics view him as a dictator whose administration oversaw human rights abuses, the exodus of many Cubans, and the impoverishment of the country's economy.

== Early life and career ==
=== Youth: 1926–1947 ===
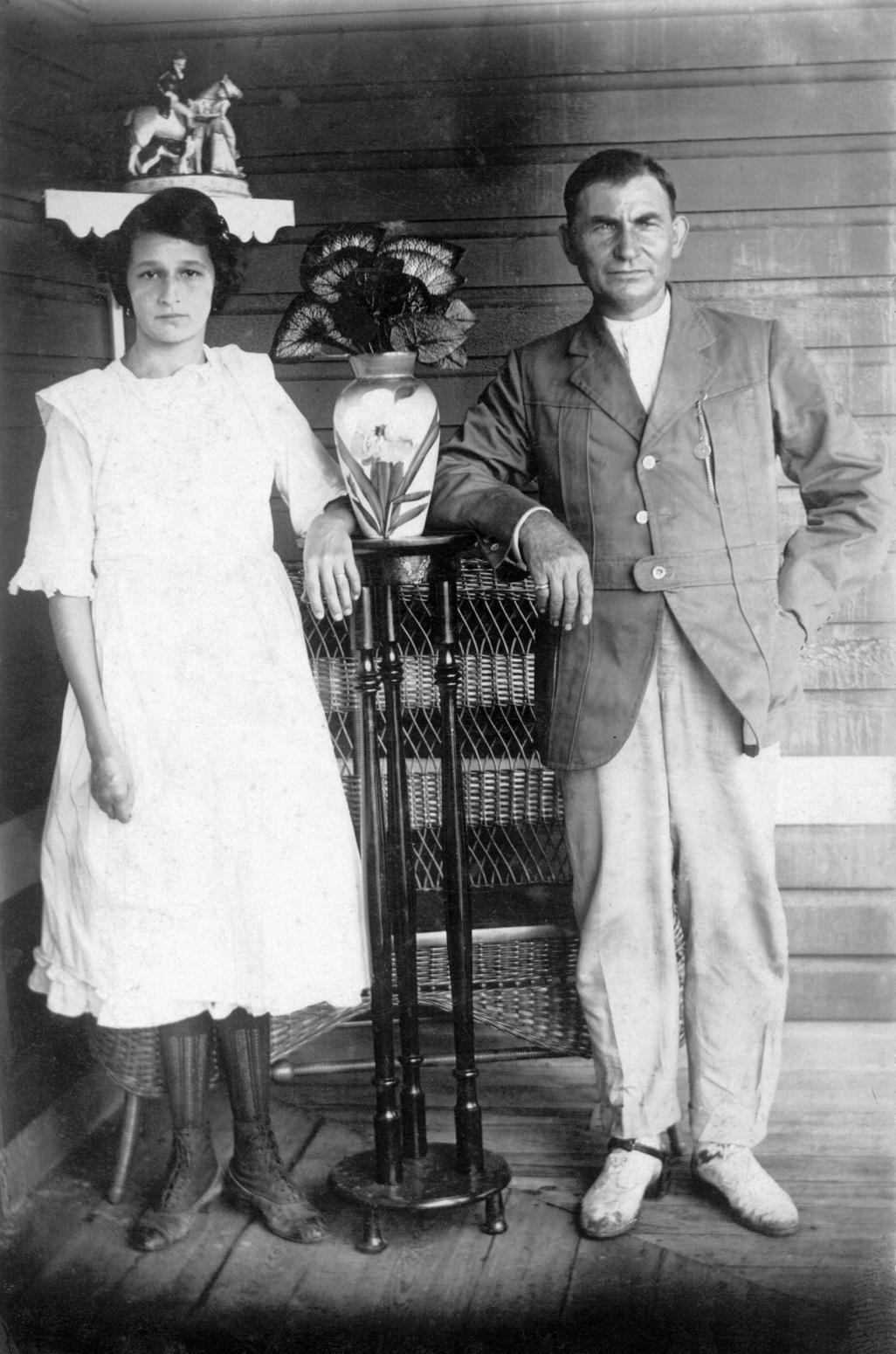
Fidel's parents, Ángel Castro y Argiz and Lina Ruz González

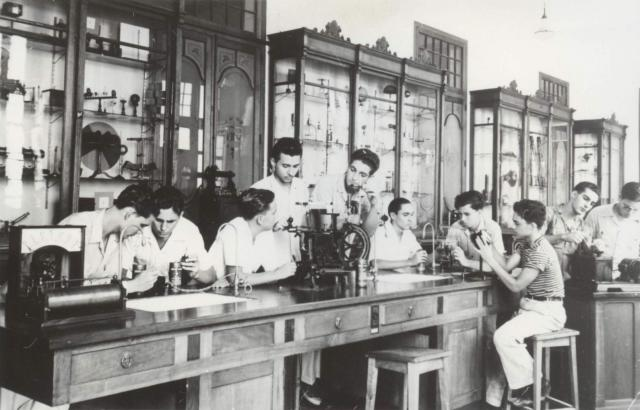
Castro, second from left, at Colegio de Belén, Havana, 1943

Fidel Alejandro Castro Ruz was born out of wedlock at his father's farm on 13 August 1926. His father, Ángel Castro y Argiz, was a migrant to Cuba from Galicia, northwest Spain. After the collapse of his first marriage he took his household servant, Lina Ruz González—of Canarian ancestry—as his mistress and later second wife; together they had seven children, among them Fidel. At age six, Castro was sent to live with his teacher in Santiago de Cuba, before being baptized into the Catholic Church at the age of eight. His baptism allowed Castro to attend the La Salle boarding school in Santiago, and was later sent to the Jesuit-run Dolores School in Santiago.

In 1942, Castro transferred to the Jesuit-run El Colegio de Belén in Havana. In 1945, Castro began studying law at the University of Havana where he became embroiled in student activism and the violent gangsterismo culture within the university. After becoming passionate about anti-imperialism and opposing US intervention in the Caribbean, he unsuccessfully campaigned for the presidency of the Federation of University Students. Castro became critical of the corruption and violence of President Ramón Grau's government, delivering a public speech on the subject in November 1946 that received coverage on the front page of several newspapers.

In 1947, Castro joined the Party of the Cuban People (Partido Ortodoxo), founded by Eduardo Chibás. Though Chibás came third in the 1948 general election, Castro remained committed to working on his behalf. Student violence escalated when Grau employed gang leaders as police officers, and Castro received a death threat urging him to leave the university, but he refused and began to carry a gun and surround himself with armed friends. Anti-Castro dissidents accused him of committing gang-related assassinations at the time, but these accusations remain unproven.

=== Rebellion and Marxism: 1947–1950 ===
I joined the people; I grabbed a rifle in a police station that collapsed when it was rushed by a crowd. I witnessed the spectacle of a totally spontaneous revolution ... [T]hat experience led me to identify myself even more with the cause of the people. My still incipient Marxist ideas had nothing to do with our conduct—it was a spontaneous reaction on our part, as young people with Martí-an, anti-imperialist, anti-colonialist and pro-democratic ideas.

— Fidel Castro on the Bogotazo, 2009

In June 1947, Castro joined a planned expedition to overthrow the government of Rafael Trujillo in the Dominican Republic. The military force intended to sail from Cuba in July 1947, but Grau's government stopped the invasion under US pressure, and Castro evaded arrest. Returning to Havana, Castro took a leading role in student protests against the killing of a high school pupil by government bodyguards. The protests and subsequent crackdown on suspected communists led to violent clashes between activists and police in February 1948, in which Castro was badly beaten. His subsequent public speeches took a leftist slant, condemning social and economic inequality in Cuba.

In April 1948, Castro travelled to Bogotá, Colombia, leading a Cuban student group sponsored by President Juan Perón's Argentine government. There, the assassination of leftist leader Jorge Eliécer Gaitán Ayala led to rioting and clashes between the governing Conservatives—backed by the army—and leftist Liberals. Castro joined the Liberal cause by stealing guns from a police station; subsequent police investigations concluded that he had not been involved in killings. In April 1948, the Organization of American States was founded at a summit in Bogotá, leading to protests, which Castro joined.

Marxism taught me what society was. I was like a blindfolded man in a forest, who doesn't even know where north or south is. If you don't eventually come to truly understand the history of the class struggle, or at least have a clear idea that society is divided between the rich and the poor, and that some people subjugate and exploit other people, you're lost in a forest, not knowing anything.

— Fidel Castro on discovering Marxism, 2009

Returning to Cuba, Castro became a prominent figure in protests against government attempts to raise bus fares. He married Mirta Díaz Balart, through whom he was exposed to the lifestyle of the Cuban elite. The subsequent election was won by Partido Auténtico's new candidate, Carlos Prío Socarrás. Castro had moved further to the left and interpreted Cuba's problems as an integral part of capitalist society, or the "dictatorship of the bourgeoisie", rather than the failings of corrupt politicians, and adopted the Marxist view that meaningful political change could only be brought about by proletariat revolution. Visiting Havana's poorest neighbourhoods, he became active in the student anti-racist campaign.

In September 1949, Mirta gave birth to a son, Fidelito, so the couple moved to a larger Havana flat. Castro continued to put himself at risk, staying active in the city's politics and joining the 30 September Movement, which contained within it both communists and members of the Partido Ortodoxo. The group's purpose was to oppose the influence of the violent gangs within the university; despite his promises, Prío had failed to control the situation, instead offering many of their senior members jobs in government ministries.

Castro volunteered to deliver a speech for the Movement on 13 November, exposing the government's secret deals with the gangs and identifying key members. Attracting the attention of the national press, the speech angered the gangs and Castro fled into hiding, first in the countryside and then in the US. Returning to Havana several weeks later, Castro laid low and focused on his university studies, graduating as a Doctor of Law in September 1950.

=== Career in law and politics: 1950–1952 ===
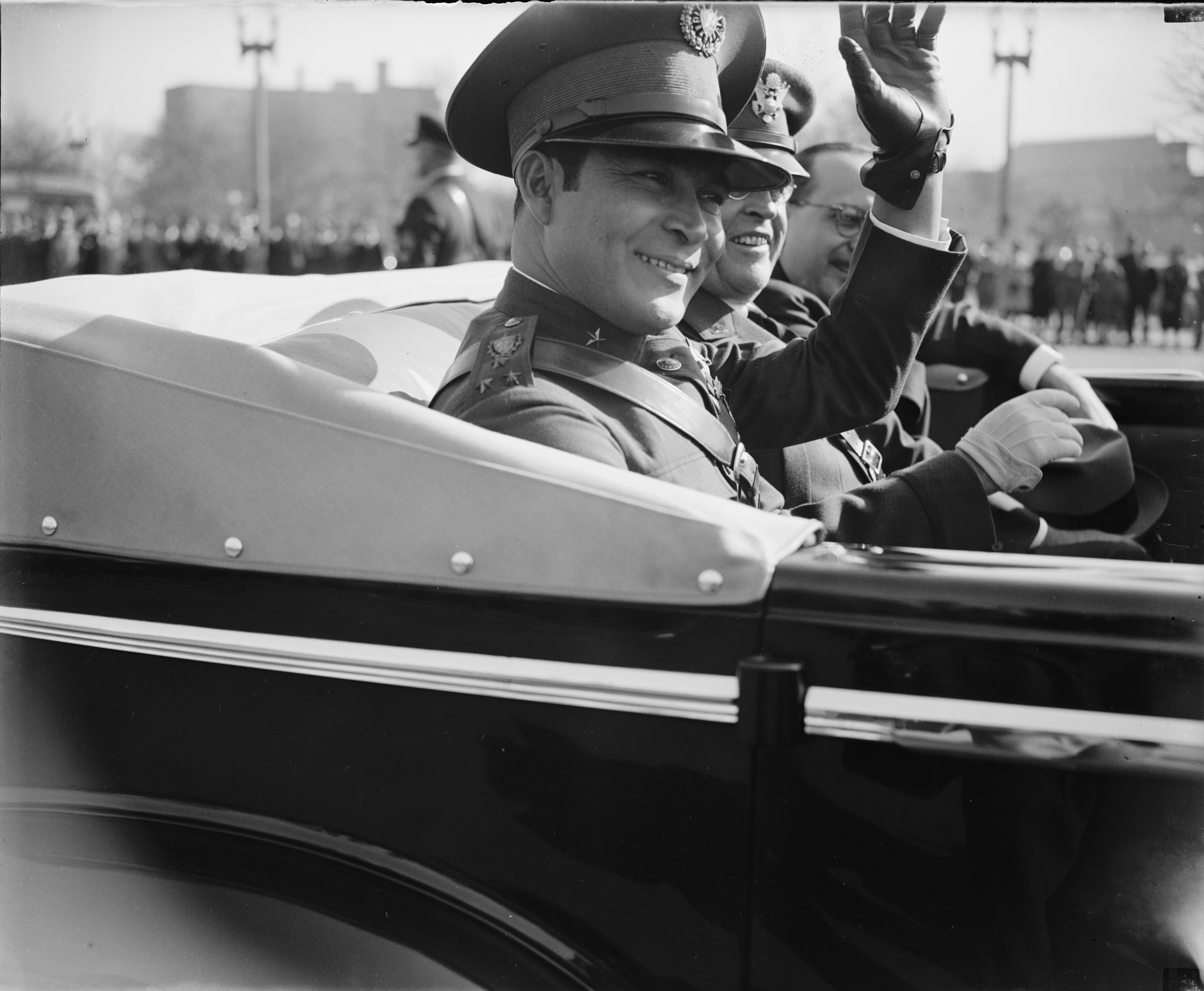
General Fulgencio Batista—left, with US Army Chief of Staff Malin Craig, in Washington, D.C. in 1938—whose presidency Castro intended to overthrow

Castro co-founded a legal partnership that primarily catered to poor Cubans, albeit it proved a financial failure. Caring little for money or material goods, Castro failed to pay his bills; his furniture was repossessed and electricity cut off, distressing his wife. He took part in a high school protest in Cienfuegos in November 1950, fighting with police to protest the Education Ministry's ban on student associations; he was arrested and charged for violent conduct, but the magistrate dismissed the charges. His hopes for Cuba still centered on Chibás and the Partido Ortodoxo, and he was present at Chibás' politically motivated suicide in 1951.

Seeing himself as Chibás' heir, Castro wanted to run for Congress in the June 1952 elections, though senior Ortodoxo members feared his radical reputation and refused to nominate him. He was instead nominated as a candidate for the House of Representatives by party members in Havana's poorest districts and began campaigning. The Ortodoxo had considerable support and was predicted to do well in the election.

During his campaign, Castro met with General Fulgencio Batista, the former president who had returned to politics with the Unitary Action Party. Batista offered him a place in his administration if he was successful; although both opposed Prío's administration, their meeting never got beyond polite generalities. On 10 March 1952, Batista seized power in a military coup, with Prío fleeing to Mexico. Declaring himself president, Batista cancelled the planned presidential elections, describing his new system as "disciplined democracy"; Castro was deprived of being elected in his run for office by Batista's move, and like many others, considered it a one-man dictatorship.

Batista moved to the right, solidifying ties with both the wealthy elite and the United States, severing diplomatic relations with the Soviet Union, suppressing trade unions and persecuting Cuban socialist groups. Intent on opposing Batista, Castro brought several legal cases against the government, but these came to nothing, and Castro began thinking of alternative ways to oust the regime.

== Cuban Revolution ==
=== The Movement and the Moncada Barracks attack: 1952–1953 ===
Castro formed a group called "The Movement", which operated along a clandestine cell system, publishing underground newspaper El Acusador (The Accuser), while arming and training anti-Batista recruits. From July 1952 they went on a recruitment drive, gaining around 1,200 members in a year, the majority from Havana's poorer districts. Although a revolutionary socialist, Castro avoided an alliance with the communist Popular Socialist Party (PSP), fearing it would frighten away political moderates, but kept in contact with PSP members like his brother Raúl. Castro stockpiled weapons for a planned attack on the Moncada Barracks, a military garrison outside Santiago de Cuba, Oriente. Castro's militants intended to dress in army uniforms and arrive at the base on 25 July, seizing control and raiding the armoury before reinforcements arrived. Supplied with new weaponry, Castro intended to spark a revolution among Oriente's impoverished cane cutters and promote further uprisings. Castro's plan emulated those of the 19th-century Cuban independence fighters who had raided Spanish barracks; Castro saw himself as the heir to independence leader José Martí.

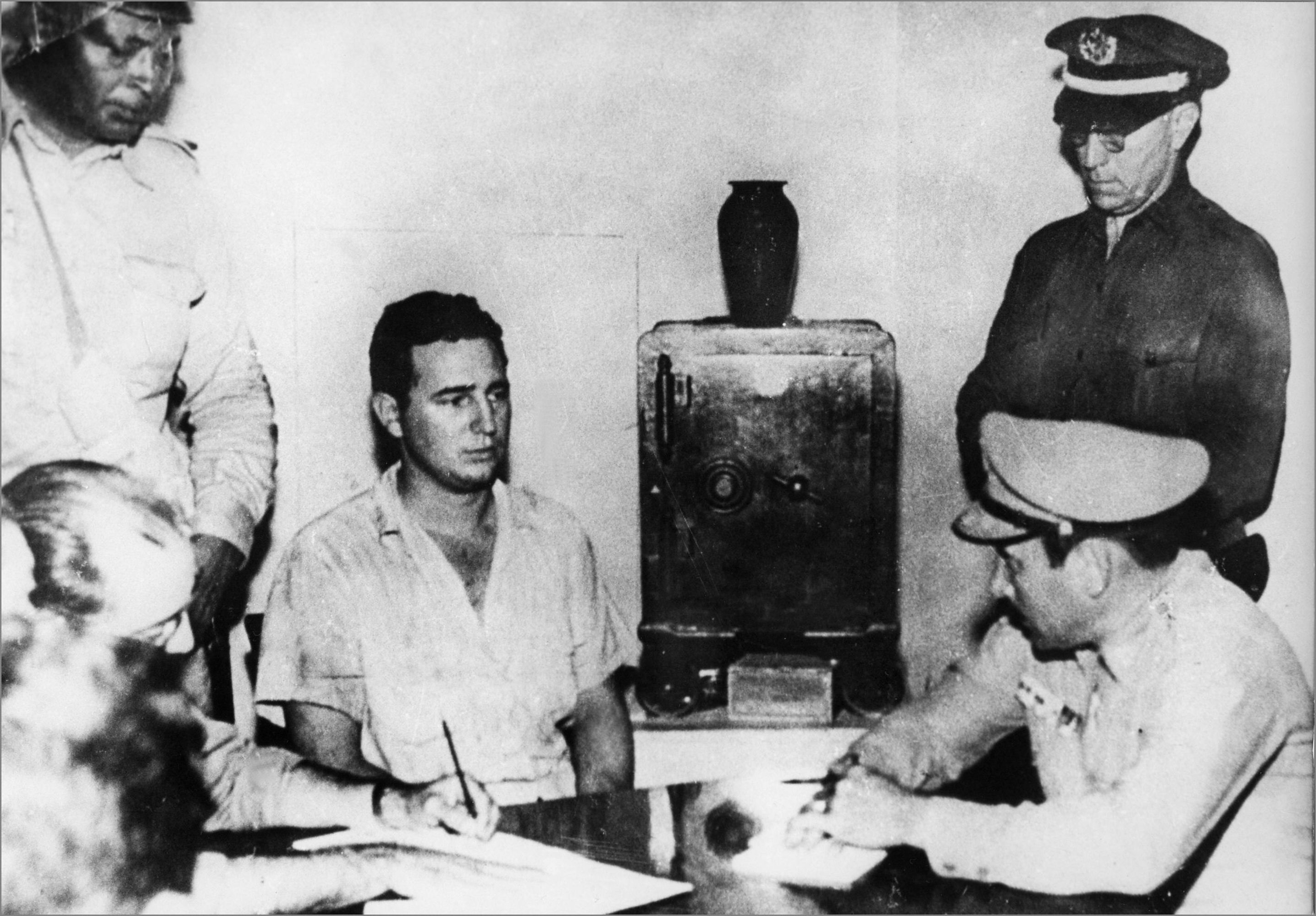
Castro under arrest after the Moncada attack, 1953

Castro gathered 165 revolutionaries for the mission, ordering his troops not to cause bloodshed unless they met armed resistance. The attack took place on 26 July 1953, but ran into trouble; 3 of the 16 cars that had set out from Santiago failed to get there. Reaching the barracks, the alarm was raised, with most of the rebels pinned down by machine gun fire. Four were killed before Castro ordered a retreat. The rebels suffered 6 fatalities and 15 other casualties, whilst the army suffered 19 dead and 27 wounded. Meanwhile, some rebels took over a civilian hospital; subsequently stormed by government soldiers, the rebels were rounded up, tortured and 22 were executed without trial. Accompanied by 19 comrades, Castro set out for Gran Piedra in the rugged Sierra Maestra mountains several kilometres to the north, where they could establish a guerrilla base. Responding to the attack, Batista's government proclaimed martial law, ordering a violent crackdown on dissent, and imposing strict media censorship. The government broadcast misinformation about the event, claiming that the rebels were communists who had killed hospital patients, although news and photographs of the army's use of torture and summary executions in Oriente soon spread, causing widespread public and some governmental disapproval.

Over the following days, the rebels were rounded up; some were executed and others—including Castro—transported to a prison north of Santiago. Believing Castro incapable of planning the attack alone, the government accused Ortodoxo and PSP politicians of involvement, putting 122 defendants on trial on 21 September at the Palace of Justice, Santiago. Acting as his own defence counsel, Castro cited Martí as the intellectual author of the attack and convinced the three judges to overrule the army's decision to keep all defendants handcuffed in court, proceeding to argue that the charge with which they were accused—of "organizing an uprising of armed persons against the Constitutional Powers of the State"—was incorrect, for they had risen up against Batista, who had seized power in an unconstitutional manner. The trial embarrassed the army by revealing that they had tortured suspects, after which they tried unsuccessfully to prevent Castro from testifying any further, claiming he was too ill. The trial ended on 5 October, with the acquittal of most defendants; 55 were sentenced to prison terms of between 7 months and 13 years. Castro was sentenced on 16 October, during which he delivered a speech that would be printed under the title of History Will Absolve Me. Castro was sentenced to 15 years' imprisonment in the hospital wing of the Model Prison (Presidio Modelo), a relatively comfortable and modern institution on the Isla de Pinos.

=== Imprisonment and 26 July Movement: 1953–1955 ===
Imprisoned with 25 comrades, Castro renamed his group the "26th of July Movement" (MR-26-7) in memory of the Moncada attack's date, and formed a school for prisoners. He read widely, enjoying the works of Marx, Lenin, and Martí but also reading books by Freud, Kant, Shakespeare, Munthe, Maugham, and Dostoyevsky, analysing them within a Marxist framework. Corresponding with supporters, he maintained control over the Movement and organized the publication of History Will Absolve Me. Initially permitted a relative amount of freedom within the prison, he was locked up in solitary confinement after inmates sang anti-Batista songs on a visit by the president in February 1954. Meanwhile, Castro's wife Mirta gained employment in the Ministry of the Interior, something he discovered through a radio announcement. Appalled, he raged that he would rather die "a thousand times" than "suffer impotently from such an insult". Both Fidel and Mirta initiated divorce proceedings, with Mirta taking custody of their son Fidelito; this angered Castro, who did not want his son growing up in a bourgeois environment.

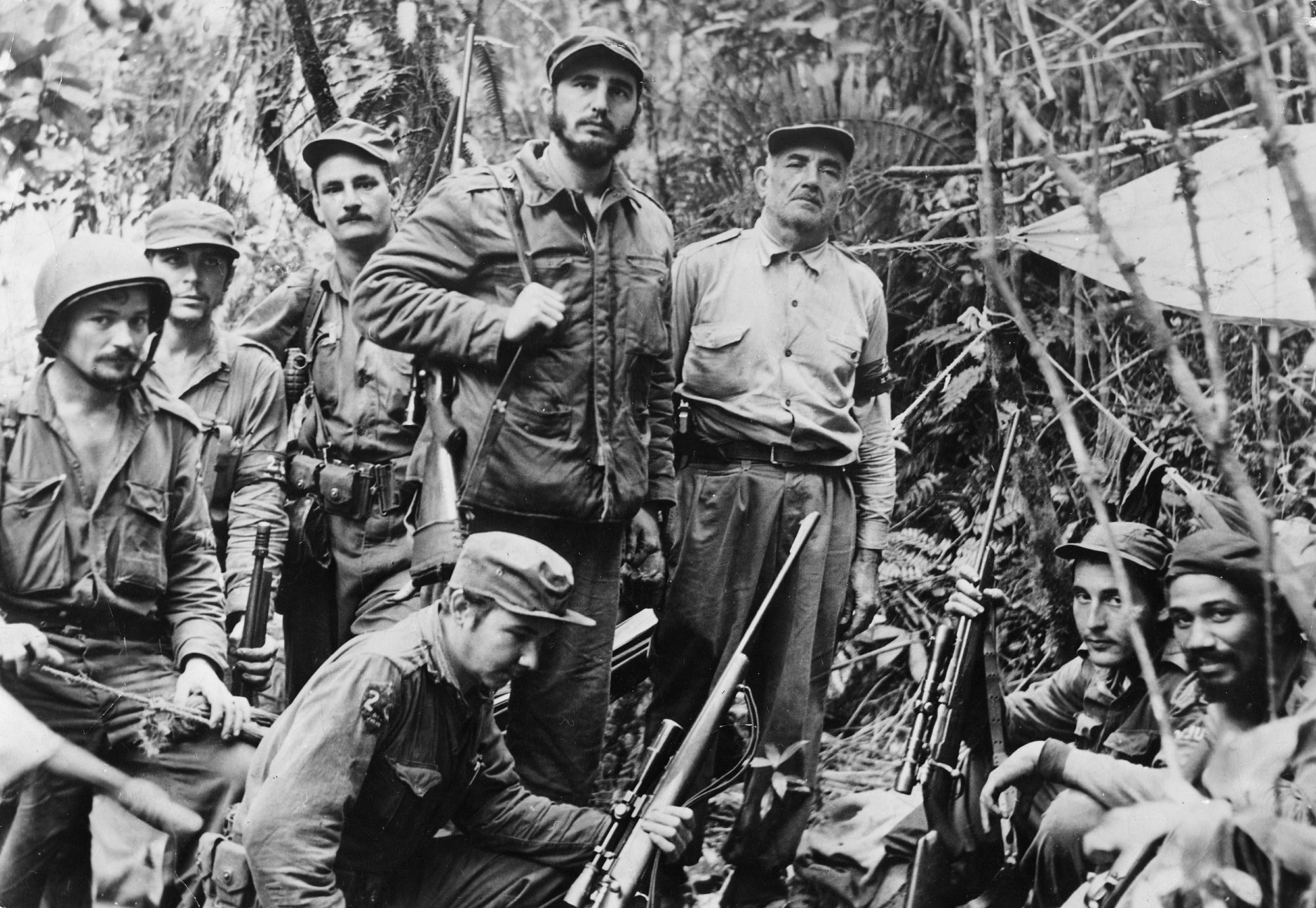
Fidel Castro and his men in the Sierra Maestra, 2 December 1956

In 1954, Batista's government held presidential elections, but no politician stood against him; the election was widely considered fraudulent. It had allowed some political opposition to be voiced, and Castro's supporters had agitated for an amnesty for the Moncada incident's perpetrators. Some politicians suggested an amnesty would be good publicity, and the Congress and Batista agreed. Backed by the US and major corporations, Batista believed Castro to be no threat, and on 15 May 1955, the prisoners were released. Returning to Havana, Castro gave radio interviews and press conferences; the government closely monitored him, curtailing his activities. Now divorced, Castro had sexual affairs with two female supporters, Naty Revuelta and Maria Laborde, each conceiving him a child. Setting about strengthening the MR-26-7, he established an 11-person National Directorate but retained autocratic control, with some dissenters labelling him a caudillo (dictator); he argued that a successful revolution could not be run by committee and required a strong leader.

In 1955, bombings and violent demonstrations led to a crackdown on dissent, with Castro and Raúl fleeing the country to evade arrest. Castro sent a letter to the press, declaring that he was "leaving Cuba because all doors of peaceful struggle have been closed to me ... As a follower of Martí, I believe the hour has come to take our rights and not beg for them, to fight instead of pleading for them." The Castros and several comrades travelled to Mexico, where Raúl befriended an Argentine doctor and Marxist–Leninist named Ernesto "Che" Guevara, who was working as a journalist and photographer for "Agencia Latina de Noticias". Fidel liked him, later describing him as "a more advanced revolutionary than I was". Castro also associated with the Spaniard Alberto Bayo, who agreed to teach Castro's rebels the necessary skills in guerrilla warfare. Requiring funding, Castro toured the US in search of wealthy sympathizers, there being monitored by Batista's agents, who allegedly orchestrated a failed assassination attempt against him. Castro kept in contact with the MR-26-7 in Cuba, where they had gained a large support base in Oriente. Other militant anti-Batista groups had sprung up, primarily from the student movement; most notable was the Directorio Revolucionario Estudiantil (DRE), founded by José Antonio Echeverría. Antonio met with Castro in Mexico City, but Castro opposed the student's support for indiscriminate assassination.

After purchasing the decrepit yacht Granma, on 25 November 1956, Castro set sail from Tuxpan, Veracruz, with 81 armed revolutionaries. The 1,900-kilometre (1,200 mi) crossing to Cuba was harsh, with food running low and many suffering seasickness. At some points, they had to bail water caused by a leak, and at another, a man fell overboard, delaying their journey. The plan had been for the crossing to take five days, and on the Granma's scheduled day of arrival, 30 November, MR-26-7 members under Frank País led an armed uprising in Santiago and Manzanillo. However, the Granma's journey ultimately lasted seven days, and with Castro and his men unable to provide reinforcements, País and his militants dispersed after two days of intermittent attacks.

=== Guerrilla war: 1956–1959 ===
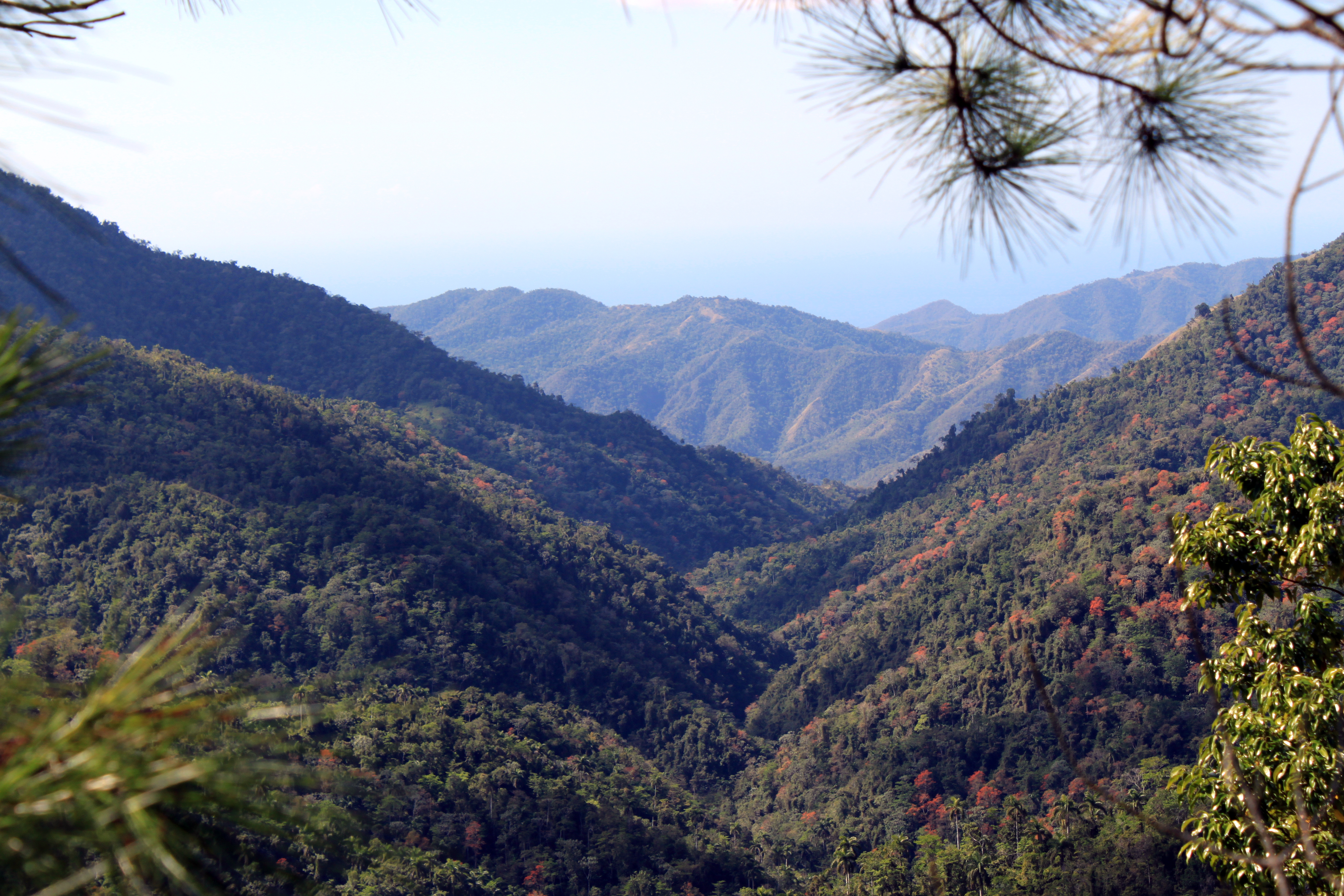
The thickly forested mountain range of the Sierra Maestra, from where Castro and his revolutionaries led guerrilla attacks against Batista's forces for two years. Castro biographer Robert E. Quirk noted that there was "no better place to hide" in all the island.

The Granma ran aground in a mangrove swamp at Playa Las Coloradas, close to Los Cayuelos, on 2 December 1956. Fleeing inland, its crew headed for the forested mountain range of Oriente's Sierra Maestra, being repeatedly attacked by Batista's troops. Upon arrival, Castro discovered that only 19 rebels had made it to their destination, the rest having been killed or captured. Setting up an encampment, the survivors included the Castros, Che Guevara, and Camilo Cienfuegos. They began launching raids on small army posts to obtain weaponry, and in January 1957 they overran the outpost at La Plata, treating any soldiers that they wounded but executing Chicho Osorio, the local mayoral (land company overseer), who was despised by the local peasants and who boasted of killing one of Castro's rebels. Osorio's execution aided the rebels in gaining the trust of locals, although they largely remained unenthusiastic and suspicious of the revolutionaries. As trust grew, some locals joined the rebels, although most new recruits came from urban areas. With volunteers boosting the rebel forces to over 200, in July 1957 Castro divided his army into three columns, commanded by himself, his brother, and Guevara. The MR-26-7 members operating in urban areas continued agitation, sending supplies to Castro, and on 16 February 1957, he met with other senior members to discuss tactics; here he met Celia Sánchez, who would become a close friend.

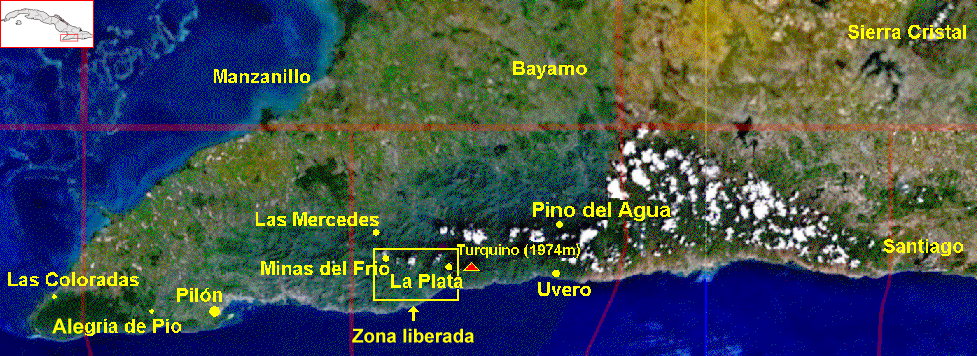
Map showing key locations in the Sierra Maestra during the 1958 stage of the Cuban Revolution

Across Cuba, anti-Batista groups carried out bombings and sabotage; police responded with mass arrests, torture, and extrajudicial executions. In March 1957, the DRE launched a failed attack on the presidential palace, during which Antonio was shot dead. Batista's government often resorted to brutal methods to keep Cuba's cities under control. In the Sierra Maestra mountains, Castro was joined by Frank Sturgis who offered to train Castro's troops in guerrilla warfare. Castro accepted the offer, but he also had an immediate need for guns and ammunition, so Sturgis became a gunrunner. Sturgis purchased boatloads of weapons and ammunition from Central Intelligence Agency (CIA) weapons expert Samuel Cummings' International Armament Corporation in Alexandria, Virginia. Sturgis opened a training camp in the Sierra Maestra mountains, where he taught Che Guevara and other 26 July Movement rebel soldiers guerrilla warfare. Frank País was also killed, leaving Castro the MR-26-7's unchallenged leader. Although Guevara and Raúl were well known for their Marxist–Leninist views, Castro hid his, hoping to gain the support of less radical revolutionaries. In 1957 he met with leading members of the Partido Ortodoxo, Raúl Chibás and Felipe Pazos, authoring the Sierra Maestra Manifesto, in which they demanded that a provisional civilian government be set up to implement moderate agrarian reform, industrialization, and a literacy campaign before holding multiparty elections. As Cuba's press was censored, Castro contacted foreign media to spread his message; he became a celebrity after being interviewed by Herbert Matthews, a journalist from The New York Times. Reporters from CBS and Paris Match soon followed.

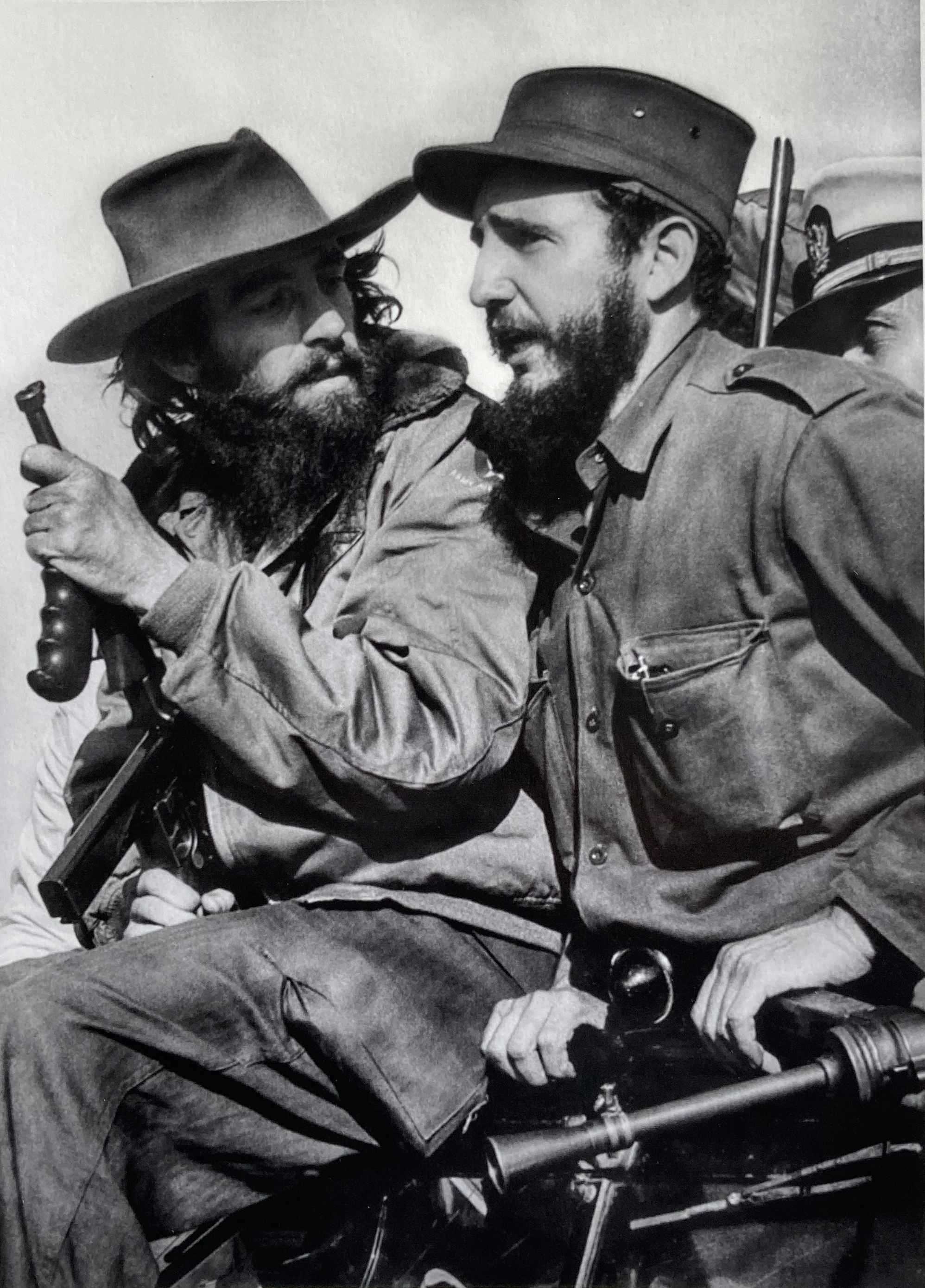
Castro (right) with fellow revolutionary Camilo Cienfuegos entering Havana on 8 January 1959

Castro's guerrillas increased their attacks on military outposts, forcing the government to withdraw from the Sierra Maestra region, and by spring 1958, the rebels controlled a hospital, schools, a printing press, slaughterhouse, land-mine factory and a cigar-making factory. By 1958, Batista was under increasing pressure, a result of his military failures coupled with increasing domestic and foreign criticism surrounding his administration's press censorship, torture, and extrajudicial executions. Influenced by anti-Batista sentiment among their citizens, the US government ceased supplying him with weaponry. The opposition called a general strike, accompanied by armed attacks from the MR-26-7. Beginning on 9 April, it received strong support in central and eastern Cuba, but little elsewhere.

Batista responded with an all-out-attack, Operation Verano, in which the army aerially bombarded forested areas and villages suspected of aiding the militants, while 10,000 soldiers commanded by General Eulogio Cantillo surrounded the Sierra Maestra, driving north to the rebel encampments. Despite their numerical and technological superiority, the army had no experience with guerrilla warfare, and Castro halted their offensive using land mines and ambushes. Many of Batista's soldiers defected to Castro's rebels, who also benefited from local popular support. In the summer, the MR-26-7 went on the offensive, pushing the army out of the mountains, with Castro using his columns in a pincer movement to surround the main army concentration in Santiago. By November, Castro's forces controlled most of Oriente and Las Villas, and divided Cuba in two by closing major roads and rail lines, severely disadvantaging Batista.

The US instructed Cantillo to oust Batista due to fears in Washington that Castro was a socialist, which were exacerbated by the association between nationalist and communist movements in Latin America and the links between the Cold War and decolonization. By this time the great majority of Cuban people had turned against the Batista regime. Ambassador to Cuba, E. T. Smith, who felt the whole CIA mission had become too close to the MR-26-7 movement, personally went to Batista and informed him that the US would no longer support him and felt he no longer could control the situation in Cuba. General Cantillo secretly agreed to a ceasefire with Castro, promising that Batista would be tried as a war criminal; however, Batista was warned, and fled into exile with over US$300 million on 31 December 1958. Cantillo entered Havana's Presidential Palace, proclaimed the Supreme Court judge Carlos Piedra to be president, and began appointing the new government. Furious, Castro ended the ceasefire, and ordered Cantillo's arrest by sympathetic figures in the army. Accompanying celebrations at news of Batista's downfall on 1 January 1959, Castro ordered the MR-26-7 to prevent widespread looting and vandalism. Cienfuegos and Guevara led their columns into Havana on 2 January, while Castro entered Santiago and gave a speech invoking the wars of independence. Heading toward Havana, he greeted cheering crowds at every town, giving press conferences and interviews. Castro reached Havana on 9 January 1959.

== Provisional government ==
=== Consolidating leadership: 1959 ===
At Castro's command, the politically moderate lawyer Manuel Urrutia Lleó was proclaimed provisional president, but Castro announced falsely that Urrutia had been selected by "popular election". Most of Urrutia's cabinet were MR-26-7 members. Entering Havana, Castro proclaimed himself Representative of the Rebel Armed Forces of the Presidency, setting up home and office in the penthouse of the Havana Hilton Hotel. Castro exercised a great deal of influence over Urrutia's regime, now ruling by decree. He ensured the government implemented policies to cut corruption and fight illiteracy, and that it attempted to remove Batistanos from positions of power by dismissing Congress and barring all those elected in the rigged elections of 1954 and 1958 from future office. He then pushed Urrutia to issue a temporary ban on political parties; he repeatedly said that they would eventually hold multiparty elections. Although repeatedly denying that he was a communist to the press, he began clandestinely meeting members of the PSP to discuss the creation of a socialist state.

We are not executing innocent people or political opponents. We are executing murderers and they deserve it.

— Castro's response to his critics regarding the mass executions, 1959

In suppressing the revolution, Batista's government had killed thousands of Cubans; Castro and influential sectors of the press put the death toll at 20,000, but a list of victims published shortly after the revolution contained only 898 names—over half of them combatants. More recent estimates place the death toll between 1,000 and 4,000. In response to popular uproar, which demanded that those responsible be brought to justice, Castro helped to set up many trials, resulting in hundreds of executions. Although popular domestically, critics—in particular the US press, argued that many were not fair trials. Castro responded that "revolutionary justice is not based on legal precepts, but on moral conviction." Acclaimed by many across Latin America, he travelled to Venezuela where he met with President-elect Rómulo Betancourt, unsuccessfully requesting a loan and a new deal for Venezuelan oil. Returning home, an argument between Castro and senior government figures broke out. He was infuriated that the government had left thousands unemployed by closing down casinos and brothels. As a result, Prime Minister José Miró Cardona resigned, going into exile in the US and joining the anti-Castro movement.

On 16 February 1959, Castro was sworn in as Prime Minister of Cuba. Castro also appointed himself president of the National Tourist Industry, introducing unsuccessful measures to encourage African-American tourists to visit, advertising Cuba as a tropical paradise free of racial discrimination. Judges and politicians had their pay reduced while low-level civil servants saw theirs raised, and in March 1959, Castro declared rents for those who paid less than $100 a month halved. The Cuban government also began to expropriate the casinos and properties from mafia leaders and taking millions in cash. Before his death, Russian-American gangster Meyer Lansky said Cuba "ruined" him.

On 9 April, Castro announced that the elections, which the 26th of July Movement had promised would occur after the revolution, would be postponed, so that the provisional government could focus on domestic reform. Castro announced this electoral delay with the slogan: "revolution first, elections later".

Later in April, he visited the US on a charm offensive where President Dwight D. Eisenhower would not meet with him, but instead sent Vice President Richard Nixon, whom Castro instantly disliked. After meeting Castro, Nixon described him to Eisenhower: "The one fact we can be sure of is that Castro has those indefinable qualities which made him a leader of men. Whatever we may think of him he is going to be a great factor in the development of Cuba and very possibly in Latin American affairs generally. He seems to be sincere. He is either incredibly naive about Communism or under Communist discipline-my guess is the former...His ideas as to how to run a government or an economy are less developed than those of almost any world figure I have met in fifty countries. But because he has the power to lead...we have no choice but at least try to orient him in the right direction".

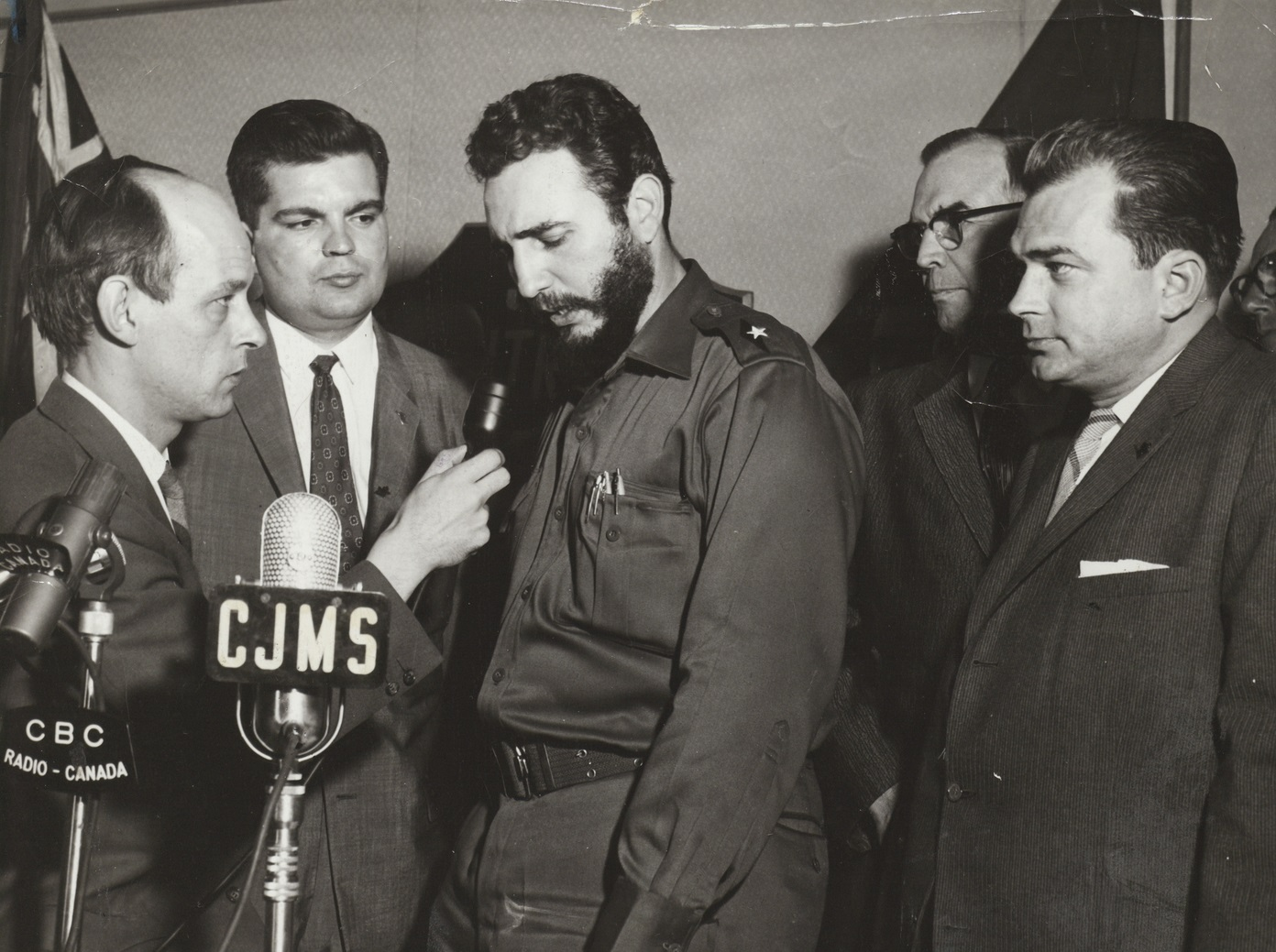
CBC/Radio-Canada's journalist and future Premier of Quebec, René Lévesque, interviews Castro during his trip to Montreal in late April 1959.

Proceeding to Canada, Trinidad, Brazil, Uruguay and Argentina, Castro attended an economic conference in Buenos Aires, unsuccessfully proposing a $30 billion US-funded "Marshall Plan" for Latin America. In May 1959, Castro signed into law the First Agrarian Reform, setting a cap for landholdings to 993 acres (402 ha) per owner and prohibiting foreigners from obtaining Cuban land ownership. Around 200,000 peasants received title deeds as large land holdings were broken up; popular among the working class, it alienated the richer landowners, including Castro's own mother, whose farmlands were taken. Within a year, Castro and his government had effectively redistributed 15 per cent of the nation's wealth, declaring that "the revolution is the dictatorship of the exploited against the exploiters."

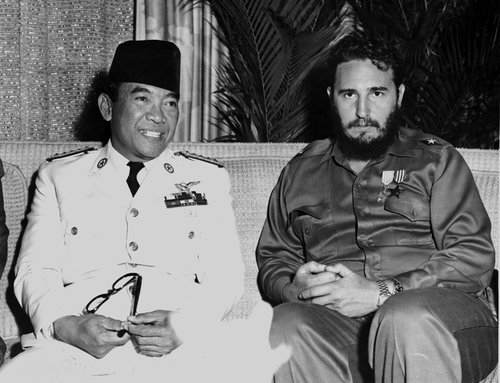
Castro and Indonesian president Sukarno in Havana, 1960. Castro undertook many foreign visits during his initial years in power.

In the summer of 1959, Fidel began nationalizing plantation lands owned by American investors as well as confiscating the property of foreign landowners. He also seized property previously held by wealthy Cubans who had fled. He nationalized sugar production and oil refinement, over the objection of foreign investors who owned stakes in these commodities.

Although then refusing to categorize his regime as socialist and repeatedly denying being a communist, Castro appointed Marxists to senior government and military positions. President Urrutia increasingly expressed concern with the rising influence of Marxism. Angered, Castro in turn announced his resignation as prime minister on 18 July—blaming Urrutia for complicating government with his "fevered anti-Communism". Over 500,000 Castro-supporters surrounded the Presidential Palace demanding Urrutia's resignation, which he submitted. On 23 July, Castro resumed his premiership and appointed Marxist Osvaldo Dorticós as president.

On 19 October 1959, army commander Huber Matos wrote a resignation letter to Fidel Castro, complaining of Communist influence in government. Matos lamented in his resignation that communists were gaining positions of power that he felt were undeserved for having not participated in the Cuban Revolution. Matos planned for his officers to also resign en masse in support. Two days later, Castro sent fellow revolutionary Camilo Cienfuegos to arrest Matos. The same day Matos was arrested, Cuban exile Pedro Luis Díaz Lanz, a former air force chief of staff under Castro and friend of Huber Matos, flew from Florida and dropped leaflets into Havana that called for the removal of all Communists from the government. In response, Castro held a rally where he called for the reintroduction of revolutionary tribunals to try Matos and Diaz for treason. Shortly after Hubert Matos' detention various other disillusioned economists would send in their resignations. Felipe Pazos would resign as head of the National Bank and be replaced within a month by Che Guevara. Cabinet members Manuel Ray and Faustino Perez also resigned.

Castro's government continued to emphasise social projects to improve Cuba's standard of living, often to the detriment of economic development. Major emphasis was placed on education, and during the first 30 months of Castro's government, more classrooms were opened than in the previous 30 years. The Cuban primary education system offered a work-study program, with half of the time spent in the classroom, and the other half in a productive activity. Health care was nationalized and expanded, with rural health centers and urban polyclinics opening up across the island to offer free medical aid. Universal vaccination against childhood diseases was implemented, and infant mortality rates were reduced dramatically. A third part of this social program was the improvement of infrastructure. Within the first six months of Castro's government, 1,000 km (600 mi) of roads were built across the island, while $300 million was spent on water and sanitation projects. Over 800 houses were constructed every month in the early years of the administration in an effort to cut homelessness, while nurseries and day-care centers were opened for children and other centers opened for the disabled and elderly.

=== Diplomatic and political shifts: 1960 ===
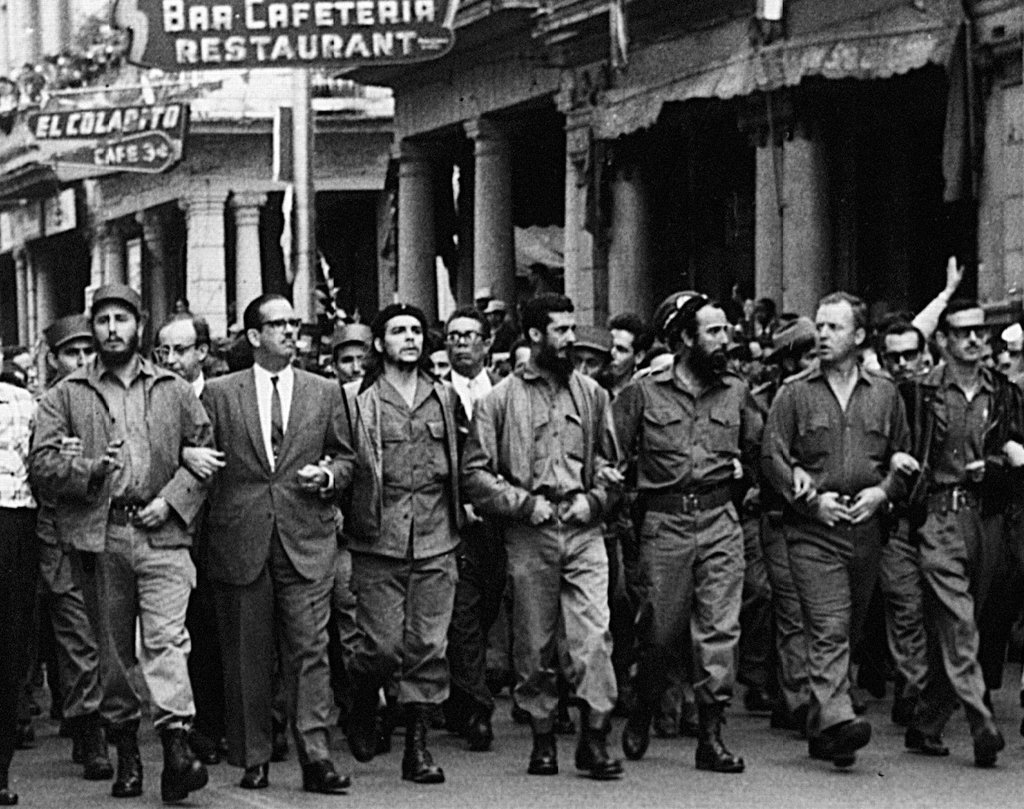
Castro (first from the left), Che Guevara (center), William Alexander Morgan (second from the right), and other leading revolutionaries marching through the streets in protest over the La Coubre explosion, 5 March 1960

Castro used radio and television to develop a "dialogue with the people", posing questions and making provocative statements. His regime remained popular with workers, peasants, and students, who constituted the majority of the country's population, while opposition came primarily from the middle class; thousands of doctors, engineers and other professionals emigrated to Florida in the US, causing an economic brain drain. Productivity decreased and the country's financial reserves were drained within two years. After conservative press expressed hostility towards the government, the pro-Castro printers' trade union disrupted editorial staff, and in January 1960 the government ordered them to publish a "coletilla" (clarification) written by the printers' union at the end of articles critical of the government. Castro's government arrested hundreds of counter-revolutionaries, many of whom were subjected to solitary confinement, rough treatment, and threatening behaviour. Militant anti-Castro groups, funded by exiles, the CIA, and the Dominican government, undertook armed attacks and set up guerrilla bases in Cuba's mountains, leading to the six-year Escambray Rebellion.

At the time, 1960, the Cold War raged between two superpowers: the United States, a capitalist liberal democracy, and the Soviet Union (USSR), a Marxist–Leninist socialist state ruled by the Communist Party. Expressing contempt for the US, Castro shared the ideological views of the USSR, establishing relations with several Marxist–Leninist states. Meeting with Soviet First Deputy Premier Anastas Mikoyan, Castro agreed to provide the USSR with sugar, fruit, fibres, and hides in return for crude oil, fertilizers, industrial goods, and a $100 million loan. Cuba's government ordered the country's refineries—then controlled by the US corporations Shell and Esso—to process Soviet oil, but under US pressure they refused. Castro responded by expropriating and nationalizing the refineries. Retaliating, the US cancelled its import of Cuban sugar, provoking Castro to nationalize most US-owned assets on the island, including banks and sugar mills.

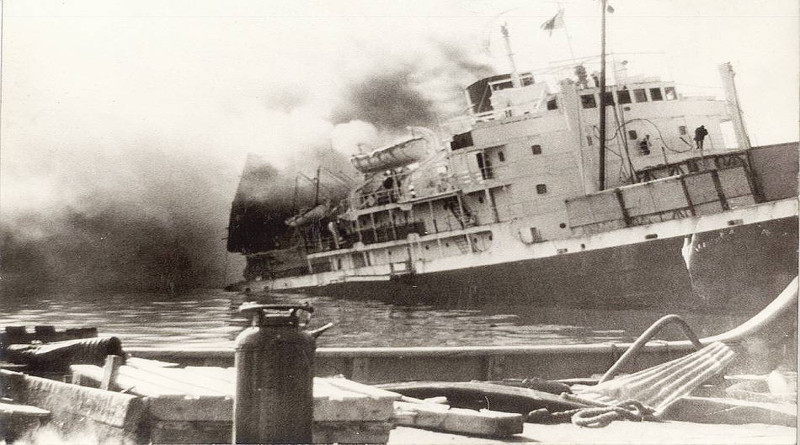
La Coubre explosion, 4 March 1960

Relations between Cuba and the US were further strained following the explosion of a French vessel, the La Coubre, in Havana harbour in March 1960. The ship carried weapons purchased from Belgium, and the cause of the explosion was never determined, but Castro publicly insinuated that the US government was guilty of sabotage. He ended this speech with "¡Patria o Muerte!" ("Fatherland or Death"), a proclamation that he made much use of in ensuing years. Inspired by their earlier success with the 1954 Guatemalan coup d'état, in March 1960, US President Eisenhower authorized the CIA to overthrow Castro's government. He provided them with a budget of $13 million and permitted them to ally with the Mafia, who were aggrieved that Castro's government closed down their brothel and casino businesses in Cuba.

During a May Day speech in 1960, Fidel Castro announced that all future elections would be cancelled. Castro proclaimed that his administration was a direct democracy, in which Cubans could assemble at demonstrations to express their will, thus there was no need for elections, claiming that representative democratic systems served the interests of socio-economic elites. US Secretary of State Christian Herter announced that Cuba was adopting the Soviet model of rule, with a one-party state, government control of trade unions, suppression of civil liberties, and the absence of freedom of speech and press.

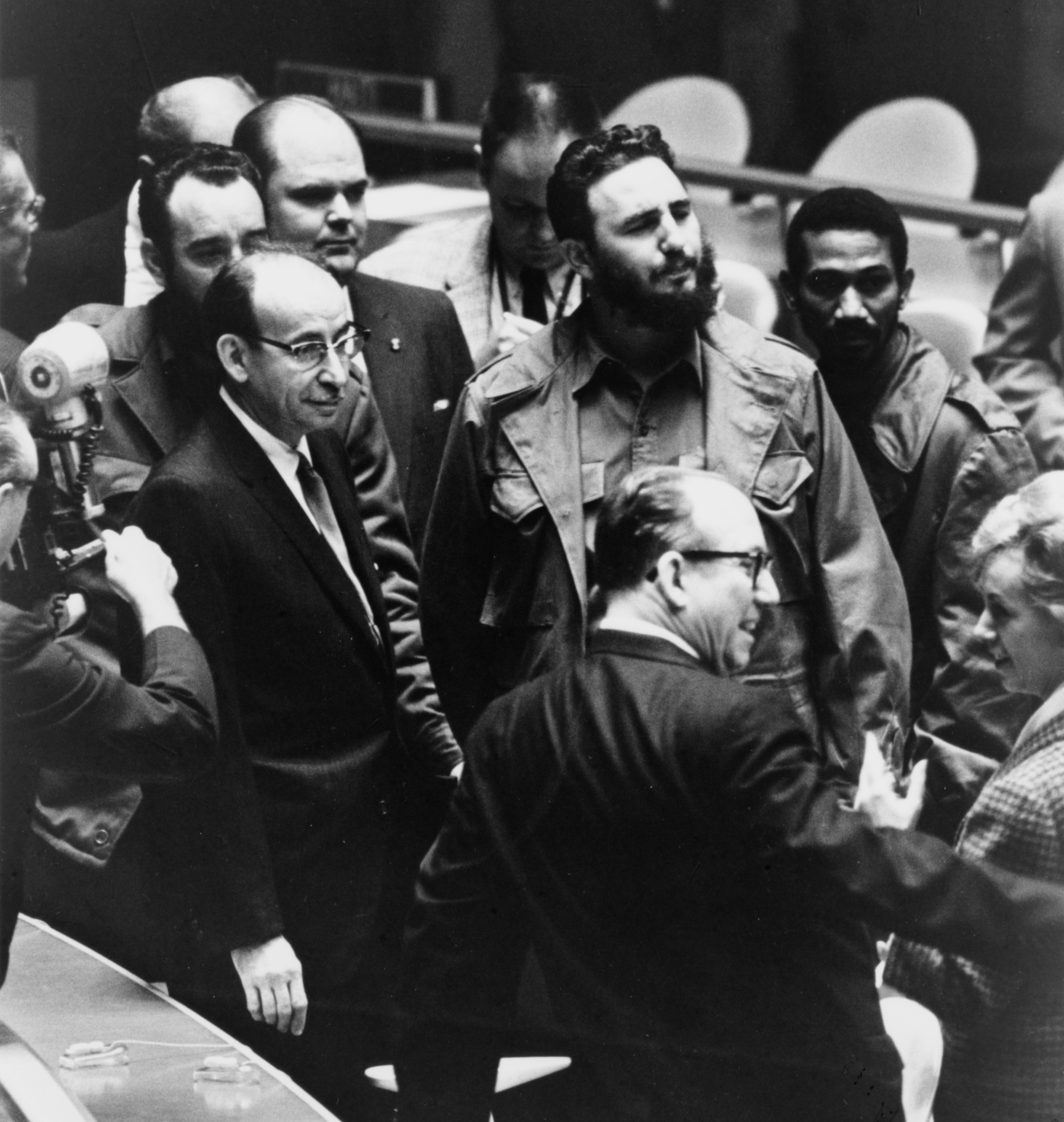
Castro at the United Nations General Assembly in 1960

In September 1960, Castro flew to New York City for the General Assembly of the United Nations. Staying at the Hotel Theresa in Harlem, he met with journalists and anti-establishment figures like Malcolm X. Castro had decided to stay in Harlem as a way of expressing solidarity with the poor African-American population living there, thus leading to an assortment of world leaders such as Nasser of Egypt and Nehru of India having to drive out to Harlem to see him. He also met Soviet premier Nikita Khrushchev, with the two publicly condemning the poverty and racism faced by Americans in areas like Harlem. Relations between Castro and Khrushchev were warm; they led the applause to one another's speeches at the General Assembly. The opening session of the United Nations General Assembly in September 1960 was a highly rancorous one with Khrushchev famously banging his shoe against his desk to interrupt a speech by Filipino delegate Lorenzo Sumulong, which set the general tone for the debates and speeches. Castro delivered the longest speech ever held before the United Nations General Assembly, speaking for four and a half hours in a speech mostly given over to denouncing American policies towards Latin America. Subsequently, visited by Polish first secretary Władysław Gomułka, Bulgarian first secretary Todor Zhivkov, Egyptian president Gamal Abdel Nasser, and Indian premier Jawaharlal Nehru, Castro also received an evening's reception from the Fair Play for Cuba Committee.

Back in Cuba, Castro feared a US-backed coup; in 1959 his regime spent $120 million on Soviet, French, and Belgian weaponry and by early 1960 had doubled the size of Cuba's armed forces. Fearing counter-revolutionary elements in the army, the government created a People's Militia to arm citizens favourable to the revolution, training at least 50,000 civilians in combat techniques. In September 1960, they created the Committees for the Defense of the Revolution (CDR), a nationwide civilian organization which implemented neighbourhood spying to detect counter-revolutionary activities as well as organizing health and education campaigns, becoming a conduit for public complaints. By 1970, a third of the population would be involved in the CDR, and this would eventually rise to 80%. On 13 October 1960, the US prohibited the majority of exports to Cuba, initiating an economic embargo. In retaliation, the National Institute for Agrarian Reform INRA took control of 383 private-run businesses on 14 October, and on 25 October a further 166 US companies operating in Cuba had their premises seized and nationalized. On 16 December, the US ended its import quota of Cuban sugar, the country's primary export.

=== Bay of Pigs Invasion and "Socialist Cuba": 1961–1962 ===
There was ... no doubt about who the victors were. Cuba's stature in the world soared to new heights, and Fidel's role as the adored and revered leader among ordinary Cuban people received a renewed boost. His popularity was greater than ever. In his own mind he had done what generations of Cubans had only fantasized about: he had taken on the United States and won.

— Peter Bourne, Castro biographer, 1986

In January 1961, Castro ordered Havana's US Embassy to reduce its 300-member staff, suspecting that many of them were spies. The US responded by ending diplomatic relations, and it increased CIA funding for exiled dissidents; these militants began attacking ships that traded with Cuba, and bombed factories, shops, and sugar mills. Despite internal tensions, and diplomatic tensions, Castro garnered support in New York City. On 18 February 1961, 400 people—mainly Cubans, Puerto Ricans, and college students—picketed in the rain outside of the United Nations rallying for Castro's anti-colonial values and his effort to reduce the United States' power over Cuba. The protesters held up signs that read, "Mr. Kennedy, Cuba is Not For Sale.", "Viva Fidel Castro!" and "Down With Yankee Imperialism!". Around 200 policemen were on the scene, but the protesters continued to chant slogans and throw pennies in support of Fidel Castro's socialist movement. Some Americans disagreed with President John F. Kennedy's decision to ban trade with Cuba, and outwardly supported his nationalist revolutionary tactics.

Both President Eisenhower and his successor President Kennedy supported a CIA plan to aid a dissident militia: the Democratic Revolutionary Front, to invade Cuba and overthrow Castro; the plan resulted in the Bay of Pigs Invasion in April 1961. On 15 April, CIA-supplied B-26s bombed three Cuban military airfields; the US announced that the perpetrators were defecting Cuban air force pilots, but Castro exposed these claims as false flag misinformation. Fearing invasion, he ordered the arrest of between 20,000 and 100,000 suspected counter-revolutionaries, publicly proclaiming, "What the imperialists cannot forgive us, is that we have made a Socialist revolution under their noses", his first announcement that the government was socialist.

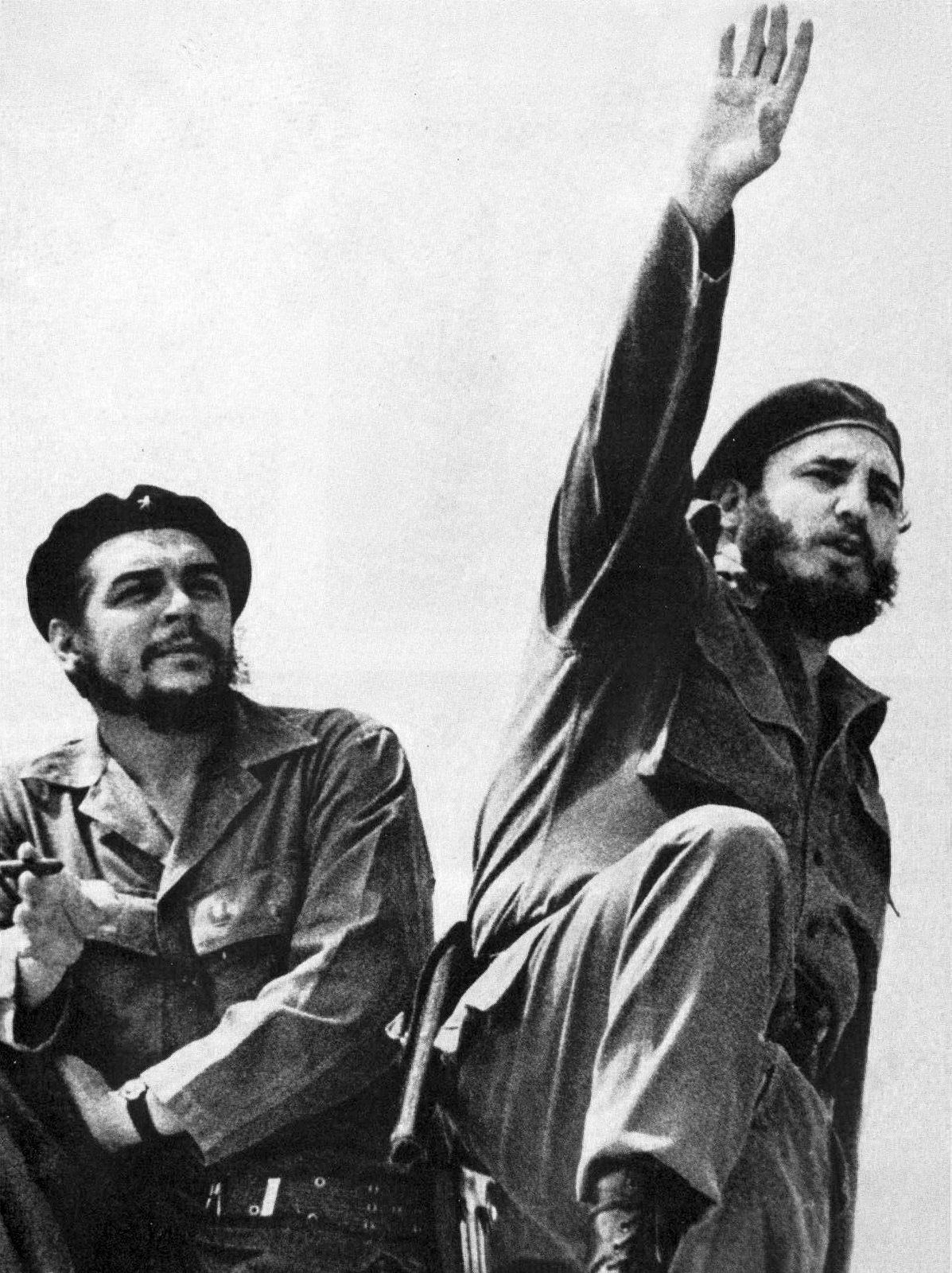
Che Guevara (left) and Castro, photographed by Alberto Korda in 1961

The CIA and the Democratic Revolutionary Front had based a 1,400-strong army, Brigade 2506, in Nicaragua. On the night of 16 to 17 April, Brigade 2506 landed along Cuba's Bay of Pigs and engaged in a firefight with a local revolutionary militia. Castro ordered Captain José Ramón Fernández to launch the counter-offensive, before taking personal control of it. After bombing the invaders' ships and bringing in reinforcements, Castro forced the Brigade to surrender on 20 April. He ordered the 1189 captured rebels to be interrogated by a panel of journalists on live television, personally taking over the questioning on 25 April. Fourteen were put on trial for crimes allegedly committed before the revolution, while the others were returned to the US in exchange for medicine and food valued at US$25 million. Castro's victory reverberated around the world, especially in Latin America, but it also increased internal opposition primarily among the middle-class Cubans who had been detained in the run-up to the invasion. Although most were freed within a few days, many fled to the US, establishing themselves in Florida.

After the banning of the film P.M., film critics hotly debated censorship in Cuba, which then caused the intervention of Castro, who met with the contesting writers and delivered his famed "Words to the Intellectuals" speech; which he delivered in June 1961. In the speech, Castro commented on Cuba's censorship policy, stating:

This means that within the Revolution, everything goes; against the Revolution, nothing. Nothing against the Revolution, because the Revolution has its rights also, and the first right of the Revolution is the right to exist, and no one can stand against the right of the Revolution to be and to exist, No one can rightfully claim a right against the Revolution. Since it takes in the interests of the people and Signifies the interests of the entire nation.

In an effort to consolidate "Socialist Cuba", Castro united the MR-26-7, PSP and Revolutionary Directorate into a governing party based on the Leninist principle of democratic centralism, what resulted was the Integrated Revolutionary Organizations (Organizaciones Revolucionarias Integradas – ORI), eventually renamed the United Party of the Cuban Socialist Revolution (PURSC) in 1962. The ORI began shaping Cuba using the Soviet model, persecuting political opponents and perceived social deviants such as prostitutes and homosexuals; Castro considered same-sex sexual activity a bourgeois trait. Although the USSR was hesitant regarding Castro's embrace of socialism, relations with the Soviets deepened. Castro sent Fidelito for a Moscow schooling, Soviet technicians arrived on the island, and Castro was awarded the Lenin Peace Prize.

In order to plan the Cuban economy, the commission JUCEPLAN was tasked with creating a four year plan. Regino Boti, the head of JUCEPLAN, announced in August 1961, that the country would soon have a 10% rate of economic growth, and the highest living standard in Latin America in 10 years. The plan drafted by JUCEPLAN in 1961, was a four year plan devised to be implemented in 1962 through 1965. It stressed agricultural diversification and rapid industrialization via Soviet assistance. In September 1961, Castro publicly complained that the industrialization plan had stalled because of lazy uncooperative workers.

In December 1961, Castro admitted that he had been a Marxist–Leninist for years, and in his Second Declaration of Havana he called on Latin America to rise up in revolution. In response, the US successfully pushed the Organization of American States to expel Cuba; the Soviets privately reprimanded Castro for recklessness, although he received praise from China. Despite their ideological affinity with China, in the Sino-Soviet split, Cuba allied with the wealthier Soviets, who offered economic and military aid.

By 1962, Cuba's economy was in steep decline, a result of poor economic management and low productivity coupled with the US trade embargo. Food shortages led to rationing, resulting in protests in Cárdenas. Security reports indicated that many Cubans associated austerity with the "Old Communists" of the PSP, while Castro considered a number of them—namely Aníbal Escalante and Blas Roca—unduly loyal to Moscow. In March 1962 Castro removed the most prominent "Old Communists" from office, labelling them "sectarian". On a personal level, Castro was increasingly lonely, and his relations with Guevara became strained as the latter became increasingly anti-Soviet and pro-Chinese.

=== Cuban Missile Crisis and furthering socialism: 1962–1968 ===
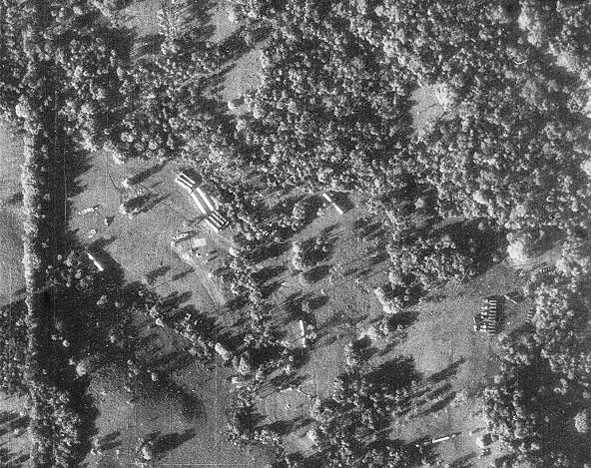
U-2 reconnaissance photograph of Soviet nuclear missiles in Cuba

Militarily weaker than NATO, Khrushchev wanted to install Soviet R-12 MRBM nuclear missiles on Cuba to even the power balance. Although conflicted, Castro agreed, believing it would guarantee Cuba's safety and enhance the cause of socialism. Undertaken in secrecy, only the Castro brothers, Guevara, Dorticós and security chief Ramiro Valdés knew the full plan. Upon discovering it through aerial reconnaissance, in October the US implemented an island-wide quarantine to search vessels headed to Cuba, sparking the Cuban Missile Crisis. The US saw the missiles as offensive; Castro insisted they were for defence only. Castro urged that Khrushchev should launch a nuclear strike on the US if Cuba were invaded, but Khrushchev was desperate to avoid nuclear war. Castro was left out of the negotiations, in which Khrushchev agreed to remove the missiles in exchange for a US commitment not to invade Cuba and an understanding that the US would remove their MRBMs from Turkey and Italy. Feeling betrayed by Khrushchev, Castro was furious and soon fell ill. Proposing a five-point plan, Castro demanded that the US end its embargo, withdraw from Guantanamo Bay Naval Base, cease supporting dissidents, and stop violating Cuban air space and territorial waters. He presented these demands to U Thant, visiting Secretary-General of the United Nations, but the US ignored them. In turn Castro refused to allow the UN's inspection team into Cuba.

In May 1963, Castro visited the USSR at Khrushchev's personal invitation, touring 14 cities, addressing a Red Square rally, and being awarded both the Order of Lenin and an honorary doctorate from Moscow State University. Castro returned to Cuba with new ideas; inspired by Soviet newspaper Pravda, he amalgamated Hoy and Revolución into a new daily, Granma, and oversaw large investment into Cuban sport that resulted in an increased international sporting reputation. Seeking to further consolidate control, in 1963 the government cracked down on Protestant sects in Cuba, with Castro labelling them counter-revolutionary "instruments of imperialism"; many preachers were found guilty of illegal US links and imprisoned. Measures were implemented to force perceived idle and delinquent youths to work, primarily through the introduction of mandatory military service. In September, the government temporarily permitted emigration for anyone other than males aged between 15 and 26, thereby ridding the government of thousands of critics, most of whom were from upper and middle-class backgrounds. In 1963, Castro's mother died. This was the last time his private life was reported in Cuba's press. In January 1964, Castro returned to Moscow, officially to sign a new five-year sugar trade agreement, but also to discuss the ramifications of the assassination of John F. Kennedy. Castro was deeply concerned by the assassination, believing that a far-right conspiracy was behind it but that the Cubans would be blamed. In October 1965, the Integrated Revolutionary Organizations was officially renamed the "Cuban Communist Party" and published the membership of its Central Committee.

Beginning in 1965, gay men were forced into the Military Units to Aid Production (Unidades Militares de Ayuda a la Producción – UMAP). However, after many revolutionary intellectuals decried this move, the UMAP camps were closed in 1967, although gay men continued to be imprisoned.

The greatest threat presented by Castro's Cuba is as an example to other Latin American states which are beset by poverty, corruption, feudalism, and plutocratic exploitation ... his influence in Latin America might be overwhelming and irresistible if, with Soviet help, he could establish in Cuba a Communist utopia.

— Walter Lippmann, Newsweek, 27 April 1964

Despite Soviet misgivings, Castro continued to call for global revolution, funding militant leftists and those engaged in national liberation struggles. Cuba's foreign policy was strongly anti-imperialist, believing that every nation should control its own natural resources. He supported Che Guevara's "Andean project", an unsuccessful plan to set up a guerrilla movement in the highlands of Bolivia, Peru and Argentina. He allowed revolutionary groups from around the world, from the Viet Cong to the Black Panthers, to train in Cuba. He considered Western-dominated Africa to be ripe for revolution and sent troops and medics to aid Ahmed Ben Bella's socialist regime in Algeria during the Sand War. He also allied with Alphonse Massamba-Débat's socialist government in Congo-Brazzaville. In 1965, Castro authorized Che Guevara to travel to Congo-Kinshasa to train revolutionaries against the Western-backed government. Castro was personally devastated when Guevara was killed by CIA-backed troops in Bolivia in October 1967 and publicly attributed it to Guevara's disregard for his own safety.

In 1966, Castro staged a Tri-Continental Conference of Africa, Asia and Latin America in Havana, further establishing himself as a significant player on the world stage. From this conference, Castro created the Latin American Solidarity Organization (OLAS), which adopted the slogan of "The duty of a revolution is to make revolution", signifying Havana's leadership of Latin America's revolutionary movement.

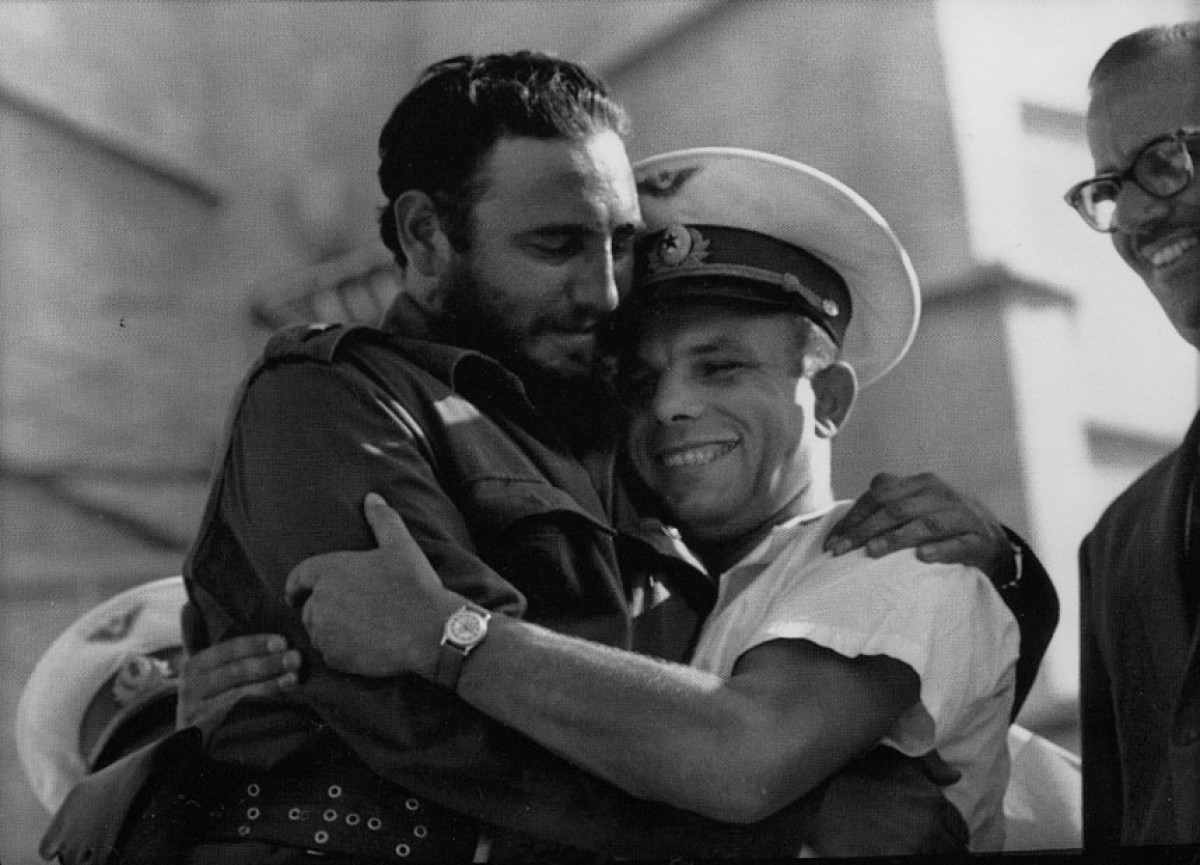
Castro and Russian cosmonaut Yuri Gagarin, the first human in space

Castro's increasing role on the world stage strained his relationship with the USSR, now under the leadership of Leonid Brezhnev. Asserting Cuba's independence, Castro refused to sign the Treaty on the Non-Proliferation of Nuclear Weapons, declaring it a Soviet-US attempt to dominate the Third World. Diverting from Soviet Marxist doctrine, he suggested that Cuban society could evolve straight to pure communism rather than gradually progress through various stages of socialism. In turn, the Soviet-loyalist Aníbal Escalante began organizing a government network of opposition to Castro, though in January 1968, he and his supporters were arrested for allegedly passing state secrets to Moscow. Recognising Cuba's economic dependence on the Soviets, Castro relented to Brezhnev's pressure to be obedient, and in August 1968 he denounced the leaders of the Prague Spring and praised the Warsaw Pact invasion of Czechoslovakia.

Influenced by China's Great Leap Forward, in 1968 Castro proclaimed a Great Revolutionary Offensive, closing all remaining privately owned shops and businesses and denouncing their owners as capitalist counterrevolutionaries. The severe lack of consumer goods for purchase led productivity to decline, as large sectors of the population felt little incentive to work hard. This was exacerbated by the perception that a revolutionary elite had emerged, consisting of those connected to the administration; they had access to better housing, private transportation, servants, and the ability to purchase luxury goods abroad.

=== Grey years and Third World politics: 1969–1974 ===
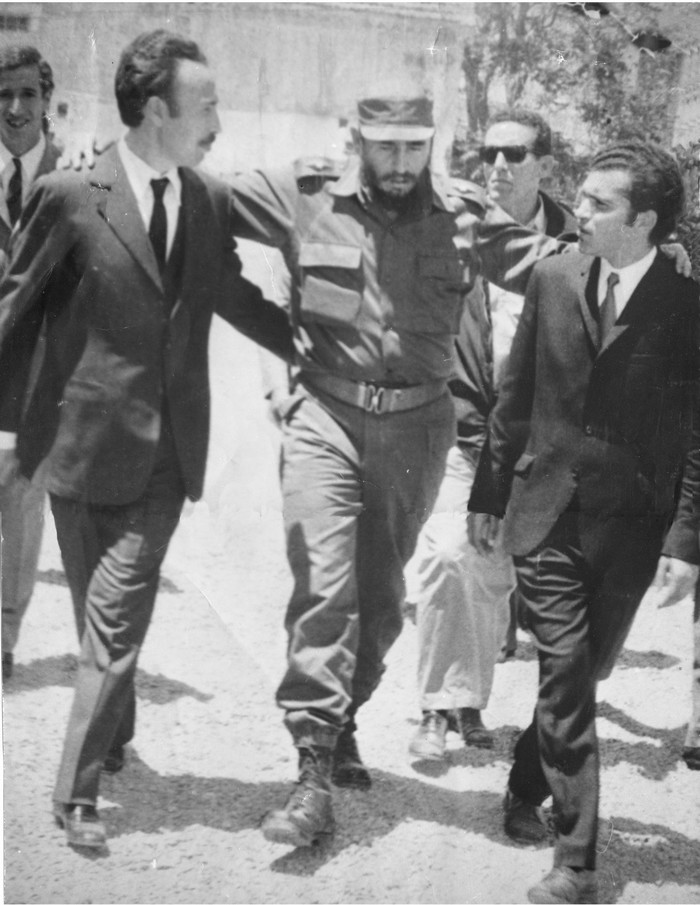
Late President of Algeria Houari Boumediene, Fidel Castro, and Benzaza Hadj Benabdallah – May 1972

Castro publicly celebrated his administration's 10th anniversary in January 1969; in his celebratory speech he warned of sugar rations, reflecting the nation's economic problems. The 1969 crop was heavily damaged by a hurricane, and to meet its export quota, the government drafted in the army, implemented a seven-day working week, and postponed public holidays to lengthen the harvest. When that year's production quota was not met, Castro offered to resign during a public speech, but assembled crowds insisted he remain. Despite the economic issues, many of Castro's social reforms were popular, with the population largely supportive of the "Achievements of the Revolution" in education, medical care, housing, and road construction, as well as the policies of "direct democratic" public consultation. Seeking Soviet help, from 1970 to 1972 Soviet economists re-organized Cuba's economy, founding the Cuban-Soviet Commission of Economic, Scientific and Technical Collaboration, while Soviet premier Alexei Kosygin visited in October 1971. In July 1972, Cuba joined the Council for Mutual Economic Assistance (Comecon), an economic organization of socialist states, although this further limited Cuba's economy to agricultural production.

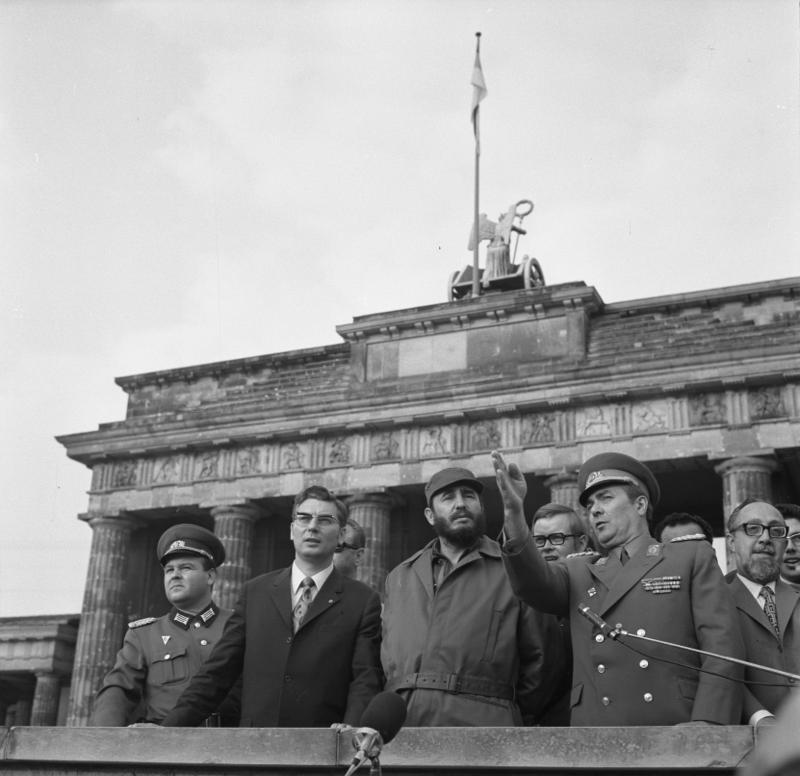
Castro and members of the East German Politburo in Berlin, June 1972

In May 1970, the crews of two Cuban fishing boats were kidnapped by Florida-based dissident group Alpha 66, who demanded that Cuba release imprisoned militants. Under US pressure, the hostages were released, and Castro welcomed them back as heroes. In April 1971, Castro was internationally condemned for ordering the arrest of dissident poet Heberto Padilla who had been arrested 20 March; Padilla was freed, but the government established the National Cultural Council to ensure that intellectuals and artists supported the administration.

In November 1971, Castro visited Chile, where Marxist President Salvador Allende had been elected as the head of a left-wing coalition. Castro supported Allende's socialist reforms but warned him of right-wing elements in Chile's military. In 1973, the military led a coup d'état and established a military junta led by Augusto Pinochet. Castro proceeded to Guinea to meet socialist President Sékou Touré, praising him as Africa's greatest leader, and there received the Order of Fidelity to the People. He then went on a seven-week tour visiting leftist allies: Algeria, Bulgaria, Hungary, Poland, East Germany, Czechoslovakia and the Soviet Union, where he was given further awards. On each trip, he was eager to visit factory and farm workers, publicly praising their governments; privately, he urged the regimes to aid revolutionary movements elsewhere, particularly those fighting the Vietnam War.

In September 1973, he returned to Algiers to attend the Fourth Summit of the Non-Aligned Movement (NAM). Various NAM members were critical of Castro's attendance, claiming that Cuba was aligned to the Warsaw Pact and therefore should not be at the conference. At the conference he publicly broke off relations with Israel, citing its government's close relationship with the US and its treatment of Palestinians during the Israel–Palestine conflict. This earned Castro respect throughout the Arab world, in particular from the Libyan leader Muammar Gaddafi, who became a friend and ally. As the Yom Kippur War broke out in October 1973 between Israel and an Arab coalition led by Egypt and Syria, Cuba sent 4,000 troops to aid Syria. Leaving Algiers, Castro visited Iraq and North Vietnam.

Cuba's economy grew in 1974 as a result of high international sugar prices and new credits with Argentina, Canada, and parts of Western Europe. A number of Latin American states called for Cuba's re-admittance into the Organization of American States (OAS), with the US finally conceding in 1975 on Henry Kissinger's advice. Cuba's government underwent a restructuring along Soviet lines, claiming that this would further democratization and decentralize power away from Castro. Officially announcing Cuba's identity as a socialist state, the first National Congress of the Cuban Communist Party was held, and a new constitution drafted that abolished the position of president and prime minister. Castro remained the dominant figure in governance, taking the presidency of the newly created Council of State and Council of Ministers, making him both head of state and head of government.

Castro considered Africa to be "the weakest link in the imperialist chain", and at the request of Agostinho Neto he ordered 230 military advisers into Angola in November 1975 to aid Neto's Marxist MPLA in the Angolan Civil War. When the US and South Africa stepped up their support of the opposition FLNA and UNITA, Castro ordered a further 18,000 troops to Angola, which played a major role in forcing a South African and UNITA retreat. The decision to intervene in Angola has been a controversial one, all the more so as Castro's critics have charged that it was not his decision at all, contending that the Soviets ordered him to do so. Castro always maintained that he took the decision to launch Operation Carlota himself in response to an appeal from Neto and that the Soviets were in fact opposed to Cuban intervention in Angola, which took place over their opposition.

Traveling to Angola, Castro celebrated with Neto, Sékou Touré and Guinea-Bissaun president Luís Cabral, where they agreed to support Mozambique's Marxist–Leninist government against RENAMO in the Mozambican Civil War. In February, Castro visited Algeria and then Libya, where he spent ten days with Gaddafi and oversaw the establishment of the Jamahariya system of governance, before attending talks with the Marxist government of South Yemen. From there he proceeded to Somalia, Tanzania, Mozambique and Angola where he was greeted by crowds as a hero for Cuba's role in opposing apartheid South Africa. Throughout much of Africa he was hailed as a friend to national liberation from foreign dominance. This was followed with visits to East Berlin and Moscow.

== Constitutional government ==
=== Institutionalization and interventions: 1976–1979 ===
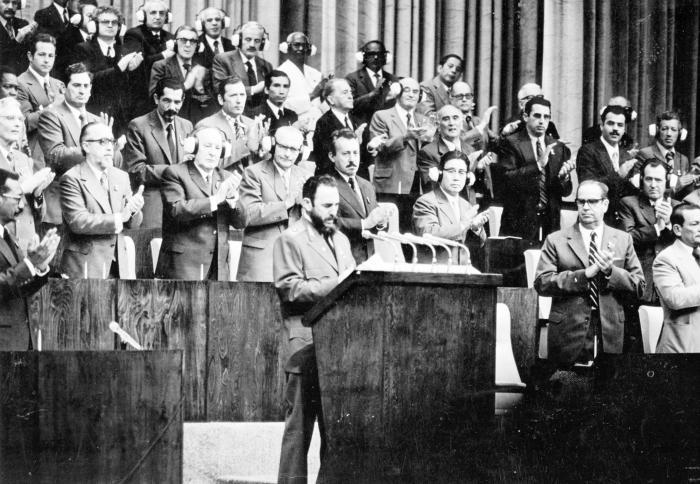
Castro speaking at the first official meeting of the Communist Party of Cuba, December 1975

Up until 1976, Cuba had been managed by a provisional government, headed by Fidel Castro, without a constitution. Cuba then adopted a new constitution in 1976, based on the 1936 Soviet Constitution. This adoption marked the end of 16 years of non-constitutional government. Up until this point, Castro had simply ruled by decree, but after the 1976 constitution, the Communist Party became the official decision-making body in Cuba. Some scholars like Peter Roman, Nino Pagliccia, and Loreen Collin have written books concluding that the system that developed after the 1976 constitution, particularly the National Assembly of People's Power, are part of a highly participatory democracy. Julio Cesar Guache offers a critical view of the "democracy" that developed, and argues it is informally controlled by the Committees for the Defense of the Revolution, who vet candidates. Samuel Farber argues that the National Assembly of People's Power is legally prohibited from political debate, and that real decision-making power lied for a long time with the Castro brothers as heads of the Communist Party of Cuba. Farber mentions that the Communist Party often passes legislation without any consideration from the National Assembly of People's Power. Fidel Castro would remain in the leadership position of First Secretary of the Communist Party of Cuba for 49 years, until stepping down in 2011.

There is often talk of human rights, but it is also necessary to talk of the rights of humanity. Why should some people walk barefoot, so that others can travel in luxurious cars? Why should some live for thirty-five years, so that others can live for seventy years? Why should some be miserably poor, so that others can be hugely rich? I speak on behalf of the children in the world who do not have a piece of bread. I speak on the behalf of the sick who have no medicine, of those whose rights to life and human dignity have been denied.

— Fidel Castro's message to the UN General Assembly, 1979

In 1977, the Ogaden War broke out over the disputed Ogaden region as Somalia invaded Ethiopia; although a former ally of Somali president Siad Barre, Castro had warned him against such action, and Cuba sided with Mengistu Haile Mariam's Marxist government of Ethiopia. In a desperate attempt to stop the war, Castro had a summit with Barre where he proposed a federation of Ethiopia, Somalia, and South Yemen as an alternative to war. Barre who saw seizing the Ogaden as the first step towards creating a greater Somalia that would unite all of the Somalis into one state rejected the federation offer and decided upon war. Castro sent troops under the command of General Arnaldo Ochoa to aid the overwhelmed Ethiopian army. Mengistu's regime was barely hanging on by 1977, having lost one-third of its army in Eritrea at the time of the Somali invasion. The intervention of 17,000 Cuban troops into the Ogaden was by all accounts decisive in altering a war that Ethiopia was on the brink of losing into a victory. After forcing back the Somalis, Mengistu then ordered the Ethiopians to suppress the Eritrean People's Liberation Front, a measure Castro refused to support.

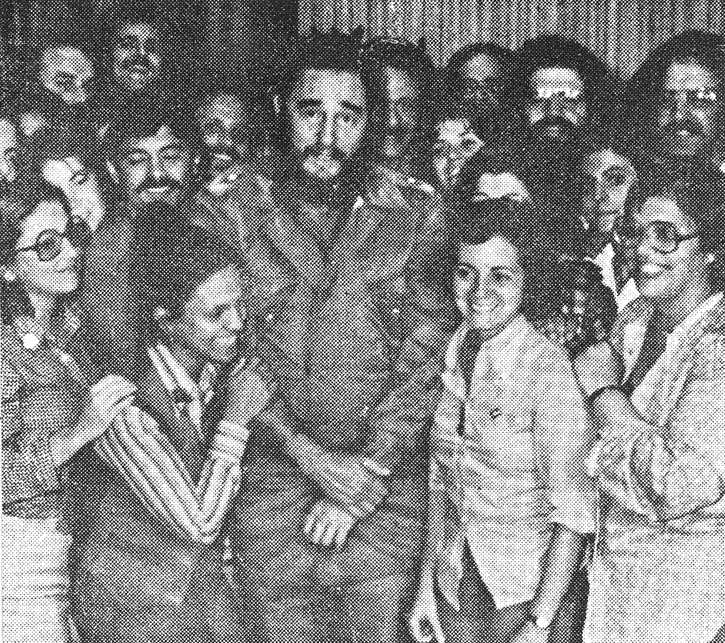
Members of the Antonio Maceo Brigade with Fidel Castro in 1978

On 22 December 1977, the Cuban exile group known as the "Antonio Maceo Brigade" took their first trip to Cuba, with the aim of cultural and political reconciliation. This visit came at the request of the Cuban government, after President Jimmy Carter briefly lifted the travel ban with Cuba. The brigade consisted of 55 Cuban exiles, who toured Cuba for two weeks. After the visit, Fidel Castro would call for dialogues with Cuban exiles abroad. These dialogues resulted in the release of political prisoners, family unifications, and relaxing of restrictions to visit Cuba.

Castro extended support to Latin American revolutionary movements, namely the Sandinista National Liberation Front in its overthrow of the Nicaraguan rightist government of Anastasio Somoza Debayle in July 1979. Castro's critics accused the government of wasting Cuban lives in these military endeavours; the anti-Castro Center for a Free Cuba has claimed that an estimated 14,000 Cubans were killed in foreign Cuban military actions. When American critics claimed that Castro had no right to interfere in these nations, he countered that Cuba had been invited into them, pointing out the US's own involvement in various foreign nations. Between 1979 and 1991 about 370,000 Cuban troops together with 50,000 Cuban civilians (mostly teachers and doctors) served in Angola, representing about 5% of Cuba's population. The Cuban intervention in Angola was envisioned as a short-term commitment, but the Angolan government used the profits from the oil industry to subsidize Cuba's economy, making Cuba as economically dependent upon Angola as Angola was militarily dependent upon Cuba.

In the late 1970s, Cuba's relations with North American states improved during the period with Mexican president Luis Echeverría, Canadian prime minister Pierre Trudeau, and US president Jimmy Carter in power. Carter continued criticizing Cuba's human rights abuses but adopted a respectful approach which gained Castro's attention. Considering Carter well-meaning and sincere, Castro freed certain political prisoners and allowed some Cuban exiles to visit relatives on the island, hoping that in turn Carter would abolish the economic embargo and stop CIA support for militant dissidents. Conversely, his relationship with China declined, as he accused Deng Xiaoping's Chinese government of betraying their revolutionary principles by initiating trade links with the US and attacking Vietnam. In 1979, the Conference of the Non-Aligned Movement (NAM) was held in Havana, where Castro was selected as NAM president, a position he held until 1982. In his capacity as both president of the NAM and of Cuba he appeared at the United Nations General Assembly in October 1979 and gave a speech on the disparity between the world's rich and poor. His speech was greeted with much applause from other world leaders, though his standing in NAM was damaged by Cuba's refusal to condemn the Soviet intervention in Afghanistan.

=== Reagan and Gorbachev: 1980–1991 ===
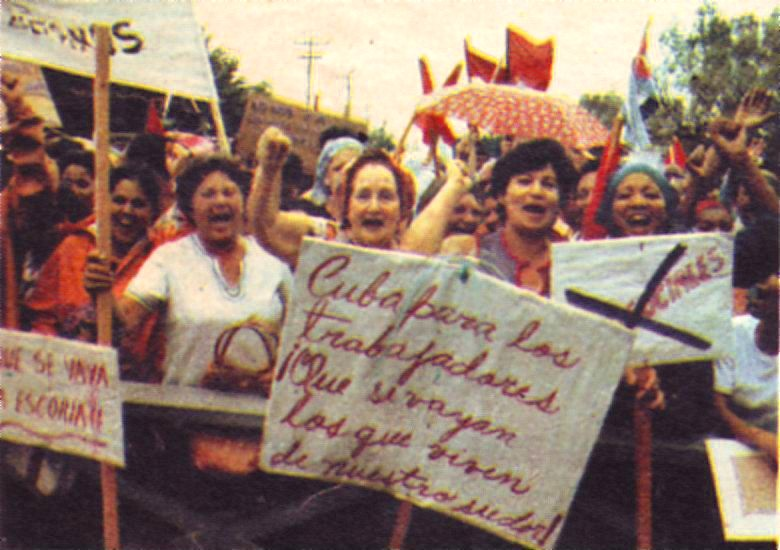
Protesters in Cuba denouncing Mariel emigrants

By the 1980s, Cuba's economy was again in trouble, following a decline in the market price of sugar and 1979's decimated harvest. For the first time, unemployment became a serious problem in Castro's Cuba, with the government sending unemployed youth to other countries, primarily East Germany, to work there. Desperate for money, Cuba's government secretly sold off paintings from national collections and illicitly traded for US electronic goods through Panama. Increasing numbers of Cubans fled to Florida but were labelled "scum" and "lumpen" by Castro and his CDR supporters. In one incident, 10,000 Cubans stormed the Peruvian Embassy requesting asylum, and so the US agreed that it would accept 3,500 refugees. Castro conceded that those who wanted to leave could do so from Mariel port. In what was known as the Mariel boatlift, hundreds of boats arrived from the US, leading to a mass exodus of 120,000; Castro's government took advantage of the situation by loading criminals, the mentally ill, and homosexuals onto the boats destined for Florida.

Reagan's administration adopted a hard-line approach against Castro, making its desire to overthrow his regime clear. In late 1981, Castro publicly accused the US of biological warfare against Cuba by orchestrating a dengue fever epidemic. Cuba's economy became even more dependent on Soviet aid, with Soviet subsidies (mainly in the form of supplies of low-cost oil and voluntarily buying Cuban sugar at inflated prices) averaging $4–5 billion a year by the late 1980s. This accounted for 30–38% of the country's entire GDP. Soviet economic assistance had not helped Cuba's long-term growth prospects by promoting diversification or sustainability. Although described as a "relatively highly developed Latin American export economy" in 1959 and the early 1960s, Cuba's basic economic structure changed very little between then and the 1980s. Tobacco products such as cigars and cigarettes were the only manufactured products among Cuba's leading exports and were produced using an expensive and labor-intensive pre-industrial process. The Cuban economy remained highly inefficient and over-specialized in a few highly subsidized commodities exported primarily to the Soviet bloc countries.

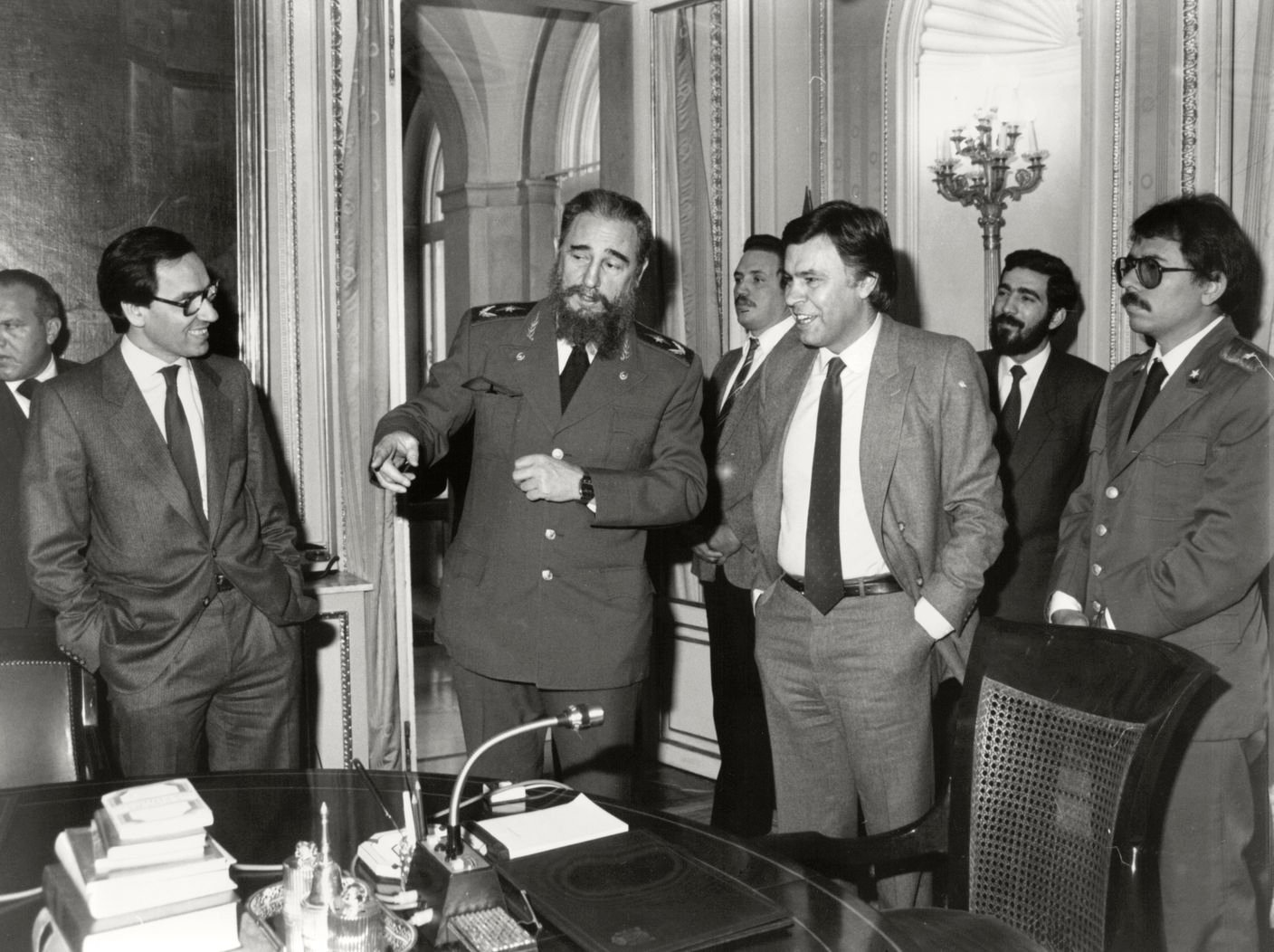
Felipe González with Fidel Castro, Daniel Ortega and Alfonso Guerra at the Moncloa Palace. Pool Moncloa. February 16, 1984.

Although despising Argentina's right-wing military junta, Castro supported them in the 1982 Falklands War against Britain and offered military aid to the Argentinians. Castro supported the leftist New Jewel Movement that seized power in Grenada in 1979, befriending Grenadine president Maurice Bishop and sending doctors, teachers, and technicians to aid the country's development. When Bishop was executed in a Soviet-backed coup by hard-line Marxist Bernard Coard in October 1983, Castro condemned the killing but cautiously retained support for Grenada's government. However, the US used the coup as a basis for invading the island. Cuban soldiers died in the conflict, with Castro denouncing the invasion and comparing the US to Nazi Germany. In a July 1983 speech marking the 30th anniversary of the Cuban Revolution, Castro condemned Reagan's administration as a "reactionary, extremist clique" who were waging an "openly warmongering and fascist foreign policy". Castro feared a US invasion of Nicaragua and sent Ochoa to train the governing Sandinistas in guerrilla warfare but received little support from the USSR.

In 1985, Mikhail Gorbachev became general secretary of the Soviet Communist Party; a reformer, he implemented measures to increase freedom of the press (glasnost) and economic decentralization (perestroika) in an attempt to strengthen socialism. Like many orthodox Marxist critics, Castro feared that the reforms would weaken the socialist state and allow capitalist elements to regain control. Gorbachev conceded to US demands to reduce support for Cuba, with Soviet-Cuban relations deteriorating. On medical advice given him in October 1985, Castro gave up regularly smoking Cuban cigars, helping to set an example for the rest of the populace. Castro became passionate in his denunciation of the Third World debt problem, arguing that the Third World would never escape the debt that First World banks and governments imposed upon it. In 1985, Havana hosted five international conferences on the world debt problem.

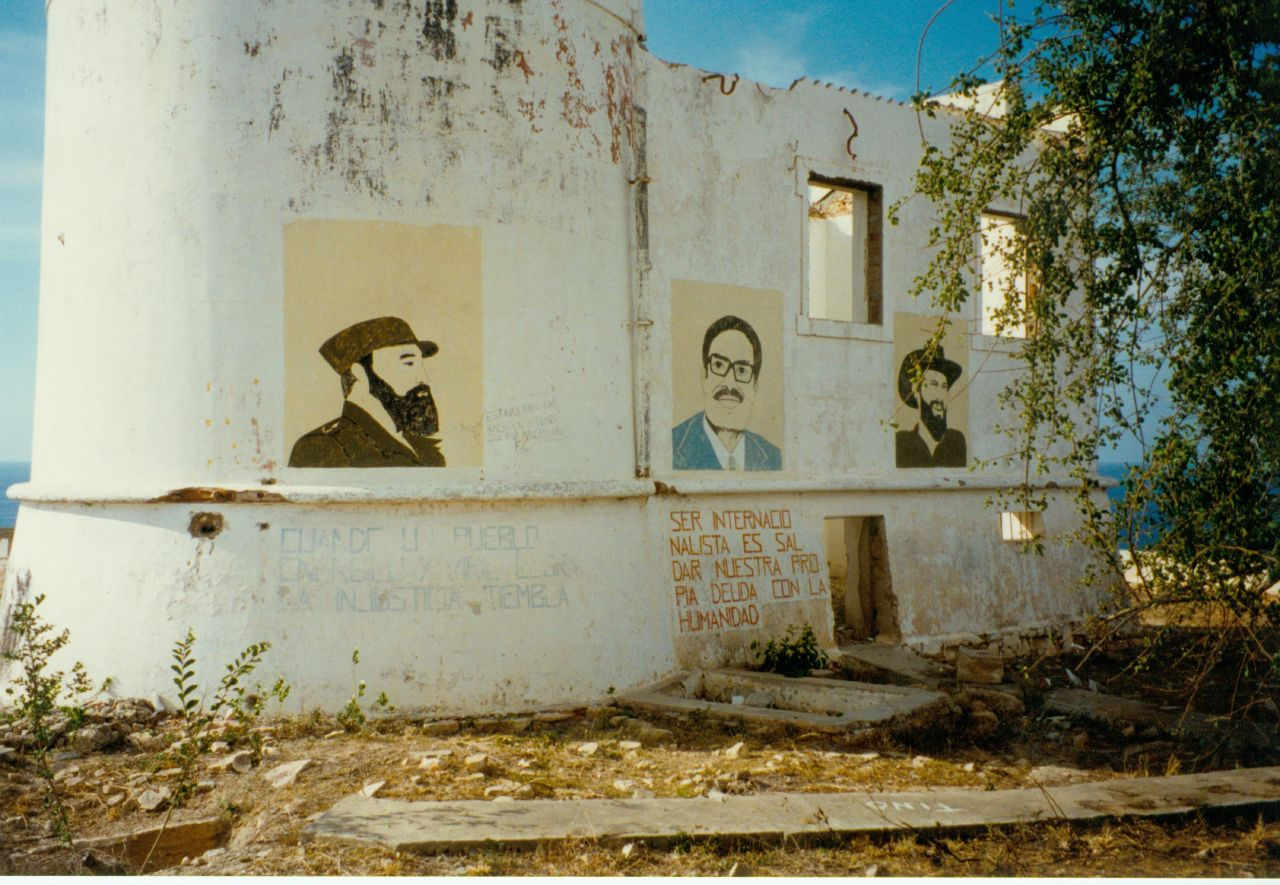
Castro's image painted onto a now-destroyed lighthouse in Lobito, Angola, 1995

By November 1987, Castro began spending more time on the Angolan Civil War, in which the Marxist MPLA government had fallen into retreat. Angolan president José Eduardo dos Santos successfully appealed for more Cuban troops, with Castro later admitting that he devoted more time to Angola than to the domestic situation, believing that a victory would lead to the collapse of apartheid. In response to the siege of Cuito Cuanavale in 1987–1988 by South African–UNITA forces, Castro sent an additional 12,000 Cuban Army troops to Angola in late 1987. From afar in Havana, Castro was closely involved in the decision-making about the defence of Cuito Cuanavle and came into conflict with Ochoa, whom he criticized for almost losing Cuito Cuanavle to a South African-UNITA assault on 13 January 1988 despite warning for almost two months prior that such an attack was coming. On 30 January 1988, Ochoa was summoned to a meeting with Castro in Havana where he was told that Cuito Cuanavale must not fall and to execute Castro's plans for a pull-back to more defensible positions over the objections of the Angolans. The Cuban troops played a decisive role in the relief of Cuito Cuanavale, breaking the siege in March 1988, which led to the withdrawal of most of the South African troops from Angola. Cuban propaganda turned the siege of Cuito Cuanavle into a decisive victory that changed the course of African history and Castro awarded 82 soldiers medals of the newly created Medal of Merit for the Defense of Cuito Cuanavle on 1 April 1988. Tensions were increased with the Cubans advancing close to the border of Namibia, which led to warnings from the South African government that they considered this an extremely unfriendly act, causing South Africa to mobilize and call up its reserves. In the spring of 1988, the intensity of South African-Cuban fighting drastically increased with both sides taking heavy losses.

The prospect of an all-out Cuban-South African war served to concentrate minds in both Moscow and Washington and led to an increased push for a diplomatic solution to the Angolan war. The cost of Cuba's wars in Africa were paid for with Soviet subsidies at a time when the Soviet economy was badly hurt by low oil prices while the apartheid government of South Africa had by the 1980s become a very awkward American ally as much of the American population, especially black Americans, objected to apartheid. From the viewpoint of both Moscow and Washington, having both Cuba and South Africa disengage in Angola was the best possible outcome. The low oil prices of the 1980s had also changed the Angolan attitude about subsidizing the Cuban economy as dos Santos found the promises made in the 1970s when oil prices were high to be a serious drain upon Angola's economy in the 1980s. South African whites were vastly outnumbered by South African blacks, and accordingly the South African Army could not take heavy losses with its white troops as that would fatally weaken the ability of the South African state to uphold apartheid. The Cubans had also taken heavy losses while the increasing difficult relations with dos Santos who become less generous in subsidizing the Cuban economy suggested that such losses were not worth the cost. Gorbachev called for a negotiated end to the conflict and in 1988 organized a quadripartite talk between the USSR, US, Cuba and South Africa; they agreed that all foreign troops would pull out of Angola while South Africa agreed to grant independence to Namibia. Castro was angered by Gorbachev's approach, believing that he was abandoning the plight of the world's poor in favour of détente.

When Gorbachev visited Cuba in April 1989, he informed Castro that perestroika meant an end to subsidies for Cuba. Ignoring calls for liberalization in accordance with the Soviet example, Castro continued to clamp down on internal dissidents and in particular kept tabs on the military, the primary threat to the government. A number of senior military officers, including Ochoa and Tony de la Guardia, were investigated for corruption and complicity in cocaine smuggling, tried, and executed in 1989, despite calls for leniency. In Eastern Europe, socialist governments fell to capitalist reformers between 1989 and 1991 and many Western observers expected the same in Cuba. Increasingly isolated, Cuba improved relations with Manuel Noriega's right-wing government in Panama—despite Castro's personal hatred of Noriega—but it was overthrown in a US invasion in December 1989. In February 1990, Castro's allies in Nicaragua, President Daniel Ortega and the Sandinistas, were defeated by the US-funded National Opposition Union in an election. With the collapse of the Soviet bloc, the US secured a majority vote for a resolution condemning Cuba's human rights violations at the United Nations Human Rights Commission in Geneva, Switzerland. Cuba asserted that this was a manifestation of US hegemony and refused to allow an investigative delegation to enter the country.

=== Special Period: 1992–2000 ===
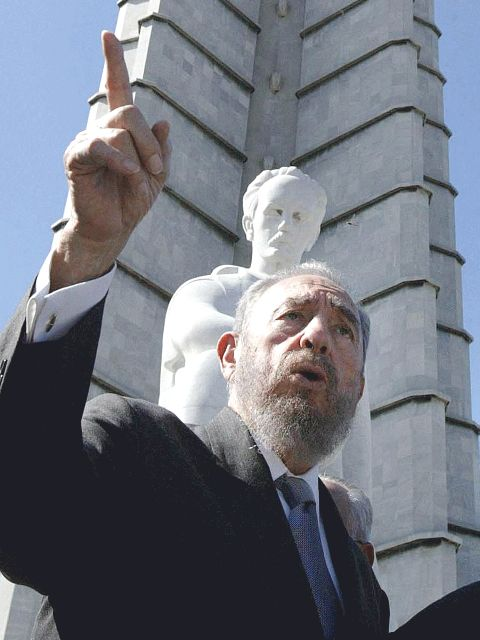
Castro in front of a Havana statue of Cuban national hero José Martí in 2003

With favourable trade from the Soviet bloc ended, Castro publicly declared that Cuba was entering a "Special Period in Time of Peace". Petrol rations were dramatically reduced, Chinese bicycles were imported to replace cars, and factories performing non-essential tasks were shut down. Oxen began to replace tractors; firewood began being used for cooking and electricity cuts were introduced that lasted 16 hours a day. Castro admitted that Cuba faced the worst situation short of open war, and that the country might have to resort to subsistence farming. By 1992, Cuba's economy had declined by over 40% in under two years, with major food shortages, widespread malnutrition and a lack of basic goods. Castro hoped for a restoration of Marxism–Leninism in the USSR but refrained from backing the 1991 coup in that country. When Gorbachev regained control, Cuba-Soviet relations deteriorated further, and Soviet troops were withdrawn in September 1991. In December, the Soviet Union was officially dissolved as Boris Yeltsin abolished the Soviet Communist Party and introducing a capitalist multiparty democracy. Yeltsin despised Castro and developed links with the Miami-based Cuban American National Foundation. Castro tried improving relations with the capitalist nations. He welcomed Western politicians and investors to Cuba, befriended Manuel Fraga and took a particular interest in Margaret Thatcher's policies in the UK, believing that Cuban socialism could learn from her emphasis on low taxation and personal initiative. He ceased support for foreign militants, refrained from praising FARC on a 1994 visit to Colombia and called for a negotiated settlement between the Zapatistas and Mexican government in 1995. Publicly, he presented himself as a moderate on the world stage.

In 1991, Havana hosted the Pan American Games, which involved construction of a stadium and accommodation for the athletes; Castro admitted that it was an expensive error, but it was a success for Cuba's government. Crowds regularly shouted "Fidel! Fidel!" in front of foreign journalists, while Cuba became the first Latin American nation to beat the US to the top of the gold-medal table. Support for Castro remained strong, and although there were small anti-government demonstrations, the Cuban opposition rejected the exile community's calls for an armed uprising. In August 1994, Havana witnessed the largest anti-Castro demonstration in Cuban history, as 200 to 300 young men threw stones at police, demanding that they be allowed to emigrate to Miami. A larger pro-Castro crowd confronted them, who were joined by Castro; he informed media that the men were anti-socials misled by the US. The protests dispersed with no recorded injuries. Fearing that dissident groups would invade, the government organized the "War of All the People" defence strategy, planning a widespread guerrilla warfare campaign, and the unemployed were given jobs building a network of bunkers and tunnels across the country.

We do not have a smidgen of capitalism or neo-liberalism. We are facing a world completely ruled by neo-liberalism and capitalism. This does not mean that we are going to surrender. It means that we have to adapt to the reality of that world. That is what we are doing, with great equanimity, without giving up our ideals, our goals. I ask you to have trust in what the government and party are doing. They are defending, to the last atom, socialist ideas, principles and goals.

— Fidel Castro explaining the reforms of the Special Period

Castro believed in the need for reform if Cuban socialism was to survive in a world now dominated by capitalist free markets. In October 1991, the Fourth Congress of the Cuban Communist Party was held in Santiago, at which a number of important changes to the government were announced. Castro would step down as head of government, to be replaced by the much younger Carlos Lage, although Castro would remain the head of the Communist Party and commander-in-chief of the armed forces. Many older members of government were to be retired and replaced by their younger counterparts. A number of economic changes were proposed, and subsequently put to a national referendum. Free farmers' markets and small-scale private enterprises would be legalized in an attempt to stimulate economic growth, while US dollars were also made legal tender. Certain restrictions on emigration were eased, allowing more discontented Cuban citizens to move to the United States. Further democratization was to be brought in by having the National Assembly's members elected directly by the people, rather than through municipal and provincial assemblies. Castro welcomed debate between proponents and opponents of the economics reforms—although over time he began to increasingly sympathise with the opponent's positions, arguing that such reforms must be delayed.

Castro's government diversified its economy into biotechnology and tourism, the latter outstripping Cuba's sugar industry as its primary source of revenue in 1995. The arrival of thousands of Mexican and Spanish tourists led to increasing numbers of Cubans turning to prostitution; officially illegal, Castro refrained from cracking down on prostitution in Cuba, fearing a political backlash. Economic hardship led many Cubans toward religion, both in the form of Catholicism and Santería. Although long thinking religious belief to be backward, Castro softened his approach to religious institutions and religious people were permitted for the first time to join the Communist Party. Although he viewed the Catholic Church as a reactionary, pro-capitalist institution, Castro organized a visit to Cuba by Pope John Paul II for January 1998; it strengthened the position of both the Cuban Church and Castro's government.

In the early 1990s Castro embraced environmentalism, campaigning against global warming and the waste of natural resources and accusing the US of being the world's primary polluter. In 1994 a ministry dedicated to the environment was established, and new laws established in 1997 that promoted awareness of environmental issues throughout Cuba and stressed the sustainable use of natural resources. By 2006, Cuba was the world's only nation which met the United Nations Development Programme's definition of sustainable development, with an ecological footprint of less than 1.8 hectares per capita and a Human Development Index of over 0.8. Castro also became a proponent of the anti-globalization movement, criticizing US global hegemony and the control exerted by multinationals. Castro maintained his strong stance against apartheid, and at the 26 July celebrations in 1991, he was joined onstage by Nelson Mandela, recently released from prison. Mandela praised Cuba's involvement in battling South Africa during the Angolan Civil War and thanked Castro personally. Castro later attended Mandela's inauguration as President of South Africa in 1994. In 2001, Castro attended the Conference Against Racism in South Africa at which he lectured on the global spread of racial stereotypes through US film.

=== Battle of Ideas: 2000–2006 ===
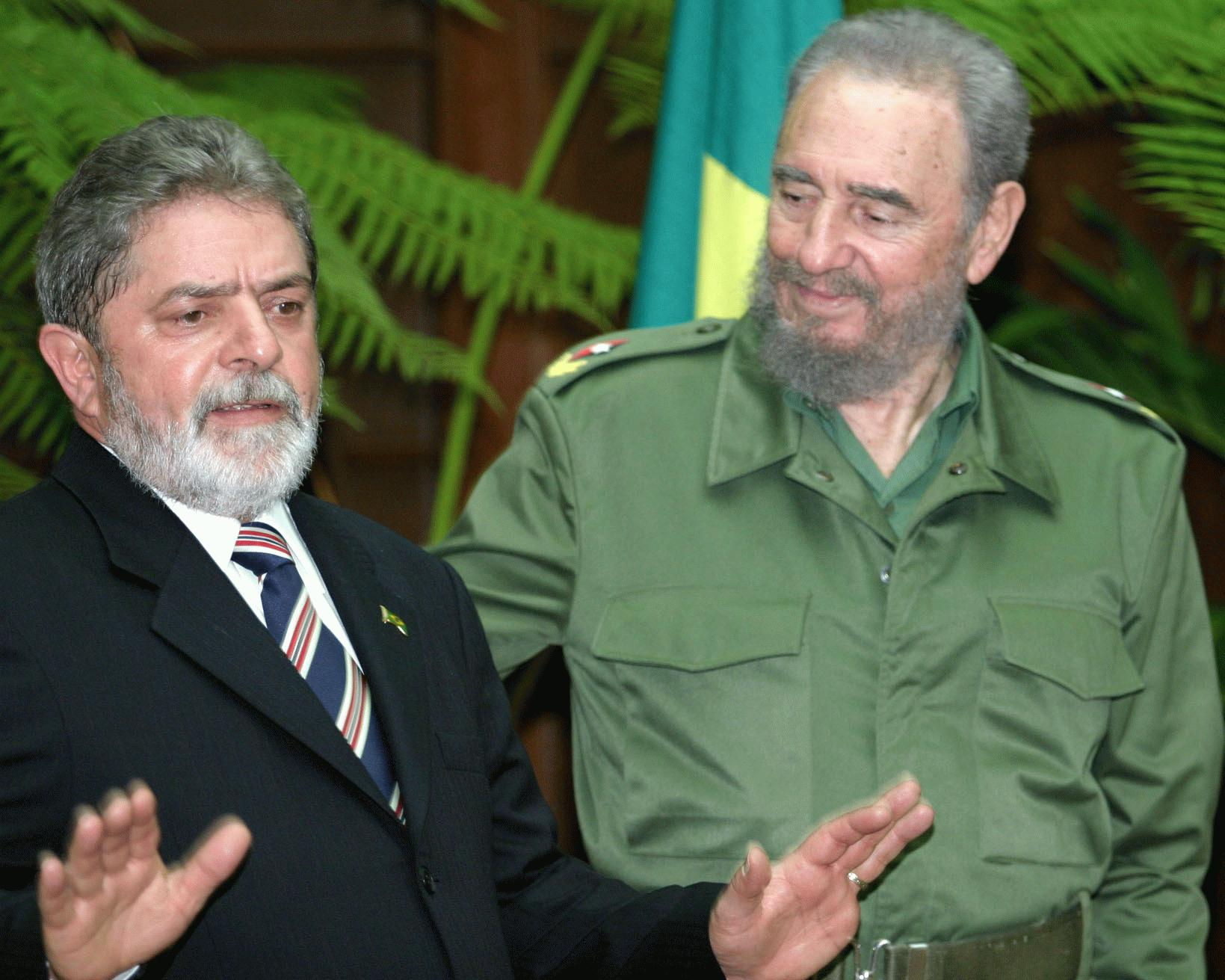
Castro (right) meeting with Brazilian president Lula da Silva (left), a significant "Pink Tide" leader

Mired in economic problems, Cuba was aided by the election of Hugo Chávez to the Venezuelan Presidency in 1999. Castro and Chávez developed a close friendship, with the former acting as a mentor and father-figure to the latter, and together they built an alliance that had repercussions throughout Latin America. In 2000, they signed an agreement through which Cuba would send 20,000 medics to Venezuela, in return receiving 53,000 barrels of oil per day at preferential rates; in 2004, this trade was stepped up, with Cuba sending 40,000 medics and Venezuela providing 90,000 barrels a day. Meanwhile, in 1998, Canadian prime minister Jean Chrétien arrived in Cuba to meet Castro and highlight their close ties. He was the first Canadian government leader to visit the island since Pierre Trudeau was in Havana in 1976.

After a spontaneous march for the return of Elián González, in December 2000, a youth group named: "Group of the Battle of Ideas", was formed by the Young Communist League and the Federation of University Students. The group began organizing demonstrations across Cuba for the return of Elián González. After González's return, the group began regularly meeting with Fidel Castro to oversee various construction projects and government meetings in Cuba. Fidel Castro ensured that the group had special authorities, and could bypass the approval of various ministries. Along with domestic projects, the wider campaign known as the "Battle of Ideas" included attempts to provide medical aid to various pink tide governments.

In 2002, former US president Jimmy Carter visited Cuba, where he highlighted the lack of civil liberties in the country and urged the government to pay attention to the Varela Project of Oswaldo Payá.

Economic problems remained in Cuba, and in 2004, Castro shut down 118 factories, including steel plants, sugar mills and paper processors to compensate for a critical shortage of fuel. In September 2005, Castro established a group of medical professionals, known as the Henry Reeve Brigade, with the mission of international medical solidarity. The group were sent throughout the world to carry out humanitarian missions on behalf of the Cuban government.

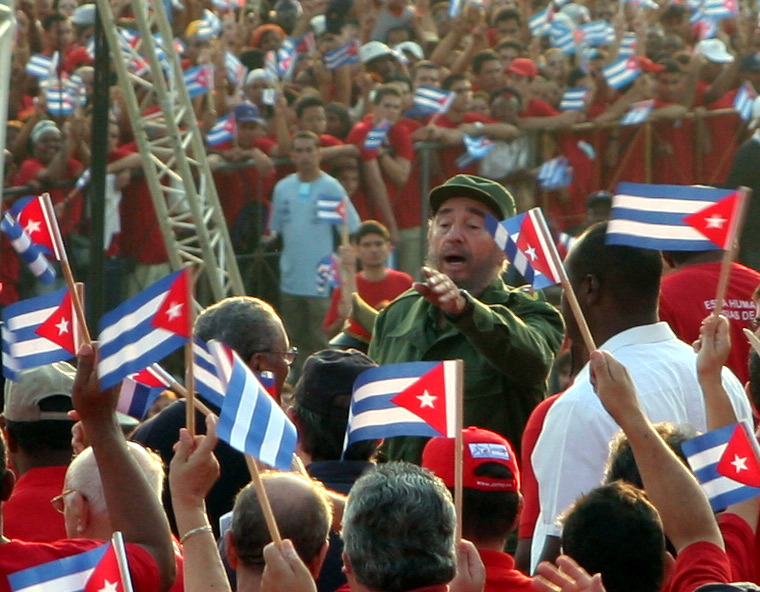
Castro amid cheering crowds in 2005

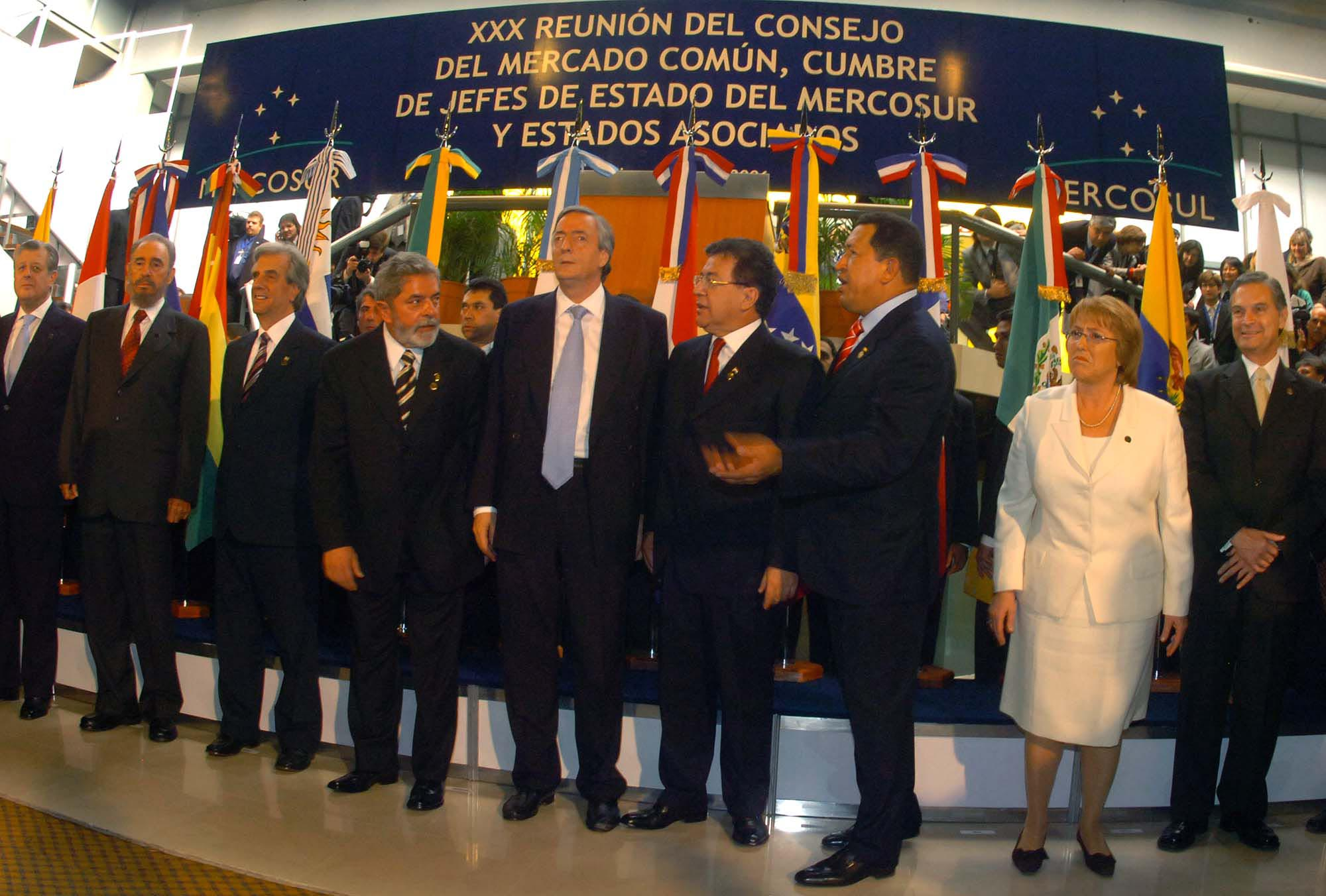
Castro (second from left) with South American leaders of the Mercosur trade bloc in 2006. In the 2000s, Castro forged alliances in the Latin American "pink tide".

Cuba and Venezuela became the founding members of the Bolivarian Alternative for the Americas (ALBA). ALBA's origins lay in a December 2004 agreement signed between the two countries and was formalized through a People's Trade Agreement also signed by Evo Morales' Bolivia in April 2006. Castro had also been calling for greater Caribbean integration since the late 1990s, saying that only strengthened cooperation between Caribbean countries would prevent their domination by rich nations in a global economy. Cuba has opened four additional embassies in the Caribbean Community including: Antigua and Barbuda, Dominica, Suriname, Saint Vincent and the Grenadines. This development makes Cuba the only country to have embassies in all independent countries of the Caribbean Community.

In contrast to the improved relations between Cuba and a number of leftist Latin American states, in 2004 it broke off diplomatic ties with Panama after centrist President Mireya Moscoso pardoned four Cuban exiles accused of attempting to assassinate Castro in 2000. Diplomatic ties were reinstalled in 2005 following the election of leftist President Martín Torrijos. Castro's improving relations across Latin America were accompanied by continuing animosity towards the US. However, after massive damage caused by Hurricane Michelle in 2001, Castro successfully proposed a one-time cash purchase of food from the US while declining its government's offer of humanitarian aid. Castro expressed solidarity with the US following the 2001 September 11 attacks, condemning Al-Qaeda and offering Cuban airports for the emergency diversion of any US planes. He recognized that the attacks would make US foreign policy more aggressive, which he believed was counterproductive. Castro criticized the 2003 invasion of Iraq, saying that the US-led war had imposed an international "law of the jungle". Castro later became a 9/11 conspiracy theorist. In 2007, he claimed that the Pentagon was not struck by American Airlines Flight 77, but by a rocket instead, asserting that no passenger remains were found, despite the bodies of those on board Flight 77 being found at the site, with DNA positively identifying them.

== Final years ==
=== Stepping down: 2006–2008 ===
Castro underwent surgery for intestinal bleeding, and on 31 July 2006, delegated his presidential duties to Raúl Castro. In February 2007, Raúl announced that Fidel's health was improving and that he was taking part in important issues of government. Later that month, Fidel called into Hugo Chávez's radio show Aló Presidente. On 21 April, Castro met Wu Guanzheng of the Chinese Communist Party's Politburo Standing Committee, with Chávez visiting in August, and Morales in September. That month, the Non-Aligned Movement held its 14th Summit in Havana, there agreeing to appoint Castro as the organization's president for a year's term.

In a February 2008 letter, Castro announced that he would not accept the positions of President of the Council of State and Commander in Chief at that month's National Assembly meetings, remarking, "It would betray my conscience to take up a responsibility that requires mobility and total devotion, that I am not in a physical condition to offer". On 24 February 2008, the National Assembly of People's Power unanimously voted Raúl as president. Describing his brother as "not substitutable", Raúl proposed that Fidel continue to be consulted on matters of great importance, a motion unanimously approved by the 597 National Assembly members.

=== Retirement: 2008–2016 ===
Following his retirement, Castro's health deteriorated; international press speculated that he had diverticulitis, but Cuba's government refused to corroborate this. He continued to interact with the Cuban people, published an opinion column titled "Reflections" in Granma, used a Twitter account, and gave occasional public lectures. In January 2009 Castro asked Cubans not to worry about his lack of recent news columns and failing health, and not to be disturbed by his future death. He continued meeting foreign leaders and dignitaries, and that month photographs were released of Castro's meeting with Argentine president Cristina Fernández.

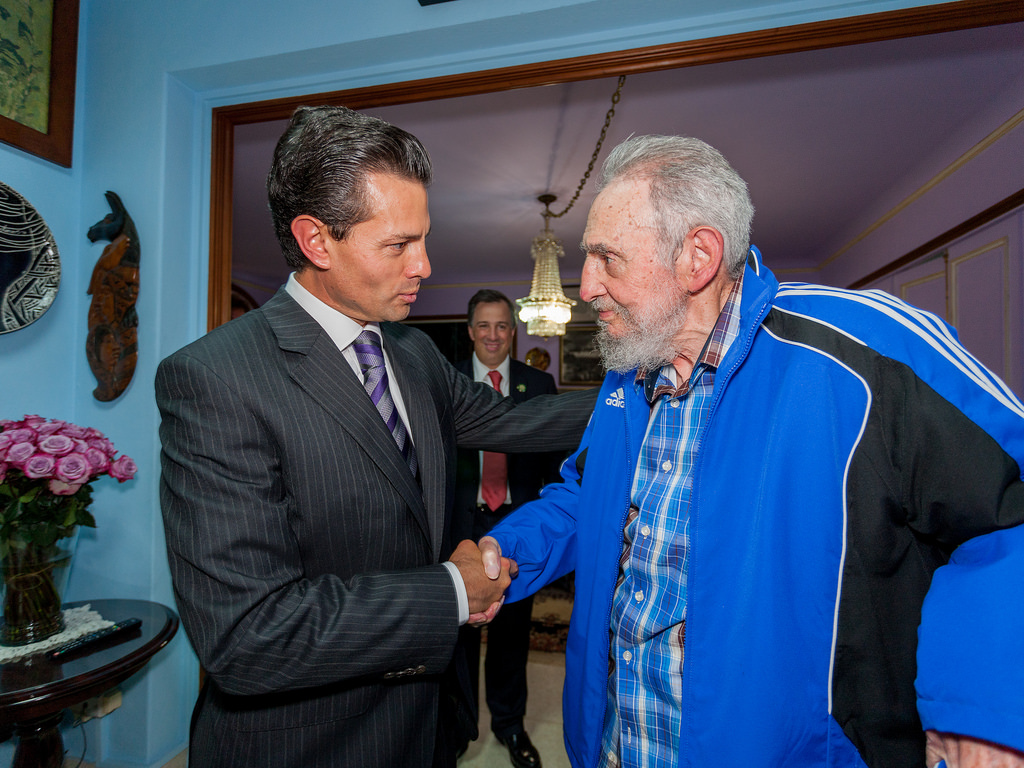
Castro with Mexican president Enrique Peña Nieto, January 2014. Even in retirement, Castro continued his involvement with politics and international affairs.

In July 2010, he made his first public appearance since falling ill, greeting science center workers and giving a television interview to Mesa Redonda in which he discussed US tensions with Iran and North Korea. On 7 August 2010, Castro gave his first speech to the National Assembly in four years, urging the US not to take military actions against those nations and warning of a nuclear holocaust. When asked whether Castro may be re-entering government, culture minister Abel Prieto told the BBC, "I think that he has always been in Cuba's political life but he is not in the government... He has been very careful about that. His big battle is international affairs." In August 2010, Castro accepted responsibility for persecuting gay men in the 1960s and 70s, which included imprisonment in forced labor camps.

On 19 April 2011, Castro resigned from the Communist Party central committee, thus stepping down as First Secretary. Raúl was selected as his successor. Now without any official role in the country's government, he took on the role of an elder statesman. In March 2011, Castro condemned the NATO-led military intervention in Libya. In late March 2012, Pope Benedict XVI visited Cuba for three days, during which time he briefly met with Castro despite the Pope's vocal opposition to Cuba's government.

Later in 2012, it was revealed that along with Hugo Chávez, Castro had played a significant behind-the-scenes role in orchestrating peace talks between the Colombian government and the far left FARC guerrilla movement to end the conflict which had raged since 1964. During the North Korea crisis of 2013, he urged both the North Korean and US governments to show restraint. Calling the situation "incredible and absurd", Castro maintained that war would not benefit either side, and that it represented "one of the gravest risks of nuclear war" since the Cuban missile crisis.

In December 2014, Castro was awarded the Chinese Confucius Peace Prize for seeking peaceful solutions to his nation's conflict with the US and for his post-retirement efforts to prevent nuclear war. In January 2015, he publicly commented on the "Cuban Thaw", an increased normalization between Cuba-US relations, by stating that while it was a positive move for establishing peace in the region, he mistrusted the US government. He did not meet with US president Barack Obama on the latter's visit to Cuba in March 2016, although sent him a letter stating that Cuba "has no need of gifts from the empire".

In April 2016, he gave his most extensive public appearance in many years when addressing the Communist Party. Highlighting that he was soon to turn 90 years old, he noted that he would die in the near future but urged those assembled to retain their communist ideals. In September 2016, Castro was visited at his Havana home by the Iranian president Hassan Rouhani, and later that month was visited by Japanese prime minister Shinzo Abe. In late October 2016, Castro met with the Portuguese president Marcelo Rebelo de Sousa, who became one of the last foreign leaders to meet him.

=== Death ===
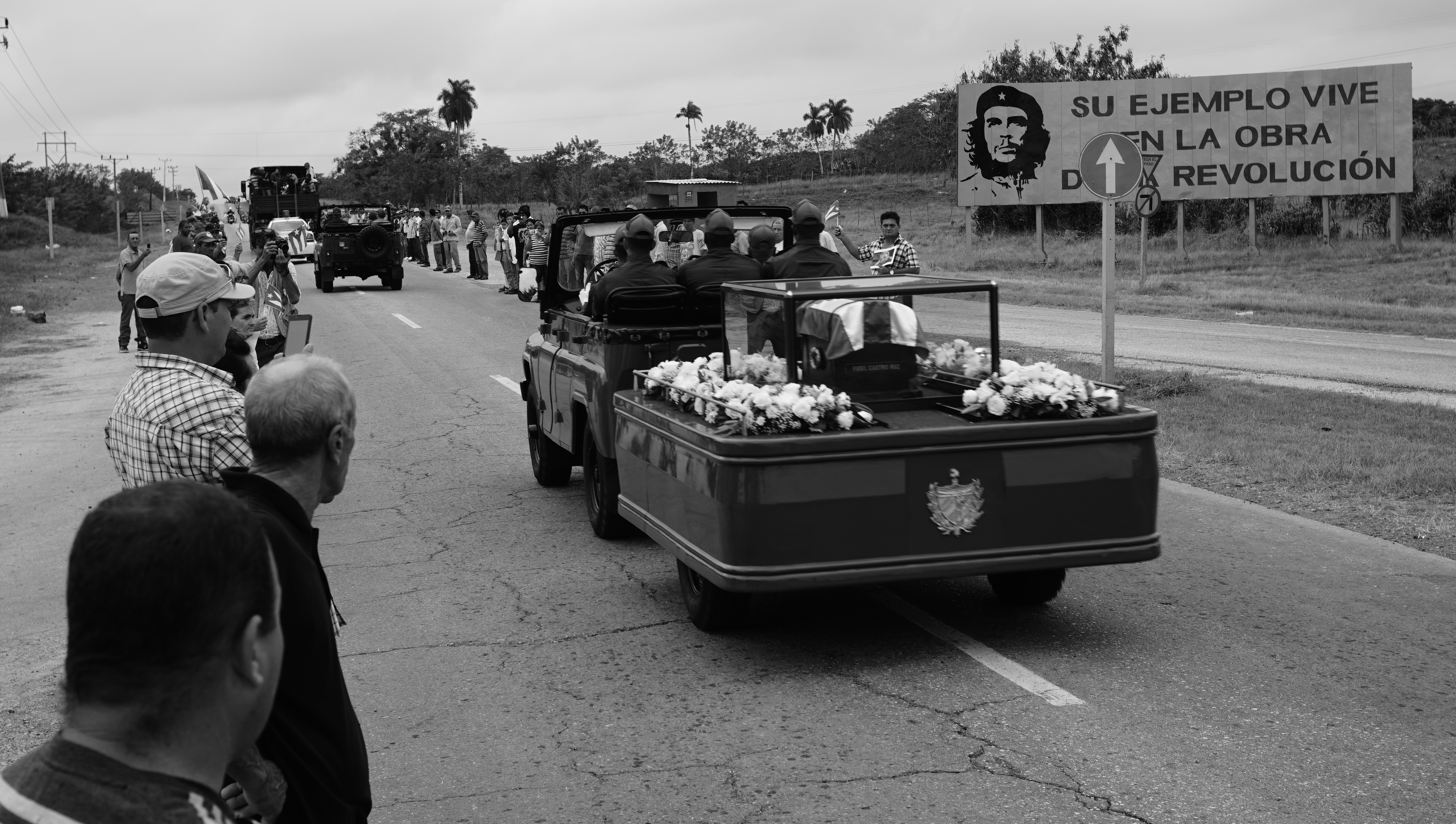
Castro's funeral procession passing through Sancti Spíritus Province, Cuba

Castro died in Havana on the night of 25 November 2016 at the age of 90. The cause of death was not disclosed.

His brother, President Raúl Castro, confirmed the news in a brief speech: "The commander in chief of the Cuban revolution died at 22:29 [EST] this evening."

Fidel Castro was cremated the next day. A funeral procession travelled 900 kilometres (560 mi) along the island's central highway from Havana to Santiago de Cuba, tracing in reverse the route of the "Freedom Caravan" of January 1959.

After nine days of public mourning, his ashes were entombed in the Santa Ifigenia Cemetery in Santiago de Cuba.

Fidel's death came nine months after his older brother Ramón died at the age of 91 in February.

== Official international visits ==
Official foreign trips by Castro were framed by the regulations on travel abroad set out in the Fundamental Law of 1959 and the 1976 Constitution of the Republic of Cuba for offices exercising executive power. Castro held those offices in different capacities: as Prime Minister of Cuba from 16 February 1959 to 2 December 1976, and as President of the Republic from 2 December 1976 to 24 February 2008.

== Ideology ==
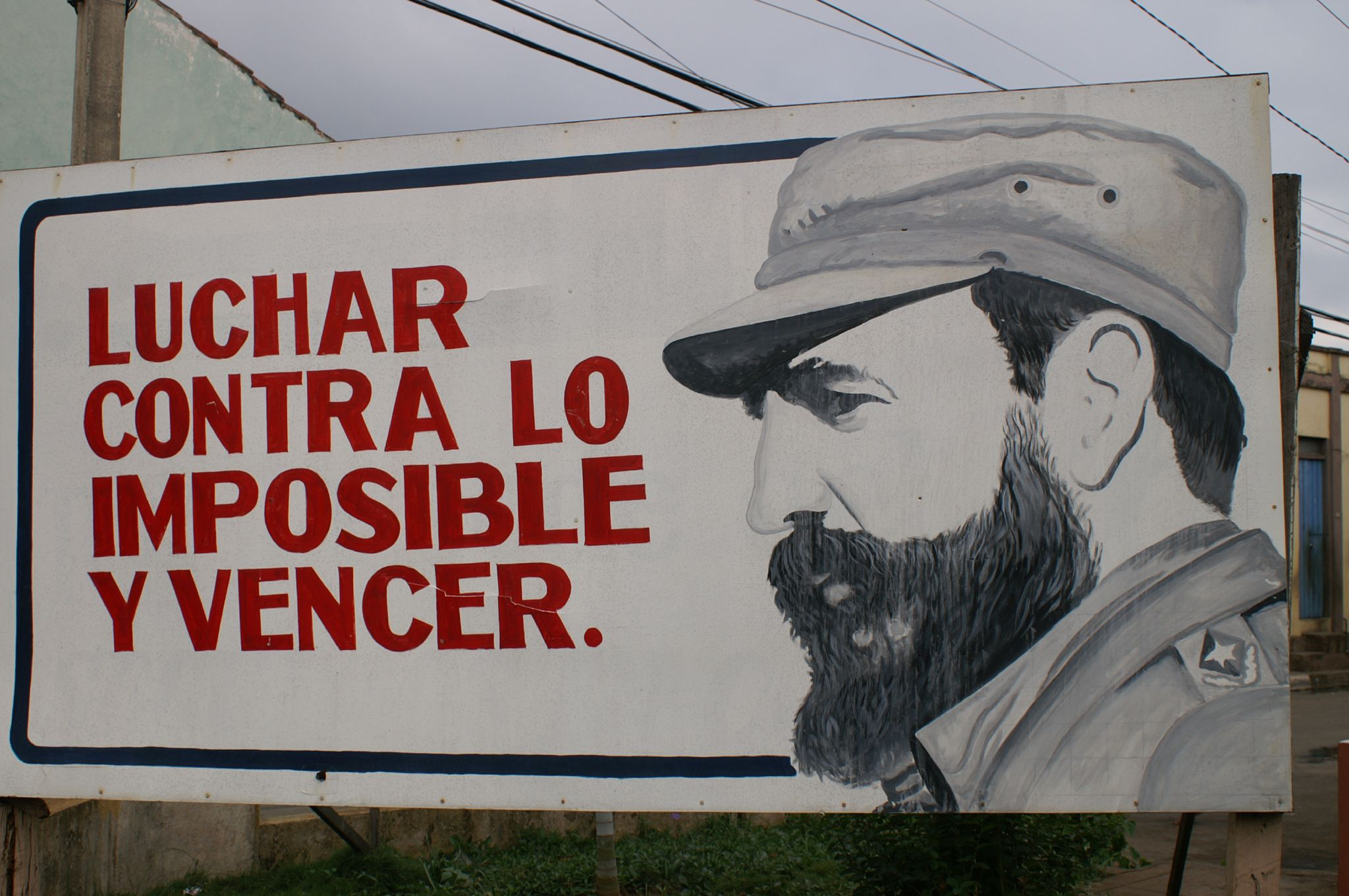
A Cuban propaganda poster proclaiming a quote from Castro: "Luchar contra lo imposible y vencer" ("To fight against the impossible and win")

Castro proclaimed himself to be "a Socialist, a Marxist, and a Leninist", and publicly identified as a Marxist–Leninist from December 1961 onward. Castro sought to transform Cuba from a capitalist state to a socialist society and ultimately to a communist society. Influenced by Guevara, he suggested that Cuba could evade most stages of socialism and progress straight to communism. According to Castro, a country could be regarded as socialist if its means of production were controlled by the state. In this way, his understanding of socialism was less about who controlled power in a country and more about the method of distribution.

Castro's government was also nationalistic and drew upon a longstanding tradition of Cuban nationalism. Historian Richard Gott remarked that one of the keys to Castro's success was his ability to use the "twin themes of socialism and nationalism" and keep them "endlessly in play". Castro described Karl Marx and Cuban nationalist José Martí as his main political influences, although Gott believed that Martí ultimately remained more important than Marx in Castro's politics. Castro also praised the Colombian Catholic revolutionary Camilo Torres Restrepo, stating that Camilo "is a symbol of the revolutionary unity which should inspire the movement of the peoples in Latin America."

Theodore Draper described Castro's approach as "Castroism", viewing it as a blend of European socialism with the Latin American revolutionary tradition. Political scientist Paul C. Sondrol described the approach as "totalitarian utopianism", with leadership that drew upon the wider Latin American phenomenon of the caudillo. Castro drew inspiration from the wider Latin American anti-imperialist movements of the 1930s and 1940s, including Argentina's Perón and Guatemala's Jacobo Árbenz. Castro took a relatively socially conservative stance on many issues, opposing drug use, gambling, and prostitution, which he viewed as moral evils. He advocated hard work, family values, integrity, and self-discipline. Although his government repressed homosexual activity for decades, he later described this persecution as a "great injustice".

== Personal life ==
=== Religious beliefs ===
Castro's religious beliefs have been a matter of some debate; he was baptized and raised as a Catholic. He criticized the use of the Bible to justify the oppression of women and Africans, but commented that Christianity exhibited "a group of very humane precepts" which gave the world "ethical values" and a "sense of social justice", relating, "If people call me Christian, not from the standpoint of religion but from the standpoint of social vision, I declare that I am a Christian." During a visit of American minister and activist Jesse Jackson, Castro accompanied him to a Methodist church service where he even spoke from the pulpit with a Bible before him, an event that marked a beginning of increased openness towards Christianity in Cuba. He promoted the idea that Jesus Christ was a communist, citing the feeding of the 5,000 and the story of Jesus and the rich young man as evidence. In 2007, US president George W. Bush said: "One day the good Lord will take Fidel Castro away." In response, Castro stated, "Now I understand why I survived Bush's plans and the plans of other presidents who ordered my assassination: the good Lord protected me."

=== Wealth ===
Forbes magazine ranked Castro as the seventh wealthiest ruler in the world at an estimated personal wealth of approximately 900 million US dollars in 2006, going from 550 million US dollars in their 2005 list. The estimate is based on the magazine's assumption that Castro had economic control over a network of state-owned companies, including CIMEX, Medicuba, the Havana Convention Palace, and the assumption that a portion of their profits went to Castro through investments. Suggesting that Castro's fortune multiplied, growing from 103 million to 850 million euros, equivalent to 900 million dollars, in just three years, the Forbes article also referred to rumours of Castro's Swiss bank accounts with "large stashes" of this fortune. According to Juan Reinaldo Sánchez, a former personal bodyguard of Castro, his assets included Cayo Piedra, a private island; over twenty mansions; a marina with yachts; encrypted bank accounts; and a gold mine. Before his death, Castro vehemently denied the magazine's claims, calling them "repugnant slander", stating that his personal net worth was nil, and that his income amounted to approximately 900 Cuban pesos (US$40) per month. The head of the Cuban Central Bank also denied the possibility of Castro accumulating such a large sum.

=== Marital history ===
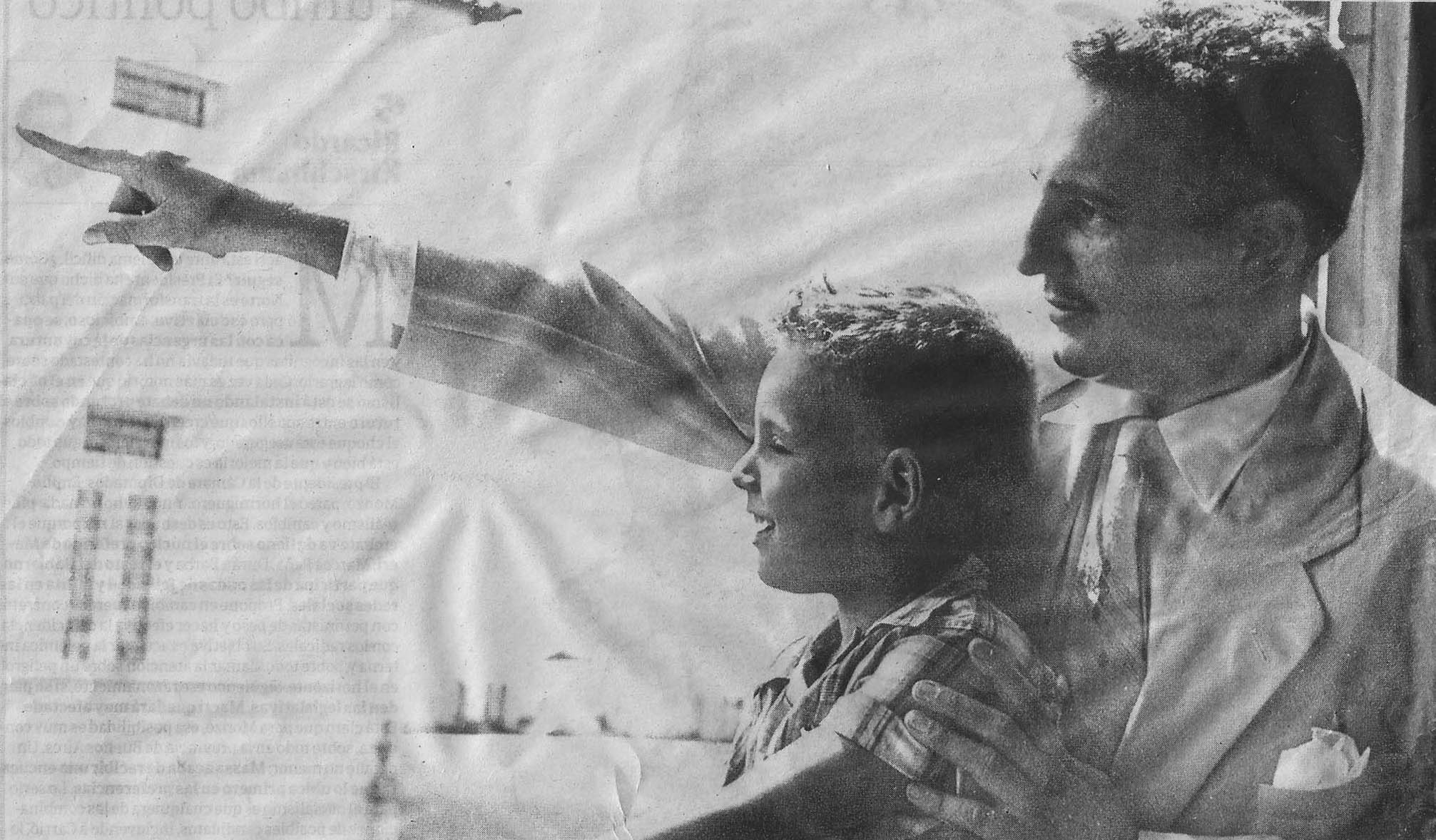
Castro with his son Ángel in 1954

The Cuban government has never published an official marital history of Castro, with most information coming from defectors and scarce details published in state media. In his earlier years in power, he showcased some of his family life, in particular his eldest son Fidelito to portray himself as a regular "family man" to the apprehensive American audience, but abandoned that as he became more concerned about his safety. Throughout his rule, Castro never named an official "First Lady" and when the need for such a public female companion was necessary, Celia Sánchez or Raúl's wife, Vilma Espín, would play such a role of la primera dama.

Castro's first wife was Mirta Díaz-Balart, whom he married in October 1948. She is the only spouse of Castro acknowledged by the Cuban Government. She was a student at the University of Havana, where she met and married Castro. She divorced him later, in 1955, while he was in prison due to the attacks on the Moncada Barracks. They had one son, Fidel Ángel "Fidelito" Castro Díaz-Balart, born in September 1949.

During his first marriage, Castro briefly encountered Maria Laborde, an admirer from Camagüey, of whom very little is known and who has long been deceased. They had one son, Jorge Ángel Castro, born on 23 March 1949. It was long believed that his birth was in 1956, but Sánchez and another defector uncovered that he was born earlier than Fidelito. This was confirmed by Alina Fernández, who claimed that Fidelito told her that Jorge Angel was "around the same age as him". While married to Mirta, Castro had an affair with Natalia "Naty" Revuelta Clews who gave birth to his daughter, Alina Fernández Revuelta, in 1956.

Castro's second and longest marriage was with Dalia Soto Del Valle, an admirer who met Castro during a speech in Villa Clara in 1961. She moved to Havana on Castro's initiative and later moved in with him at Punto Cero. Her relationship with Castro was kept secret until 2006 when she was photographed. Castro and Dalia had five sons, Alexis, Alex, Alejandro, Antonio, and Angelito. After the 1970s, Castro began a long relationship with Juanita Vera, a colonel in the foreign intelligence service who joined his escort unit as his English interpreter. She and Castro had one son, Abel Castro Vera, born in 1983.

Castro had another daughter, Francisca Pupo, born 1953, the result of a one-night affair. Pupo and her husband now live in Miami. Another son known as Ciro was born in the early 1960s, the result of another brief fling, his existence confirmed by Celia Sánchez.

Castro's family tree

== Reception and legacy ==
Within Cuba, Fidel's domination of every aspect of the government and the society remains total. His personal needs for absolute control seems to have changed little over the years. He remains committed to a disciplined society in which he is still determined to remake the Cuban national character, creating work-orientated, socially concerned individuals ... He wants to increase people's standard of living, the availability of material goods, and to import the latest technology. But the economic realities, despite rapid dramatic growth in the gross national product, severely limit what Cuba can buy on the world market.

— Peter Bourne, Castro biographer, 1986

One of the most controversial political leaders of his era, Castro inspired and dismayed people around the world during his lifetime. He ruled a single-party authoritarian regime in Cuba where political opposition was not permitted. Censorship of information was extensive, and independent journalism was repressed.

Despite its small size and limited economic weight, Castro's Cuba gained a large role in world affairs. The Castro government relied heavily on its appeals to nationalistic sentiment, in particular the widespread hostility to the US government. According to Balfour, Castro's domestic popularity stemmed from the fact that he symbolized "a long-cherished hope of national liberation and social justice" for much of the population. Balfour also noted that throughout Latin America, Castro served as "a symbol of defiance against the continued economic and cultural imperialism of the United States". Similarly, Wayne S. Smith—the former Chief of the United States Interests Section in Havana—noted that Castro's opposition to US dominance and transformation of Cuba into a significant world player resulted in him receiving "warm applause" throughout the Western Hemisphere.

Various Western governments and human rights organizations nevertheless heavily criticized Castro and he was widely reviled in the US. Following Castro's death, US president-elect Donald Trump called him a "brutal dictator", while the Cuban-American politician Marco Rubio called him "an evil, murderous dictator" who turned Cuba into "an impoverished island prison". Castro publicly rejected the "dictator" label, stating that he constitutionally held less power than most heads of state and that his government allowed for greater democratic involvement in policy making than Western liberal democracies.

Nevertheless, critics claim that Castro wielded significant unofficial influence aside from his official duties. Quirk stated that Castro wielded "absolute power" in Cuba, albeit not in a legal or constitutional manner, while Bourne claimed that power in Cuba was "completely invested" in Castro, adding that it was very rare for "a country and a people" to have been so completely dominated by "the personality of one man". Balfour stated that Castro's "moral and political hegemony" within Cuba diminished the opportunities for democratic debate and decision making. Describing Castro as a "totalitarian dictator", Sondrol suggested that in leading "a political system largely [of] his own creation and bearing his indelible stamp", Castro's leadership style warranted comparisons with totalitarian leaders like Mao Zedong, Hideki Tojo, Joseph Stalin, Adolf Hitler, and Benito Mussolini.

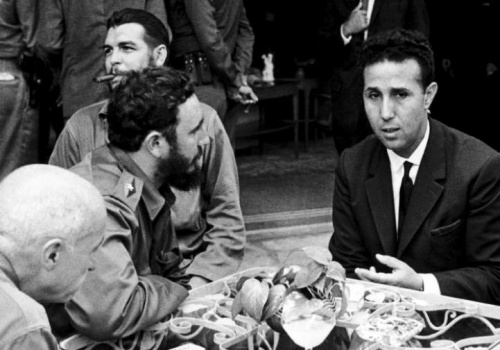
Castro with Ahmed Ben Bella, principal leader of the Algerian War of Independence against French colonial rule. Ben Bella was one of many political figures inspired by Castro.

Noting that there were "few more polarising political figures" than Castro, Amnesty International described him as "a progressive but deeply flawed leader". In their view, he should be "applauded" for his regime's "substantial improvements" to healthcare and education, but criticized for its "ruthless suppression of freedom of expression." Human Rights Watch stated that his government constructed a "repressive machinery" which deprived Cubans of their "basic rights". Castro defended his government's record on human rights, stating that the state was forced to limit the freedoms of individuals and imprison those involved in counter-revolutionary activities to protect the rights of the collective populace, such as the right to employment, education, and health care.

Historian and journalist Richard Gott considered Castro to be "one of the most extraordinary political figures of the twentieth century", commenting that he had become a "world hero in the mould" of Giuseppe Garibaldi to people throughout the developing world for his anti-imperialist efforts. Balfour stated that Castro's story had "few parallels in contemporary history", for there existed no other "Third World [sic] leader" in the second half of the twentieth century who held "such a prominent and restless part on the international stage" or remained head of state for such a long period. Bourne described Castro as "an influential world leader" who commanded "great respect" from individuals of all political ideologies across the developing world.

Canadian prime minister Justin Trudeau described Castro as a "remarkable" and "larger than life leader who served his people." The European Commission president Jean-Claude Juncker said that Castro "was a hero for many." Russian president Vladimir Putin described Castro as both "a sincere and reliable friend of Russia" and a "symbol of an era", while Chinese Communist Party general secretary Xi Jinping similarly referred to him as "a close comrade and a sincere friend" to China.

Indian prime minister Narendra Modi termed him "one of the most iconic personalities of the 20th century" and a "great friend", while South African president Jacob Zuma praised Castro for aiding black South Africans in "our struggle against apartheid". He was awarded a wide variety of awards and honours from foreign governments and was cited as an inspiration for foreign leaders like Ahmed Ben Bella and Nelson Mandela, who awarded him South Africa's highest civilian award for foreigners, the Order of Good Hope. The biographer Volker Skierka stated that "he will go down in history as one of the few revolutionaries who remained true to his principles".

== See also ==
- History of Cuba (1959–present)

== Notes ==
Party political offices
Preceded by Blas Roca Calderio	First Secretary of the Communist Party of Cuba; Incapacitated in 2006; 1961–2011	Succeeded by Raúl Castro
Political offices
Preceded by José Miró Cardona	Prime Minister of Cuba; 1959–1976	Succeeded by Himself (as President of Council of Ministers)
Preceded by Osvaldo Dorticós Torrado as President of Cuba	President of the Council of State of Cuba; Incapacitated in 2006; 1976–2008	Succeeded by Raúl Castro
Preceded by Himself as Prime Minister	President of the Council of Ministers of Cuba; Incapacitated in 2006; 1976–2008	Succeeded by Raúl Castro
Military offices
New office	Commander-in-Chief of the Revolutionary Armed Forces; Incapacitated in 2006; 1959–2008	Succeeded by Raúl Castro
Diplomatic posts
Preceded by Junius Richard Jayewardene	Secretary-General of the Non-Aligned Movement; 1979–1983	Succeeded by Zail Singh
Preceded by Abdullah Ahmad Badawi	Secretary-General of the Non-Aligned Movement; Incapacitated in 2006; 2006–2008	Succeeded by Raúl Castro
