= 3rd Central Committee of the Communist Party of Cuba =

Government body elected in 1986

The 3rd Central Committee of the Communist Party of Cuba (CPC) was elected at the 3rd CPC Congress in 1986.

== Members ==
Name	2nd CC	4th CC	Gender
Jose Abrantes Fernández	Old	Not	Male
Rogelio Acevedo Gonzalez	Old	Reelected	Male
Armando Acosta Cordero	Old	Not	Male
Jose M. Acosta Santana	New	Not	Male
Severo Aguirre del Cristo	Old	Not	Male
Carlos Aldana Escalante	Old	Reelected	Male
Nieves A. Alemany Aguilera	New	Not	Male
Roberto Damian Alfonso Gonzalez	Alt.	Not	Male
Juan Almeida Bosque	Old	Reelected	Male
Rodrigo Alvarez Cambras	Alt.	Reelected	Male
Luis Alvarez de la Nuez	Old	Reelected	Male
Abelardo Alvarez Gil	New	Reelected	Male
Emilio Aragones Navarro	Old	Not	Male
Jose Ramon Balaguer Cabrera	Old	Reelected	Male
Argelia Balboa Monzon	Alt.	Not	Female
German Barreiro Carames	Old	Not	Male
Sixto Batista Santana	Old	Reelected	Male
Faustino Beato Morejon	New	Not	Male
Joaquin L. Benavides Rodriguez	Alt.	Not	Male
Jesus Bermudez Cutino	Old	Reelected	Male
Joaquin Bernal Camero	Alt.	Not	Male
Urbelino S. Betancourt Cruces	Alt.	Reelected	Male
Flavio Bravo Pardo	Old	Not	Male
Francisco R. Caballero Casanova	Old	Not	Male
Julio Camacho Aguilera	Old	Reelected	Male
Miguel J. Cano Blanco	Old	Not	Male
Dora Carcano Araujo	Old	Not	Female
Tomas V. Cardenas Garcia	New	Reelected	Male
Jose Felipe Carneado Rodriguez	Old	Reelected	Male
Julio Casas Regueiro	Old	Reelected	Male
Senen Casas Regueiro	Old	Reelected	Male
Fidel Castro Ruz	Old	Reelected	Male
Raul Castro Ruz	Old	Reelected	Male
Osmany Cienfuegos Gorriaran	Old	Reelected	Male
Leopoldo Cintra Frias	Old	Reelected	Male
Abelardo Colome Ibarra	Old	Reelected	Male
Xiomara Contreras Piedra	New	Not	Female
Sergio Corrieri Hernandez	New	Reelected	Male
Homero Crabb Valdes	New	Reelected	Male
Jaime Crombet Hernandez-Baquero	Old	Reelected	Male
Francisco J. J. M. Cruz Bourzac	Alt.	Not	Male
Pedro M. Chavez Gonzalez	New	Reelected	Male
Faure Chomon Mediavilla	Old	Reelected	Male
Asela de los Santos Tamayo	Old	Not	Female
Sergio del Valle Jimenez	Old	Reelected	Male
Joel Domenech Benitez	Old	Not	Male
Luis Orlando Dominguez Muniz	Old	Not	Male
Fabian Escalante Font	Alt.	Not	Male
Juan Escalona Reguera	Old	Not	Male
Vilma Espin Guillois	Old	Reelected	Female
Ramon Espinosa Martin	Old	Not	Male
Antonio Esquivel Yedra	Old	Not	Male
Jose Ramon Fernandez Alvarez	Old	Reelected	Male
Eddy Fernandez Boada	Alt.	Not	Male
Pedro Fernandez Diaz	Old	Not	Male
Carlos Fernandez Gondin	Old	Reelected	Male
Oscar Fernandez Mell	Old	Not	Male
Rosario Fernandez Perera	Old	Not	Male
Elcira Fernandez Torres	Alt.	Not	Female
Yolanda Ferrer Gomez	Old	Reelected	Female
Gustavo Fleitas Ramirez	Old	Not	Male
Rigoberto Garcia Fernandez	Old	Reelected	Male
Guillermo Garcia Frias	Old	Reelected	Male
Santos Godoy Hernandez	Alt.	Not	Male
Ismael Gonzalez Gonzales	New	Not	Male
Jose Gonzalez Torres	Alt.	Reelected	Male
Fabio Grobart	Old	Not	Male
Nicolas Guillen Batisa	New	Not	Male
Armando Hart Davalos	Old	Reelected	Male
Melba E. Hernandez Rodriguez del Rey	New	Reelected	Female
Alfredo Hondal Gonzalez	Alt.	Reelected	Male
Omar H. Iser Mojena	Old	Not	Male
Alfredo Jordan Morales	New	Reelected	Male
Carlos Lage Davila	Alt.	Reelected	Male
Juan Esteban Lazo Hernandez	Alt.	Reelected	Male
Juana T. Leyva Torres	Old	Not	Female
Jorge Lezcano Perez	Old	Reelected	Male
Francisco Linares Calvo	Alt.	Reelected	Male
Jose de J. Linares Valdes	Old	Not	Male
Nestor Lopez Cuba	Old	Reelected	Male
Manuel Lopez Lopez	New	Not	Male
Jose A. Lopez Moreno	Old	Not	Male
Rogelio Lopez Sotolongo	New	Not	Male
Jose Loyola Fernandez	New	Not	Male
Orlando Lugo Fonte	Alt.	Reelected	Male
Jose Ramon Machado Ventura	Old	Reelected	Male
Isidore Malmierca Peoli	Old	Reelected	Male
Armado Manresa Gonzalez	Alt.	Not	Male
Tania J. Manzanares Ayala	New	Reelected	Female
Pascual Martinez Gil	Old	Not	Male
Angel L. Mena Kindelan	New	Not	Male
Jorge Enrique Mendoza Reboredo	Old	Reelected	Male
Raul E. Menendez Tomassevich	Old	Not	Male
Raul Michel Vargas	Alt.	Reelected	Male
Humberto M. Miguel Fernandez	Old	Not	Male
Pedro Miret Prieto	Old	Not	Male
Jose M. Miyar Barruecos	Old	Not	Male
Jesus Montane Oropesa	Old	Reelected	Male
Alfredo Morales Cartaya	New	Reelected	Male
Angel Moreno Bofill	New	Not	Male
Jose A. Naranjo Morales	Old	Reelected	Male
Arnaldo Tomas Ochoa Sanchez	Old	Not	Male
Rene Penalver Valdes	Old	Not	Male
Humberto Perez Gonzalez	Old	Not	Male
Faustino Perez Hernandez	Old	Reelected	Male
Antonio Perez Herrero	Old	Not	Male
Manuel Pineiro Losada	Old	Reelected	Male
Marcos J. Portal Leon	Alt.	Reelected	Male
Rodolfo Puente Ferro	Alt.	Not	Male
Joaquin Quintas Solas	Old	Not	Male
Jose Ramirez Cruz	Old	Not	Male
Fidel Ramos Perera	Alt.	Reelected	Male
Maria C. Reyes Fernandez	New	Not	Female
Jorge Risquet Valdes-Saldana	Old	Reelected	Male
Julian Rizo Alvarez	Old	Reelected	Male
Roberto Robaina Gonzalez	New	Reelected	Male
Gladys N. Robinson Agramonte	New	Reelected	Female
Blas Roca Calderio	Old	Not	Male
Pedro M. Roche Alvarez	Old	Not	Male
Sonia Rodriguez Cardona	Alt.	Not	Female
Rene Rodriguez Cruz	Old	Not	Male
Luis Rodriguez Hernandez	Alt.	Not	Male
Hector Rodriguez Llompart	Old	Reelected	Male
Antonio Rodriguez Maurell	New	Reelected	Male
Carlos Rafael Rodriguez Rodriguez	Old	Reelected	Male
Ulises Rosales del Toro	Old	Reelected	Male
Pedro Ross Leal	Alt.	Reelected	Male
Victor E. Schueg Colas	Alt.	Not	Male
Rosa Elena Simeón de Negrín	Old	Reelected	Female
Arnaldo Socarras Miranda	New	Not	Male
Lionel Soto Prieto	Old	Reelected	Male
Julio Tejas Perez	Alt.	Not	Male
Diocles Torralbas Gonzalez	New	Not	Male
Casimira Torres Jauma	Alt.	Not	Female
Julio Trujillo Aguero	Alt.	Not	Male
Ramiro Valdes Menendez	Old	Reelected	Male
Jorge Valdes Rodriguez	Old	Reelected	Male
Raul Valdes Vivo	Old	Not	Male
Adolfo J. Valdivia Dominguez	Old	Not	Male
Elida Valle Fernandez	Old	Not	Female
Lazaro Vazquez Garcia	Alt.	Not	Male
Fernando Vecino Alegret	Old	Reelected	Male
Roberto Veiga Menendez	Old	Not	Male
Margarita de la C. Veliz Rios	New	Not	Female
Noel Z. Zubiaur Mir	New	Not	Male

=== Alternates ===
Name	2nd CC	4th CC	Gender
Ricardo Alarcon de Quesada	Old	Member	Male
Julian Alvarez Blanco	New	Member	Male
Ramon Andollo Valdes	New	Member	Male
Felix Baranda Columbie	Old	Member	Male
Martha M. Bosch Diaz	New	Not	Female
Raul Castellanos Lage	New	Member	Male
Pastor Castell-Florit Serrate	New	Not	Male
Barbara Castillo Cuesta	New	Member	Female
Marcia Cobas Ruiz	New	Not	Female
Magda Cortina Licea	New	Not	Female
Dora Cosme Diaz	Old	Not	Female
Eugenio Cuevas Ibanez	New	Member	Male
Adolfo A. Diaz Suarez	New	Not	Male
Omar Dinza Despaigne	New	Not	Male
Ana L. Exposito Rodriguez	New	Not	Female
Augusto Fajardo Pi	New	Not	Male
Eladio J. Fernandez Civico	New	Member	Male
Manuel Fernandez Crespo	New	Not	Male
Orlando Freyre Rivero	New	Not	Male
Nidian Frometa Matos	New	Not	Female
Maria de los A. Garcia Alvarez	New	Member	Female
Oscar de J. Garcia Cabrera	New	Not	Male
Francisco Garcia Ferrer	New	Member	Male
Elda Garcia Garcia	New	Not	Female
Jose R. Garcia Gil	New	Not	Male
Mirtha E. Garcia Llorca	New	Not	Female
Yadira E. Garcia Vera	New	Member	Female
Jose A. Gell Noa	New	Not	Male
Raul F. Gomez Cabrera	New	Not	Male
Olga R. Gomez Cortes	New	Not	Female
Evidio Gomez Gonzalez	New	Not	Male
Velia Gonzalez Abreu	New	Not	Male
Luis Gonzalez Acosta	New	Not	Male
Iran Gonzalez Perez	New	Member	Male
Addegunde E. Gonzalez Rivas	New	Not	Male
Carmen Gutierrez Cepero	New	Member	Female
Arnaldo Jerez Santiesteban	New	Not	Male
Reinaldo Larduet Despaigne	New	Not	Male
Victorino Lemus Rivero	New	Member	Male
Mario R. Leon Miguez	New	Not	Male
Carlos M. Lezcano Perez	Old	Not	Male
Manuel de J. Limonta Vidal	New	Not	Male
Silvano Linares Viltres	New	Not	Male
Julian C. Lopez Diaz	Old	Not	Male
Alvaro V. Lopez Miera	Old	Member	Male
Mercedes F. Llano Montane	New	Not	Female
Jorge Matos Bello	New	Not	Male
Coralia Mazar Antunez	New	Not	Female
Gustavo M. Milian Rivero	New	Not	Male
Rafael Moracen Limonta	New	Not	Male
Ermelinda Morales Lopez	New	Not	Female
Margarita de la Sena Navarrete Navarro	New	Not	Female
Tomas A. Oviedo Hormaza	New	Not	Male
Fidel Parra Santoya	New	Not	Male
Natividad Pedroso Kirkwood	New	Not	Male
Pedro Miguel A. Perez Betancourt	New	Member	Male
Manuel S. Perez Hernandez	New	Not	Male
Sergio Perez Lezcano	New	Not	Male
Emilio Pimienta Veloz	New	Not	Male
Vicente Pineda Vasallo	New	Not	Male
Juan C. Robinson Agramonte	New	Not	Male
Alejandro Francisco Roca Iglesias	New	Member	Male
Samuel Carlos Rodiles Planas	Old	Member	Male
Mirtha R. Rodriguez Alfonso	New	Not	Female
Julio B. Rodriguez Curbelo	New	Not	Male
Adolfo A. Rodriguez Nodals	New	Member	Male
Alejandro Ronda Marrero	New	Not	Male
Jose A. Ruiz Campos	New	Not	Male
Eduardo Sanchez Alberro	New	Not	Male
Manuel Sarmiento Sotelo	New	Not	Male
Jaime Smith Pridde	New	Not	Male
Milagros K. Soto Aguero	New	Not	Male
Romarico V. Sotomayor Garcia	New	Member	Male
Maria L. Suarez Campos	New	Not	Female
Arnaldo Tamayo Mendez	Old	Not	Male
Osvaldo Umpierrez Suarez	New	Not	Male
Jose A. Verdecia Ramirez	New	Not	Male
Manuel Vila Cruz	New	Not	Male
