= 2nd Central Committee of the Communist Party of Cuba =

Government body elected in 1980

The 2nd Central Committee of the Communist Party of Cuba (CPC) was elected at the 2nd CPC Congress on the 20th December 1980. It composed of 146 members, 132 male, 15 female. 2 members died before the 3rd CPC Congress, being Osvaldo Dorticos Torrado, who died of suicide on the 23th of June 1983 and Arnaldo Milián Castro who died of natural causes in 1983.

== Members ==
Name	1st CC	3rd CC	Gender
Jose Abrantes Fernández	Old	Reelected	Male
Rogelio Acevedo González	Old	Reelected	Male
Armando Acosta Cordero	Old	Reelected	Male
Severo Aguirre del Cristo	Old	Reelected	Male
Carlos Aldana Escalante	New	Reelected	Male
Juan Almeida Bosque	Old	Reelected	Male
José Maria Alvarez Bravo	Old	Not	Male
Luis Alvarez de la Nuez	New	Reelected	Male
Dimaris Aquino Diaz	New	Not	Male
Emilio Aragonés Navarro	Old	Reelected	Male
Maria Julia Arredondo O'Reilly	Alt.	Not	Male
José Antonio Arteaga Hernández	Old	Not	Male
José Ramón Balaguer Cabrera	Old	Reelected	Male
Evarlsto Baranda Pascual	New	Not	Male
German Barreiro Carames	New	Reelected	Male
Sixto Batista Santana	Old	Reelected	Male
Zoila Benitez de Mendoza	New	Not	Female
Jesús Bermúdez Cutiño	New	Reelected	Male
Flavio Bravo Pardo	Old	Reelected	Male
Clara Cabrera Calderon	New	Not	Female
Julio E. Camacho Aguilera	Old	Reelected	Male
Miguel José Cano Blanco	Old	Reelected	Male
Andrés Carballosa Peña	New	Not	Male
Dora Carcano Araujo	Alt.	Reelected	Female
Ramon Cardona Nuevo	New	Not	Male
José Felipe Carneado Rodríguez	Old	Reelected	Male
Lino Carreras Rodríguez	Old	Not	Male
Julio Casas Regueiro	Old	Reelected	Male
Senén Casas Regueiro	Old	Reelected	Male
Fidel Castro Ruz	Old	Reelected	Male
Raul Castro Ruz	Old	Reelected	Male
Reinaldo Castro Yedra	Old	Not	Male
Faure Chomón Mediavilla	Old	Reelected	Male
Osmany Cienfuegos Gorriarán	Old	Reelected	Male
Leopoldo Cintra Frías	Old	Reelected	Male
Abelardo Colomé Ibarra	Old	Reelected	Male
Jaime Crombet Hernández-Baquero	Old	Reelected	Male
Ixart Cuenca Mastrapa	New	Not	Male
Gloria Cueto Rodriguez	New	Not	Female
Raul Curbelo Morales	Old	Not	Male
Nelia Delfin Ripoll	New	Not	Female
Luis Felipe Denis Díaz	New	Not	Male
Manuel Díaz González	Old	Not	Male
Joel Domenech Benítez	Old	Reelected	Male
Luis Orlando Domínguez Muñiz	Old	Reelected	Male
Osvaldo Dorticos Torrado	Old	Died	Male
Félix Duque Güelmes	New	Not	Male
Juan Escalona Reguera	New	Reelected	Male
Vilma Lucila Espín Guillois	Old	Reelected	Female
Ramon Espinosa Martin	Old	Reelected	Male
Antonio Esquivel Yedra	Old	Reelected	Male
Carlos Fernandez Gondin	Old	Reelected	Male
Electra Fernández López	Alt.	Not	Female
José Ramón Fernández Alvarez	Old	Reelected	Male
Oscar Fernández Mell	Old	Reelected	Male
Pedro Fernandez Diaz	New	Reelected	Male
Rosario Fernández Perera	Alt.	Reelected	Male
Serafín Fernández Rodríguez	Alt.	Not	Male
Harold Ferrer Martínez	Old	Not	Male
María Yolanda Ferrer Gómez	New	Reelected	Female
Gustavo Fleitas Ramirez	New	Reelected	Male
Ibelices Gala Valiente	New	Not	Male
Guillermo Garcia Frias	Old	Reelected	Male
Julio Alfredo García Olivera	Old	Not	Male
Nemesio Garcia Sanchez	New	Not	Male
Pedro M. García Peláez	Old	Not	Male
Raúl García Pelaéz	Old	Not	Male
Rigoberto García Fernández	Old	Reelected	Male
Eladio Ladislao González Carvajal	Old	Not	Male
Francisco Gonzalez Lopez	New	Not	Male
Fabio Grobart	Old	Reelected	Male
Pedro Güelmes González	New	Not	Male
Secundino Guerra Hidalgo	Old	Not	Male
Nicolás Cristóbal Guillén Batista	Old	Reelected	Male
Marcos Antonio Gutierrez Bello	New	Not	Male
Armando Hart Dávalos	Old	Reelected	Male
Alfonso Roberto Hodge Farguharson	Old	Not	Male
Omar H. Iser Mojena	Old	Reelected	Male
Isabel Jomarron Gonzalez	New	Not	Female
Rolando Kindelán Bles	Old	Not	Male
Rene Lara Moreno	New	Not	Male
Antonio Leon del Monte	New	Not	Male
Raul Eugenio Leon Torras	New	Not	Male
Georgina Leyva Pagan	New	Not	Female
Jorge Lezcano Pérez	Old	Reelected	Male
José de Jesús Linares Valdés	New	Reelected	Male
José A. Lopez Moreno	New	Reelected	Male
Nestor Lopez Cuba	New	Reelected	Male
Orlando Lorenzo Castro	New	Not	Male
Jose Ramon Machado Ventura	Old	Reelected	Male
Isidoro Octavia Malmierca Peoli	New	Reelected	Male
Isaac Luis Martell Rosas	New	Not	Male
Pascual Martinez Gil	New	Reelected	Male
Braulio Maza Oliva	New	Not	Male
José Joaquín Méndez Cominches	Old	Not	Male
Jorge Enrique Mendoza Reboredo	Old	Reelected	Male
Raúl Menéndez Tomassevich	Old	Reelected	Male
Humberto Miguel Fernandez	New	Reelected	Male
Arnaldo Milián Castro	Old	Died	Male
Pedro Miret Prieto	Old	Reelected	Male
José M. Miyar Barruecos	New	Reelected	Male
Jesús Montané Oropesa	Old	Reelected	Male
Angel Rosendo Moreno Bofill	New	Reelected	Male
José Alberto Naranjo Morales	Old	Reelected	Male
Arnaldo Tomás Ochoa Sánchez	Old	Reelected	Male
Filiberto Olivera Moya	Old	Not	Male
Esperanza Ortiz Garcia	New	Not	Female
Ramón Pardo Guerra	Old	Not	Male
Rene Penalver Valdes	New	Reelected	Male
Antonio Pérez Herrero	Old	Reelected	Male
Faustino Pérez Hernández	Old	Reelected	Male
Humberto Pérez González	Old	Reelected	Male
Manuel Piñeiro Losada	Old	Reelected	Male
Delsa Esther Puebla Viltre	New	Not	Female
Joaquin Quintas Sola	New	Reelected	Male
José Ramírez Cruz	Old	Reelected	Male
Jorge Risquet Valdés-Saldaña	Old	Reelected	Male
Julián Rizo Alvarez	Old	Reelected	Male
Raúl Roa García	Old	Not	Male
Blas Roca Calderío	Old	Reelected	Male
Pedro Manuel Roche Alvarez	New	Reelected	Male
Carlos Rafael Rodríguez Rodríguez	Old	Reelected	Male
Héctor Rodríguez Llompart	Old	Reelected	Male
Orlando Rodríguez Puerta	Old	Not	Male
Rene Rodriguez Cruz	New	Reelected	Male
Ursinio Rojas Santiesteban	Old	Not	Male
Ulises Rosales del Toro	Old	Reelected	Male
Aldo Santamaría Cuadrado	Old	Not	Male
René de los Santos Ponce	Old	Reelected	Male
Asela de los Santos Tamayo	Old	Reelected	Female
Armando Saucedo Yero	New	Not	Male
Rosa Elena Simeón Negrín	New	Reelected	Female
Lionel Soto Prieto	Old	Reelected	Male
Alfredo Suarez Quintela	New	Not	Male
Diocles Torralba González	Old	Reelected	Male
Jorge Torres Hernandez	New	Not	Male
Wilfredo Torres Iribar	New	Not	Male
Ramiro Valdes Menendez	Old	Reelected	Male
Jorge Valdes Rodriguez	New	Reelected	Male
Rafael Valdes Valdes	New	Not	Male
Raúl Valdés Vivó	Old	Reelected	Male
Adolfo Juan Valdivia Dominguez	New	Reelected	Male
Elida Valle Fernandez	New	Reelected	Female
Sergio del Valle Jimenez	Old	Reelected	Male
Fernando Vecino Alegret	Old	Reelected	Male
Roberto Veiga Menéndez	Old	Reelected	Male
Luis Alfonso Zayas Ochoa	Old	Not	Male
Noel Zubiaur Mir	New	Reelected	Male

=== Alternates ===
Name	1st CC	3rd CC	Gender
Enrique Acevedo Gonzalez	New	Not	Male
Ricardo Alárcon de Quesada	New	Alt.	Male
Roberto Damian Alfonso Gonzalez	New	Member	Male
Rodrigo Alvarez Cambras	New	Member	Male
Rene Anillo Capote	New	Not	Male
Carlos Arocha Perez	New	Not	Male
Argelia Balboa Monzon	New	Member	Female
Félix Baranda Columbié	New	Alt.	Male
Ladislao Baranda Columbie	New	Not	Male
Joaquin Benavides Rodriguez	New	Member	Male
Guillermo Benitez Barbosa	New	Not	Male
Joaquín Bernal Camero	Alt.	Member	Male
Urbelino Betancourt Cruces	New	Member	Male
Thelma Bornot Pubillones	Alt.	Not	Female
Francisco Cabrera González	Alt.	Member	Male
Eladio Calvo Gonzalez	New	Not	Male
Julio Castro Palomino	New	Member	Male
Manuel Cespedes Fernandez	New	Not	Male
Maria Emilia Chapman Roche	New	Not	Female
Juan Luis Charon Duarte	New	Not	Male
Sergio Corrleri Hernandez	New	Member	Male
Dora Cosme Diaz	New	Alt.	Female
Francisco Cruz Bourzac	New	Member	Male
José L. Cuza Téllez-Giron	Alt.	Not	Male
Maximo Diaz Rodriguez	New	Not	Male
Fabian Escalante Font	New	Member	Male
Raimundo Espinosa Aguilera	New	Not	Male
Eddy Fernandez Boada	New	Member	Male
Elcira Fernandez Torres	New	Member	Female
Orlando Fundora Lopez	New	Not	Male
Santos Godoy Hernandez	New	Member	Male
Gonzalo Gonzalez de la Rosa	New	Not	Male
Jose Gonzalez Torres	New	Member	Male
Julio Cesar Gonzalez Gonzalez	New	Not	Male
Alfredo Hondal Gonzalez	New	Member	Male
Carlos Lage Davila	New	Member	Male
Juan Esteban Lazo Hernández	New	Member	Male
Juan Jose Leon Vega	New	Not	Male
Andres Leyva Castro	New	Not	Male
Juana Teresa Leyva Torres	New	Member	Female
Carlos Lezcano Perez	New	Alt.	Male
Francisco Linares Calvo	New	Member	Male
Alvaro Lopez Miera	New	Alt.	Male
Julian Lopez Diaz	New	Member	Male
Orlando Lugo Fonte	New	Member	Male
Armando Manresa Gonzalez	New	Member	Male
Angel Mariano Martir Carrion	New	Not	Male
Luis Matheu Delgado	New	Not	Male
Cecilia Menendez Llanes	New	Not	Female
Raul Michel Vargas	New	Member	Male
Edmundo Miranda Mora	New	Not	Male
Iraldo Mora Orozco	New	Not	Male
Antonio Nunez Jimenez	New	Not	Male
Jose Luis Padron Gonzalez	New	Not	Male
Romello Perez Leon	New	Not	Male
Marcos J. Portal Leon	New	Member	Male
Rodolfo Puente Ferro	New	Member	Male
Oscar Puig Cespedes	New	Not	Male
Pedro Ramon Pupo Perez	New	Not	Male
Fidel Ramos Perera	New	Member	Male
Josefina Rebellon Alonso	New	Not	Female
Samuel Carlos Rodiles Planas	New	Alt.	Male
Luis Rodriguez Hernandez	New	Member	Male
Raul Rodriguez Lopez	New	Not	Male
Sonia Rodriguez Cordova	New	Member	Female
Pedro Ross Leal	New	Member	Male
Irma Sanchez Valdes	New	Not	Female
Manuel Santana Ona	New	Not	Male
Victor Schueg Colas	New	Member	Male
Arnaldo Tamayo Mendez	New	Alt.	Male
Julio Tejas Perez	New	Member	Male
Casimira Torres Jauma	New	Member	Female
Julio Trujillo Aguero	New	Member	Male
Lazaro Vazquez Garcia	New	Member	Male
Felix Veliz Hernandez	New	Not	Male
Jesus Ramon Vila Fernandez	New	Not	Male
Vicente Zumeta Diaz	New	Not	Male
