= 1st Central Committee of the Communist Party of Cuba =

Government body elected in 1975

The 1st Central Committee of the Communist Party of Cuba (CPC) was elected at the 1st CPC Congress in 1975.

== Apparatus ==
1. Organization Department
2. Military Department
3. Economic Department
4. General Affairs Department
5. Department of Science, Education and Culture
6. General Department on Foreign Affairs
7. Department on Revolutionary Orientation
8. Department on Basic Industry
9. Agricultural-Livestock Department
10. Construction Department
11. Communications and Transportation Department
12. Department for the Sugar Sector
13. Consumer Goods and Domestic Commerce Department
14. Department in Charge of the Formation of Cadres
15. America Department
16. Department for State and Judicial Organs
17. Mass Organizations Department
18. Party Control and Revision Commission

== Members ==
Name	PRO CC	2nd CC	Gender
José Abrantes Fernández	Old	Reelected	Male
Armando Acosta Cordero	Old	Reelected	Male
Rogelio Acevedo González	Old	Reelected	Male
Severo Aguirre del Cristo	Old	Reelected	Male
Juan Almeida Bosque	Old	Reelected	Male
José Maria Alvarez Bravo	Old	Reelected	Male
Emilio Aragonés Navarro	Old	Reelected	Male
José Antonio Arteaga Hernández	Old	Reelected	Male
José Ramón Balaguer Cabrera	New	Reelected	Male
Sixto Batista Santana	New	Reelected	Male
Flavio Bravo Pardo	Old	Reelected	Male
Julio E. Camocho Aguilera	Old	Reelected	Male
Miguel José Cano Blanco	New	Reelected	Male
José Felipe Carneado Rodríguez	New	Reelected	Male
Lino Carreras Rodríguez	Old	Reelected	Male
Belarmino Castilla Mas	Old	Not	Male
Fidel Castro Ruz	Old	Reelected	Male
Raúl Castro Ruz	Old	Reelected	Male
Reinaldo Castro Yedra	New	Reelected	Male
Joel Chaveco Hernández	Old	Not	Male
Faure Chomón Mediavilla	New	Reelected	Male
Osmany Cienfuegos Gorriarán	Old	Reelected	Male
Leopoldo Cintra Frías	Old	Reelected	Male
Abelardo Colomé Ibarra	Old	Reelected	Male
Senén Casas Regueiro	Old	Reelected	Male
Raúl Curbelo Morales	Old	Reelected	Male
Manuel Díaz González	Old	Reelected	Male
Joel Domenech Benítez	Old	Reelected	Male
Luis Orlando Domínguez Muñiz	New	Reelected	Male
Osvaldo Dorticós Torrado	Old	Reelected	Male
Vilma Lucila Espín Guillois	Old	Reelected	Female
José Ramón Fernández Alvarez	New	Reelected	Male
Pilar Fernández Alvarez	Old	Not	Male
Abárcelo Fernández Font	Old	Not	Male
Oscar Fernández Mell	Old	Reelected	Male
Harold Ferrer Martínez	Old	Reelected	Male
Rafael Francia Mestre	Old	Not	Male
Rigoberto García Fernández	New	Reelected	Male
Guillermo García Frías	Old	Reelected	Male
Calixto García Martínez	Old	Not	Male
Julio Alfredo García Olivera	Old	Reelected	Male
Pedro M. García Peláez	Old	Reelected	Male
Raúl García Pelaéz	Old	Reelected	Male
Elena Gil Izquierdo	Old	Not	Female
Eladio Ladislao González Carvajal	New	Reelected	Male
Fabio Grobart	Old	Reelected	Male
Pedro Guelmes González	Old	Reelected	Male
Raúl Guerra Bermejo	Old	Not	Male
Secundino Guerra Hidalgo	Old	Reelected	Male
Nicolás Cristóbal Guillén Batista	New	Reelected	Male
Armando Hart Dávalos	Old	Reelected	Male
Jaime Crombet Hernández Baquero	New	Reelected	Male
Alfonso Roberto Hodge Farguharson	New	Reelected	Male
Omar H. Iser Mojena	Old	Reelected	Male
Reinerio Jiménez Lage	Old	Not	Male
Rolando Kindelán Bles	Old	Reelected	Male
Jorge Lezcano Pérez	New	Reelected	Male
Emilio Loo Hernández	Old	Not	Male
César Lora Reselló	Old	Not	Male
Antonio Enrique Lussón Batlle	Old	Not	Male
José Ramón Machado Ventura	Old	Reelected	Male
Juan Marinello Vidaurreta	Old	Not	Male
Zoilo Marinello Vidaurreta	Old	Not	Male
Facundo Martínez Villant	Old	Not	Male
José Joaquín Méndez Cominches	Old	Reelected	Male
Jorge Enrique Mendoza Reboredo	New	Reelected	Male
Alfredo Menéndez Cruz	Old	Not	Male
Raúl Menéndez Tomassevich	Old	Not	Male
Arnaldo Milián Castro	Old	Reelected	Male
Pedro Miret Prieto	Old	Reelected	Male
Jesús Montané Oropesa	Old	Reelected	Male
José Alberto Naranjo Morales	Old	Reelected	Male
Arnaldo Tomás Ochoa Sánchez	Old	Reelected	Male
Mario Oliva Pérez	Old	Not	Male
Filiberto Olivera Moya	Old	Reelected	Male
Arturo Once González	Old	Not	Male
Ramón Pardo Guerra	Old	Reelected	Male
Humberto Pérez González	New	Reelected	Male
Faustino Pérez Hernández	Old	Reelected	Male
Antonio Pérez Herrero	Old	Reelected	Male
Manuel Piñeiro Losada	Old	Reelected	Male
Carlos Pis Delgado	Old	Not	Male
José Ramírez Cruz	Old	Reelected	Male
Julián Rizo Alvarez	New	Reelected	Male
Raúl Roa García	Old	Reelected	Male
Blas Roca Calderío	Old	Reelected	Male
Héctor Rodríguez Llompart	New	Reelected	Male
Pedro Rodríguez Peralta	Old	Not	Male
Orlando Rodríguez Puerta	Old	Reelected	Male
Carlos Rafael Rodríguez Rodríguez	Old	Reelected	Male
Ursinio Rojas Santiesteban	Old	Reelected	Male
Ulises Rosales del Toro	New	Reelected	Male
Irving Ruiz Brito	Old	Not	Male
Celia Sánchez Manduley	Old	Not	Female
Aldo Santamaría Cuadrado	Old	Reelected	Male
Haydée Santamaría Cuadrado	Old	Not	Female
René de los Santos Ponce	Old	Reelected	Male
Asela de los Santos Tamayo	New	Reelected	Female
José R. Silva Berroa	Old	Not	Male
Lionel Soto Prieto	Old	Reelected	Male
Diocles Torralba González	Old	Reelected	Male
Felipe Torres Trujillo	Old	Not	Male
Ramiro Valdés Menéndez	Old	Reelected	Male
Raúl Valdés Vivó	New	Reelected	Male
Jorge Risquet Valdés-Saldaña	Old	Reelected	Male
Sergio del Valle Jiménez	Old	Reelected	Male
Fernando Vecino Alegret	New	Reelected	Male
Roberto Veiga Menéndez	New	Reelected	Male
Aníbal Velaz Suárez	Old	Not	Male
Roberto Viera Estrada	Old	Not	Male
Luis Alfonso Zayas Ochoa	Old	Reelected	Male

=== Alternates ===
Name	PRO CC	2nd CC	Gender
Maria Julia Arredondo O'Reilly	New	Member	Female
Joaquín Bernal Camero	New	Alt.	Male
Thelma Bornot Pubillones	New	Alt.	Female
Francisco Cabrera González	New	Alt.	Male
Julio Casas Regueiro	New	Member	Male
Dora Coreano Araujo	New	Member	Female
José L. Cuza Téllez-Giron	New	Alt.	Male
Electra Fernández López	New	Member	Female
Rosario Fernández Perera	New	Member	Male
Serafín Fernández Rodríguez	New	Member	Male
José A. Gutiérrez Muñiz	New	Not	Male
Francisco Pérez Olivera	New	Not	Male
Diocles Torralba González	New	Promoted	Male
Felipe Torres Trujillo	New	Promoted	Male
