= 5th Central Committee of the Communist Party of Cuba =

The 5th Central Committee of the Communist Party of Cuba (CPC) was elected at the 5th CPC Congress in 1997.

== Members ==
Name	4th CC	6th CC	Gender
Miguel Acebo Cortiñas	Old	Not	Male
Rogelio Acevedo González	Old	Not	Male
Ricardo Alarcón de Quesada	Old	Reelected	Male
Rolando Alfonso Borges	Old	Reelected	Male
Juan Almeida Bosque	Old	Not	Male
Luis E. Álvarez de la Nuez	Old	Not	Male
Abelardo Alvarez Gil	Old	Reelected	Male
Leonardo Ramón Andollo Valdés	Old	Not	Male
José Ramón Balaguer Cabrera	Old	Not	Male
Félix Baranda Columbié	Old	Reelected	Male
Sixto Batista Santana	Old	Reelected	Male
Jesús Bermúdez Cutiño	Old	Not	Male
Urbelino S. Betancourt Cruces	Old	Not	Male
Carlos Borroto Nordelo	Old	Not	Male
Mario Cabello Marante	Old	Not	Male
Julio Camacho Aguilera	Old	Reelected	Male
Concepción Campa Huergo	Old	Not	Female
Julio Casas Regueiro	Old	Reelected	Male
Bárbara Castillo Cuesta	Old	Not	Female
Fidel Castro Ruz	Old	Retired	Male
Raúl Castro Ruz	Old	Reelected	Male
Faure Chomón Mediavilla	Old	Reelected	Male
Osmany Cienfuegos Gorriarán	Old	Not	Male
Leopoldo Cintra Frías	Old	Reelected	Male
Abelardo Colomé Ibarra	Old	Reelected	Male
Edildo L. Companioni Moreno	New	Not	Male
María del Carmen Concepción González	New	Reelected	Female
Juan Contino Aslán	Old	Not	Male
Sergio Corrieri Hernández	Old	Not	Male
Jaime A. Crombet Hernández-Baquero	Old	Reelected	Male
Jorge Cuevas Ramos	Old	Reelected	Male
Daniel de Jesús Despaigne Girón	New	Not	Male
Carlos Díaz Barranco	Old	Not	Male
Roberto Díaz Leyva	New	Not	Male
Juan Antonio Díaz Pérez	New	Not	Male
Roberto T. Díaz Sotolongo	New	Not	Male
Miguel Díaz-Canel Bermúdez	New	Reelected	Male
Caridad del Rosario Diego Bello	New	Reelected	Female
Jorge Luis Dorta Toledo	New	Not	Male
Carlos P. Dotres Martínez	New	Not	Male
Misael Enamorado Dáger	New	Not	Male
Juan Escalona Reguera	New	Not	Male
Vilma Espín Guillois	Old	Not	Female
Ramón Espinosa Martín	Old	Reelected	Male
Lázaro Fernando Expósito Canto	New	Reelected	Male
José Ramón Fernández Alvarez	Old	Reelected	Male
Carlos Fernández Gondín	Old	Reelected	Male
Sergio Fernández Piloto	New	Not	Male
Yolanda Ferrer Gómez	New	Reelected	Female
Humberto Omar Francis Pardo	New	Not	Male
Ernesto Freire Cazañas	New	Not	Male
Angel E. Garate Domínguez	New	Not	Male
María de los Ángeles García Álvarez	New	Not	Female
Roberto Fernando García Díaz	Old	Not	Male
Rigoberto García Fernández	Old	Not	Male
Guillermo García Frías	Old	Reelected	Male
Yadira García Vera	Old	Not	Female
Victor F. Gaute López	New	Reelected	Male
Luis Ignacio Gómez Gutiérrez	Old	Not	Male
Eusebio Gómez Sánchez	Old	Not	Male
Eliécer Gonzáles Aguilar	New	Not	Male
Rolando Guerrero Mestre	New	Not	Male
Carlos Gutiérrez Calzado	Old	Not	Male
Amado A. Hamut Moreno	New	Not	Male
Armando Hart Dávalos	Old	Reelected	Male
Adis Arbina Hernández Estévez	Old	Not	Male
Melba Hernández Rodríguez del Rey	Old	Reelected	Female
Alfredo Hondal Gonzáles	Old	Not	Male
Pedro Jiménez Expósito	New	Not	Male
Augustín Lage Dávila	Old	Not	Male
Carlos Lage Dávila	Old	Not	Male
Juan Esteban Lazo Hernández	Old	Reelected	Male
Eusebio Leal Spengler	Old	Reelected	Male
Raúl Leliebre Duvergel	New	Not	Male
José Antonio Leyva García	Old	Not	Male
Angela Teresita Leyva Sánchez	New	Not	Female
Jorge Lezcano Pérez	Old	Not	Male
Manuel de J. Limonta Vidal	Old	Not	Male
Lázara Mercedez López Acea	New	Reelected	Female
Néstor López Cuba	Old	Not	Male
Álvaro V. López Miera	Old	Reelected	Male
Alcides López Reyes	New	Not	Male
Wilfredo R. López Rodríguez	New	Not	Male
Orlando Lugo Fonte	Old	Reelected	Male
Zenaida Lugones Tellez	New	Not	Female
Celestino Machado Ross	New	Not	Male
José Ramón Machado Ventura	Old	Reelected	Male
Conrado Marténez Corona	New	Not	Male
Rubén Martínez Puente	Old	Reelected	Male
Julio Martínez Ramírez	New	Not	Male
Jesús Martínez Valladares	New	Not	Male
Eugenio Luis Maynegra Álvarez	Old	Not	Male
Manuel Menéndez Castellanos	Old	Not	Male
José Julián Milián Pino	New	Reelected	Male
Pedro Miret Prieto	New	Not	Male
José Miyar Barruecos	Old	Reelected	Male
Jesús Montane Oropesa	Old	Not	Male
Alfredo Morales Cartaya	Old	Not	Male
Alfonso Noya Martínez	New	Not	Male
Carlos Osorio Remedios	New	Not	Male
Candido Palmero Hernández	Old	Not	Male
Ramón Pardo Guerra	New	Reelected	Male
Lina Olinda Pedraza Rodríguez	Old	Reelected	Female
Pedro Miguel Pérez Betancourt	Old	Not	Male
Santiago Pérez Castellanos	New	Reelected	Male
Juan Pérez Lamas	New	Not	Male
Elba Rosa Pérez Montoya	New	Reelected	Female
Felipe Ramón Pérez Roque	Old	Not	Male
Abel Enrique Prieto Jiménez	Old	Not	Male
Joaquín Quintas Solá	New	Reelected	Male
Barciela Fernando Remírez Estenoz	New	Not	Male
Jorge Risquet Valdés-Saldaña	Old	Not	Male
Otto Rivero Torres	New	Not	Male
Julián Rizo Alvarez	Old	Not	Male
Samuel Carlos Rodiles Planas	Old	Not	Male
Víctor Luis Rodríguez Carballosa	New	Not	Male
Eduardo Rodríguez Cardentey	New	Not	Male
José Luis Rodríguez García	New	Not	Male
Humberto G. Rodríguez González	Old	Not	Male
Adolfo Arnoldo Rodríguez Nodáls	Old	Not	Male
Bruno Eduardo Rodríguez Parrilla	Old	Reelected	Male
Orlando Rodríguez Pérez	Old	Not	Male
Carlos Rafael Rodríguez Rodríguez	Old	Not	Male
Orlando Felipe Rodríguez Romay	New	Not	Male
Ramón Antonio Romero Pérez	New	Reelected	Male
Ulises Rosales del Toro	Old	Reelected	Male
Pedro Ross Leal	Old	Not	Male
Pedro Sáez Montejo	Old	Not	Male
Lena Margarita Sarda Noriega	Old	Not	Female
Jorge Luis Sierra Cruz	New	Not	Male
Rosa Elena Simeon Negrín	Old	Not	Female
José Solar Hernández	Old	Not	Male
Romárico V. Sotomayor García	Old	Reelected	Male
Nelson Torres Pérez	Old	Not	Male
Ramiro Valdés Menendéz	Old	Reelected	Male
Salvador Valdés Mesa	Old	Reelected	Male
Raúl Valdés Vivó	New	Not	Male
Amalia Adelinda Valverde Gutierrez	New	Not	Female
Lázaro Vázquez García	Old	Not	Male
Rolando Vázquez Martínez	New	Not	Male
Fernando Vecino Alegret	Old	Not	Male
Juan Vela Valdés	New	Not	Male
Victoria Velásquez López	New	Not	Male
Roando Vélez Carrión	New	Not	Male
Harry A. Villegas Tamayo	New	Not	Male
Luis Rafael Virelles Barreda	New	Not	Male
