= 4th Central Committee of the Communist Party of Cuba =

The 4th Central Committee of the Communist Party of Cuba (CPC) was elected at the 4th CPC Congress in 1991.

== Members ==
Name	3rd CC	5th CC	Gender
Miguel Acebo Cortiñas	New	Reelected	Male
Rogelio Acevedo González	Old	Reelected	Male
Juan de la C. Aizpurúa	New	Not	Male
Ricardo Alárcon de Quesada	Alt.	Reelected	Male
Carlos Aldana Escalante	Old	Not	Male
Rolando Alfonso Borges	New	Reelected	Male
Juan Almeida Bosque	Old	Reelected	Male
Julián Alvarez Blanco	Alt.	Not	Male
Rodrigo Alvarez Cambras	Old	Not	Male
Luis E. Alvarez de la Nuez	Old	Reelected	Male
Abelardo Alvarez Gil	Old	Reelected	Male
Leonardo Ramón Andollo Valdés	Alt.	Reelected	Male
Feliberto Arazo Hernández	New	Not	Male
Jorge Luis Aspiolea Roig	New	Not	Male
Mario Anastasio Avila Hernández	New	Not	Male
José Ramón Balaguer Cabrera	New	Reelected	Male
Félix Baranda Columbié	Alt.	Reelected	Male
Sixto Batista Santana	Old	Not	Male
Lucio Bencomo Valle	New	Not	Male
Jesús Bermúdez Cutiño	Old	Reelected	Male
Urbelino S. Betancourt Cruces	Old	Reelected	Male
José Ramón Bonachea Valdés	New	Not	Male
Carlos Borroto Nordelo	New	Reelected	Male
Heriberto Bouza González	New	Not	Male
Orestes Bravo Martell	New	Not	Male
Mario Cabello Marante	New	Reelected	Male
Ricardo Cabrisas Ruiz	New	Not	Male
Julio Camacho Aguilera	Old	Reelected	Male
Concepción Campa Huergo	New	Reelected	Female
Tomás V. Cárdenas García	Old	Not	Male
Hortensia Cardoza Pereira	New	Not	Female
José Felipe Carneado Rodríguez	Old	Not	Male
Amparo Zaida Carriera Montes	New	Not	Female
Juan Domingo Carrizo Estévez	New	Not	Male
Julio Casas Regueiro	Old	Reelected	Male
Senén Casas Regueiro	Old	Not	Male
Raúl Castellanos Lage	Alt.	Not	Male
Bárbara Castillo Cuesta	Alt.	Reelected	Female
Fidel Castro Ruz	Old	Reelected	Male
Raúl Castro Ruz	Old	Reelected	Male
Pedro M. Chávez González	Old	Not	Male
Faure Chomón Mediavilla	Old	Reelected	Male
Osmany Cienfuegos Gorriarán	Old	Reelected	Male
Leopoldo Cintra Frías	Old	Reelected	Male
Miriam Isabel Cobas Conte	New	Not	Male
Enrique Collazo Matos	New	Not	Male
Abelardo Colomé Ibarra	Old	Reelected	Male
Juan Contino Aslan	New	Reelected	Male
Sergio Corrieri Hernández	Old	Reelected	Male
Lissette Lellana Cortina García	New	Not	Female
Homero Crabb Valdés	Old	Not	Male
Jaime Crombet Hernández-Baquero	New	Reelected	Male
Eugenio Cuevas Ibáñez	Alt.	Not	Male
Jorge Cuevas Ramos	New	Reelected	Male
Jorge Luis de la Rosa Hilario	New	Not	Male
Sergio del Valle Jiménez	Old	Not	Male
Manuel Eufrasio Delgado Pérez	New	Not	Male
Carlos Díaz Barranco	New	Reelected	Male
Deisys Inocencia Díaz Cabrera	New	Not	Male
Vladimir Díaz Denis	New	Not	Male
Vilma Espín Guillois	Old	Retired	Female
Femando Ramírez Estenoz Barciela	New	Not	Male
Rafaela Estrada Nelson	New	Not	Male
Juan Pedro Febles Rodríguez	New	Not	Male
José Ramón Fernandez Alvarez	Old	Reelected	Male
Oscar Fernández Báez	New	Not	Male
Eladio J. Fernández Cívico	Alt.	Not	Male
Carlos Fernández Gondin	Old	Reelected	Male
Hortensia N. Fernández Rodríguez	New	Not	Female
Julio Avelino Fernández Sánchez	New	Not	Male
René Fernández Suárez	New	Not	Male
Yolanda Ferrer Gómez	Old	Reelected	Female
Humberto Omar Francis Pardo	New	Reelected	Male
Idalme Eumelia Frometa Pons	New	Not	Male
María del Carmen Gallego Boch	New	Not	Female
Luis O. Gálvez Taupler	New	Not	Male
María de los A. García Alvarez	Alt.	Reelected	Female
Felipe García Arango	New	Not	Male
Rubén Servillo García Carballo	New	Not	Male
Teófilo García de la Cruz	New	Not	Male
Roberto Fernando García Díaz	New	Reelected	Male
Rigoberto García Fernández	New	Reelected	Male
Francisco García Ferrer	Alt.	Not	Male
Guillermo García Frías	Old	Reelected	Male
Rodrigo García León	New	Not	Male
Teresa de las M. García Moruarte	New	Not	Female
Yadira E. García Vera	Alt.	Reelected	Female
Luis Ignacio Gómez Gutiérrez	New	Reelected	Male
Víctor Manuel González Albear	New	Not	Male
Emilio González Farrat	New	Not	Male
Irán González Pérez	Alt.	Not	Male
Tania A. González Pérez	New	Not	Female
José González Torres	Old	Not	Male
Rodolfo González Vega	Old	Not	Male
Jacinto Granda de la Serna	New	Not	Male
Alfredo Guevara Valdés	New	Not	Male
Carlos Gutiérrez Calzado	New	Reelected	Male
Carmen Gutiérrez Cepero	Alt.	Not	Female
Armando Hart Dávalos	Old	Reelected	Male
Ramón Hernández Frite	New	Not	Male
Neice Hernández García	New	Not	Male
Ada Caridad Hernández Gutiérrez	New	Not	Female
Digna Raquel Hernández Pérez	New	Not	Female
Juan Ramón Herrera Machado	New	Not	Male
Alciblades J. Hidalgo Basulto	New	Not	Male
Alfredo Hondal González	Old	Reelected	Male
Arquímides Izquierdo Morgado	New	Not	Male
Alfredo Jordán Morales	Old	Not	Male
Alberto Juantorena Danger	Old	Not	Male
Juan Mario Junco del Pino	New	Not	Male
Agustín Lage Dávila	New	Reelected	Male
Carlos Lage Dávila	Old	Reelected	Male
Juan Esteban Lazo Hernández	Old	Reelected	Male
Eusebio Leal Spengler	Old	Reelected	Male
Victorino Lemus Rivero	Alt.	Not	Male
José Antonio Leyva García	New	Reelected	Male
Jorge Lezcano Pérez	Old	Reelected	Male
Manuel de J. Limonta Vidal	Old	Reelected	Male
Francisco Linares Calvo	Old	Not	Male
Néstor López Cuba	Old	Reelected	Male
María Elena López García	Old	Not	Female
Julián López Hernández	New	Not	Male
Alvaro V. López Miera	Alt.	Reelected	Male
Orlando Lugo Fonte	Old	Reelected	Male
Darío Lorenzo Machado Rodríguez	New	Not	Male
José Ramón Machado Ventura	Old	Reelected	Male
Sonia Machín Fernández	New	Not	Female
Isidoro Malmierca Peoli	Old	Not	Male
José Marrero Camacho	New	Not	Male
Juan Carlos Martín Muñoz	New	Not	Male
María del C. Martínez Monteller	New	Not	Female
Rubén Martínez Puente	New	Reelected	Male
María del C. Martínez Vázquez	New	Not	Female
Eugenio Luis Maynegra Álvarez	New	Not	Male
Alexis Mejías Jomarrón	New	Not	Male
Jorge Enrique Mendoza Reboredo	Old	Not	Male
Manuel Menéndez Castellanos	New	Reelected	Male
Iris Maura Menéndez Pérez	New	Not	Female
Raúl Michel Vargas	Old	Not	Male
José Julián Millán Pino	New	Not	Male
José M. Miyar Barrueco	Old	Reelected	Male
Isabel Moinelo Hernández	New	Not	Male
Francisco Montalvo Peñalver	New	Not	Male
Jesús Montané Oropesa	Old	Reelected	Male
Alfredo Morales Cartaya	New	Reelected	Male
José A. Naranjo Morales	Old	Not	Male
Sonta Olivar López	New	Not	Female
Cándido Palmero Hernández	New	Reelected	Male
Anicia Pardo Lazo	New	Not	Female
Evelio Pausa Bello	New	Not	Male
Lina Olinda Pedraza Rodríguez	New	Reelected	Female
Tomás Gregorio Peña Osorio	New	Not	Male
Pedro Miguel A. Pérez Betancourt	Alt.	Reelected	Male
Faustino Pérez Hernández	Old	Not	Male
Felipe Ramón Pérez Roque	New	Reelected	Male
Pablo Pérez Villavlcenclo	New	Not	Male
Manuel Piñeiro Losada	New	Not	Male
Marcos J. Portal León	New	Not	Male
Abel Enrique Prieto Jiménez	New	Reelected	Male
Joaquín Quintas Solé	Old	Not	Male
Fidel Ramos Perera	Old	Not	Male
Mirian Reyes Castillo	New	Not	Female
Roberto León Richards Aguiar	New	Not	Male
Eloy Riera Nelson	New	Not	Male
Jorge Risquet Valdés-Saldaña	New	Reelected	Male
Julián Rizo Alvarez	Old	Reelected	Male
Roberto Robaina González	Old	Not	Male
Juan C. Robinson Agramonte	Old	Not	Male
Alejandro F. Roca Iglesias	Alt.	Not	Male
Samuel Carlos Rodiles Planas	Alt.	Reelected	Male
Melba Hernández Rodríguez del Rey	Old	Reelected	Female
Humberto G. Rodríguez González	New	Reelected	Male
Héctor Rodríguez Llompart	Old	Not	Male
Antonio Rodríguez Maurell	Old	Not	Male
Adolfo Arnoldo Rodríguez Nodáls	Alt.	Reelected	Male
Bruno Eduardo Rodríguez Parrilla	New	Reelected	Male
Orlando Rodríguez Pérez	New	Reelected	Male
Carlos Rafael Rodríguez Rodríguez	Old	Reelected	Male
Marcelino Rodríguez Tejada	New	Not	Male
Enrique Román Hernández	New	Not	Male
Antonio de Jesús Romillo Tarke	New	Not	Male
Lázaro Ricardo Rosa Corzo	New	Not	Male
Ulises Rosales del Toro	Old	Reelected	Male
Pedro Ross Leal	Old	Reelected	Male
Alcides Sagarra Caron	New	Not	Male
Lena Margarita Sardá Noriega	New	Reelected	Female
Rosa Elena Simeón de Negrín	Old	Reelected	Female
José Solar Hernández	New	Reelected	Male
Rafael M. Soler Deschapells	New	Not	Male
Lionel Soto Prieto	New	Not	Male
Romárico V. Sotomayor García	Alt.	Reelected	Male
Francisco Suárez Díaz	New	Not	Male
Lidia M. Tablada Romero	New	Not	Female
Gumersindo Tasse de Moya	New	Not	Male
Eduardo Tejera Martínez	New	Not	Male
Julio Tejera Pérez	New	Not	Male
Nelson Torres Pérez	New	Reelected	Male
Ramiro Valdés Menéndez	Old	Reelected	Male
Salvador Valdés Mesa	Old	Reelected	Male
Jorge Valdés Rodríguez	Old	Not	Male
Plácido Valdés Valdés	New	Not	Male
Lázaro Vázquez García	Old	Reelected	Male
Arturo Vázquez Hernández	New	Not	Male
Fernando Vecino Alegret	Old	Reelected	Male
Armando Velázquez Pérez	New	Not	Male
Manuel Vila Cruz	Old	Not	Male
