= Secretariat of the Communist Party of Cuba =

The Secretariat is the highest executive organ of the Central Committee of the Communist Party of Cuba.

== History ==
The Secretariat of the Central Committee was established on 3 October 1965 when the United Party of the Cuban Socialist Revolution was transformed into the present-day Communist Party of Cuba. It was implementing the decisions of the Politburo and Central Committee, and led by the First and Second Secretary of the Central Committee. Of the ten members elected to the Provisional Secretariat three concurrently served as members of the Provisional Politburo.

The Secretariat was abolished at the 4th Party Congress, held on 10–14 October 1991, with the intention of streamlining the party's decision-making process. It was later reestablished at the 5th Plenary Session of the 5th Central Committee on 4 July 2006.

=== Terms ===
Term	Members			Period		Duration
Term	Male	Female	Reelected	Start	End	Duration
Provisional	10	0	8	3 October 1965	17 December 1975	10 years, 75 days
1st	9	0	5	22 December 1975	17 December 1980	4 years, 361 days
2nd	9	0	7	20 December 1980	4 February 1986	5 years, 46 days
3rd	6	0	—	7 February 1986	10 October 1991	5 years, 245 days
5th	11	4	7	4 July 2006	16 April 2011	4 years, 286 days
6th	9	1	6	19 April 2011	16 April 2016	4 years, 363 days
7th	9	2	1	19 April 2016	16 April 2021	4 years, 362 days
8th	6	0	—	19 April 2021	Incumbent	3 years, 344 days

== See also ==
- Central Committee of the Communist Party of Cuba
- Politburo of the Communist Party of Cuba
