= 7th Secretariat of the Communist Party of Cuba =

The 7th Secretariat of the Communist Party of Cuba (PCC) was elected in 2016 by the 1st Plenary Session of the 7th Central Committee in the immediate aftermath of the 7th Party Congress.

== Officers ==
Title	Name	Birth	Gender
First Secretary of the Central Committee of the Communist Party of Cuba	Raúl Modesto Castro Ruz	1931	Male
Second Secretary of the Central Committee of the Communist Party of Cuba	José Ramón Machado Ventura	1930	Male

== Members ==
Rank	Name	6th SEC	8th SEC	Birth	Gender
1	José Ramón Machado Ventura	Old	Not	1930	Male
2	Abelardo Álvarez Gil	Old	Not	1945	Male
3	José Ramón Balaguer Cabrera	Old	Retired	1932	Male
4	Olga Lidia Tapia Iglesias	Old	Retired	1962	Female
5	Jorge Cuevas Ramos	Old	Retired	1962	Male
6	Omar Fernando Ruiz Martín	Old	Retired	1963	Male

== Changes ==
Name	Change	Date	8th SEC	Birth	Gender
Víctor Fidel Gaute López	Elected	27 March 2018	Not	1960	Male
Lázara Mercedes López Acea	Elected	28 June 2018	Not	1964	Female
José Ramón Monteagudo Ruiz	Elected	3 July 2018	Reelected	19??	Male
