= 2006–2008 Cuban transfer of presidential duties =

Fidel Castro to Raúl Castro handover

The 2006–2008 Cuban transfer of presidential duties was the transfer of the title of president and presidential duties from longtime Cuban leader Fidel Castro to his brother, First Vice President Raúl Castro, the next-in-line-of-succession person in Cuba, following Fidel's operation and recovery from an undisclosed digestive illness believed to be diverticulitis. Although Raúl Castro exercised the duties of president, Fidel Castro retained the titles of president of the Council of State of Cuba (head of state), president of the Council of Ministers of Cuba (head of government) and first secretary of the Communist Party of Cuba (de facto leader) during this period.

Fidel had been in power since Cuban Revolution and held the title of prime minister of Cuba since 1959. At the time of his operation in July 2006, he was nearly 80 years old and the last governing communist leader from the Cold War era. Fidel felt proud to have not only thwarted the Bay of Pigs Invasion, CIA attempts to assassinate him, and acts of Cuban exile violence, but also to have outlived the Cold War and the USSR. For years, he had exhorted the Cuban people to brave the crippling effects of the U.S. embargo against Cuba (largely to whip up patriotic fury against the U.S.) and the aftermath of the collapse of the Soviet Union. While the radical left (especially Hugo Chavez and Evo Morales) praised Castro as a tireless defender of the poor and oppressed in Latin America and Africa while standing up to U.S. hegemony in the Americas, Fidel Castro's sworn enemies, namely the U.S. and Cuban-Americans, saw him as a ruthless tyrant who broke his promise to restore democracy to Cuba by imposing a repressive communist government on the island that muzzled all opposition and wrecked the Cuban economy.

On February 19, 2008, Fidel announced that he would not stand for re-election as president at the next meeting of the National Assembly of People's Power. Raúl was elected president by the National Assembly on February 24, 2008. Fidel Castro remained the first secretary of the Communist Party of Cuba, the most senior position in the one-party state until 2011.

== July 2006 announcement ==
The transfer of duties was announced in a proclamation read on state television at 8:15 p.m. by Castro's secretary, Carlos Valenciaga. The proclamation appeared on the Granma website that night and was printed in Cuba's national newspaper Granma, the next day. In his statement of delegation, Castro stated: "The operation has obliged me to take several weeks of rest, at a remove from my responsibilities and duties." The proclamation transferred to his brother the functions as first secretary of the Central Committee of the Cuban Communist Party, comandante of the Armed Forces, president of the Council of State, and of the government of the Republic of Cuba. It transferred other functions to José Ramón Balaguer Cabrera, José Ramón Machado Ventura, Esteban Lazo Hernández, and Carlos Lage Dávila.

Castro also announced in his statement that he had spoken to the Guayasamín Foundation, whose responsibilities included organizing his upcoming 80th birthday celebrations on August 13, 2006. He requested that the group postpone the celebrations until December 2, 2006, the 50th anniversary of the Granma landing. The letter ended with the Cuban leader's customary pronouncements: "Imperialism will never be able to crush Cuba. The Battle of Ideas will continue advancing. ¡Viva la Patria! ¡Viva la Revolución! ¡Viva el Socialismo! ¡Hasta la Victoria Siempre! (Long live the Motherland! Long live the revolution! Long live socialism! Ever onward to victory!)".

The transfer of power was in line with Article 94 of the Cuban Constitution, which states: "In cases of the absence, illness or death of the president of the Council of State, the first vice president assumes the president's duties".

== Timeline ==
=== 2006 ===
==== July ====
- July 26 – Fidel Castro was present at the 53rd anniversary celebrations of the assault on Moncada Barracks. Prior to that, Castro had just returned from a visit to a Mercosur summit in Córdoba, Argentina, which included a confrontation with a group of journalists over the issue of providing a visa for Cuban dissident Dr. Hilda Molina, as well as a visit to Che Guevara's childhood home. In his announcement printed in the Cuban media, Castro stated that the "days and nights of continuous work, almost without sleep took its toll on my health, put me under extreme stress and my health was affected".
- July 31 – a proclamation was made transferring control of the responsibilities and functions of the government to Castro's brother, Raúl. Fidel Castro was subsequently hospitalized because of what the Cuban government said was gastrointestinal bleeding, which it attributed to stress. Later, a message the Cuban government said was from Castro, saying that his health was stable, was read on state television.

==== August ====
- August 7 – Cuban intellectual and government member, Roberto Fernández Retamar, further fueled speculation of Castro's ultimate demise by saying at a news conference, "They (U.S. Government) had not expected that a peaceful succession was possible. A peaceful succession has taken place in Cuba."
- August 13 – Castro's 80th birthday, the Cuban government released a statement it attributed to Castro which read: "I ask you all to be optimistic, and at the same time to be ready to face any adverse news... For all those who care about my health, I promise I'll fight for it." The government also released photos showing Castro using a telephone and posing with a recent Granma edition dated August 12.
- August 14 – the Cuban television channels showed a six-minute clip of Hugo Chávez visiting Castro.

==== September ====
- September 3 – Castro was able to write notes and give orders as he recovered from surgery, Venezuelan President Hugo Chávez said. "He's writing already, (before) he couldn't even write, he was in recovery," Chávez said during his weekly Sunday broadcast, showing a handwritten note he said Castro had given him during his surprise visit to Cuba the previous week. "He already sits up, writes, he has a phone, he gives orders, instructions." Castro's exact health problem was kept a state secret in Cuba, leading to intense speculation over his condition and the future of Cuba's government. He had not been seen in public since the announcement of the handover. Televised images taken during Chávez's visit showed Castro sitting up and speaking enthusiastically in further evidence that he is recovering.
- September 5 – the Cuban government released a letter from Castro stating, "It can be affirmed that the most critical moment has been left behind. Today, I recover at a satisfactory pace."

==== October ====
- October 28 – Images of Castro walking, talking on the telephone and reading the day's newspaper were broadcast in Cuba. Castro also dismissed rumors that he was dead, saying that he was taking part in government decisions, following the news and making regular phone calls.

==== November ====
- November 6 – Cuban foreign minister, Felipe Perez Roque, backed away from his earlier prediction that Castro would return to power in early December, further fueling speculation that Castro's health was much worse than Cuban government officials were saying.

==== December ====
- December 2 – Castro failed to show for a parade celebrating his 80th birthday, further fueling speculation that he was gravely ill and would never return to power.
- December 24 – Spanish newspaper El Periódico de Catalunya reported that Spanish surgeon José Luis García Sabrido had been flown to Cuba on a plane chartered by the Cuban government. Dr. García Sabrido is an intestinal expert who further specializes in the treatment of cancer. The plane in which Dr. García Sabrido traveled was reported to be carrying a large quantity of advanced medical equipment.
- December 26 – shortly after returning to Madrid, Dr. García Sabrido held a news conference in which he answered questions about Castro's health. He stated that "He does not have cancer, he has a problem with his digestive system," and added, "His condition is stable. He is recovering from a very serious operation. It is not planned that he will undergo another operation for the moment."

=== 2007 ===
==== January ====
- January 16 – Spanish paper El País stated in a large article that Castro was in critical condition after three operations and that he was now fed through an infusion. According to El País, Castro was suffering from a severe infection of the abdominal membrane.
- January 20 – Venezuelan President Hugo Chávez claimed Castro was "fighting for his life"; a Spanish surgeon, who had not examined Castro believed that the Cuban was "in a grave condition".
- January 30 – Cuban television and the paper Juventud Rebelde showed a fresh video and photos from a meeting between Castro and Hugo Chávez said to have taken place the previous day.

==== February ====
- February 28 – Castro made a surprise phone call to Venezuelan President Hugo Chávez's radio talk show Aló Presidente, and the two leaders conversed live on air for thirty minutes. During the conversation, Castro declared that he now had "more energy and strength".

==== April ====
- April 21 – Top Chinese official Wu Guanzheng met Fidel Castro and Raúl Castro in Havana for bilateral talks between the two countries. Fidel Castro was photographed shaking hands with the Chinese official and was reported to have gained back some of the weight he lost during his illness.

==== May ====
- May 1 – Castro failed to make a public appearance at May Day celebrations in Cuba for only the third time in nearly five decades.
- May 29 – Castro wrote about his illness for the first time, stating that he had three operations to halt the intestinal bleeding that sidelined him in July 2006. He added that he was fed by intravenous lines and catheters "for many months" before making a slow recovery.

==== December ====
- December 18 – Castro hinted at the possibility of retiring for the first time, stating that his "basic duty is not to cling to office".

=== 2008 ===
==== February ====
- February 19 – Castro officially declined to stand for re-election as President of the State Council, declaring that he "will not aspire to or accept" the presidential position nor that of the commander-in-chief, therefore ending a 49-year incumbency.
- February 24 – The National Assembly of People's Power unanimously selects Raúl Castro to succeed Fidel as President of the State Council.

== Reaction in the Americas ==
=== Caribbean ===
Along with well wishes from many leaders from around the world, the prime minister of the Federation of Saint Kitts and Nevis, Dr. Denzil Douglas wished the "political legend" Castro a swift recovery on behalf of the Caribbean Community (CARICOM). Douglas was unwavering in his support, saying, "At this challenging time for the people of Cuba, we of Caricom want them to know that we wish for President Fidel Castro a successful recovery, and soon. He has proven to be a great friend of the Caribbean and of all poor and developing countries struggling for a better life for their peoples." He also warned against trying to create instability during the transition, adding: "We in CARICOM sincerely hope that as President Castro...recovers, and acting President Raúl Castro takes on the very demanding responsibilities as Head of State, that there would be no adventurism on the part of any and from whatever quarter, to create problems for the Cuban people..."

Thereafter Saint Lucia's Prime Minister Dr. Kenny Anthony also issued a series of well wishes for his Cuban counterpart. Dr. Anthony said he was just as surprised as the Cuban people and the rest of the world by the sudden news of President Castro's illness. But, he added, he was "also confident that he is receiving the best medical care in the world, because the quality of health care in Cuba is exceedingly good and I'm sure he is being given the very best medical care. In his press release the Saint Lucian Prime Minister also said, "The Cabinet of Ministers, and indeed the people of Saint Lucia, have much admiration for the Cuban President and his personal interest in making humanitarian and social assistance available to Saint Lucia and the rest of the Caribbean, especially in the fields of health and education."

=== United States ===
On July 31, just hours prior to the announcement of Castro's condition, U.S. President George W. Bush told WAQI-AM, a Spanish-language radio station in Miami, "If Fidel Castro were to move on because of natural causes, we've got a plan in place to help the people of Cuba understand there's a better way than the system in which they've been living under. No one knows when Fidel Castro will move on. In my judgment, that's the work of the Almighty." On August 2, Senator Robert Bennett (R-Utah) said President Bush told him the administration was surprised by the announcement of Castro's illness, "The president's comment was that everybody was caught by surprise, and we'll have to wait and see what U.S. action is necessary. I think all of us can say we had no idea this was coming."

Senators met in Washington, D.C. to discuss "A Democratic Cuba After Castro", as many senators argued that the United States should have a plan in case the United States would need to offer any help to Cuba during a transfer of duties.

Cuban-American Senator Mel Martinez stated that he and many other Cuban-Americans regard Raúl Castro as a temporary figure and not someone capable of leading Cuba into the future.

There were celebrations among the large Cuban-American population of Miami, Florida, Jersey City, New Jersey, and several other smaller Cuban communities in the US opposed to Castro's regime.

On August 3, 2006, the White House released the following statement:

The United States is actively monitoring the situation in Cuba following the announcement of a transfer of power. At this time of uncertainty in Cuba, one thing is clear: The United States is absolutely committed to supporting the Cuban people’s aspirations for democracy and freedom. We have repeatedly said that the Cuban people deserve to live in freedom. I encourage all democratic nations to unite in support of the right of the Cuban people to define a democratic future for their country. I urge the Cuban people to work for democratic change on the island. We will support you in your effort to build a transitional government in Cuba committed to democracy, and we will take note of those, in the current Cuban regime, who obstruct your desire for a free Cuba. In the event of a transition in the Cuban government, we stand ready to provide humanitarian assistance as needed to help the Cuban people. It has long been the hope of the United States to have a free, independent, and democratic Cuba as a close friend and neighbor. In achieving this, the Cuban people can count on the full and unconditional support of the United States.

=== Latin America ===
President of Venezuela Hugo Chávez and President of Bolivia Evo Morales both made statements of support for Castro's recovery. Luiz Inácio Lula da Silva, the Brazilian president and a long-time friend of Castro, said "Cubans alone should decide on a possible presidential successor. The succession process is a decision the Cuban people will have to take".

Numerous Latin American publications, including Peru's La República, and Bolivia's La Razón, ran front-page articles about the event, featuring pictures of a frail-looking Castro, head in hand. Others, such as Mexico City's La Crónica de Hoy and El Sol de México, focused on the bond between Castro and his brother Raúl, the former showing a picture of the two walking together, the latter a picture of an elderly Fidel with arm held aloft by Raúl. A headline in Peru's La República declared Castro's cessation of duties to be "the end of an era", while Venezuela's El Universal said the event was "unprecedented in 47 years of power."

On August 5, 2006, the Brazilian newspaper Folha de S.Paulo reported that Cuban authorities had informed Brazilian president Lula da Silva that Castro's health was much worse than what the Cuban government had previously admitted in public, contending that he was suffering from intestinal cancer and will be unable to resume control of the Cuban state. The Brazilian government quickly denied that the report was accurate. Folha's editors responded to the government's denials by saying their sources were Castro's top aides.

== See also ==
- Political career of Fidel Castro
