= Ricardo Cabrisas =

Cuban politician and diplomat (1937–2025)

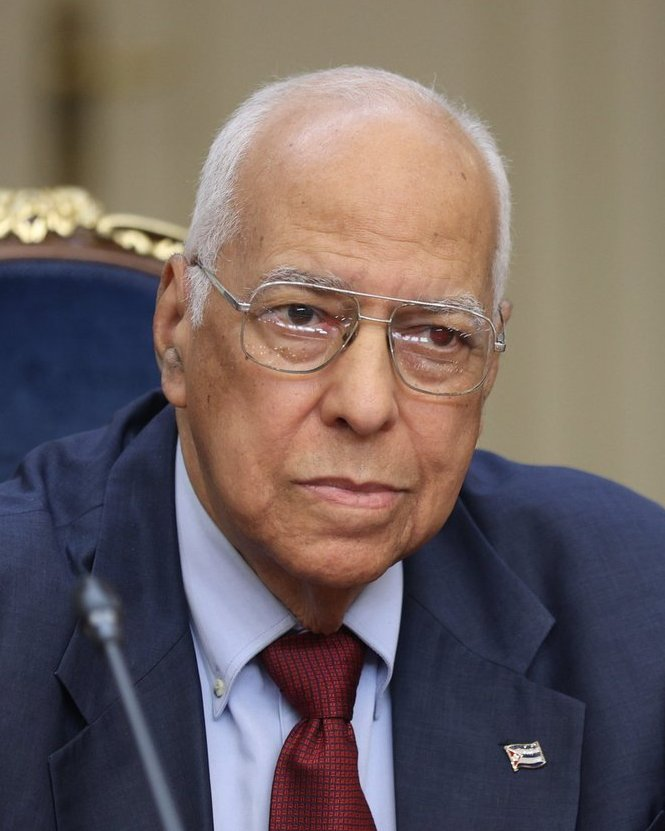
Ricardo Cabrisas Ruiz in 2022

Ricardo Cabrisas Ruiz (January 21, 1937 – September 16, 2025) was a Cuban politician and diplomat. A member of the Communist Party of Cuba, he held senior government posts for more than four decades, most notably as Minister of Foreign Trade from 1980 to 2000 and again as Minister of Foreign Trade and Foreign Investment between 2023 and 2024. He also served as Vice President of the Council of Ministers (2008–2019), Minister of Economy and Planning (2016–2018), and Deputy Prime Minister (2023–2025). Known for his role in Cuba's economic diplomacy, he negotiated international agreements and represented the country in foreign relations.

== Early life ==
Cabrisas was born on January 21, 1937, in Havana. He studied political science and medicine, though he did not complete either degree.

== Career ==
In 1961, two years after the triumph of the Cuban Revolution (in which there is no record of his active participation), Cabrisas joined the newly created Ministry of Foreign Trade. In the following years, he rose through various minor foreign posts, such as Commercial Counsellor in Uruguay and Canada.

From 1971 to 1973, Cabrisas served as Cuba's ambassador to Japan. Over subsequent decades he became the government's chief negotiator on foreign debt, representing the country in talks with both state and private creditors and leading economic negotiations with partners such as China and Russia. He also took part in negotiations with financial actors considered less aligned with Cuba's model, such as the Paris Club, with which he renegotiated debt in 2025 in France.

Cabrisas sat as a deputy in the Cuban parliament and was a member of the Central Committee of the Communist Party of Cuba (PCC), the country's only legal party. He headed the Ministry of Foreign Trade from 1980 to 2000, and held other senior government posts including Minister of Economy and Planning (2016–2018) and Vice President of the Council of Ministers (2008–2019). During the first ordinary session of the IX Legislature of the National Assembly, he again assumed the role of Vice President of the Council of Ministers while also serving as Minister of Foreign Trade and Foreign Investment.

On May 23, 2024, President Miguel Díaz-Canel replaced Cabrisas as Minister of Foreign Commerce, naming Oscar Pérez, then first deputy minister, as his successor. Cabrisas continued in his post as Deputy Prime Minister.

== Honors ==
Cabrias held the honorary title of Hero of Labour of the Republic of Cuba.

In February 2025, Cabrisas received in Havana the Grand Cordon of the Order of the Rising Sun from the government of Japan, the second-highest distinction awarded to foreign nationals, for his sustained efforts over five decades to deepen bilateral relations.

== Personal life ==
Cabrisas was married to Hilda, and had a son, Ricardo.

== Death ==
Cabrisas died in Havana on September 16, 2025, at the age of 88. According to a statement by the Communist Party of Cuba, he had been suffering from an unspecified illness. President Miguel Díaz-Canel confirmed his death on the social network X, describing Cabrisas as "an exemplary man who dedicated his entire life to the Revolution" and offering condolences to his family. State media also reported that he "enjoyed the full confidence of Fidel and Raúl Castro." He was buried with military honors at Havana's Colón Cemetery on September 18, 2025. Floral tributes were placed by Raúl Castro and President Miguel Díaz-Canel, while Prime Minister Manuel Marrero praised his decades of service in foreign trade, economic diplomacy, and government leadership. The ceremony was attended by senior Communist Party and state officials, including Vice President Salvador Valdés Mesa, Esteban Lazo Hernández, and Ramiro Valdés Menéndez.
