= 4th Central Committee =

4th Central Committee may refer to:

- Central Committee of the 4th Congress of the Russian Social Democratic Labour Party, 1906–1907
- 4th Central Executive Committee of the Chinese Communist Party, 1925–1927
- 4th Central Committee of the Communist Party of Cuba, 1991–1997
- 4th Central Committee of the Lao People's Revolutionary Party, 1986–1991
- 4th Central Committee of the Communist Party of Vietnam, 1976–1982
- Central Committee of the 4th Congress of the Communist Party of Yugoslavia, 1928–1945
- 4th Central Committee of the Workers' Party of Korea, 1961–1970
