= 8th Secretariat of the Communist Party of Cuba =

The 8th Secretariat of the Communist Party of Cuba (PCC) was elected in 2021 by the 1st plenary session of the 8th Central Committee in the immediate aftermath of the 8th Party Congress.

== Officers ==
Title	Name	Birth	Gender
First Secretary of the Central Committee of the Communist Party of Cuba	Miguel Díaz-Canel	1961	Male

== Members ==
Rank	Name	7th SEC	Birth	Gender
1	Roberto Morales Ojeda	New	1967	Male
2	Rogelio Polanco Fuentes	New	19??	Male
3	Joel Queipo Ruiz	New	1971	Male
4	José Ramón Monteagudo Ruiz	Old	19??	Male
5	Félix Duarte Ortega	New	1975	Male
6	Jorge Luis Broche Lorenzo	New	1970	Male
