= José Miguel Pérez (politician) =

Spanish politician (1896–1936)

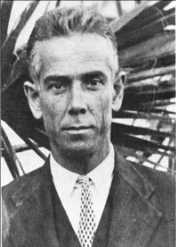

1st General Secretary of the Communist Party of Cuba
- In office 18 August 1925 – 31 August 1925
- Preceded by: Position established
- Succeeded by: José Peña Vilaboa

Personal details
- Born: 8 December 1896 Santa Cruz de La Palma, Kingdom of Spain
- Died: 4 September 1936 (aged 39) Barranco del Hierro, Tenerife, Spanish Republic
- Party: Popular Socialist Party (Cuba)
- Other political affiliations: Communist Party of Spain; Communist Party of the Canary Islands
- Occupation: Politician
- Profession: Teacher

José Miguel Pérez (8 December 1896 – 4 September 1936) was a Canarian politician. He founded the Cuban Communist Party (Partido Comunista Cubano) in 1925 along with Carlos Baliño, Alfonso Bernal del Riesgo, and Julio Antonio Mella.

== Biography ==
He was born on the island of La Palma in 1896, and in 1921 he emigrated to Cuba, where he joined the Socialist Group of Havana. In 1926, together with union members, students, and intellectuals, he formed the Communist Group of Havana. In 1925, alongside Julio Antonio Mella, he founded the Communist Party of Cuba, with José Miguel Pérez being elected as its general secretary.

During the dictatorship of Gerardo Machado, he was expelled from Cuba and returned to the island of La Palma. In the Canary Islands, he continued his political activity and in 1929 founded the La Palma Workers' Federation and the newspaper Espartaco. He also participated in the founding of the Socialist Party in La Palma and, in 1933, the Communist Party of the Canary Islands. He was elected general secretary of the Communist Party of the Canary Islands in La Palma. He became one of the most important figures in the party, alongside Gomeran Guillermo Ascanio. During this time, through the Espartaco newspaper, he criticized the bourgeois nature of the Second Spanish Republic. He later adopted the political line of the PCE and influenced the Communist Party of the Canary Islands to participate in the Popular Front. He took part in the resistance against the military coup of Francisco Franco in La Palma during the period known as the Red Week. After the island fell to the Nationalists, he was arrested and taken to Tenerife, where he was sentenced to death.

On 4 September 1936, he was executed by firing squad by the coup forces in Barranco del Hierro, a place where numerous political prisoners were executed.
