= Baliño =

Baliño is a surname. Notable people with the surname include:

- Carlos Baliño (1848–1926), Cuban writer
- Enrique Baliño (1928–2018), Uruguayan basketball player
