= Central Committee of the Communist Party of Cuba =

Organ of the Cuban government

The Central Committee of the Communist Party of Cuba (PCC) is the highest organ between two congresses.

== History ==
The Central Committee was established on 3 October 1965 when the United Party of the Cuban Socialist Revolution was transformed into the present-day Communist Party of Cuba. Between Central Committee plenary sessions the Politburo and the Secretariat meet in its place. It has been led since its establishment in 1965 by the First and Second Secretary of the Central Committee.

Alternate membership of the Central Committee was abolished at the 4th Party Congress, held on 10–14 October 1991, with the intention of streamlining the party's decision-making process.

=== Terms ===
Term	Members			Period		Duration
Term	Male	Female	Reelected	Start	End	Duration
Provisional	95	5	87	3 October 1965	17 December 1975	10 years, 75 days
1st	117	9	95	22 December 1975	17 December 1980	4 years, 361 days
2nd	?	?	?	20 December 1980	4 February 1986	5 years, 46 days
3rd	225	?	99	7 February 1986	10 October 1991	5 years, 245 days
4th	250	?	?	14 October 1991	8 October 1997	5 years, 354 days
5th	130	20	45	8 October 1997	16 April 2011	13 years, 190 days
6th	71	44	76	19 April 2011	16 April 2016	4 years, 363 days
7th	85	57	58	19 April 2016	16 April 2021	4 years, 362 days
8th	62	53	—	19 April 2021	Incumbent	3 years, 334 days

== See also ==
- Politburo of the Communist Party of Cuba
- Secretariat of the Communist Party of Cuba
