= First Secretary of the Communist Party of Cuba =

Head of the Communist Party of Cuba

- Primer Secretario del Partido Comunista de Cuba
- Logo of the Communist Party of Cuba

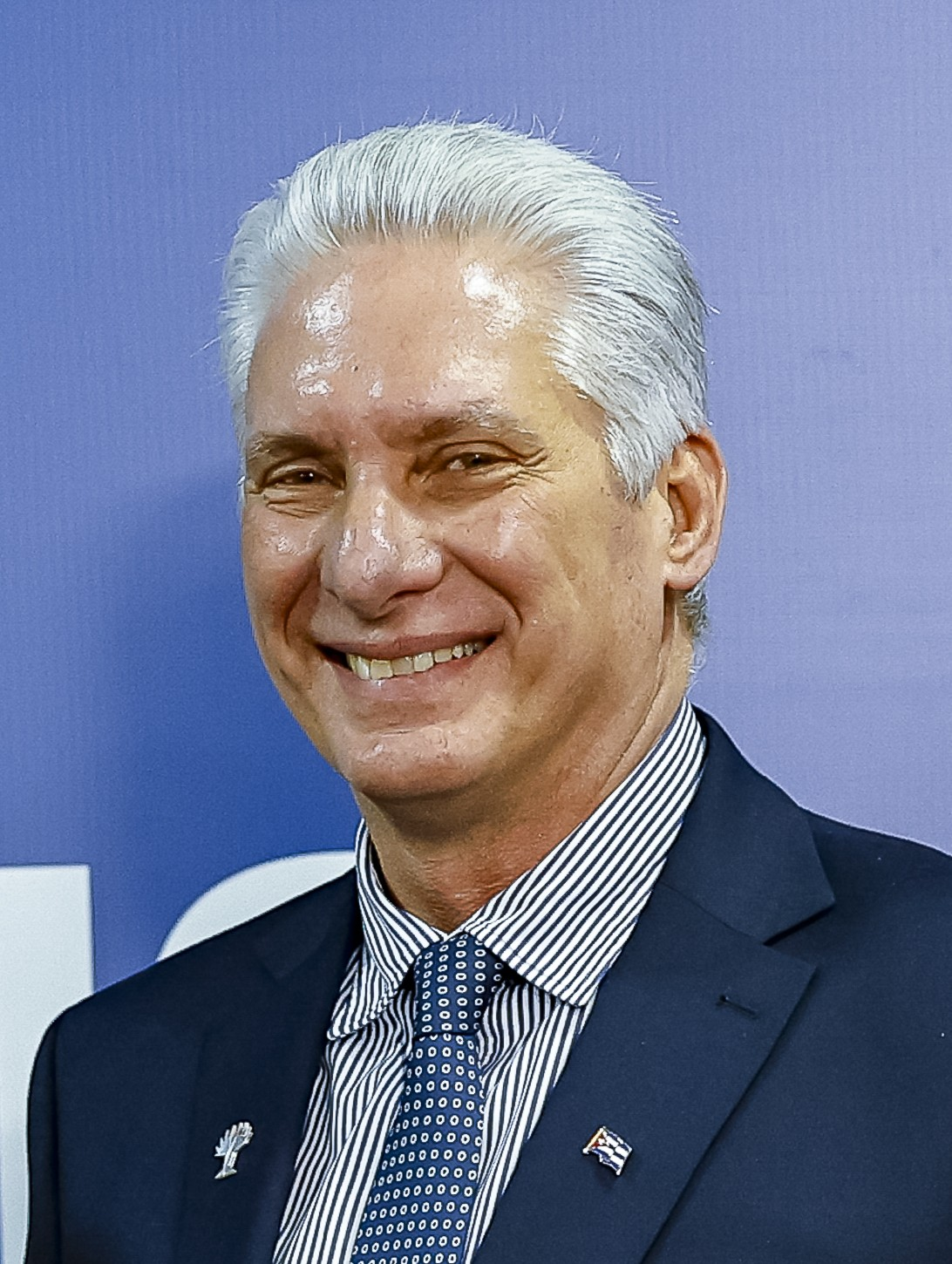
- Incumbent; Miguel Díaz-Canel since 19 April 2021
- Central Committee
- Style: Comrade (formal)
- Type: Party leader
- Member of: Central Committee, Politburo, Secretariat
- Seat: Palace of the Revolution; Havana, Cuba
- Appointer: Central Committee
- Term length: Five years, renewable once
- Constituting instrument: Statute of the Communist Party of Cuba
- Formation: 18 August 1925; 101 years ago
- First holder: José Miguel Pérez
- Deputy: Second Secretary

The first secretary of the Central Committee of the Communist Party of Cuba is the leader of Cuba. The first secretary is the highest office within the Communist Party of Cuba, which makes the officeholder the most powerful person in the Cuban party-state. In Communist states, the first or general secretary of a ruling Communist party is typically the de facto leader of the country and a more powerful position than state offices such as President (head of state) or Prime Minister (head of government), when different individuals hold those positions.

The officeholder of the post of first secretary presides over the work of the Central Committee of the Communist Party of Cuba (PCC), which is designated as "the organised vanguard of the Cuban nation" and as "the superior driving force of society and the state" by Article 5 of Cuba's constitution. The PCC Central Committee, the Party's highest political-executive organ between convocations of the party congress, has the right to elect and dismiss the first secretary at one of its sessions. The first secretary is responsible for leading the work of the Secretariat, the Party's highest executive organ, and chairing the sessions of the Politburo, the Party's highest political organ. The current first secretary is Miguel Díaz-Canel, elected by the 1st Session of the 8th Central Committee on 19 April 2021, and he concurrently serves as president of Cuba.

The first forerunner organisation to the present-day PCC was formed on 18 August 1925, and it elected the Spain-born José Miguel Pérez as its leader. Due to repressive actions by the Cuban state of Gerardo Machado, Pérez was kicked out of the country thirteen days later, on 31 August. This brought the newly established party into turmoil, and José Peña Vilaboa took over Pérez's position and kept the position until his death on 13 March 1927. Due to his health struggles, Miguel Valdés García served as acting general secretary for most of Peña Vilaboa's tenure. Valdés García continued to do so until April 1927, when Joaquín Valdés Hernández was elected general secretary. State repression and bad organisation brought party work to a standstill until the Communist International (Comintern) appointed Jorge Abilio Vivó d’Escoto as party general secretary in 1930. In August 1933, a general strike took place in Havana that called for Machado's removal. Vivó is said to have misjudged the revolutionary situation, and he was forced to step down on the Comintern's orders at the 2nd Congress, held on 20–22 April 1934.

Blas Roca Calderio was elected in Vivó's place and stayed in office until 24 June 1961 when the party merged with the 26th of July Movement and the Revolutionary Directorate of 13 March Movement to form the Integrated Revolutionary Organizations (IRO), which elected Fidel Castro as its first secretary. The IRO was transformed into the United Party for the Socialist Revolution of Cuba (PURSC) on 26 March 1962. Three years later, on 3 October 1965, the PURSC convened the 1st Congress of the newly established Communist Party of Cuba. The 1st Central Committee, which had been elected by the 1st Congress, convened for its 1st Session on 3 October 1965 and elected Fidel as first secretary. He remained in office for 49 years until the convocation of the 1st Plenary Session of the 6th Central Committee on 19 April 2011, which elected his brother Raúl Castro to succeed him in office. Raúl remained in office for two electoral terms and was succeeded by Miguel Díaz-Canel on 19 April 2021.

== Institutional history ==
Institutional history of the highest-standing office of the Communist Party of Cuba
Title	Established	Abolished	Established by	Ref.
General Secretary of the Central Committee of the Communist Party of Cuba; Spanish: Secretario General del Comité Central del Partido Comunista de Cuba	18 August 1925	13 August 1939	1st Congress	
General Secretary of the Central Committee of the Revolutionary Communist Union; Spanish: Secretario General del Comité Central de la Unión Comunista Revolucionaria	13 August 1939	22 January 1944	Central Committee of the 3rd Congress	
General Secretary of the Central Committee of the Popular Socialist Party; Spanish: Secretario General del Comité Central del Partido Socialista Popular	22 January 1944	24 June 1961	4th Congress	
First Secretary of the National Directorate of the Integrated Revolutionary Organizations; Spanish: Primer Secretario de la Dirección Nacional de Organizaciones Revolucionarias Integradas	26 July 1961	26 March 1962	?	
First Secretary of the Central Committee of the United Party for the Socialist Revolution of Cuba; Spanish: Primer Secretario del Comité Central del Partido Unido para la Revolución Socialista de Cuba	26 March 1962	3 October 1965	?	
First Secretary of the Central Committee of the Communist Party of Cuba; Spanish: Primer Secretario del Comité Central del Partido Comunista de Cuba	3 October 1965	Present	1st Congress	

== Officeholders ==
No.	Portrait	Name (born-died)	Term of office			Committee	Ref.
No.	Portrait	Name (born-died)	Took office	Left office	Time in office	Committee	Ref.
General Secretary of the Central Committee of the Cuban Communist Party (1925–1939)
1		José Miguel Pérez (1896–1936)	18 August 1925	31 August 1925	13 days	1st	
2		José Peña Vilaboa (1891–1927)	September 1925	13 March 1927	2 years, 193 days	1st	
3		Joaquín Valdés Hernández (?–?)	April 1927	29 March 1930	3 years, 363 days	1st	
4		Jorge A. Vivó (1906–1979)	29 March 1930	22 April 1934	4 years, 24 days	1st	
5		Blas Roca Calderio (1908–1987)	22 April 1934	13 August 1939	5 years, 113 days	2nd	
General Secretary of the Central Committee of the Communist Revolutionary Union (1939–1944)
5		Blas Roca Calderio (1908–1987)	13 August 1939	22 January 1944	4 years, 162 days		
General Secretary of the Central Committee of the Popular Socialist Party (1944–1961)
5		Blas Roca Calderio (1908–1987)	22 January 1944	24 June 1961	17 years, 92 days		
First Secretary of the Central Committee of the Integrated Revolutionary Organizations (1961–1962)
6		Fidel Castro (1926–2016)	26 July 1961	26 March 1962	243 days		
First Secretary of the Central Committee of the United Party of the Socialist Revolution of Cuba (1961–1962)
6		Fidel Castro (1926–2016)	26 March 1962	3 October 1965	3 years, 191 days		
First Secretary of the Central Committee of the Communist Party of Cuba (1962–present)
6		Fidel Castro (1926–2016)	3 October 1965	19 April 2011	49 years, 24 days	PROV	
6		Fidel Castro (1926–2016)	3 October 1965	19 April 2011	49 years, 24 days	1st	
6		Fidel Castro (1926–2016)	3 October 1965	19 April 2011	49 years, 24 days	2nd	
6		Fidel Castro (1926–2016)	3 October 1965	19 April 2011	49 years, 24 days	3rd	
6		Fidel Castro (1926–2016)	3 October 1965	19 April 2011	49 years, 24 days	4th	
6		Fidel Castro (1926–2016)	3 October 1965	19 April 2011	49 years, 24 days	5th	
7		Raúl Castro (born 1931)	19 April 2011	19 April 2021	10 years	6th	
7		Raúl Castro (born 1931)	19 April 2011	19 April 2021	10 years	7th	
7		Raúl Castro (born 1931)	19 April 2011	19 April 2021	10 years	8th	
8		Miguel Díaz-Canel (born 1960)	19 April 2021	Incumbent	5 years, 197 days	8th	

== See also ==
- List of political parties in Cuba
- Politburo of the Communist Party of Cuba
- Secretariat of the Communist Party of Cuba
- President of Cuba
- Prime Minister of Cuba
- Cuba under Fidel Castro
