= Asela de los Santos =

Cuban revolutionary and educator (1929–2020)

Minister of Education
- In office 1976–1984
- Appointed by: Raúl Castro
- President: Fidel Castro

Deputy Minister of Education
- In office 1974–1976
- Appointed by: Raúl Castro
- President: Fidel Castro
- Preceded by: Position established

Personal details
- Born: 10 September 1929 Santiago de Cuba, Cuba
- Died: 23 January 2020 (aged 90) Havana, Cuba
- Party: Communist Party of Cuba
- Spouse: José Ramón Fernández
- Education: University of Oriente (Cuba)
- Awards: Order of Playa Girón

Military service
- Allegiance: Republic of Cuba
- Branch/service: Cuban Revolutionary Army, Cuban Revolutionary Armed Forces
- Years of service: 1953–1970
- Rank: Captain
- Battles/wars: Cuban Revolution

Asela de los Santos Tamayo (10 September 1929 – 23 January 2020) was a Cuban teacher, revolutionary leader and politician. She was a cofounder and the secretary general of the Federation of Cuban Women (FMC). She served as Deputy Minister, then First Minister of Education in the government of the Communist Party of Cuba.

== Early life ==
De los Santos was born on 10 September 1929 in Santiago de Cuba, Cuba.

De los Santos studied to became a teacher at the University of Oriente (now known as the University of Santiago de Cuba).

As a student, de los Santos became politically active against the U.S. aligned Fulgencio Batista dictatorship.

== Revolutionary activity ==
After the 1953 attack on the Moncada Barracks by the 26th of July Movement, which sparked the Cuban Revolution, de los Santos joined the Cuban Revolutionary Army. She helped the surviving fighters from the Moncada Barracks action and taught soldiers to read.

In November 1956, de los Santos was one of the organisers of an armed action in Santiago de Cuba, then in 1957 transported fighters to join Fidel Castro in the Sierra Maestra mountain range with fellow revolutionaries Celia Sánchez and Vilma Espín.

At the 2012 Havana Book Fair, de los Santos said of this time that:

"There, in the mountains and in the underground groups, equality and fraternity, solidarity and friendship, truth and justice, work, generosity, and respect for human dignity prevailed over the mediocrity, pettiness, selfishness and prejudices of all types that were imposed by the times of slavery, rooted in mind and behaviour by centuries of colonial rule."

== Governmental roles ==
After the victory of the Cuban Revolution, de los Santos took responsibility for education in all of the Oriente province. From 1966 to 1970, she was director of education for the Cuban Revolutionary Armed Forces, holding the rank of Captain and organising the education of both rural children in reopened local schools and all illiterate soldiers in combatant study groups.

De los Santos was one of the founder members of the Communist Party of Cuba, served on the Party Central Committee for three terms (1975–1991) and was appointed by Raúl Castro to serve as the Deputy Minister of Education in 1974, then as Minister of Education in 1979. In these roles she played a central part in the national Cuban Literacy Program and met with Ethiopian Minister of Education, Goshu Wolde, when he led a delegation in 1979 to study Cuban teaching methods.

With Espín, de los Santos was a cofounder of the Federation of Cuban Women (FMC), established in 1960, and served as the general secretary of the organisation. In 1960, when sugar mills and cane fields were under attack across Cuba shortly before the Bay of Pigs invasion, the Federation of Cuban Women created the Emergency Medical Response Brigades to mobilize women against counter-revolution. She was also a member of the national leadership of the Association of Combatants of the Cuban Revolution (ACRC).

In January 1966, de los Santos attended the Tricontinental Conference of African, Asian, and Latin American Peoples in Havana, Cuba.

== Marriage ==
De los Santos married José Ramón Fernández, a fellow founding member of the Communist Party of Cuba and the commander of Cuban defences during the Bay of Pigs invasion in April 1961. He was awarded the title of Hero of the Republic of Cuba. She was widowed in 2019.

== Later life ==
When her comrade Espín died in 2007, de los Santos spoke at her funeral.

In 2009, de los Santos was awarded with the Order of Playa Girón.

After the death of Fidel Castro in 2016, Raúl Castro appointed her as the Honorary Chair for the Study of the Thought and Work of Fidel Castro, which aimed to "promote the legacy" of the former Cuban leader.

== Death ==
De los Santos died on 23 January 2020 in Havana, aged 90. Her funeral was presided over by Raúl Castro, then First Secretary of the Communist Party of Cuba, and Miguel Díaz-Canel Bermúdez, President of the Republic of Cuba. Her ashes were interred at the Veterans Pantheon in the Colón Necrópolis in Vedado, Havana.
