= Rubén Martínez Puente =

Cuban military officer (died 2021)

Rubén Martínez Puente (1941/2 – 24 July 2021) was a Cuban military officer and politician.

He served as the Chief of the Cuban Revolutionary Air and Air Defense Force from 1998 to 2005 and politician who served in the National Assembly of People's Power from 2013 to 2018 as a member of the Communist Party of Cuba.

Puente died from COVID-19 in 2021 aged 79, during the COVID-19 pandemic in Cuba.
