= Concepción Campa Huergo =

Cuban medical researcher

Concepción Campa Huergo (born 1951) is a Cuban medical researcher. She was the lead scientist in the development of VA-MENGOC-BC, the first vaccine against meningitis B, in 1989. For this work she received the World Intellectual Property Organization gold medal. She was subsequently elected to the 5th Politburo of the Communist Party of Cuba in 1997.
