= Carlos Baliño =

Cuban writer (1848–1926)

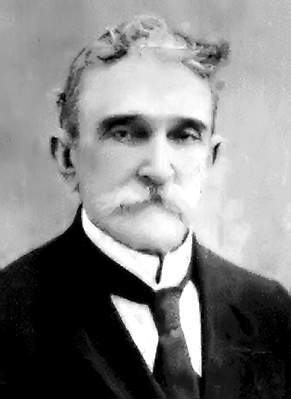
Carlos Baliño

Carlos Benigno Baliño López (13 February 1848 – 18 June 1926) was a Cuban writer, revolutionary and one of the first proponents of Marxism in Cuba.

He was born on 13 February 1848 in Guanajay, Cuba.

His early writings were poetry and prose. By 1869 his writings had gained notability for their anti-colonial and pro-independence inclinations; thus placing him at odds with the colonial authorities. He was forced into exile and lived in New Orleans, Louisiana, where he studied architecture.

In 1892, while living in the United States he, along with Jose Martí, founded the Cuban Revolutionary Party.

In 1902, a year after the United States signed the Platt Amendment, Baliño returned to Cuba. While in Cuba he began to write more often, appearing in El Mundo and El Proletario, among other publications. In 1905 he published Bases Fundamentales (Principal Bases).

In his writings Baliño addressed the position of the proletariat, the question of political power and argued for the creation of a classless society based on the socialization of the means of production. From the early 1900s he gradually moved towards Marxism.

In 1906, he signed the charter of the Socialist Party of Cuba, which emerged from the consolidation of the Socialist Workers' Party and the International Socialist Group, also created with his contribution. Being a member of the Socialist Group of Havana, in 1910 he came to take his presidency replacing Ramón Belmonte, after the most prominent workers in the Havana Sewerage Strike were expelled from the country.

Baliño edited various Socialist newspapers and in 1925 was amongst the founders of the Communist Party of Cuba.

He was an early critic of neocolonialism and wrote the prologue and translation to Scott Nearing's 1921 anti-imperialist work, The American Empire.

Baliño died on 18 June 1926 in Havana.
