= Julio Camacho Aguilera =

Cuban politician (1924–2024)

Minister of Transport
- In office January 1959 – 17 May 1961
- Preceded by: position established
- Succeeded by: Omar Fernández Cañizares

Personal details
- Born: 7 March 1924; Rafael Freyre, Cuba
- Died: 14 December 2024 (aged 100); Cuba
- Political party: PPC-O (until 1952); PCC
- Education: University of Pinar del Río (honorary)
- Occupation: Military officer

Julio Camacho Aguilera (7 March 1924 – 14 December 2024) was a Cuban military officer and politician. A member of the Communist Party, he served as Minister of Transport from 1959 to 1961.

Camacho died in Cuba on 14 December 2024, at the age of 100.
