= Armando Acosta Cordero =

Cuban military and guerrilla warfare

- Born: 15 November 1920; Taguasco, Cuba
- Died: 5 October 2009
- Organization: Communist Party of Cuba

Armando Acosta Cordero (15 November 1920, in Taguasco – 5 October 2009, in Havana), known as Captain Erasmo Rodríguez, was a commander of the Cuban Rebel Army. From a very young age he participated in the struggle, with the Popular Socialist Party. Cordero joined the Rebel Army in the Sierra Maestra and later joined Column 8 Ciro Redondo with which he contributed to liberate, different towns as well as his hometown.

== Biography ==
Armando was born on 15 November 1920, in the town of Taguasco (located in the current central province of Sancti Spíritus) .

=== Revolutionary Path ===
From a very young age, he participated in the struggle. He was a labor leader in the Central Tuinicú, in Sancti Spíritus, and a commander of the Popular Socialist Party in the old province of Villa Clara.

He joined the Rebel Army in the Sierra Maestra. He later joined Column No. 8 Ciro Redondo, where he participated in several combats under the command of Commander Ernesto Che Guevara. He helped liberate his hometown, among other things.

=== Captain Erasmo Rodríguez ===
At that time Armando Acosta was not known by this name, but by Captain Erasmo Rodríguez, a war name by which he was identified, since his real name, belonged to one of the fighters with more prominent communist ideas of the old Las Villas province. The rank of captain was obtained during the invasion campaign in Villareño territory.

=== Liberation of the city of Sancti Spíritus ===
In Sancti Spíritus the rumor spread that Che Guevara and Camilo Cienfuegos accompanied by someone named Juana de Arcos, who wanted to avenge his family murdered by the dictatorship - they came to take the city. Commander Ernesto Che Guevara ordered Armando Acosta to harass Sancti Spíritus: "You throw a few shivers at the barracks and then you retreat."

=== Liberation of Jatibonico ===
Days later, in late December 1958, while he was in Jatibonico carrying out the orders of the General Command, Captain Armando Acosta Cordero ―leader of Group No. 1 Platoon 6 of Column No. 8 Ciro Redondo―, and Lieutenant Güil (Wilfredo Alcaga) ordered the attack and the taking of Jatibonico.

=== Responsibilities ===
With the victory of the Cuban Revolution, in January 1959 the revolutionary administration was established in Jatibonico.

=== Death ===
He died in Havana on 5 October, 2009, at the age of 88. At his will, his remains were cremated and his ashes were deposited in the Mausoleum of the Front of Las Villas, in the city of Santa Clara.
