= Osmany Cienfuegos =

Cuban politician (1931–2025)

- Born: 4 February 1931; Cuba
- Died: 17 May 2025 (aged 94)
- Education: University of Havana
- Occupation: Politician
- Relatives: Camilo Cienfuegos (brother)

Osmany Cienfuegos Gorriarán (4 February 1931 – 17 May 2025) was a Cuban politician and older brother of Camilo Cienfuegos. He served in various roles in the Cuban government.

== Life and career ==
Cienfuegos was the only one of three brothers who attended the University of Havana, where he graduated as an architect in 1954. He joined the Popular Socialist Party (Partido Socialista Popular, PSP). He was exiled to Mexico in 1957 and remained there until 1959. After his brother's death, he was chosen to be the Minister of Construction in 1960. After the foundation of the Communist Party of Cuba in 1965, Cienfuegos was chosen as the president of the Foreign Affairs Committee of the PCC Central Committee. He played a key role in implementing Cuban policies toward Africa in the 1960s, such as the intervention in the Congo in 1965. In 1966, he was appointed Secretary General of the Organization of Solidarity of the Peoples of Asia, Africa, and Latin America (OSPAAAL).

He was removed from the Politburo of the Party and the Council of State after 17 years of membership (1980–1987). He remained as a member of the Central Committee of the Cuban Communist Party and in the 1990s was appointed Minister of Tourism until he was replaced in 1999.

He was a Vice-president of the Council of Ministers of Cuba until 2 March 2009. His departure caused controversy after some news reports suggested that he had been removed by Cuba's president, Raúl Castro. Fidel Castro responded criticising those reports.

Cuban dissident Armando Valladares has alleged that he was responsible for at least nine extrajudicial killings by asphyxiating political opponents.

Cienfuegos died on 17 May 2025, at the age of 94.

== Sources ==
- Cuban Transition Project bio
