= Juan Almeida Bosque =

Cuban politician (1927–2009)

- Almeida in 1963
- Born: 17 February 1927; Havana, Cuba
- Died: 11 September 2009 (aged 82); Havana, Cuba
- Political party: Communist Party of Cuba

Juan Almeida Bosque (17 February 1927 – 11 September 2009) was a Cuban politician and one of the original commanders of the insurgent forces in the Cuban Revolution. After the rebels took power in 1959, he was a prominent figure in the Communist Party of Cuba. At the time of his death, he was a Vice-President of the Cuban Council of State and was its third ranking member. He received several decorations, and national and international awards, including the title of "Hero of the Republic of Cuba" and the Order of Máximo Gómez.

== Early life and revolution ==
Almeida was born in Havana. He left school at the age of eleven and became a bricklayer. He was born in a poor family. He became close friend of the revolutionary Fidel Castro and in March 1953 joined the anti-Batista movement. On 26 July 1953 he joined Fidel and his brother Raúl Castro in the attack on the Moncada Barracks in Santiago de Cuba. He was arrested and imprisoned with the Castro brothers in the Isle of Pines Prison. During the amnesty of 15 May 1955, he was released and transferred to Mexico.

Almeida returned to Cuba with the Castro brothers, Che Guevara and 78 other revolutionaries on the Granma expedition and was one of just 12 who survived the initial landing. Almeida is often credited with shouting "No one here gives up!" (alternatively "here, nobody surrenders") to Guevara, which would become a slogan of the Cuban revolution, although the words were actually spoken by Camilo Cienfuegos. Almeida was also reputed to be a good marksman. Following the landing, Almeida continued to fight Fulgencio Batista's government forces in the guerilla war in the Sierra Maestra mountain range. In 1958, he was promoted to Commander and head of the Santiago Column of the Revolutionary Army. During the revolution, as a black man in a prominent position, he served as a symbol for Afro-Cubans of the rebellion's break with Cuba's discriminatory past.

== Post-revolution ==
After the success of the Cuban revolution in January 1959, Almeida commanded large parts of the Revolutionary Armed Forces of Cuba. As a major during the Bay of Pigs Invasion in April 1961, he headed of the Central Army with headquarters in Santa Clara, Cuba. Later he was promoted to general, chosen as a member of the central committee and political bureau, and held a number of other government positions.

He was honoured with the title of Commander of the Revolution and at the time of his death was one of just three living holders of that title, the others being Guillermo García and Ramiro Valdés.

In 1998, Fidel Castro named Almeida a "Hero of the Republic of Cuba". Almeida also headed the National Association of Veterans and Combatants of the Revolution. He authored several books, including the popular trilogy Military prison, Exile and Disembarkation. He was also a songwriter and one of his songs, "Dame un traguito" (English: "Give me a Sip"), was popular in Cuba for several years.

== Death ==
Almeida died of a heart attack on 11 September 2009. On 13 September, a memorial ceremony was held in the Plaza de la Revolución in Havana and several others were held across Cuba. A national day of mourning was declared, with flags flown at half mast. Fidel Castro, who had not been seen in public since resigning as president in 2008, sent a wreath that was placed alongside one from Raúl Castro. Other senior government and Communist Party members also attended.

Internationally, there were several tributes. The President of Vietnam, Nguyễn Minh Triết, sent a message describing Almeida as a great friend of the Vietnamese people who contributed to the ties of solidarity between the two nations. The Secretary of the Colombian Communist Party expressed his condolences. In Moscow, a musical homage was staged and a collection of Almeida's songs entitled "El Bolero Cubano" (Cuban Ballads) was scheduled for release for the first time in Russian.

Almeida did not want his body to lie in state. He was given a military funeral at a mausoleum in the mountains in Cruce de los Baños near Santiago de Cuba, an area in which he had fought during the revolution.

In 2013, a mural relief portrait of Almeida was installed on the façade of the Teatro Heredia in Santiago de Cuba. The sculpture was designed by Enrique Ávila González, creator of the portraits of Che Guevara and Camilo Cienfuegos located in the Plaza de la Revolución in Havana, and includes the quotation "Aqui no se rinde nadie" (Here no one gives up).

== Books about him ==
- His family's reflections about his political activity was gathered via personal conversations and late on published by Luis Baez and Pedro de la Hoz as a book after his death.

=== Allegation ===
A book published in 2005 alleged without proof that the Kennedy administration had Almeida for a key role in a plot run called AMWORLD or C-Day to remove Castro and set to launch on 1 December 1963. U.S. Congressional investigator and later JFK assassination conspiracy theorist Lamar Waldron, in his 2013 book, The Hidden History of the JFK Assassination maintains throughout that General Juan Almeida was a willing participant in a planned, 1 December 1963 anti-Castro uprising in Cuba, called the JFK-Almeida plan. AMWORLD was, according to Waldron, a Mafia-CIA Castro assassination plot run by Richard Helms of the CIA and done without JFK's or RFK's knowledge. Almeida's motivation was disillusionment with Castro's dictatorship having abandoned the ideals of the Cuban Revolution. It contended the plot was managed by Robert F. Kennedy and aborted by John F. Kennedy's assassination in November 1963.

== Sources ==
- Castro, Fidel, with Ramonet, Ignacio. 2007. My Life ISBN 1-4165-5328-2
- Fernandez, Jose Ramon. 2001. Playa Giron/Bay of Pigs: Washington's First Military Defeat in the Americas. Pathfinder ISBN 0-87348-925-X ISBN 978-0-87348-925-6
- Franqui, Carlos. 1984. Family Portrait with Fidel. ISBN 0-394-72620-0 ISBN 978-0-394-72620-5
- Rodriguez, Juan Carlos. 1999. Bay of Pigs and the CIA. Ocean Press. ISBN 1-875284-98-2
- Thomas, Hugh. 1998. Cuba: The Pursuit of Freedom. Da Capo Press. ISBN 0-306-80827-7
- Almeida Lives Today More Than Ever by Fidel Castro, Monthly Review, 13 September 2009
