= Raúl Valdés Vivó =

Cuban diplomat, journalist and writer (1929–2013)

- Raúl Valdés Vivó, Cuban diplomat and writer

Cuban Ambassador to Cambodia and the NLF of South Vietnam
- In office 1967–1975

Head of the International Relations Department of the PCC Central Committee

Rector of the Ñico López Party School

Personal details
- Born: September 21, 1929 Mariel, Cuba
- Died: November 9, 2013 (aged 84) Havana, Cuba
- Party: Popular Socialist Party; Communist Party of Cuba

Raúl Valdés Vivó (September 21, 1929 – November 9, 2013) was a Cuban diplomat, politician, journalist, and author. A prominent cadre of the Cuban revolutionary movement, he served as the first and only foreign ambassador accredited to the National Liberation Front of South Vietnam (Viet Cong) and the Provisional Revolutionary Government of the Republic of South Vietnam residing continuously inside the Indochinese jungle during the Vietnam War.

He later served as Head of the General Department of Foreign Relations of the Central Committee of the Communist Party of Cuba (PCC) and rector of the Ñico López Party School.

== Biography ==
=== Early activism and clandestine journalism ===
Valdés Vivó joined the socialist youth organization of the Popular Socialist Party (PSP) in 1946. That same year, he started writing for the youth magazine Mella, which he directed clandestinely during the dictatorship of Fulgencio Batista. He contributed to the magazine Última Hora and suffered imprisonment for his revolutionary activities.

Between 1957 and 1959, he attended the International Lenin School in Moscow. Following the 1959 Cuban Revolution, he directed a national radio newscast and became deputy editor of the newspaper Hoy until it merged into Granma in 1965. He published articles in magazines including Bohemia, Verde Olivo, Cuba Socialista, and Unión.

=== Diplomatic mission and the "Jungle Embassy" ===
Raúl Valdés Vivó and Marta Rojas, Cuba's first war correspondents in Vietnam.

Raúl Valdés Vivó presenting credentials as Cuban ambassador in the Vietnamese jungle.

In 1965, he traveled to the combat zones of South Vietnam representing the Cuban Committee for Solidarity with South Vietnam. In 1966, he toured North Vietnam and areas controlled by the Pathet Lao in Laos. In 1967, he testified regarding military escalation at the Russell Tribunal in Stockholm.

Appointed ambassador to the Kingdom of Cambodia in June 1967, he was based in Phnom Penh. On March 4, 1969, he presented his credentials to the National Liberation Front and the Provisional Revolutionary Government in a small wooden cabin deep within the jungle of Tây Ninh province, near the border with Cambodia. Valdés Vivó was the sole foreign ambassador to operate an official diplomatic mission permanently based inside the liberated jungle areas.

Alongside war correspondent Marta Rojas, he published dispatches on the conflict. Later in his career, he authored documentary accounts on the secret deployment of Cuban construction and engineering instructors to build portions of the Ho Chi Minh Trail following agreements between Fidel Castro, Pham Van Dong, and General Vo Nguyen Giap in 1973.

=== Political and academic career ===
Upon returning to Cuba, he headed the Foreign Relations Department of the Central Committee of the Communist Party of Cuba, overseeing diplomatic ties with international national liberation movements in Africa, Asia, and Latin America. He subsequently served as rector of the PCC Higher School «Ñico López», leading research in sociology and political economy.

== Selected bibliography ==
- Relatos de Vietnam del Sur (1966, co-authored with Marta Rojas)
- Reports from South Viet Nam (1967)
- Embajada en la selva y antes: paralelo 17 (1969)
- Los negros ciegos (1971)
- La brigada y el mutilado (1974)
- Naranjas en Saigón (play, 1977)
- Angola: fin del mito de los mercenarios (1978; English translation: Angola: End of the Mercenary Myth, 1978)
- Ethiopia: The Unknown Revolution (1978)
- Reacción disociativa (1986)
- Una gota en el torrente: escalinata, selva y desierto (2000)
- El gran secreto del 11 de septiembre (2002)
- El gran secreto: cubanos en el camino de Ho Chi Minh
