= Blas Roca Calderio =

Cuban politician

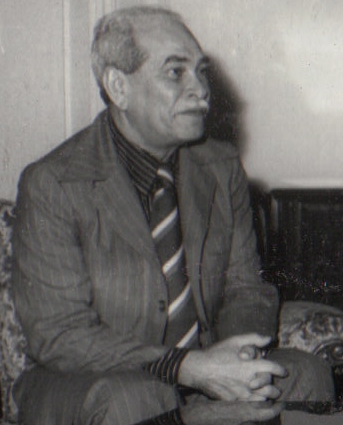
- Roca in 1979

President of the National Assembly of People's Power
- In office 2 December 1976 – 1981
- Vice President: Raúl Roa García
- Preceded by: None
- Succeeded by: Flavio Bravo Pardo

General Secretary of the Central Committee of the Popular Socialist Party
- In office April 1934 – 24 June 1961
- Preceded by: Jorge Vivó
- Succeeded by: Fidel Castro

Personal details
- Born: 24 July 1908 Manzanillo, Cuba
- Died: 25 April 1987 (aged 78) Havana, Cuba
- Party: Popular Socialist Party (1929–1961); 26th of July Movement (1953–1965); Communist Party of Cuba (1965–1981)
- Profession: Lawyer

Blas Roca Calderio (24 July 1908 – 25 April 1987) was a Cuban politician and Marxist theorist who served as President of the National Assembly of People's Power from 1976 to 1981. He was also general secretary of the pre-1959 revolution Communist Party of Cuba for 28 years and editor of the communist newspaper Hoy. He was a signatory of the 1940 Constitution of Cuba, and chaired the committee that wrote the country's first socialist constitution in 1976.

== Biography ==
Blas Roca, born Francisco Wilfredo Calderío López in Manzanillo, left school at the age of 11 and began shining shoes to help support his poor family. He changed his name to Roca, meaning 'rock', after he joined the Communist Party in 1929.

In 1929, he was elected Secretary General of the Union of Shoemakers of Manzanillo. In August 1931 he was elected to the Central Committee of the Communist Party and appointed head of his organization in the east. During this stage he displayed significant journalistic activity in the labor press and led popular protests that culminated in the historic general strike of August 1933, which overthrew the Machado dictatorship.

Blas Roca was called to the capital at a time when the party needed a strong guiding direction, and replaced the party leader and poet Rubén Martínez Villena, who would make his last public appearance in September 1933 at the burial of fellow communist Julio Antonio Mella. Thus, at 26 years of age, Blas had become the leader of the Cuban communists and would remain so until the triumph of the Cuban Revolution. He is credited for shifting the party from an ultra left sect to an influential national organization.

In August 1935, Blas Roca attended the 7th Congress of the Communist International in Moscow, where Georgi Dimitrov outlined what became the new popular front strategy. Roca was instrumental in adapting the popular front to Cuban conditions. Originally identifying Fulgencio Batista with fascism, in 1938 at the Party's Tenth Plenary Assembly in Havana, Blas Roca told the party leaders that circumstances had changed and Batista "ceased to be the leading figure in the reactionary camp." According to K.S. Karol (Guerrillas in Power), Blas explained the threat of an economic and political crisis had split the Cuban right into two camps: the fascists, who favored brute force to solve the crisis on the backs of the people, and the Batista forces, who favored reforms and dialogue.

An alliance with the Batista forces led to the legalization of the communist-led Confederation of Cuban Workers (CTC), the party daily newspaper Hoy and the party itself, then known as the Unión Revolucionaria Comunista (Revolutionary Communist Union). The alliance continued into the Constituent Assembly elections of 1939 in which the communists elected 6 delegates, led by Roca and Juan Marinello. Roca would serve 12 years in the legislature. The resulting Cuban Constitution of 1940, with Blas Roca as one of the signers, embodied many progressive and socialist provisions. In the following presidential election, the communists supported Batista's candidacy as part of his Democratic Socialist Coalition. Years later, when Batista accused Fidel Castro's revolutionaries of being communist-led, Castro reminded readers of the magazine Bohemia that Batista had been endorsed by the communists in 1940 and that former party members were then serving in the Batista government.

In the 1930s, Roca's communist party also organized support for the Spanish Republic during the Spanish Civil War, with a formidable campaign that included not only moral and material assistance but also sending about a thousand Cuban combatants to the International Brigades.

Under Blas Roca's direction, Cuba's communist party grew in size and influence with key control over trade unions and other support organizations. During World War II, two communists served in Batista's war-time cabinet as ministers without portfolio, Carlos Rafael Rodriguez and Juan Marinello, both of whom would later serve in top positions under Fidel Castro. The party operated a popular radio station, Radio Mil Diez, and membership was in the tens of thousands.

The party's influence grew tremendously during the Second World War as the United States and Cuba were allied with the Soviet Union. Support for the party was strongest among Cuban intellectuals and artists, and counted among its members and sympathizers such notable Cubans as the novelist Alejo Carpentier, the poet Juan Marinello, who served as the party's chair, the painter Wifredo Lam, the national poet Nicolás Guillén, the writers Félix Pita Rodríguez, Mirta Aguirre, and Pablo de la Torriente Brau, and the economists Jacinto Torres and Raúl Cepero Bonilla. As Tad Szulc wrote in his biography of Fidel Castro about the Cuban communists, "In truth, there were few creative personalities in Cuba since 1930 who were not on the left, or the extreme left"

During the 1940s, the Cuban communists renamed the Popular Socialist Party (PSP) followed the lead of Earl Browder, then-Chairman of the Communist Party USA. Following the Second World War, as tensions between the U.S. and the Soviet Union intensified, the world communist movement condemned Browderism as a form of class collaboration and revisionism. The Cuban party, which under Roca's leadership had hewed closest to the Browder positions, such as forming a broad democratic alliance pushing policies to the left, denounced Browder and his views while remaining loyal to Stalinist principles.

The party weakened under the anti-communist Carlos Prío Socarrás administration but condemned Batista's coup of March 10, 1952. After Fidel Castro's July 26, 1953 attack on the Moncada army barracks, the Cuban communists condemned the attack as a "putsch" which did not involve mass struggle. At the time of the Moncada attack, party leaders were involved in a clandestine conference in Santiago and were also celebrating Roca's birthday (July 24). Batista quickly blamed the communist party for the "criminal incident."

As the party's ability to operate openly was blocked, key leaders began to rethink their attitude towards Fidel Castro's 26th of July Movement and the strategy of armed struggle. During the 1950s, the party went underground, and Blas Roca spent a year living in China in 1955-1956. Returning to Cuba with the victory of the revolution, Roca reorganized the party and firmly reoriented it under the leadership of Castro. In fact, Roca praised Castro for his armed strategy and criticized the party for failing to prepare for armed struggle. Blas Roca told the Eighth National Assembly of the PSP in August 1960:

″We rightly foresaw, and greatly looked forward to, the prospect that in response to conditions created by the tyranny, the masses would organize and eventually engage in armed struggle or popular insurrection. But for a long time we failed to take any practical steps to hasten that prospect, because we believed that these struggles, including a prolonged general strike, would culminate in armed insurrection quite spontaneously. Hence, we did not prepare, did not organize or train armed detachments.... That was our mistake. Fidel Castro's historical merit is that he prepared, trained, and assembled the fighting elements needed to begin and carry on armed struggle as a means of destroying the tyranny.″

Under Roca's leadership the Cuban communists were instrumental in providing an organizational and ideological structure for Castro's socialist revolution as well as playing a pivotal role using the party's long-standing ties with the Soviet Union to promote increasingly closer ties during the early days of the revolution. In 1961, Blas Roca, leading a party delegation, presented a Cuban flag to Nikita Khrushchev during a meeting of the Communist Party of the Soviet Union.

Shortly afterwards the communists dissolved into the Integrated Revolutionary Organizations, along with the 26th of July Movement and the Directorio Revolucionario, with communists holding at least 10 of the 24 National Directorate positions. Roca served on the first central committee and politburo of the new Communist Party of Cuba founded in 1965.

Roca also served from 1976 through 1981 as president of the National Assembly of Popular Power, having chaired the committee that drafted the 1976 Cuban socialist constitution.

His remains were buried in a simple grave near the monument to Cuban independence leader Antonio Maceo just outside Havana.

Roca's son, Vladimiro Roca, was an outspoken dissident and critic of the current Cuban party and government, arrested numerous times for his public activities advocating for democratic reforms.

== Books ==
Roca wrote numerous books, articles and pamphlets before and after the revolution, including The Foundations of Socialism in Cuba, published in 1943. The book was the primary text used in educating communist party militants from the 1940s on. After the triumph of the Cuban Revolution, it was one of the main textbooks used by the Schools of Revolutionary Instruction (Escuelas de Instrucción Revolucionaria) to train leaders and party cadres in the newly-formed Integrated Revolutionary Organizations, the party merging the July 2nd Movement, the Popular Socialist Party and the Revolutionary Directorate, and eventually becoming the new Communist Party of Cuba in 1965.

== Honours and awards ==
=== National honours ===
- Order of Playa Girón (1978)

=== Foreign honours ===
- (Czechoslovakia) Grand Cross of the Order of the White Lion (1961)
- (Soviet Union) Order of Lenin (1978)
- (Soviet Union) Jubilee Medal "In Commemoration of the 100th Anniversary of the Birth of Vladimir Ilyich Lenin" (1978)
- (Soviet Union) Jubilee Medal "Thirty Years of Victory in the Great Patriotic War 1941–1945" (1978)
- (East Germany) Order of Karl Marx (1978)
- (People's Republic of Bulgaria) Order of Georgi Dimitrov (1979)
- (Soviet Union) Order of the October Revolution (1984)
