= Fabio Grobart =

Cuban politician

Fabio Grobart (born Abraham Grobart, Poland, August 30, 1905 – Cuba, 22 October 1994; also known as Antonio Blanco and Abraham Simjovitch) was a Marxist-Leninist revolutionary and politician who played an important role in the 1959 Cuban Revolution that overthrew Fulgencio Batista and led to Fidel Castro's rise to power.

== Biography ==
=== From Poland to Cuba ===
Grobart was born in Białystok, Poland.

Apparently following orders of the Comintern, during the early 1920s he became a founding member of the Cuban Communist Party. After in 1922 entering the Young Communist League of Poland, and additional communist activities he may have been sentenced to death and this may have obliged him to leave Poland to settle in Cuba.

He played an important, though generally undocumented, role in guiding the political leadership of Cuba's 1959 Revolution along a socialist path. Fabio Grobart was one of the founders of the Communist Party in Cuba in 1925, "and for decades served as a party ideologue and the man who introduced Castro at party meetings" (Goering, 2001). Grobart was both a member of the Cuban Communist Party Central Committee and a member of Parliament. According to Boris Kozolchyk Grobart's blunders were at least partially responsible for the outlawing of the Cuban Communist Party in 1948, and resulted in his deportation. In the 1960s, he directed Cuba Socialista and was top planner guiding orthodox ideologogy. As he grew older, he was considered the Party's historian. He died in Cuba on 22 October 1994.

Abraham was a major éminence grise of Cuban history and is most commonly known as Fabio Grobart, Fabio being a reference to the Roman Consul and guerrilla tactician Quintus Fabius Maximus Verrucosus called "Cunctator" (the delayer), and thus to Fabian socialism.

=== Controversies ===
Grobart's actual background is not clearly known and subject to controversy. For instance during the foiled so-called microfaction plot, in which the "old" communists allegedly tried to oust or at least control Castro, Grobart was necessarily involved. But this same source provides no mention of Grobart's actions for or against this very significant plot. Raffy (2004 pp. 383–385) is more specific specifying a somewhat earlier date; this author states that Anibal Escalante, the son of a senior Cuban independence fighter who fought under the command of Calixto Garcia, was blamed for the plot. Raffe credits Grobart with saving Castro. Escalante was exiled to Prague and the USSR ambassador Kondriatsev was sent home from Cuba. Apparently this effort to save Castro was supported by Castro's feared security chief "Barba Roja" Manuel Piñeiro . Those accused of being co-conspirators were imprisoned.

=== Grobart and the Communist Party of Cuba ===
Fabio Grobart was long considered "… maybe the highest ranking representative of the Third International in Cuba in that moment". However, Grobart's importance in founding the Cuban communist party was recognized by Fidel Castro, the Rand thinktank, and Jewish history experts such as Moisés Asís, who states "By 1925, there were 8,000 Jews in Cuba (some 2,700 sephardic, 5,200 ashkenazic, and 100 Americans). Four ashkenazic Jews were in the small group that founded the first Communist Party of Cuba in 1925: Grimberg, Vasserman, Simjovich a.k.a. Grobart, and Gurbich. They opposed the religious and community life of the other Jews."

It has been claimed that Grobart recruited Fidel Castro as an agent in 1948

Although the party Grobart helped found was not the first Cuban communist party, it is considered as such by the present Cuban government. The first well known Cuban communist was Paul Lafargue, born in Santiago de Cuba in 1847. Lafargue went to Europe, became a disciple of Karl Marx, married one of Marx's daughters, became a very important member of the Socialist Internationals, and helped found the French Workers Party in 1882. Lafargue and his wife committed suicide. The original Cuban Communist Party seems to have arisen early in the 20th century in the eastern town of Manzanillo.

== Family and personality ==
Fabio Grobart had a son (still living and not an only child) Fabio Grobart Sunshine born August 31, PhD in International Economics & MS Chemical Engineering.

Fabio Grobart was ethnically "Jewish," and may not have been a practicing Jew. He apparently never objected to the Cuban government's "attitude toward religion, Zionism and Israel..."

== Official history ==
Official Cuban government histories state that Grobart left Poland after joining the Communist Youth League, and for this reason was condemned to death. His first job in Cuba was as a tailors' assistant and rapidly became active in Cuban unions. Directed to do so by the Cuban communist party he funded the corresponding communist youth league. Although it is public record that Gerard Machado often turned to the communist party for support, officially Grobart was arrested by Machado officials and did not return until this President, turned dictator, fell from power. Some time before 1943, Grobart resumed union activities during Fulgencio Batista's first period of power. According to this official history, since his lungs were weak and his life was again threatened in the 1950s when he left for Eastern Europe to spend time between Budapest, Prague, and Vienna. In 1952, under the name Albert Blanco he was co-delegate with Carlos Palacio a Spaniard for Latin America in the very leftist labor union World Federation of Trade Unions (WFTU). After 1959, Ernesto Che Guevara and Raúl Castro met "Alberto Blanco" in Prague and brought him back to Cuba. In 2005, Raúl Castro's words led Cuban communist authorities in honors and praise to "maestro" Grobart, giving his status as such as well as the official imprimatur of "Marxist sainthood".

== Bibliography ==
- Barron, John 1974 KGB: The Secret Work of Soviet Secret Agents. Readers Digests Press, New York ISBN 0-88349-009-9 pp. 147–151
- Grobart, Fabio 1985 Un Forjador Eternamente Joven, Havana, Editorial Gente
- Grobart, Fabio 1981 (accessed 5-10-07) De la vida del partido. El proceso de formación del Partido Comunista de Cuba, condensed by communist party from an article in: Cuba Socialista 1981 (1 diciembre). https://web.archive.org/web/20070607181414/http://www.cubasocialista.cu/texto/cs0176.htm
- Grobart, Fabio 1979 in MARINELLO, Juan) VARIOS; Juan Marinello: recopilación de textos sobre ... - (Raúl Castro, Fabio Grobart, Vicentina Antuña, Imeldo Alvarez, Eduardo E. López Morales, Cintio Vitier, Samuel Feijóo, Jorge Mañach, y otros) - La Habana,1979
- Grobart, F, 1974 Prólogo, In: Mella, JA, Escritos Revolucionarios, Mexico D.F., Siglo Veintiuno, 1978, pp. 23-. The Agrupación Comunista de La Habana had been founded in 1923
- Grobart, Fabio 1975 The Cuban working class movement from 1925–1933. Science and Society 29 (Spring 75), 73-102
- Grobart, F, 1974 Prólogo, In: Nuñez Machin, Ana.- 1974 Rubén Martínez Villena. Incluye en apéndice amplia antología en prosa y verso. Editorial Ciencias Sociales, La Habana. 2ªed.

Hudson, Rex A. 1988 and José F. Sánchez 2005 (accessed 1-14-07) Castro's America Department. Coordinating Cuba's support for Marxist–Leninist violence in the Americas. La Nueva Cuba Octubre 30, 2005 "After taking control of the DGI, the KGB compelled Castro to replace its chief, Manuel Piñeiro, with José Méndez Cominches in 1969. (26) One theory posited that the Soviets had not forgiven Piñeiro, a Castro loyalist, for thwarting a KGB plot -in collusion with a pro-Soviet "microfaction" of the PCC/CC- to oust Castro in early 1968 and replace him with a party member more amenable to Moscow's orders. (27) Nevertheless, Castro kept Piñeiro in his other position as MININT vice minister, and also gave him supervisory control over the 400-member DL staff.

- Gerardo Peraza, a former DGI official who defected in 1971, affirmed that the Soviets had "allowed Castro to take Manuel Piñeiro away and name him head of the Department of Liberation, and the intelligence service remained under the orders of Colonel Simonov." (28) Peraza added that the Soviets tried to "bolster Fidel Castro's ego" by giving him "the power or the freedom to work against the Latin American countries, such as Nicaragua, El Salvador.""

Inter-American Commission on Human Rights (Organization of American States)1983 (accessed 1-14-06) The situation of human rights in Cuba seventh report OEA/Ser.L/V/II.61 Doc. 29 rev. 1 4 October 1983 "Since the defeat and imprisonment in 1968 of the so-called "microfaction" within the Cuban Communist Party, led by Anibal Escalante, there has been no effective opposition to political power in Cuba."

- Kozolchyk, Boris 1966 (last accessed 1-14-07) The political biographies of three Castro officials. Memorandum RM-4994-RC
- Latin American Election Statistics: A Guide to Sources, (accessed 1-14-07) Social Sciences Library. University of California, San Diego.
- Staff, New York Times (October 24, 1994). "Fabio Grobart, Veteran Cuban Communist, 89. Obit". The New York Times.
- Raffy, Serge 2004 Castro, el desleal (Castro the Deceitful) Aguilar Mexico D. F. ISBN 1-59820-584-6, ISBN 978-1-59820-584-8
