= Ramiro Valdés Menéndez =

Cuban revolutionary and politician (1932–2026)

- Valdés in the 1960s

Vice President of the Council of State of Cuba
- In office 20 December 2009 – 10 October 2019
- President: Miguel Díaz-Canel; Raul Castro

Minister of the Interior of Cuba
- In office March 1979 – 1985
- President: Fidel Castro
- Preceded by: Sergio del Valle Jiménez
- Succeeded by: José Abrahantes Fernández
- In office 6 June 1961 – January 1968
- President: Fidel Castro
- Preceded by: Position established
- Succeeded by: Sergio del Valle Jiménez

Personal details
- Born: 28 April 1932 Artemisa, Cuba
- Died: 21 June 2026 (aged 94) Havana, Cuba
- Party: Communist Party of Cuba
- Spouse: Alicia Alonso Becerra
- Profession: Military and politician

Ramiro Valdés Menéndez (28 April 1932 – 21 June 2026) was a Cuban politician and revolutionary. He became a vice president in the 2009 Cuban government dismissals.

== Background ==
Valdés was born on 28 April 1932 in Artemisa, then part of Pinar del Río Province. A veteran of the Cuban Revolution, he fought alongside Fidel Castro at the attack on the Moncada Barracks in 1953 and was a founding member of the 26th of July Movement. He was one of the revolutionaries on the Granma expedition and one of the 12 who survived the initial landing. He was a member of the Politburo of the Communist Party of Cuba from October 1965 on, and held many important governmental posts, including those of Interior Minister and Vice-Prime Minister. On 31 August 2006, he was named Minister of Informatics and Communications.

In 1960, he was a member of Raúl Castro's delegation that visited Czechoslovakia where he received intelligence training.

He was the father of the Cuban composer Ramiro Valdés Puentes, who was awarded Cuba's First National Prize of Composition, and who currently lives in Miami and in 2004 was the protagonist of a Telemundo 51 news series titled "The Commander's Son".

Valdés Menéndez died in Havana on 21 June 2026, at the age of 94.

== Minister of the Interior ==
By 1969, the Politburo, the former central policy-making and governing body of the Communist Party of Cuba, decided to remove Valdés from the Ministry of the Interior, replacing him with Sergio del Valle Jiménez, a comandante and MINFAR's first deputy minister. In 1978, Fidel Castro removed del Valle Jiménez and brought back Valdés as Minister of the Interior. Expectations for improvement failed and personal rivalries and tensions increased.

By the time of the Third Party Congress in 1986, Valdés was again gone as Minister of the Interior and as a member of the Politburo and it seemed as if his political career was over.

But then, he landed a new job as director of national electronics (Copextel). In the beginning, it was a very small project, but soon it became the hub for the development of Cuba's telecom, software, and IT industry — in growing association with Japanese, Korean, and Chinese enterprises.

The 1990s were Copextel's coming-of-age and also heralded the creation of Cuba's Industrial Group for Electronics, attached to the Ministry of Steel and Machinery (SIME).

Later, this Industrial Group of Electronics came under the Ministry of Information Technology and Communications. In less than 10 years, Valdés's group had become the single most important entity within the new ministry, obviously becoming the man to replace the outgoing minister.

In February 2007, Valdés defended Internet restrictions as a response to United States aggression. The Internet "constitutes one of the tools for global extermination" he said, referring to United States policies, "but is also necessary to continue to advance down the path of development."

At an international conference on communications in Havana, Valdés defended Cuba's "rational and efficient" use of the Internet but warned that "the wild colt of new technologies can and must be controlled."

He was once again readmitted to the Politburo after Raúl Castro's official nomination as President of the Council of State in February 2008.

In February 2010, Valdés, based on declarations from Cuba and Venezuela, visited Venezuela as part of a Cuban delegation that was intended to "help Venezuela reduce energy consumption".

== Retirement ==
In April 2021, it was agreed that Valdés would not rejoin the Central Committee of the Communist Party of Cuba.
