= José Ramón Machado Ventura =

Cuban revolutionary and politician (1930-)

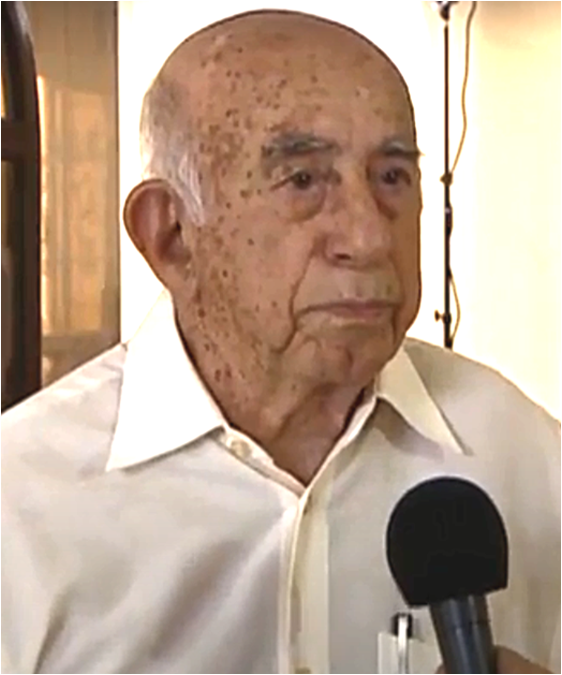
- Ventura in 2019

Second Secretary of the Communist Party of Cuba Central Committee
- In office 19 April 2011 – 19 April 2021
- First Secretary: Raúl Castro; Miguel Diaz-Canel
- Preceded by: Raúl Castro
- Succeeded by: Post Abolished

First Vice President of the Council of State
- In office 24 February 2008 – 24 February 2013
- President: Raúl Castro
- Preceded by: Raúl Castro
- Succeeded by: Miguel Diaz-Canel

Personal details
- Born: 26 October 1930 (age 95) San Antonio de las Vueltas, Cuba
- Party: 26th of July Movement (1955–1962); Communist Party of Cuba (1965–present)
- Education: University of Havana
- Profession: Physician

José Ramón Machado Ventura (born 26 October 1930) is a Cuban revolutionary and politician who was the First Vice President of the Council of State of Cuba from 2008 to 2013. With the election of Raúl Castro as President of the Council of State on 24 February 2008, Machado was elected to succeed him as First Vice President, serving until 2013. He was elected Second Secretary of the Communist Party of Cuba in 2011.

== Biography ==
=== Early life ===
José Ramón Machado was born in San Antonio de las Vueltas, in the former province of Las Villas, and was schooled in Camajuaní and Remedios. He is a medical doctor by profession, graduating from the University of Havana in 1953. Machado joined the revolutionary movement immediately following Fulgencio Batista's coup d'état of 10 March 1952, while still a medical student, and was an early member of the 26th of July Movement opposing the dictatorship. Later, under the command first of Ernesto "Che" Guevara and subsequently of Fidel Castro, he was one of the original revolutionaries who fought the guerrilla war in the Sierra Maestra. In 1958, promoted to the rank of captain, he was sent to the province of Oriente under the command of Raúl Castro as part of the rebels' bid to open up a second front. There he was placed in charge of the guerrillas' medical service, establishing a network of hospitals and dispensaries, and was promoted to the rank of major "comandante" (top rank on Castro's rebel army).

=== After the Cuban Revolution ===
Following the revolutionaries' victory on 1 January 1959, he was appointed the director of medical services in Havana and later served as the national Minister of Health from 1960 to 1967, during which time he was responsible for the development of the country's health sector. In January 1968, reportedly in the aftermath of a personal conflict with Fidel Castro over the running of the health sector, he was appointed to serve as the Politburo's delegate in the province of Matanzas. He remained in Matanzas until mid-1971; his administration of the province's economy and health sector was successful, particularly in terms of crop outputs, public transport and reduced infant mortality. Upon leaving Matanzas in 1971, he was appointed first secretary of the Cuban Communist Party in the province of Havana and was elected to the Politburo in December 1975.

Machado is a member of the National Assembly of People's Power, representing the municipality of Guantánamo. In 2006, he became responsible for overseeing Cuba's international education programs.

Machado has been described as "a hardline communist ideologue and old guard revolutionary."

On 10 January 2007, Machado represented Cuba at the inauguration of Nicaraguan President Daniel Ortega.

Machado was elected by the National Assembly of People's Power as First Vice-President of the Council of State on 24 February 2008, at the same time as Raúl Castro's election as President.

On 19 April 2021, Machado retired from the Politburo of the Communist Party of Cuba following the 8th Congress of the Communist Party of Cuba. The party's national newspaper Granma wrote on April 21, 2021 that Machado will accompany the new generation in transit to assume their responsibilities. The position of Second Secretary has been abolished.

Political offices
Preceded by Raúl Castro	First Vice President of Cuba; 2008–2013	Succeeded by Miguel Díaz-Canel
Party political offices
Preceded by Raúl Castro	Second Secretary of the Communist Party of Cuba; 2011–2021	Succeeded by position abolished
