= Politburo of the Communist Party of Cuba =

Organ of the Committee of the Communist Party of Cuba

The Politburo is the highest political organ of the Central Committee of the Communist Party of Cuba.

== History ==
The Politburo of the Central Committee was established on 3 October 1965 when the United Party of the Cuban Socialist Revolution was transformed into the present-day Communist Party of Cuba. It was established as the party's highest decision-making body between plenary sessions of the Central Committee, and its meetings were to be chaired by the First Secretary of the Central Committee. Of the eight members elected to the Provisional Politburo three concurrently served as members of the Provisional Secretariat.

Alternate membership in the Politburo was abolished at the 4th Party Congress, held on 10–14 October 1991, with the intention of streamlining the party's decision-making process.

=== Terms ===
Term	Members			Period		Duration
Term	Male	Female	Reelected	Start	End	Duration
Provisional	8	0	8	3 October 1965	17 December 1975	10 years, 75 days
1st	13	0	13	22 December 1975	17 December 1980	4 years, 361 days
2nd	26	1	15	20 December 1980	4 February 1986	5 years, 46 days
3rd	23	1	10	7 February 1986	10 October 1991	5 years, 245 days
4th	22	3	16	14 October 1991	8 October 1997	5 years, 359 days
5th	22	2	8	10 October 1997	16 April 2011	13 years, 188 days
6th	15	1	11	19 April 2011	16 April 2016	4 years, 363 days
7th	13	4	9	19 April 2016	16 April 2021	4 years, 362 days
8th	11	3	—	19 April 2021	Incumbent	5 years, 34 days

== See also ==
- Central Committee of the Communist Party of Cuba
- Secretariat of the Communist Party of Cuba
