= Sergio del Valle Jiménez =

Sergio del Valle Jiménez (15 April 1927—15 November 2007) was a high-ranking Cuban military and government official who served as army chief of staff during the 1962 Missile Crisis and headed various cabinet ministries during the 1960s, 1970s and 1980s.

== Biography ==
A physician by training, Sergio del Valle became a part of the movement against the government of Fulgencio Batista in the 1950s and, by 1957, was fighting in Fidel Castro's rebel army's second column under the leadership of Camilo Cienfuegos. After Castro took power, del Valle served in a number of top positions, most notably his key military post at the time of the Missile Crisis. In subsequent decades, he was Interior Minister (1968–79) and Public Health Minister (1979–86).

Sergio del Valle died in Havana at the age of 80.

== See also ==
- Ministry of the Interior of Cuba
