= Ulises Rosales del Toro =

Cuban politician

Minister of Agriculture
- In office 25 November 2008 – 13 June 2010

Personal details
- Born: March 8, 1942 (age 84)
- Party: Communist Party of Cuba
- Profession: Military

General Ulises Rosales del Toro (born March 8, 1942), is a Cuban politician and soldier. He is the former Cuban Minister of Agriculture (2008–2010).

== Early life ==
He serves in Cuba's Politburo of the Communist Party of Cuba, and previously served as chief of the general staff of the armed forces during the 1980s. He previously held the position of sugar minister. He has been Cuban Vice President since 19 February 2009.
