= José Ramón Balaguer =

Cuban politician (1932–2022)

Cuban ambassador to the Soviet Union
- In office February 1990 – 26 December 1991

Minister of Public Health
- In office 2004 – July 2010
- Preceded by: Damodar Peña Pentón
- Succeeded by: Roberto Morales Ojeda

Personal details
- Born: 6 June 1932 Guantánamo, Cuba
- Died: 15 July 2022 (aged 90) Segundo Frente, Cuba
- Party: Communist Party of Cuba

José Ramón Balaguer Cabrera (6 June 1932 – 15 July 2022) was a Cuban politician. He was the country's Minister of Health from 2004 to 2010. He previously served as the final Cuban ambassador to the Soviet Union.

== Early life ==
Balaguer was born in Guantánamo on 6 June 1932. He studied to be a physician. He joined the rebel army led by Fidel Castro that overthrew Fulgencio Batista in the Cuban Revolution, serving as a soldier–medic while the group was fighting in Sierra Maestra.

== Career ==
In the decade following the revolution, Balaguer served in various military positions, including substitute vice minister of the Armed Forces. He joined the Communist Party of Cuba upon its establishment in 1965. He subsequently became first secretary in Santiago de Cuba, acting in that capacity from 1976 to 1985.

Balaguer was appointed Cuban ambassador to the Soviet Union in February 1990. He became the last person to hold the position when the Soviet Union dissolved the following year. A hardline Castro loyalist, he replaced Carlos Aldana as head of the Departments of Ideology and International Relations in September 1992, after coming back to Cuba at the outset of the Special Period. During his tenure, Balaguer was sent by Raúl Castro – the defense minister at the time – to handle the economic crisis and mismanagement by local officials in Granma Province. He was succeeded as the party's chief of ideology by Esteban Lazo Hernández in June 2003.

Owing to his background in medicine, Balaguer was named Minister of Public Health in 2004. In that capacity, he was responsible for managing Fidel Castro's "pet health projects". He praised Sicko, the 2007 documentary by Michael Moore that unfavourably compared the American healthcare system to Cuba's, stating that it will "help the world see the deeply humane principles of Cuban society". He also refuted claims that the Cuban government teamed up with Moore to promote its healthcare system.

Balaguer was one of the six members of the Cuban government designated by Fidel Castro in his transfer of duties, which commenced in July 2006. He was also a member of the 5th Politburo of the Communist Party of Cuba. His statement and travel overseas the following month was regarded by observers as an indicator that Castro's health was stable, amidst conjectures at the time over whether he was still living. Under his leadership as health minister, dozens of patients at the Havana Psychiatric Hospital (Mazorra) died in 2010. Balaguer consequently approved the creation of a commission to look into the circumstances that led to the deaths. Although several doctors and officials connected with the hospital were imprisoned, Balaguer himself escaped public censure.

== Later life ==
After his term as health minister came to an end, Balaguer was elected to the party's Central Committee in April 2011, heading its Department of Foreign Relations. He also resigned his seat on the more influential politburo, ending his decades-long tenure on the body. He eventually retired from public life in 2019, citing ill health.

Balaguer died on 15 July 2022 at the age of 90. His cremated remains were first honoured at the veterans' pantheon in the Colon Cemetery, before being transported to the mausoleum of the combatants of the II Frank País Eastern Front in Santiago de Cuba, close to his place of birth.

Party political offices
Preceded by Carlos Aldana	Head of the Department of Ideology and Department of International Relations; 1992–2003	Succeeded by Esteban Lazo Hernández
Political offices
Preceded by	Minister of Public Health; 2004–2010	Succeeded by
