= José Ramón Fernández =

Cuban politician (1923–2019)

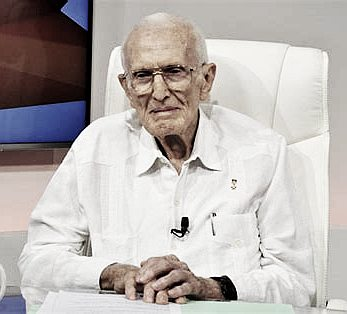
- Fernández in 2018
- Born: November 4, 1923; Santiago de Cuba
- Died: January 6, 2019 (aged 95); Havana
- Occupations: Politician, revolutionary

José Ramón Fernández Álvarez (November 4, 1923 – January 6, 2019) was a Cuban Communist leader who was a vice-president of the Council of Ministers.

== Pre-Revolution life ==
Fernández Alvarez was born in Santiago de Cuba, where he studied his first and second education. In 1947 he graduated from the Cadet School of Cuba and also from the Artillery School as well as from other courses of the General Staff in Cuba and at Fort Sill in the USA.

From March 10, 1952, he took part in different conspiracy activities and movements against Fulgencio Batista's tyranny with different military and political groups, until 1956 when he was caught when the conspiracy movement called "Los puros" was discovered. He was judged and sentenced to prison at Presidio Modelo on the Isla de Pinos (Isle of Pines) until the Castro brothers' victory over Batista on January 1, 1959.

== Cuban Revolution and beyond ==
From 1959, as a member of the Revolutionary Armed Forces, Fernández took part in various mobilizations, both productive as well as for the defense of the country. He also carried out other tasks of the Cuban Revolution both in Cuba and abroad.

At the time of the Bay of Pigs Invasion on 17 April 1961, he was director of militia training and based at Managua near Havana. He was sometimes referred to as 'El Gallego' like his colleague Manuel Piñeiro. Before dawn that day, Fidel Castro ordered him to command the many battalions of militia and regular army troops engaged in fighting the invading forces of Brigade 2506. Late on 19 April 1961, he was among Cuban government forces who finally broke through to Playa Giron and forced the surrender and dispersal of invading troops.

He was promoted to the rank of Capitan in 1959, to Commandant in 1961 and to Brigade General of the reserve in 1966. He graduated from the Higher War School in 1964. From 1959 on he was in charge of different responsibilities and positions, among which there were; Director of the Cadet School of the Rebel Army; Chief of the Direction of Combat Preparation of the General Staff of FAR (initials for Revolutionary Armed Forces in Spanish) until 1968; Deputy Minister of FAR until 1970; First Deputy Minister of Education until 1972; Minister of Education from 1972 until 1990 and vice-president of the Council of Ministers from 1978 to March 2012.

== Political life ==
He represented the Cuban government at the investiture of presidents in several Latin American countries and at other governmental events. He was a member of the executive committee of the Pan American Sports Organization.

Fernández Álvarez took part in the seven Congresses of the Cuban Communist Party and beginning in 1975 was a member of the Central Committee.

At the third congress of the Cuban Communist Party, he was elected as a Substitute Member of the Political Bureau. Fernandez was a deputy to the National Assembly from 1976 until his death and a Member of the Council of State from 1981 until 1993.

== Other organizational roles ==
Fernández chaired the Organizing Committee of the XIV Central American and Caribbean Games, held in Havana in 1982, and the Organizing Committee of the XI Pan American Games in Havana in 1991. He was also the chairman of the Organizing Committee of the VI Athletics World Cup that took place in Havana in 1992. From 1997 until 2018 he was the President of the Cuban Olympic Committee.

He was the chairman of the Organizing Committee of the Scientific–Academic Conference "Giron, 40 years later", which took place in March 2001 and of the International Conference "The Missile Crisis, a political vision 40 years later" in October 2002. Fernandez was Emeritus Professor of the Pedagogical Higher Institute "Enrique José Varona".

== Personal life ==
Fernández married Asela de los Santos, a fellow revolutionary leader. She was a cofounder and the secretary general of the Federation of Cuban Women (FMC) and served as Deputy Minister, then First Minister of Education in the government of the Communist Party of Cuba.

== Acknowledgements ==
In recognition of his work he was awarded several medals, among them the title of Hero of the Republic of Cuba.

== See also ==
- Cuban Revolution
- Cuban Missile Crisis
