= Sixto Batista Santana =

Cuban military officer and politician

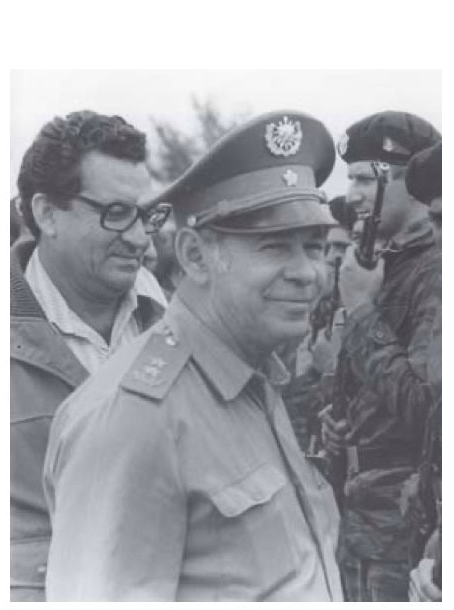
Sixto Batista

Sixto Batista Santana (28 March 1932 – 29 June 2014) was a Cuban military officer and politician.

During his early youth, Santana joined Cuba's largest rebel army, and met Fidel Castro during the Cuban Revolution. As he became older, Castro rewarded Santana with several promotions, including to Chief of the Political Staff. Santana had an involvement in Castro's defense policies.

In 1965, Santana joined the Communist Party of Cuba, and was automatically put on the main committee due to his affiliation and commitment towards Castro. Santana joined the Cuban Council as well, and received numerous awards for his work.
