= History of Cuba (1959–present) =

Republic of Cuba República de Cuba
- 1959–present
- Flag Coat of arms of Cuba
- Motto: Patria y Libertad (Fatherland and Liberty)
- Anthem: La Bayamesa "The Bayamo Song"
- Status: Member of the Comecon (1972–1991)
- Capital and largest city: Havana
- Official languages: Spanish
- Demonym: Cuban
- Government: Unitary semi-presidential republic (January–July 1959) Unitary revolutionary republic (1959–1961) Unitary communist state (1961–present)
- First Secretary of the Communist Party
  - 1965–2011: Fidel Castro
  - 2011–2021: Raúl Castro
  - 2021–present: Miguel Díaz-Canel
- President & President of the Council of State
  - 1959 (first): Manuel Urrutia Lleó
  - 2019–present: Miguel Díaz-Canel
- Prime Minister & President of the Council of Ministers
  - 1959 (first): José M. Cardona
  - 2019–present: Manuel Marrero Cruz
- Legislature: National Assembly of People's Power
- History
  - Triumph of the Revolution: 1 January 1959
  - Socialist state declared: 16 April 1961
  - Bay of Pigs Invasion: 17–20 April 1961
  - Cuban Missile Crisis: 16–28 October 1962
  - Communist Party of Cuba created: 3 October 1965
  - Revolutionary Offensive: 1968–1970
  - Padilla affair: 1971
  - Mariel boatlift: April 15 – October 31, 1980
  - Special Period: 1991–2000
  - 2026 Cuban crisis: January 3, 2026 – present

Area
  - Total: 110,860 km^{2} (42,800 sq mi)
  - Water (%): 0.94

Population
  - 2024 estimate: ▼9,748,007 (95th)
  - 2022 census: ▼11,089,511
  - Density: 89.8/km^{2} (232.6/sq mi) (125th)
- Currency: Peso (CUP)
- Time zone: UTC−5 (CST)
  - Summer (DST): UTC−4 (CDT)
- Calling code: +53
Preceded by
1959: First Republic

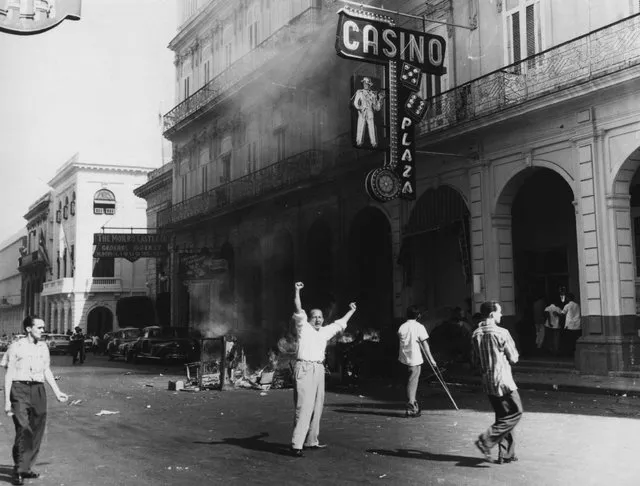
Rioters burn card tables and roulette wheels at Plaza Hotel Casino (January 1, 1959)

The modern history of Cuba began in 1959, after the Cuban Revolution led by Fidel Castro ousted a US-backed dictator Fulgencio Batista, following a guerrilla war that lasted about two years and culminated in a battle of Santa Clara. The initial period saw a climate of euphoria after the toppling of the regime.

While in power, Castro began to implement agrarian reforms, including expropriation of the foreign (mostly American) property, including the United Fruit Company, which caused conflict with the United States which in response imposed an embargo on Cuba.

Over time, Castro began to engage in contacts with Cuban communist groups, backed by his brother Raúl and Che Guevara, and Cuba's international relations became closer to the Soviet Union. While initially claiming the revolution being "humanist", Castro announced that the movement was socialist in nature in April 1961. In the same moment, the US-sponsored Bay of Pigs Invasion began and failed to topple Fidel's government. In December of the same year, Castro declared himself a Marxist–Leninist for the rest of his life.

The consolidation of the revolution culminated in the missile crisis in October 1962 which was widely considered the closest the Cold War came to escalating into full-scale nuclear war. In its result, Cuba stayed a Soviet-backed communist state with centrally planned economy.

Abroad, communist Cuba supported anti-imperialist revolutionary groups, backing the establishment of Marxist governments in Chile, Nicaragua, and Grenada, as well as sending troops to aid allies in the Yom Kippur, Ogaden, and Angolan Civil wars. These actions, coupled with Castro's leadership of the Non-Aligned Movement from 1979 to 1983 and Cuban medical internationalism, increased Cuba's profile on the world stage.

Following the dissolution of the Soviet Union in 1991, Cuba entered into a severe economic crisis known as the "Special Period" from 1991 to 2000, during which rare anti-government protests known as Maleconazo erupted in August 1994. The crisis ended after the election of pro-Cuban President Hugo Chávez in Venezuela in 1999, and the Vladimir Putin's rise to power in Russia in 2000.

In the early 2000s, Fidel Castro's health began to detoriate and he was replaced by his brother Raúl as the leader of the country. Raúl's rule was characterized by a pragmatic economic reform, rise of tourism in Cuba and diplomatic rapprochement, including a brief improvement of relations with the United States that culminated with US President Barack Obama's visit to Havana in 2016. The relations with the United States declined again when Donald Trump became President, and led to the 2026 Cuban crisis.

== Early years (1959–1968) ==
=== 1959 ===
==== Fall of the Batista regime ====
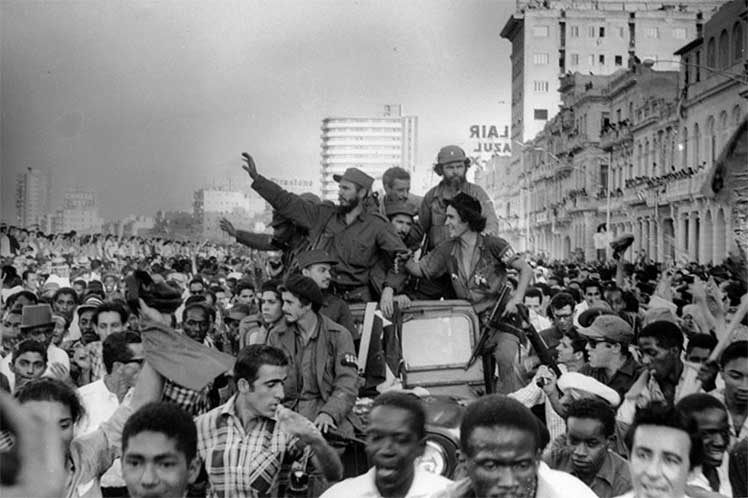
Entrance of Fidel Castro and Huber Matos into Havana. (January 8, 1959)

Immediately after the overthrow of the Batista's regime, the unprecedented and unexpected joy broke out. Members of the Revolutionary Directorate of 13 March Movement occupied the University of Havana, and the Presidential Palace. The action was done under the pretext of anxiety. When Fidel Castro announced his victory, and the establishment of a provisional government, no mention was made of the involvement of other rebel groups in such a government. Besides the rebel occupation, Cuban citizens began to loot and vandalize Havana. Angry mobs attacked several casinos, and destroyed slot machines. Sporadic gun fights killed thirteen people. The casino at Sans Souci was set ablaze by arsonists. Alongside the chaos, many citizens filled the streets in celebration of the flight of Batista, often shouting the slogan "Abajo Batista, Viva Fidel" ("Down with Batista, Long live Fidel"). On January 2, Castro called for a general strike, and began his trek to Havana in his self-stylized "Freedom Caravan". The rebel army columns led by Che Guevara, and Camilo Cienfuegos reached Havana by January 2. The next day, Guevara secured La Cabaña fortress in Havana. The arrival of the 26th of July Movement restored order in Havana, ending the rioting. On January 8, Castro entered Havana in a triumphal way.

A provisional government led by the liberal President Manuel Urrutia Lleó was established, together with Prime Minister José Miró Cardona who was quickly replaced by Castro himself in February 1959. Once in power, Urrutia swiftly began a program of closing all brothels, gambling outlets and the national lottery, arguing that these had long been a corrupting influence on the state. The measures drew immediate resistance from the large associated workforce. The disapproving Castro, then commander of Cuba's new armed forces, intervened to request a stay of execution until alternative employment could be found. Disagreements also arose in the new government concerning pay cuts, which were imposed on all public officials on Castro's demand. The disputed cuts included a reduction of the $100,000 a year presidential salary Urrutia had inherited from Batista.

==== Fidel Castro's rise and consolidation of power ====
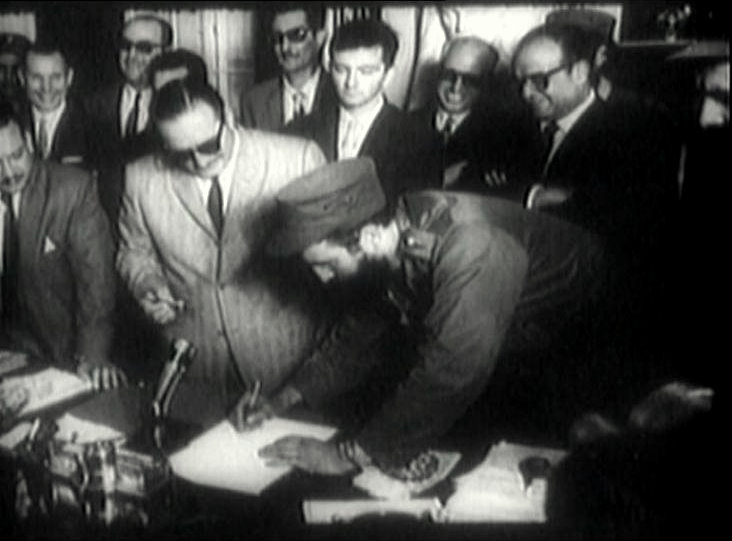
Fidel Castro becoming a Prime Minister of Cuba (February 16, 1959).

By February, following the surprise resignation of Miró, Castro had assumed the role of prime minister; this strengthened his power and rendered Urrutia increasingly a figurehead president. As Urrutia's participation in the legislative process declined, other unresolved disputes between the two leaders continued to fester. His belief in the restoration of elections was rejected by Castro, who felt that they would usher in a return to the old discredited system of corrupt parties and fraudulent balloting that had marked the Batista era.

Urrutia was then accused by the Avance newspaper of buying a luxury villa, which was portrayed as a frivolous betrayal of the revolution and led to an outcry from the general public. He denied the allegation issuing a writ against the newspaper in response. The story further increased tensions between the various factions in the government, though Urrutia asserted publicly that he had "absolutely no disagreements" with Fidel Castro. Urrutia attempted to distance the Cuban government (including Castro) from the growing influence of the Communists within the administration, making a series of critical public comments against the latter group. Whilst Castro had not openly declared any affiliation with the Cuban communists, Urrutia had been a declared anti-Communist since they had refused to support the insurrection against Batista, stating in an interview, "If the Cuban people had heeded those words, we would still have Batista with us ... and all those other war criminals who are now running away".

On July 17, 1959, Conrado Bécquer, the sugar workers' leader, demanded Urrutia's resignation. Castro himself resigned as Prime Minister of Cuba in protest, but later that day appeared on television to deliver a lengthy denouncement of Urrutia, claiming that Urrutia "complicated" government, and that his "fevered anti-Communism" was having a detrimental effect. Castro's sentiments received widespread support as organized crowds surrounded the presidential palace demanding Urrutia's resignation, which was duly received. On July 23, Castro resumed his position as the Prime Minister and appointed a more loyal Osvaldo Dorticós as the new president, thus ending a dual power with a liberal President and strengthening his absolute control.

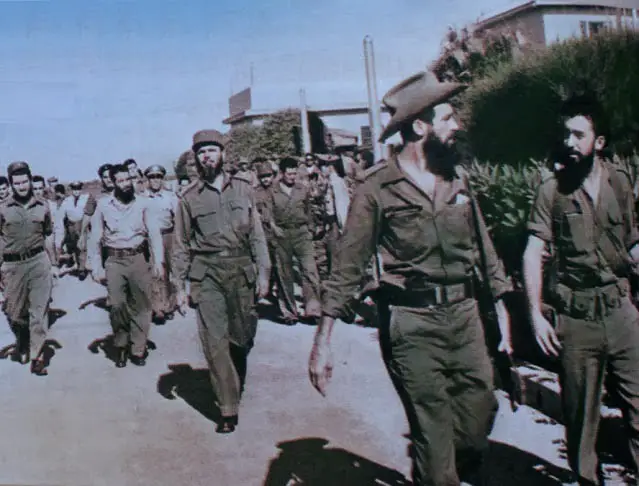
Arrest of Huber Matos (back), with Camilo Cienfuegos (in front) leading (October 21, 1959).

In October 1959, a so-called Matos affair happened. Huber Matos, a former Castro ally and a Commander of the Army in the province of Camagüey, opposed to growing influence of the communists. Fidel responded with his arrested a sentence of 20 years in prison, suppressing internal revolutionary dissent and cementing Castro's autocracy. Camilo Cienfuegos, the Commander-in-chief of the Revolutionary Armed Forces, disappeared a weak later near the Straits of Florida, which caused conspiracy theory of Fidel or Raúl Castro planning to eliminate him from a power struggle. By the end of 1959, Fidel Castro's power became unchecked and unquestioned.

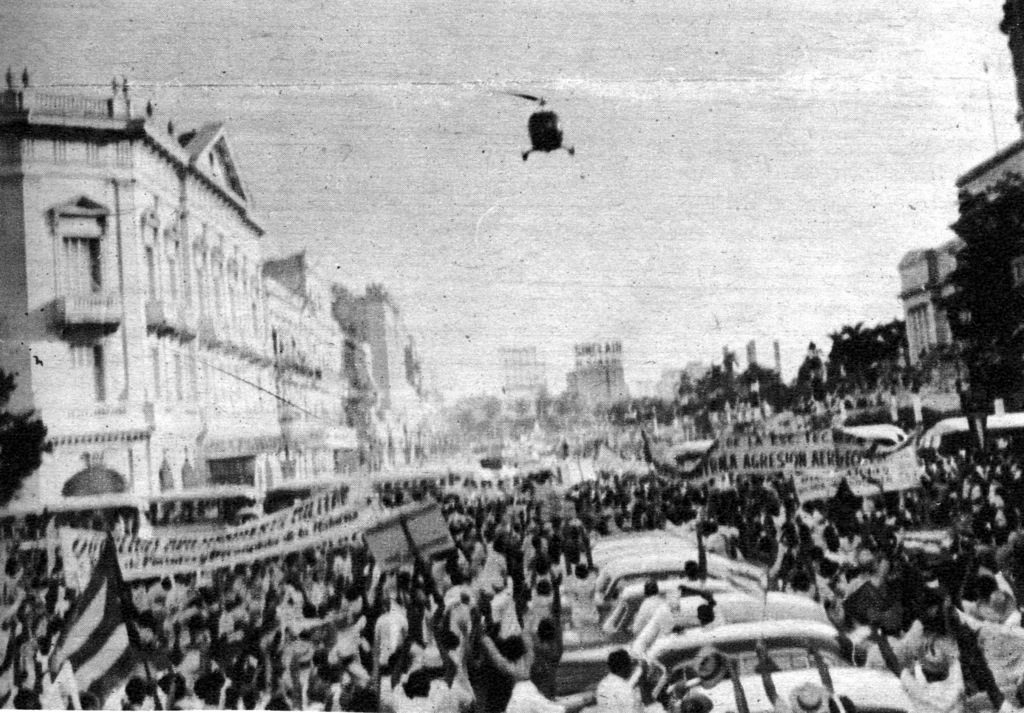
Diario de La Marina, the most popular newspaper in Cuba, became the target of the pro-Castro unrest in 1959 after it had published articles against Fidel Castro. In May 1960, a mob attacked the newspaper, which led to its closure.

In 1959, coletilla was implemented, which was considered a press censorship. Soon after the Cuban Revolution in 1959, Fidel Castro announced in a speech given on April 9, 1959, that the elections which were promised to occur after the revolution were to be delayed. On May Day, 1960, Fidel Castro would outright condemn elections as corrupt, and cancel all future elections.

In the beginning of 1959, Cuban printers unions began demanding that newspapers which were critical of the government add a "coletilla" ("clarification") next to articles that rebuked critical comments in the articles. By the end of 1960, according to political scientist Paul H. Lewis, all opposition newspapers had been closed down and all radio and television stations were under state control. In nearly all areas of government, loyalty to the regime became the primary criterion for all appointments.

==== Repression against Batista loyalists ====
To implement a portion of the plan of revenge, Castro named Guevara commander of the La Cabaña prison, for a five-month tenure (2 January through 12 June 1959). Guevara was charged by the new government with purging the Batista army and consolidating victory by exacting "revolutionary justice" against those regarded as traitors, chivatos (informants), or war criminals. As commander of La Cabaña, Guevara reviewed the appeals of those convicted during the revolutionary tribunal process.

==== First agrarian reform ====
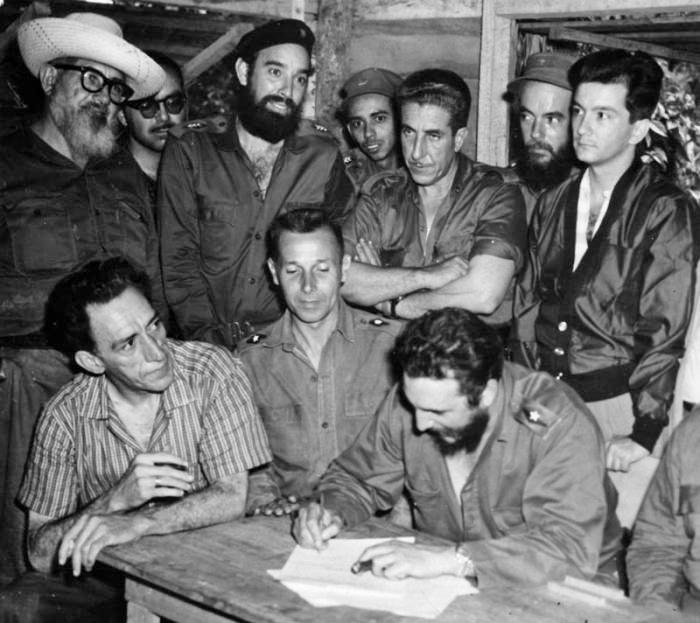
Fidel Castro signs first agrarian law in 1959.

The first reform law was implemented on May 17, 1959, which eliminated latifundios—large scale private ownerships, and granted ownership and titles to workers who previously worked on those lands, and paying rent for land was abolished. The law the regulated the size of farms to 3,333 acres (13 km^{2}) and real estate to 1,000 acres (4 km^{2}). Any holdings over these limits were expropriated by the government and either redistributed to peasants in 67 acres (271,139 m^{2}) parcels or held as state-run communes.

Four days after the announcement of the law, the owners of the 34 major American sugar mills went to the U.S. embassy to voice their frustrations. On June 3, 1959, the law went into effect. On June 11, the U.S. government issues an official statement of protest, claiming that compensation is too low. Compensation was based on tax estimates from 30 to 40 years ago, thus making estimated values below contemporary values.

On the anniversary of the 26th of July, the Cuban government invited peasants who had received new land titles to visit Havana. Half a million visiting peasants were housed in either private homes or in the gala hall of the Presidential Palace.

Agrarian reform caused almost 40% of arable land to be removed from foreign owners and corporations to the state, which then distributed these lands primarily to farmers and agricultural workers. This arrangement gave small peasant farmers limited autonomy, but it all changed in August 1962 when Castro announced that the small cooperatives would be converted to state farmers. Moreover, in instances where government seizes land from small peasants for public use, the small peasants are entitled to compensations. In the case for Cuba, compensations, though wrote into the reforms, were not guaranteed when land titles were liquidised under the state. The law also stipulated that sugar plantations could not be owned by foreigners. For lands taken over compensation was offered in the form of Cuban currency bonds to mature in 20 years at 4.5% interest. Bonds were based on land values as assessed for tax purposes. Lastly, two years into the implementation of the first agrarian land reforms, approximately 58.4 per cent of arable land was privately owned, while 41.6 per cent was under government control, which required a second wave of reforms. Both of these reforms were carried out for the purpose of increasing production, diversifying crop production, and eliminating rural poverty.

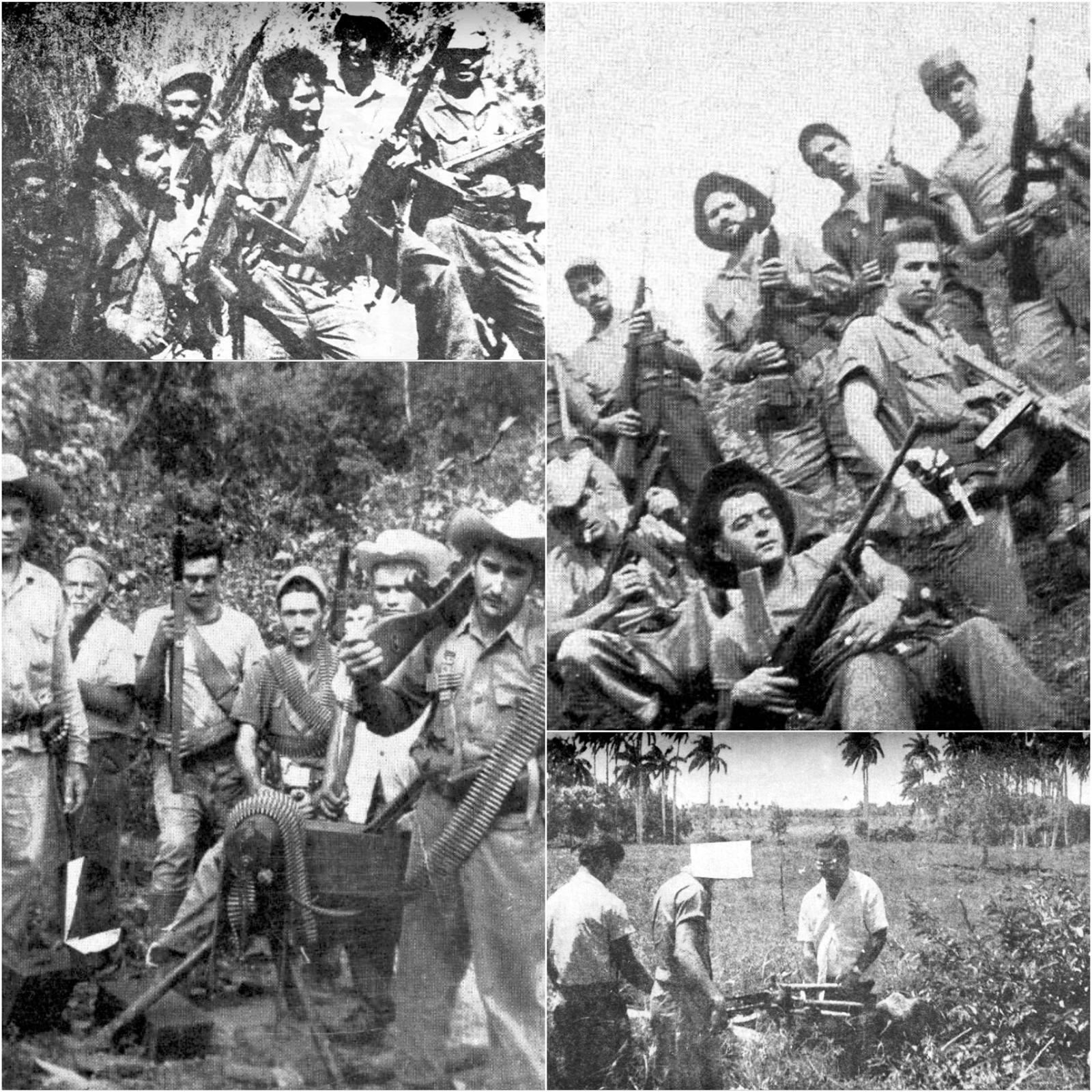
Anti-communist insurgents in Cuba, between 1959 and 1964.

==== Rebellion against Castro ====
Immediately after the success of the revolution, the rebellion in Escambray Mountains began.

It was led by an ex-guerrilla that had fought against Batista before, but rejected the socialist turn the Cuban Revolution had taken and the ensuing close ties with the Soviet Union. Small landowning farmers, who disagreed with the socialist government's collectivization of Cuban farmlands also played a central role in the failed rebellion. The uprising was also secretly backed by the CIA and the Eisenhower administration because of Castro's ties with the Soviet Union.

The insurgent guajiro rural farmers were aided by some former Batista forces but were led mostly by former DR rebels (13 March Movement), such as the anti-communists Osvaldo Ramirez and Comandante William Alexander Morgan, both of whom had fought Batista's casquitos in the same area only a few years before (Morgan himself was executed in 1961, long before the resistance ended). Ramirez and Morgan were viewed by the United States as potential pro-democracy options for Cuba and sent CIA-trained Cuban exiles to promote and spread word of them being an alternative to Castro.

The rebels were a mix of former soldiers of the Batista regime, local farmers, and turncoat ex-guerrillas who had fought alongside Castro against Batista during the Cuban Revolution. The result was the elimination of all insurgents by Cuban government forces in 1965.

=== 1960 ===
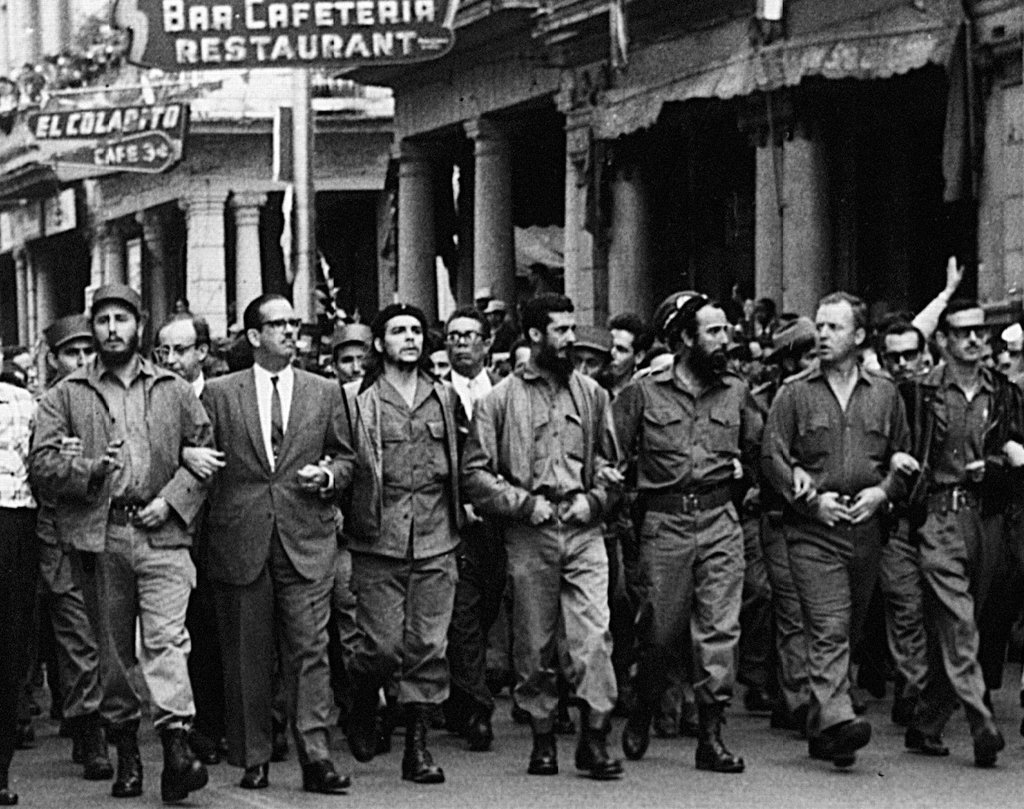
Che Guevara (third from left) and Fidel Castro (far left) marching to Colón Cemetery (March 4, 1960).

On 4 March 1960, the French freighter La Coubre exploded in Havana Harbor, killing up to 100 people and injuring several hundred more. Upon hearing the blast, Guevara rushed to the harbor to board the burning ship, angrily forcing his way past those concerned for his safety following a secondary explosion.

The following day on 5 March, Prime Minister Fidel Castro blamed the U.S. CIA and called for a memorial service and mass demonstration at Havana's Colón Cemetery, to honor the victims. At the time, Guevara was Minister of Industry in the new government, and Korda was Castro's official photographer. After a funeral march along the seafront boulevard known as Malecón, Fidel Castro gave a eulogy for the fallen at a stage on the corner of 23rd and 12th streets. Castro gave a fiery speech, using the words "Patria o Muerte" ("Homeland or Death") for the first time.

Fidel Castro giving a speech of First Declaration of Havana (September 2, 1960)

On 2 September, Fidel spoken of the Plaza Cívica the First Declaration of Havana, which condemned American imperialism, OAS's Declaration of San José, interventionism, right-wing dictatorships in Latin America and oligarchies exploiting workers and peasants.

=== 1961 ===
==== Bay of Pigs Invasion ====
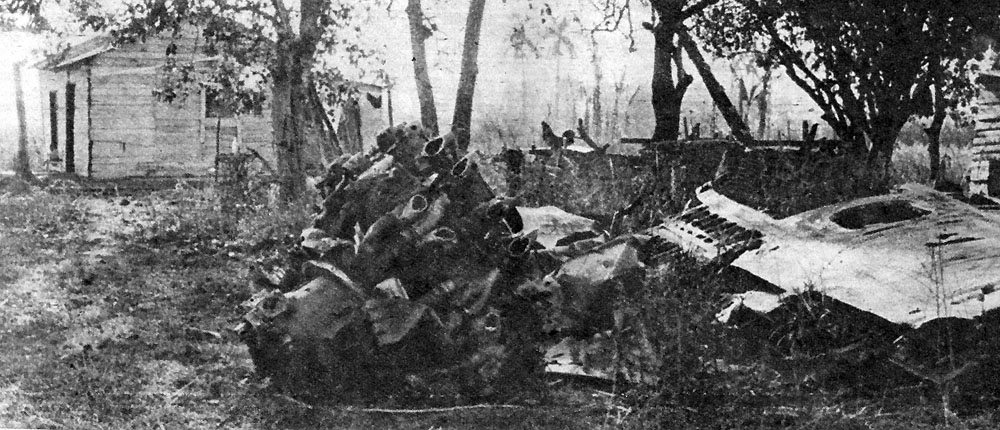
Brigade 2506 (Cuban opposition armed group) plane shot down over Australia village

On 16 April 1961, Castro declared that the revolution had a socialist character. In the meantime, the United States had begun contemplating ways to remove Castro. This led to the Bay of Pigs Invasion on 17-20 April, when the US-backed Cuban anti-Castro rebels landed on the shore of Playa Girón, in a failed attempt to overthrow his government.

=== 1962 ===
==== Cuban Missile Crisis ====
On 26 March 1962, Fidel Castro merged the 26th of July Movement, the Popular Socialist Party, and the Revolutionary Directorate of 13 March Movement, into a sole legal party named the United Party of the Socialist Revolution of Cuba (PURSC).

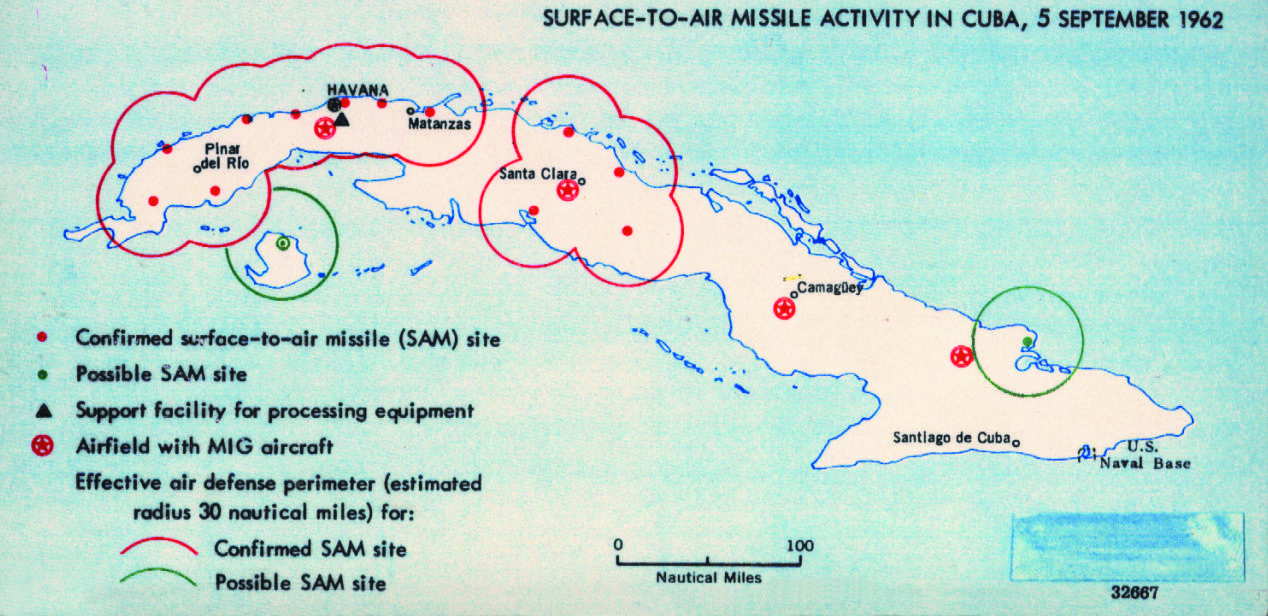
Map created by American intelligence showing all known Surface-to-Air Missile activity in Cuba (September 5, 1962)

The Cuban communist regime ultimately prevailed following a Missile Crisis in October 1962, an event considered close to World War III.

Soviet and Cuban governments agreed, at a meeting between leaders Nikita Khrushchev and Fidel Castro in July 1962, to place nuclear missiles on Cuba to deter a future US invasion. Construction of launch facilities started shortly thereafter.

A U-2 spy plane captured photographic evidence of medium- and long-range launch facilities in October. US president John F. Kennedy convened a meeting of the National Security Council and other key advisers, forming the Executive Committee of the National Security Council (EXCOMM). Kennedy was advised to carry out an air strike on Cuban soil in order to compromise Soviet missile supplies, followed by an invasion of the Cuban mainland. He chose a less aggressive course in order to avoid a declaration of war. On 22 October, Kennedy ordered a naval blockade to prevent further missiles from reaching Cuba. He referred to the blockade as a "quarantine", not as a blockade, so the US could avoid the formal implications of a state of war.

An agreement was eventually reached between Kennedy and Khrushchev. The Soviets would dismantle their offensive weapons in Cuba, subject to United Nations verification, in exchange for a US public declaration and agreement not to invade Cuba again.

=== 1962–1965 ===
==== Great Debate ====
The Great Debate was an era in Cuban history retroactively named by historians, that was defined by public debate about the future of Cuban economic policy that took place from 1962 to 1965. The debate began after Cuba fell into an economic crisis in 1962 after years of internal economic complications, United States sanctions, and the flight of professionals from Cuba. In 1962 Fidel Castro invited Marxist economists around the world to debate two main propositions. One proposition proposed by Che Guevara was that Cuba could bypass any capitalist then "socialist" transition period and immediately become an industrialized "communist" society if "subjective conditions" like public consciousness and vanguard action are perfected. The other proposition held by the Popular Socialist Party was that Cuba required a transitionary period as a mixed economy in which Cuba's sugar economy was maximized for profit before a "communist" society could be established.

The Great Debate would result in somewhat of a compromise in which Fidel Castro used moral incentives rather than material incentives to motivate workers, and industrialization would be ignored in favor of a focus on the sugar economy. These policies would eventually culminate in the Revolutionary Offensive where the economy would be oriented in producing 10 million tons of sugar by 1970. The campaign failed and led to a reorientation of domestic Cuban politics.

=== 1965 ===
On 3 October 1965, the United Party of the Socialist Revolution of Cuba was officially renamed to Communist Party of Cuba (PCC).

=== 1968 ===
==== Revolutionary Offensive ====
By 1965, Cuba was officially a one-party state after a long period of political solidification by Fidel Castro after the Cuban Revolution. In September 1966, Fidel Castro gave a speech to representatives of the Committees for the Defense of the Revolution. In the speech, he gave his ruling that workers would no longer receive material bonuses for extra labor and instead be encouraged by "moral enthusiasm" alone, which distanced Cuba from the Soviet model of using material incentives. This independent approach to economic policy fell into a global trend during the Cold War in which Third World countries adopted independent economic strategies in relation to the industrialized dominant power blocs.

Cuba had begun what was referred to as the "radical experiment", where the country was to be reorganized to promote revolutionary consciousness and an independent economy. Rural to urban migration was regulated, excess urban workers were sent to the countryside, and agricultural labor became common for students, soldiers, and convicts. The Military Units to Aid Production (UMAPs) were established and used "anti-social" prisoners as penal laborers in agriculture.

In February 1968, a group in the Communist Party of Cuba and other official organizations known as the "microfaction" was completely purged from the government. The group numbered almost forty officials who endorsed Soviet-style material incentives over moral enthusiasm to encourage workers. They were accused of conspiring against the state, and made to serve prison sentences.

The Revolutionary Offensive drew on ideas articulated by Che Guevara during the Great Debate, a period of well-publicized economic debates in Cuba.

== Padilla affair, the grey years and the institutionalization and rectification processes (1971–1992) ==
=== Padilla affair ===
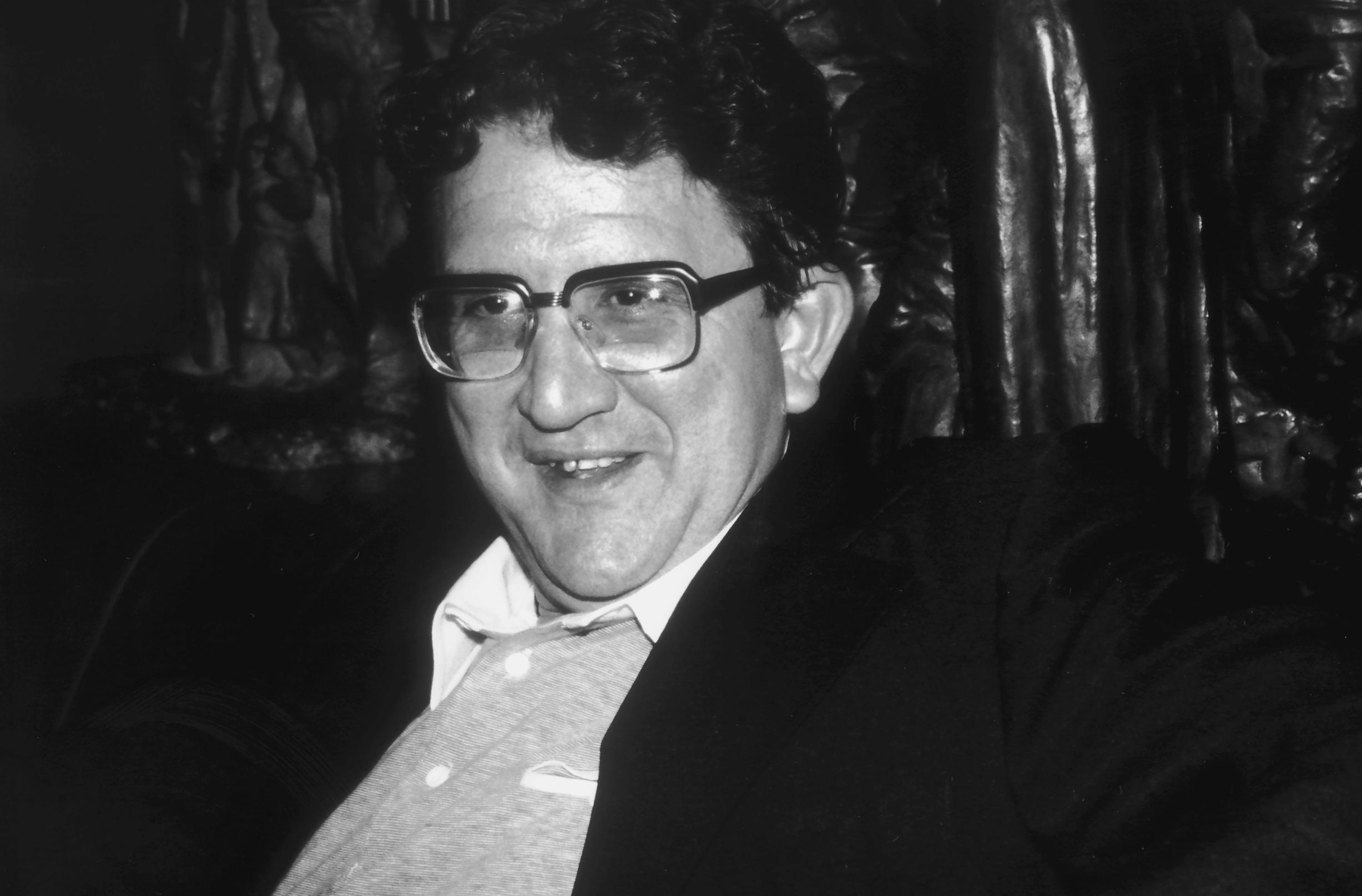
Herberto Padilla, a Cuban dissident poet repressed by the Castro regime

By the late 1960s, criticism of the post-revolutionary government became visible among intellectuals, such as Herberto Padilla. The communist regime responded with repression, including imprisonment of Padilla in 1971. The early 1970s era became known as quinquenio gris ("five grey years"). This period was characterized by cultural censorship, harassment of intellectuals and artists, and the ostracization of members of the LGBT+ community. Greater monetary influence from the Soviet Union during this time period pressured Cuba into adopting a model of cultural repression that was reflected in Cuba's domestic policy throughout the 1970s.

After being confronted with the United States embargo and blockade that essentially cut the island nation off from the capitalist world, Cuba became heavily reliant on the Soviet Union for goods. By 1968, Cuba was well on its way to becoming completely dependent on the USSR. The year was marked by Fidel Castro's support juxtaposed with Western criticism of the Warsaw Pact invasion of Czechoslovakia, the total nationalization of all property and censorship of cultural actors in the "Revolutionary Offensive", and the 1968 Cultural Congress in Havana which held debates on whether or not Cuban culture should be independent from political ideologies.

In 1970, Cuba set an ambitious goal for sugar production in an attempt to alleviate their economic struggles. Castro aimed for the manufacturing of ten million tons of raw sugar, more than twice the average harvest during that time. Ultimately, the harvest failed to reach its goal. With worldwide contempt growing against Cuba, the nation decided to join COMECON (the Soviet "common market") as a full member and sign a new sugarcane contract with the Soviet Union. This did allow sugar production to steadily increase in Cuba, but also led to a greater reliance on the USSR and paved the way for the mimicry of their censorship policies throughout the decade.

By the 1980s, the negative consequences of Cuba's "Sovietized" domestic policy became evident: economic failure, high levels of corruption, excessive bureaucratization, and the growing demoralization of the Cuban people. The resulting movement of the Cuban government away from this approach, along with Hart's position as Minister of Culture, sparked a "rectification" process of correcting previous mistakes. These amends included tempering off the repressive policies of the grey years and allowed for a cultural revival during this time.

=== El Diálogo ===
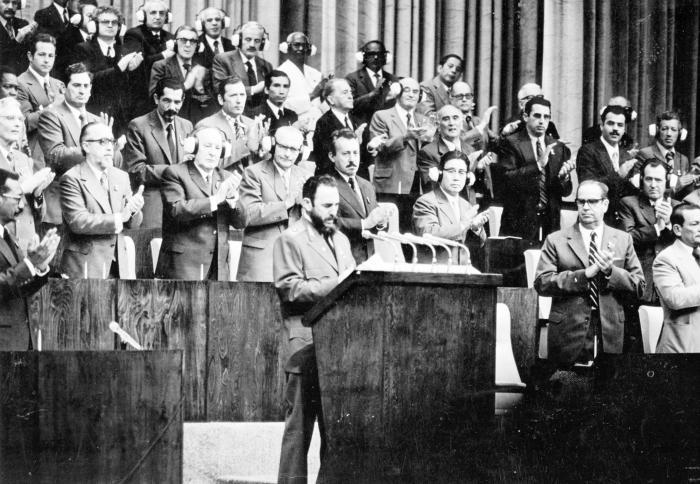
Fidel Castro on a first congress of the Communist Party of Cuba (December 1975)

In 1978, negotiations occurred between Cuban exile groups and the Cuban government that resulted in the release of political prisoners. The dialogue came after increasing calls for better diplomatic relations to Cuba from young Cuban American groups, and US President Jimmy Carter's new human rights oriented foreign policy. The negotiations originated with Jimmy Carter meeting in secret with Cuban officials in New York and Havana. After the talks resulted in prisoner release, Carter refused to publicly acknowledge his involvement, and the Cuban government decided to publicly invite Cuban exiles to negotiate with them for a prisoner release. The Comite de los 75 (Committee of 75) formed as the 75 Cuban exiles who would be allowed to negotiate with Cuba. The dialogue and eventual prisoner release came with a new friendlier attitude from Fidel Castro in addressing Cuban exiles. While previously he referred to them with the epithet "gusano", he now referred to them as the "Cuban community abroad". The dialogue also spurred intense internal debate among Cuban exiles about the ethics and usefulness of the dialogue, and it resulted in violent attacks against dialogueros.

=== Institutionalization process ===
The institutionalization process of the Cuban revolution was a series of political reforms, typically identified by historians as to have taken place between 1976 and 1986, although sometimes identified as having begun in 1970. This process was proceeded by a period of government that was directly managed by Fidel Castro without much input from other officials, which had been status-quo since the conclusion of the Cuban Revolution. The institutionalization process was also proceeded by a deepening of Cuba-Soviet relations in the early 1970s, which had soured before in the 1960s. The communist government established a unicameral legislature called the National Assembly of People's Power. The new constitution was approved by the first congress of the Communist Party of Cuba which met in December 1975, and was ratified on February 24, 1976. According to scholar Carmelo Mesa-Lago, the constitution was 32% based on the Soviet constitution of 1936, and 36% was based on the Cuban constitution of 1940. In 1976, competitive municipal elections appeared, and the National Assembly for People's Power was then elected indirectly by Municipal Assemblies, which gave Cubans a genuine, albeit limited, choice.

=== Rectification process ===
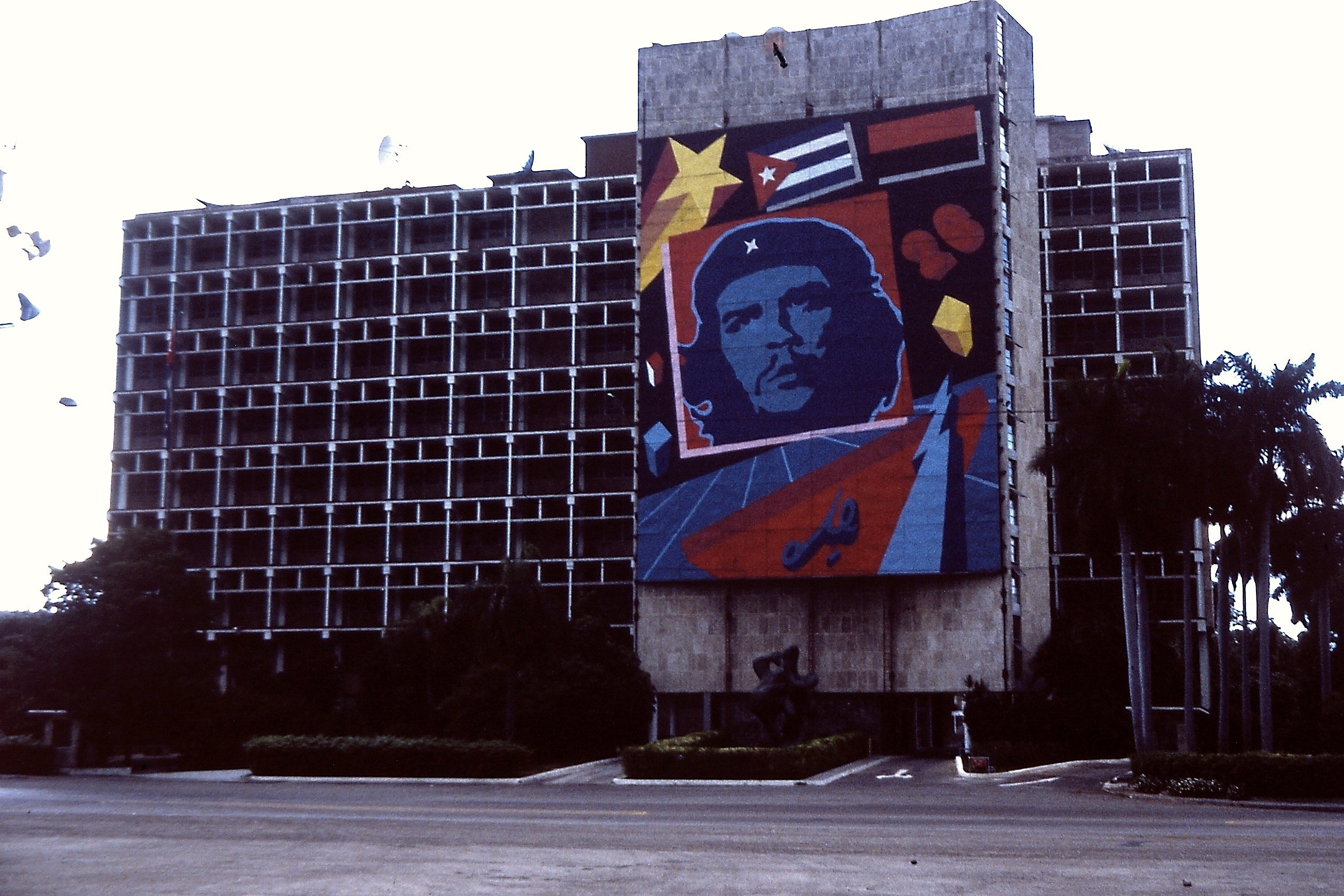
Mural of Che Guevara in Havana (1990)

The rectification process was a series of economic reform in Cuba that lasted from 1986 to 1992. The reforms were aimed at eliminating private businesses, trade markets, that had been introduced into the Cuban law and Cuban culture, during the 1970s. The new reforms aimed to nationalize more of the economy and eliminate material incentives for extra labor, instead relying on moral enthusiasm alone. Castro often justified this return to moral incentives by mentioning the moral incentives championed by Che Guevara, and often alluded to Guevarism when promoting reforms.

After the advent of Perestroika and Glasnost in the Soviet Union, certain sectors of the Communist Party of Cuba began contemplating similar reforms in Cuba. The rectification process was enacted by Castro in defiance of these reformist tendencies in the party, that admired reformism in the Soviet Union. In 1992, the National Assembly of People's Power became directly elected, albeit also stripped of the post-1976 indirect grassroots influence.

== Special period (1991–2000) ==
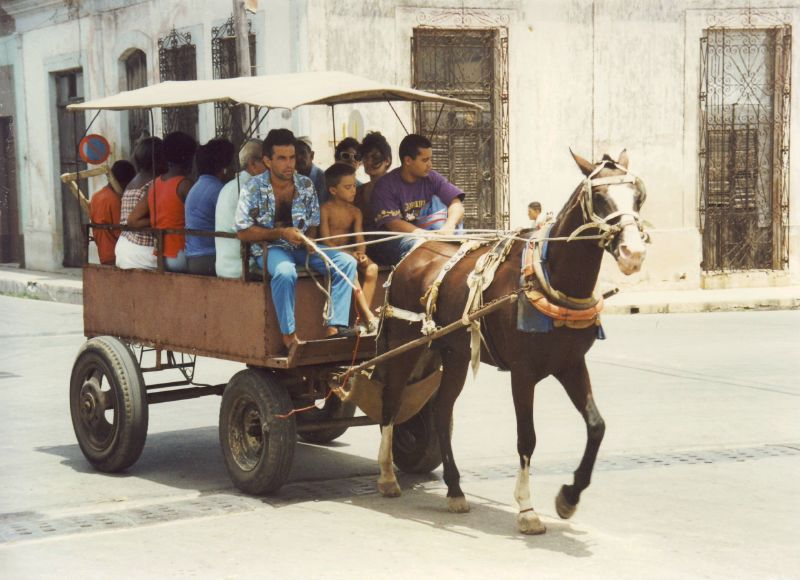
Horse transport near Varadero (1994)

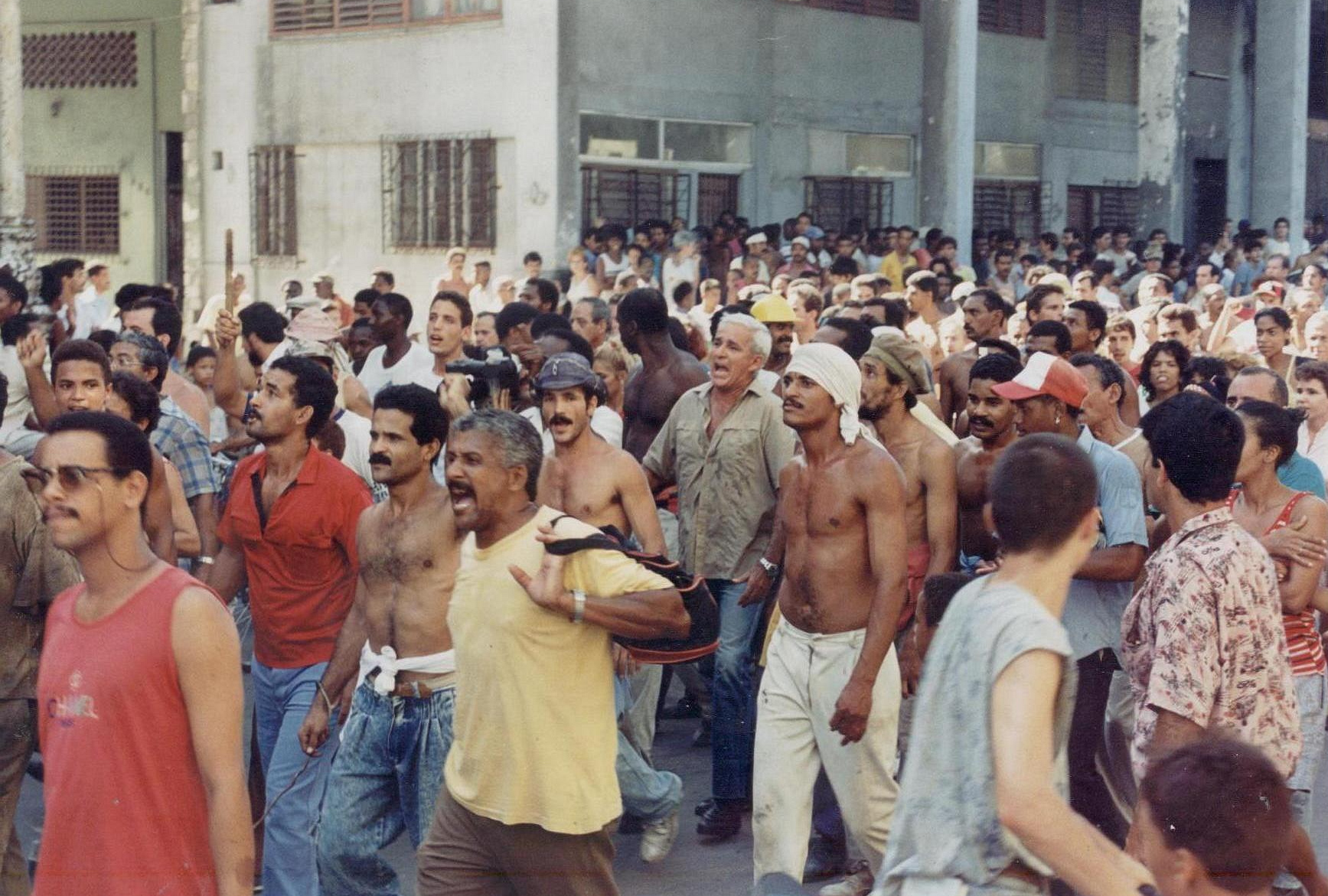
Maleconazo protesters in Havana (August 5, 1994)

After the dissolution of the Soviet Union and Comecon, Cuba experienced a massive economic crisis, during which many goods and services that had been available since the beginning of the 20th century. It led to rare anti-communist protests known as Maleconazo on 5 August 1994. The Cuban police blocked people from boarding tugboats leaving Havana, prompting thousands of citizens to storm the streets in the largest anti-government demonstration Cuba had seen since the Cuban Revolution. In the following weeks, Fidel Castro quelled the frustration by opening the doors of the country and allowing Cubans to leave, which had a significant impact on Cuba's relationship with the United States moving forward. That caused the subsequent Balsero crisis in the United States. The situation improved towards the end of the decade once Hugo Chávez's Venezuela emerged as Cuba's primary trading partner and diplomatic ally, and especially after the year 2000, once Cuba–Russia relations improved under the presidency of Vladimir Putin.

== Leaders of Cuba since 1959 ==
Leaders of the Republic of Cuba since 1959
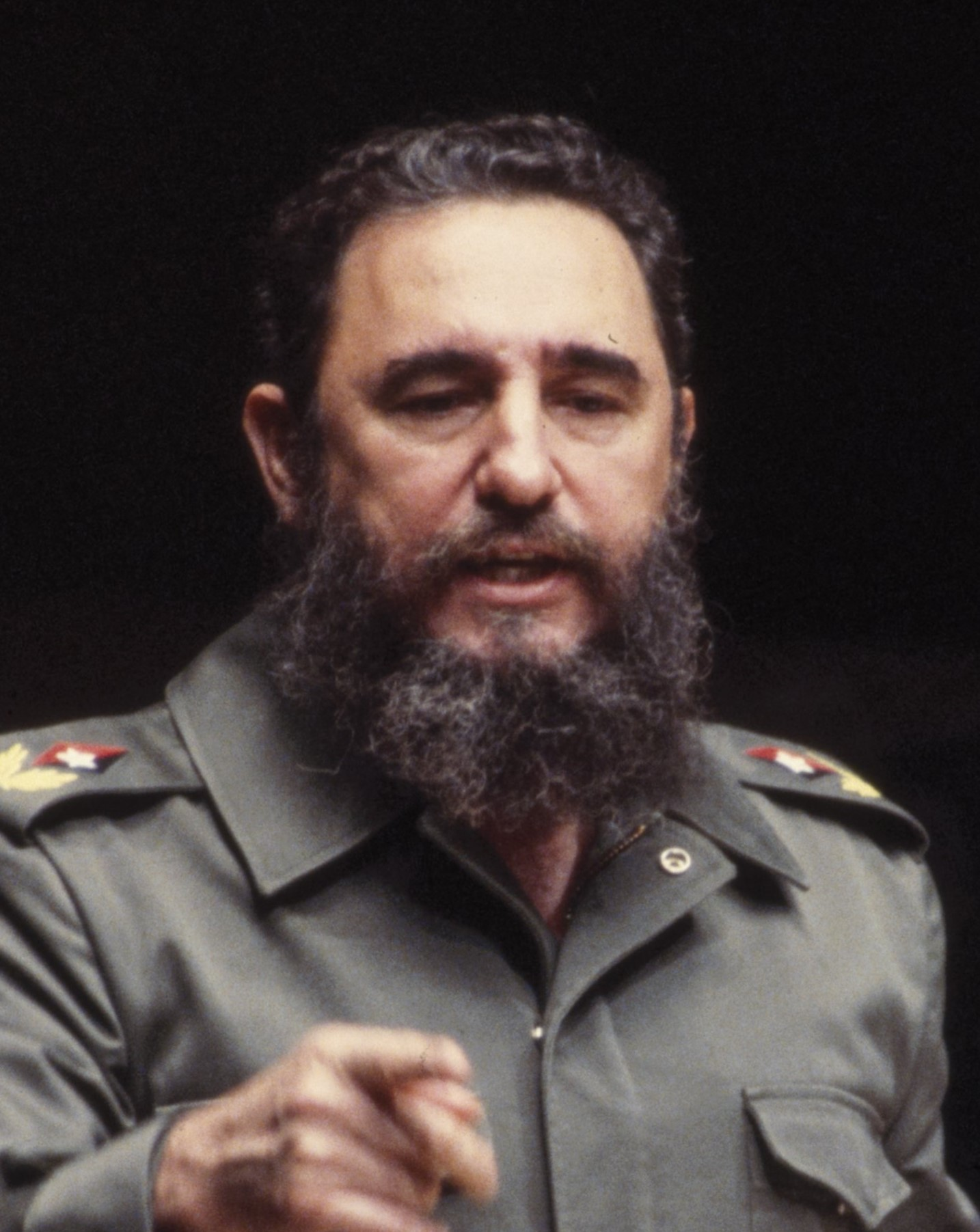
Fidel Castro (1959–2011)

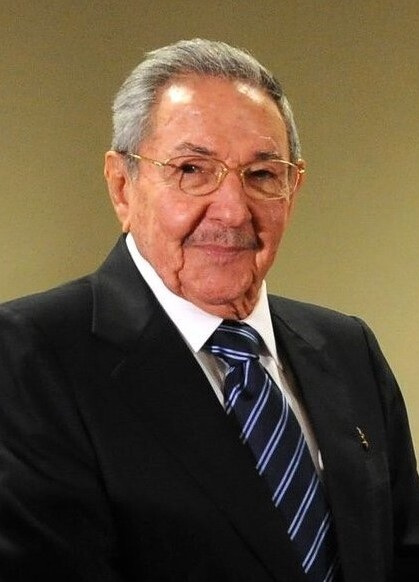
Raúl Castro (2011–2021)

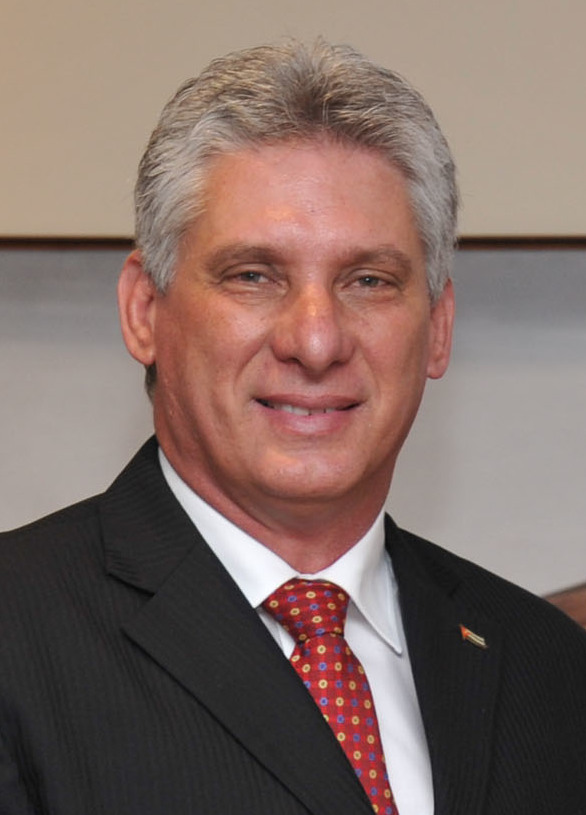
Miguel Díaz-Canel (since 2021)
