= Integrated Revolutionary Organizations =

Cuban political organization

The Integrated Revolutionary Organizations (Organizaciones Revolucionarias Integradas, ORI) was a political organization in Cuba formed in July 1961 as an intermediate step toward the creation of a unified Marxist–Leninist party. It merged Fidel Castro's 26th of July Movement, the Revolutionary Directorate of 13 March Movement, and the Popular Socialist Party (PSP), the island's pre-revolution Communist party. The ORI was intended to become the United Party of the Socialist Revolution (PURSC) and eventually the Communist Party of Cuba. A National Directorate governed the ORI, dominated by a six-member secretariat with Fidel Castro as first secretary and his brother Raúl as second. In March 1962, a public dispute over "sectarianism" pitted the old-line PSP leadership against Castro and the newer revolutionary forces, leading to the denunciation and purge of organizational secretary Aníbal Escalante and a reorganization of the ORI into the PURSC.

== Formation and structure ==
The ORI was established in July 1961, merging the 26th of July Movement, the Revolutionary Directorate, and the Popular Socialist Party. The organization was intended to become the PURSC once the leadership judged it sufficiently organized and entrenched to act as the single party in a Communist state. The PSP, which had a limited role in the armed insurrection against Fulgencio Batista, nevertheless gained disproportionate influence within the new organization; ten of its members were appointed to the twenty-five-member National Directorate, while the Revolutionary Directorate received only two seats. Aníbal Escalante, a longtime PSP official with close ties to Moscow, was placed in charge of the ORI's organization. From the outset, this arrangement produced tension between the PSP's veteran cadres and the younger revolutionaries of the 26th of July Movement and Revolutionary Directorate, many of whom found themselves excluded from party and state positions.

As of July 1962, according to a Central Intelligence Agency memorandum, the ORI was governed by a 24-man National Directorate dominated by a six-man secretariat headed by Fidel and Raúl Castro as first and second secretaries; Raúl Castro, also deputy premier, was second to his brother in both party and government hierarchies. Veteran Communists held nine of the 24 seats and occupied key administrative posts, including the presidency of the Agrarian Reform Institute (Carlos Rafael Rodríguez) and the Ministry of Domestic Trade; Blas Roca, the ranking Cuban Communist for over 25 years, sat on the secretariat and directed the ORI newspaper Hoy. Major government decrees were issued jointly in the names of the Council of Ministers and the ORI national leadership beginning in August 1961. In late 1961, The New York Times reported that the ORI had become "a shadow government and the actual power in Cuba," with Castro holding the positions of premier and secretary general.

== March 1962 "sectarianism" crisis ==
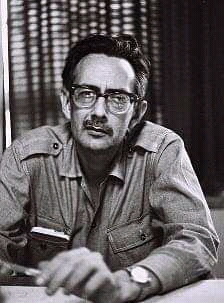
Aníbal Escalante, denounced by Castro for "sectarianism" in March 1962.

On 26 March 1962, Fidel Castro delivered a televised speech in which he sharply attacked "sectarianism" and bureaucracy within the ORI, singling out Aníbal Escalante as responsible for building a personal power apparatus. The speech marked the public outbreak of what became known as the Escalante affair. Castro portrayed the dispute as a conflict between an entrenched PSP old guard and the broader revolutionary movement, accusing the old-line leadership of monopolizing the ORI apparatus and alienating the masses. Castro accused Escalante of turning the ORI into "a straitjacket, a yoke," and an "army of tamed and submissive revolutionists," rather than a genuinely unified party. In the speech, Castro described how the PSP's provincial and local general secretaries had automatically become the ORI's general secretaries at each level under Escalante's direction, creating a system of control divorced from the masses. He announced that Escalante had been removed from his post and that the National Directorate would be expanded to include more representatives of the revolutionary groups that had been marginalized by the PSP old guard.

Escalante was expelled from the ORI National Directorate and left for Czechoslovakia. Other veteran Communists, including Blas Roca, publicly endorsed Castro's condemnation of Escalante, and Moscow, while sympathetic to the veteran Communists, also supported Castro and condemned Escalante's tactics. Following the speech, provincial ORI directorates in at least Matanzas and Oriente provinces were reorganized, with veteran Communists replaced by "new" Communists associated with the Castro brothers.

== Dissolution ==
According to French Communist René Andrieu, the 1962 Escalante affair "jeopardized and delayed" the planned unification of Cuban revolutionary forces into a single Communist party; the Communist Party of Cuba was not established until 1965. The ORI was superseded by the PURSC, and in 1965 the PURSC became the Communist Party of Cuba.
