= Great Debate (Cuba) =

Cuban socialist economic debate (1962–1965)

- 1962–1965
Four Year Plan	Revolutionary Offensive
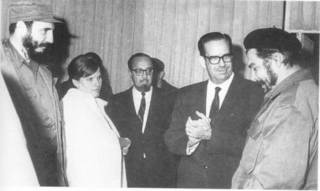
- Che Guevara stands at the far right, while meeting with his chief ideological opponent Carlos Rafael Rodríguez, who stands in the center, at the Havana airport, 1965. Fidel Castro and Aleida March stand to the left, and Osvaldo Dorticós Torrado stands center right.
- Location: Cuba
- Leader(s): Che Guevara, Carlos Rafael Rodríguez

The Great Debate was an era in Cuban history retroactively named by historians, that was defined by public debate about the future of Cuban economic policy that took place from 1962 to 1965. The debate began after Cuba fell into an economic crisis in 1962 after years of internal economic complications, United States sanctions, and the flight of professionals from Cuba. In 1962 Fidel Castro invited Marxist economists around the world to debate two main propositions. One proposition proposed by Che Guevara was that Cuba could bypass any capitalist then "socialist" transition period and immediately become an industrialized "communist" society if "subjective conditions" like public consciousness and vanguard action are perfected. The other proposition held by the Popular Socialist Party was that Cuba required a transitionary period as a mixed economy in which Cuba's sugar economy was maximized for profit before a "communist" society could be established.

The Great Debate would result in somewhat of a compromise in which Fidel Castro used moral incentives rather than material incentives to motivate workers, and industrialization would be ignored in favor of a focus on the sugar economy. These policies would eventually culminate in the Revolutionary Offensive where the economy would be oriented in producing 10 million tons of sugar by 1970. The campaign failed and led to a reorientation of domestic Cuban politics.

== Background ==
=== Political consolidation ===
In the months following the Cuban Revolution a pluralistic political alliance assembled to form the first provisional government. After elections failed to materialize, Batistianos were executed in the national sports stadium, and appeals for agrarian reform became popular, more moderate politicians started to become disillusioned in the government and believed communists were slowly gaining control. By late 1959 the Central Intelligence Agency began training exiled Cubans for an invasion of Cuba. In early 1960 the Cuban government entered into a trade deal with the Soviet Union that exchanged Cuban sugar for Soviet oil. Throughout 1960 the United States would begin to create sanctions on Cuba and the Cuban government would retaliate by nationalizing American owned businesses. By 1961 U.S. trained rebels would attempt the Bay of Pigs Invasion and fail to overthrow the Castro government in Cuba. The original pluralistic platform of the Cuban Revolution had by then been constricted to just socialists sympathetic to the Eastern Bloc. By 1962 the Cuban government was reorganized under one political organization headed by Popular Socialist Party leader Anibal Escalante.

=== Four Year Plan ===
Starting in 1961, Guevara spearheaded a Four Year Plan to rapidly industrialize the Cuban economy, and minimize the sugar industry in favor of other agricultural sectors. The plan was designed to be carried out from 1962 to 1965, but was cancelled early in 1964 due to economic setbacks.

Agricultural diversification led to a steep drop in sugar production. Industrialization goals were also not reached because machinery which was typically imported from the United States, was prevented from being imported due to the embargo. Cuba also lacked the necessary educated technicians. Falling sugar profits and expanding social services also contributed to economic failure. As sugar profits fell, and social services increased, Cuba needed greater consumer goods to give to the poor, but could not provide them due to reduced national profits.

In March 1962, Guevara admitted in a speech that the economic plan was a failure, specifically stating it was "an absurd plan, disconnected from reality, with absurd goals and imaginary resources."

=== Escalante affair ===
By 1962 Cuba was entering an economic crisis, and recently experienced the Escalante affair in which it was revealed that Anibal Escalante had given most positions of power in the new Integrated Revolutionary Organizations to Popular Socialist Party members. The economic crisis spurred on a reevaluation of the economic models proposed at the time and the previous Escalante affair motivated distrust in the Popular Socialist Party and their Soviet modeled propositions.

== Debate ==
In 1962 leftist economists from all over the world were invited to print their opinions in economic journals in Cuba about how Cuba should develop into a communist society. The two main spokespeople in the debate were Che Guevara who argued for an independent Cuban model to communism, and Carlos Rafael Rodríguez of the Popular Socialist Party who advocated for more of a "soviet" model towards communism which meant a development of capitalism before socialism and later communism.

Rodriguez advocated for material incentives given to individuals based on how well they created profit for an enterprise. Enterprises themselves will be "self-managed" like in the Soviet Union, rather than all managed by a central planner.

Guevara's view was that the Soviet system had developed following the historical contingency of the New Economic Policy, rather than objective Marxist principles. Guevara advocated for moral incentives as the main motivator to increase workers' production. The main ideal that compromised the consciousness that would develop socialism was the praise of the New Man, a citizen that was only motivated by human solidarity and self-sacrifice. According to Guevara's view, the state should undermine the law of value and encourage voluntarism to develop a sense of social duty among the people.

All profits created by enterprises were to be given to the state budget, and the state budget would cover losses. Institutions that developed socialist consciousness were regarded as the most important element in maintaining a path to socialism rather than materially incentivized increases in production. Implementation of the profit-motive was regarded as a path towards capitalism and was one of the flaws of the Eastern bloc economies. The economy would also rely on mass mobilizations and centralized planning as a method for developing the economy.

The Great Debate came to an end when Guevara left Cuba in 1965. Initially, his view lost support. In 1968, however, Fidel Castro announced the reforms of the Revolutionary Offensive which drew on Guevara's ideas.

== Aftermath ==
In 1966 the Cuban economy was reorganized on moral lines. Cuban propaganda stressed voluntarism and ideological motivations to increase productions. Material incentives were not given to workers who were more productive than others. Cuban intellectuals were expected to participate actively in creating a positive national ethos and ignore any desire to create "art for art's sake".

Cuba became more politically independent from the Soviet Union and instead focused it's foreign policy on third-world affairs. Guerilla groups in third-world anti-imperialist struggles would receive funding from the Cuban government.

In 1968 all non-agricultural private businesses were nationalized, central planning was done more on an ad-hoc basis and the entire Cuban economy was directed at producing a 10 million ton sugar harvest. These developments were generally inspired by the resolutions brought about by the Great Debate years earlier. The focus on sugar would eventually render all other facets of the Cuban economy underdeveloped and would be the ultimate legacy of the offensive.

== See also ==
- Economy of Cuba
- Consolidation of the Cuban Revolution
- New Economic Policy
