= Great Debate =

Great Debate may refer to

- The Great Debate, also called the Samye Debate, the Council of Lhasa or the Council of Samye, a decisive debate in Tibetan Buddhism from 792 to 794.
- The Great Debates of 1858, the Lincoln–Douglas debates.
- Great Debates (international relations), a series of disagreements between international relations scholars.
- The Great Debate, a national discussion in the United Kingdom about state education, touched off by a 1976 speech by Prime Minister James Callaghan.
- Great Debate (Cuba), a debate in Cuba about how to transform the economy from 1962 to 1965.
- The Great Debate, a series of letters and polemics between the Chinese Communist Party and the Communist Party of the Soviet Union from 1956 to 1963, during the Sino-Soviet Split.

== Science ==
- Great Debate (astronomy), an influential debate between the astronomers Harlow Shapley and Heber Curtis.

== Media ==
- The Great Debate (Canadian TV series), a Canadian television series (1974–1983).
- "The Great Debate", a song by Dream Theater from their 2002 album Six Degrees of Inner Turbulence.
- The Great Debate (American TV series), a VH1 program (2009).
- The Great Debate (British TV series), a Sky News programme (2022–present).

== Literature ==
- The Great Debate: Edmund Burke, Thomas Paine, and the Birth of Right and Left, a 2014 book by Yuval Levin.
