= Escalante affair =

Political incident in Cuba

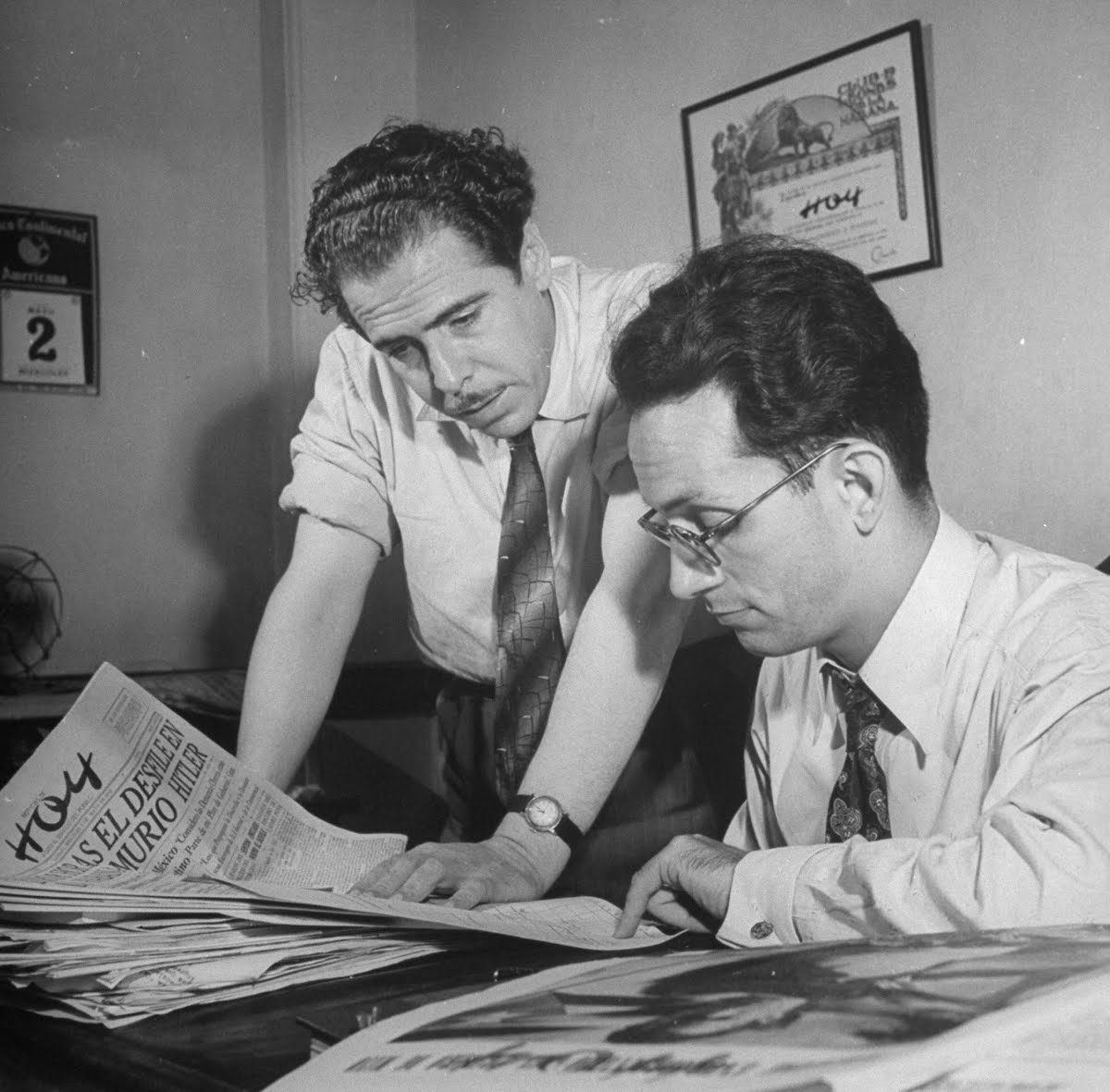
Aníbal Escalante (left)

The Escalante affair was a political incident in Cuba after politician Anibal Escalante gave his comrades in the Popular Socialist Party positions of authority over the general members in the newly formed Integrated Revolutionary Organizations, causing Fidel Castro to dismiss him and his compatriots from the IRO.

The origins of the affair lie in the decision to create a vanguard party in Cuba by combining the 26th of July Movement, Directorio Revolucionario Estudiantil, and Popular Socialist Party into the newly formed Integrated Revolutionary Organizations. The creation of the ORI in 1962 was entrusted to PSP executive secretary Anibal Escalante, who used this opportunity to place PSP executives in positions of power and then purge the army of old guerrilla leaders, and speed up agrarian reforms which caused an economic decline. These actions were unpopular in the country causing Fidel Castro to condemn the ORI and order for its restructuring.

== Background ==
In the period immediately following the 1959 success of the Cuban revolution, Aníbal Escalante occupied a leading role in the Popular Socialist Party. However, its Marxist orthodoxy and history of cooperation with the deposed government of Fulgencio Batista gave it a skeptical public reputation. Largely sidelined in national politics, Escalante and the PSP took a backseat to Fidel Castro and his 26 July Movement.

Following the Bay of Pigs invasion in April 1961, Cuba appealed to the Soviet Union for military assistance. In exchange for aid, the PSP was merged with the 26 July Movement and the Revolutionary Directorate of 13 March into the Integrated Revolutionary Organizations (ORI), predecessor to the Communist Party of Cuba, and Escalante, who enjoyed support from Moscow, elevated to its secretary. According to Juanita Castro, some referred to this period as the "Anibalato". Juanita Castro noted that, during this period, "his picture ran in the papers more frequently than Fidel's and more Escalante people were finding their way into positions of power."

In the fall of 1961 Castro began asking the Soviet Union for more anti-aircraft missiles, but Khrushchev did not immediately respond. In the interval Castro criticized the USSR for lacking "revolutionary boldness" and began talks with China about economic assistance.

At first Fidel Castro ignored the emerging power structure within the ORI. Soon after an economic decline that introduced food rations in Cuba, the re-emergence of anti-government guerrillas in the Escambray mountains, and Escalante's disagreement with Guevara's plan to export the Cuban revolution, Castro soon denounced Escalante and the ORI's structure.

== Affair ==
In March 1962, Anibal Escalante and practically all of his appointed pro-Moscow officials were fired. Escalante himself was fired on 22 March 1962. He was not officially fired by Fidel Castro but by the ORI itself on Castro's insistence. Anibal Escalante was then sent into exile in Moscow. The other PSP appointees were simply censured and deprived of their positions. Only those who swore total allegiance to Castro were allowed to remain in government.

Escalante was widely considered an "old line communist," and accused of building a party disconnected from the people. In a speech on March 26 of that year, Castro described Escalante as "having promoted the sectarian spirit to its highest possible level, of having promoted an organization which he controlled ... he simply allowed himself to be blinded by personal ambition." In a 1966 interview with an Egyptian magazine, meanwhile, Che Guevara said that Escalante had used his office to fill party positions with friends and colleagues who enjoyed "various privileges - beautiful secretaries, Cadillac cars, air-conditioning."

A cable from the Polish embassy in Havana to that nation's foreign ministry, meanwhile, gave the following account of Escalante's purge which it reported had been provided to it by Blas Roca:

motives [for the removal of Anibal Escalante were as follows]: as an organizational secretary of the ORI, A. E. used brutal and arbitrary methods of management, as well as intrigues aimed at concentrating control in his hands over the party and national apparatus. He used these methods towards other comrades regardless of their previous organizational membership [that is, whether they belonged to the former Popular Socialist Party or the "26th of July Movement"]. He managed to [take] control of a series of ministries, among others, the Ministry of Internal Affairs; he undertook the steps in order to control the military cadres.

== Reactions ==
=== Domestic ===
The ouster of Escalante resulted in a relaxation of the "Stalinist atmosphere" that had been developing in Cuba over the preceding months. The ORI was eventually renamed the United Party of the Cuban Socialist Revolution. In order to ensure the minimalizing of PSP Stalinists in positions of party authority, assemblies were called in workplaces to vote in new candidates for party membership.

The tendency towards institutionalization was ended and superseded by a political atmosphere surrounding Castro as a domineering single personality. In Cuban political culture PSP Stalinists became unpopular and past combat service in the 26th of July Movement during the Cuban Revolution became a source of trustworthiness and legitimacy.

By 1962 Cuba was entering an economic crisis due to the rising sanctions it had experienced since 1959, the inability of the private sector to participate in the new mixed economy, and the flight of Cuban professionals who were uncomfortable with the political developments in Cuba. The economic crisis spurred on a reevaluation of the economic models proposed at the time, and the Escalante affair of that year motivated distrust in the Popular Socialist Party and their Soviet modeled propositions.

=== International ===
The affair alarmed the Soviet leadership who feared a loss of good relations with Cuba. Soviet leadership was also growing to fear a possible U.S. invasion of Cuba. In this crisis of international relations the Soviet Union sent more SA-2 anti-aircraft missiles in April as well as a regiment of regular soviet troops.

Timothy Naftali has contended that Escalante's dismissal was a motivating factor behind the Soviet decision to place nuclear missiles in Cuba in 1962. According to Naftali, Soviet foreign policy planners were concerned that Castro's break with Escalante foreshadowed a Cuban drift toward China and sought to solidify the Soviet-Cuban relationship through the missile basing program.
