= United Party of the Socialist Revolution of Cuba =

Communist party active in Cuba from 1962 to 1965

United Party of the Socialist Revolution of Cuba Partido Unido de la Revolución Socialista de Cuba
- First Secretary: Fidel Castro
- Founded: March 26, 1962
- Dissolved: October 3, 1965
- Preceded by: Integrated Revolutionary Organizations
- Succeeded by: Communist Party of Cuba
- Newspaper: Hoy; Revolución
- Membership: 50,000 (1965)
- Ideology: Communism; Marxism–Leninism; Revolutionary socialism Fidelismo; Guevarism
- Political position: Far-left

Party flag
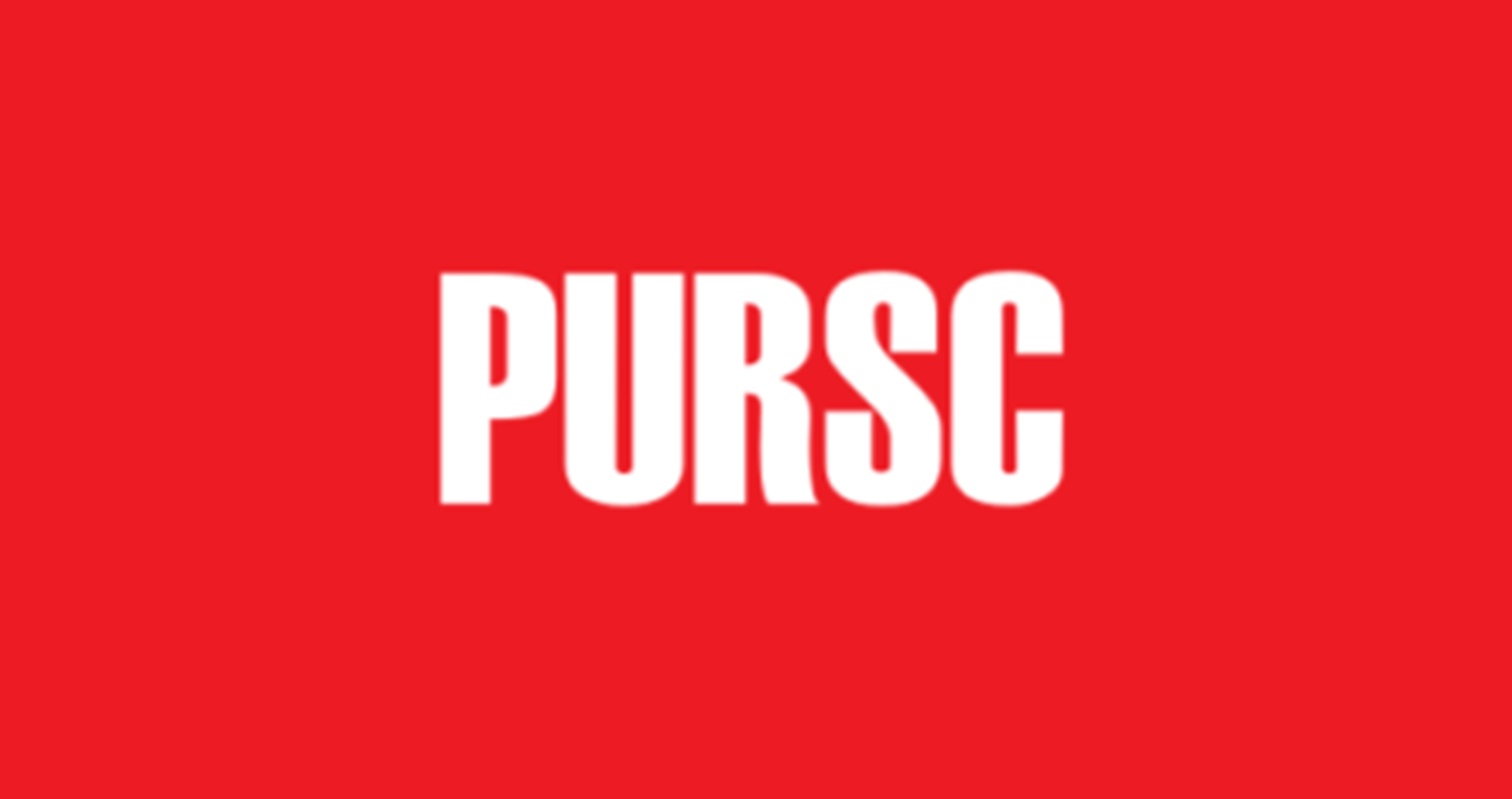

The United Party of the Socialist Revolution of Cuba (Partido Unido de la Revolución Socialista de Cuba, PURSC) was a short-lived Marxist-Leninist vanguard party in Cuba, formed in 1962 from the Integrated Revolutionary Organizations (ORI). It was the direct predecessor of the Communist Party of Cuba (PCC), which was constituted in October 1965. The PURSC emerged after a sectarianism crisis within the ORI, and its construction was based on a "mass method" of selecting exemplary workers as party members. On 3 October 1965, it was reorganized as the Communist Party of Cuba, with a newly constituted Central Committee, Political Bureau, and Secretariat.

== Origins and formation ==
Following the Cuban Revolution's victory in January 1959, three revolutionary organizations that had opposed the Batista dictatorship remained active: the 26th of July Movement (M-26-7), led by Fidel Castro; the Popular Socialist Party (PSP), the pre-revolution communist party; and the March 13 Revolutionary Directorate, a student-based group. The broader revolutionary tradition from which the PURSC emerged included José Martí's Cuban Revolutionary Party, which later even the party itself regarded as a direct ideological antecedent. In July 1961 these groups merged into the Integrated Revolutionary Organizations (ORI), a transitional body intended to lay the groundwork for a unified party. However, construction of the ORI was dominated by former PSP members under Aníbal Escalante, who packed the new organization with his old comrades and excluded many veterans of the M-26-7 and the Revolutionary Directorate. The ORI's sectarian practices, which included arbitrary appointments and privilege, alienated broad sectors of the population and provoked a political crisis by early 1962.

On 26 March 1962, following Castro's public denunciation of Escalante and the ORI's sectarianism, the organization was renamed the United Party of the Socialist Revolution of Cuba (PURSC), according to the PCC's official history.

After the ORI was dismantled, the party was rebuilt through a systematic process of "reorganization and purification," in which members were selected by the "mass method" instead of being appointed from above.

== Organization and membership selection ==
Under the PURSC, party membership was determined through what Castro called the "mass method." In workplaces, assemblies of workers nominated "exemplary workers"; after discussion and a vote, those approved were investigated by a party commission before admission. This system was intended to ensure that the party was rooted in the working class and avoided the privilege and bureaucratic elitism of the ORI. The method was later applied in the armed forces, with the eastern mountain region serving as an initial model under the direction of Raúl Castro.

Despite these efforts, party building was slow. Membership figures from the period show gradual growth: approximately 2,100 members in 1962, rising to about 16,000 in 1963, 35,500 in 1964, and 50,000 by 1965. The party remained far smaller, per capita, than other ruling communist parties, and by the late 1960s only a minority of Cuban work centers had a party nucleus.

== Political role and limitations ==
From its inception, the PURSC focused its activities on the economic sphere, stimulating productivity, socialist emulation, and voluntary labor at the workplace level. It was assigned broader responsibilities only in 1965, including overseeing administration of key economic sectors and mobilizing the workforce. However, the party's organizational weakness and shortage of skilled cadres hampered these tasks. Its attempts to fight bureaucracy and supervise state administration met resistance, and by the late 1960s the party had become, in the words of scholar William M. LeoGrande, "an 'administrative party' neglecting its 'political work.'"

Internal tensions also persisted within the new party. In 1959, the Revolutionary Directorate had suspected Marcos Rodríguez of betraying four of its leaders after the 1957 Humboldt 7 massacre. At that time the Popular Socialist Party, of which Rodríguez had already become a member, protested his innocence; since the Revolutionary Directorate could furnish no evidence against him, Rodríguez was freed. When he was arrested again in 1961, the case was reopened, and he received support from Joaquín Ordoqui, a founding PSP member and vice minister of the armed forces. In 1963 Rodríguez confessed and claimed he had confided his actions to Ordoqui as early as 1958. At the 1964 trial, DR veterans, led by Faure Chomón, charged the PSP as an organization with responsibility for the betrayal. The affair exposed lingering distrust between veterans of the PSP and the other revolutionary groups. Although Rodríguez was convicted and sentenced to death, the affair threatened to reopen the divisions that the PURSC had been created to overcome, and Castro intervened personally to reaffirm unity.

== Transition to the Communist Party of Cuba ==
During 1965 the PURSC strengthened its provincial, regional, and municipal organs, and on 30 September–1 October a meeting of the party's top leadership took place. On 2 October, the first meeting of the newly constituted Central Committee was held, at which a Political Bureau, Secretariat, and work commissions were elected. The following day, 3 October 1965, in a ceremony at the Karl Marx Theatre in Havana, the decisions were publicly announced: the newspapers Hoy and Revolución were merged into Granma, which became the official organ of the party, and the party's name was changed to the Communist Party of Cuba (PCC). During the ceremony, Castro read the farewell letter of Che Guevara, who was absent from the Central Committee because he had already left Cuba to fight in other lands.

With these steps, the PURSC ceased to exist, and the Communist Party of Cuba was formally constituted, marking what official Cuban histories describe as the conclusion of the party-building process that had begun in 1961.

== Bibliography ==
- Pateman, Joe; Pateman, John (2023). "Why Has Marxism-Leninism Succeeded in Cuba?". International Journal of Cuban Studies. 15 (2): 235–260. JSTOR 48810860.
- LeoGrande, William M. (November 1979). "Party Development in Revolutionary Cuba". Journal of Interamerican Studies and World Affairs. 21 (4): 457–480. JSTOR 165601.
