= Firefighting in Cuba =

A fire station in Havana

Firefighting in Cuba is operated by the Cuban Fire Corps (Cuerpo de Bomberos de Cuba), a subset of the Ministry of the Interior (MININT). Cuba is home to both volunteer and professional firefighters, as well as conscripts fulfilling their military service.

== History ==
Firefighting in Cuba began during the colonial era on November 13, 1696, in Santa Clara. Following various fires, the community agreed to pay for firefighting equipment and water pumps to fight the fires, on a volunteer basis. The first hand pumps were brought to Havana in 1795, where they were operated by enslaved blacks. After the establishment of the first firefighting group in Santa Clara, another was established in Batabanó in 1798. Then, on January 14, 1831, a corps of firefighters was established in Santiago. This was followed by the establishment of the Santa Clara Fire Department in 1832. The same year, a Professional Corps of Civil Firefighters (Cuerpo Profesional de Bomberos Civiles) was established in Cárdenas. In 1835, the Corps of Honorable Workers and Firefighters of Havana (Cuerpo de Honrados Obreros y Bomberos) was established. One year later came the Commerce Firefighters of Matanzas and Cienfuegos, who were in turn followed by the establishment of various fire brigades across the island. The first horse-drawn steam pump came to Havana on June 6, 1855.

On September 12, 1963, the National Firefighters School or ENB (Escuela Nacional de Bomberos) opened in La Lisa, and in 1965, the first conscripts joined the school. The school has since graduated over 10,000 people.

Isasi Fire
- Date: May 17, 1890
- Location: Havana, Cuba; 23°08′18″N 82°21′00″W
- Type: Fire / Explosion
- Deaths: 38

=== Isasi Fire ===
On the night of Saturday, May 17, 1890, a fire broke out at a hardware store owned by Juan Isasi (also spelled 'Isassi') at the corner of Mercaderes and Lamparilla streets in Old Havana. The owner's refusal to provide information, coupled with the large amount of dynamite he was secretly hiding in his store, ended up leading to a series of explosions that caused the deaths of 17 commerce firefighters, 8 municipal firefighters, 4 public service officers, 8 citizens, and a member of the navy. In total, 38 people died.

== Training and membership ==
Typically, fire training can begin at 16 as long as parents sign taking responsibility. On paper, prospective firefighters have to be at least 18 and have finished 12th grade to join, however in practice, this rule isn't always followed.

Many of Cuba's firefighters are conscripts serving during their mandatory military service. Many conscripts are sent to work in the fire service, sometimes lacking protective equipment, safety measures, and proper training. Cuban conscription law bans the refusal of such orders. Cuban authorities typically do not release information pertaining to incidents during mandatory military service, fatal or not.

Protective equipment in a fire station in rural Cuba

Cuba also has volunteer firefighters. They operate under the umbrella of the Cuban Volunteer Firefighter Association (Asociación de Bomberos Voluntarios de Cuba), which was founded on December 23, 1986, as an additional organizational unit to the Cuban fire service. Methods of reaching volunteers can be uneven, and they sometimes have to mobilize themselves.

== Challenges ==
Many areas lack firefighters; as of 2010, the province of Artemisa only had 22 professional firefighters, 8 soldiers in the military service, and 37 volunteer auxiliaries, covering a province of 1,546.06 sq mi (4,004.3 km^{2}) with half a million people. Firefighting equipment in Cuba is often old, and departments sometimes rely on equipment donations from other countries such as Russia. Vehicles frequently lack water and proper equipment, and response times are often long.

Aside from the lack of operational fire trucks and adequate equipment, fire brigades are often affected by fuel shortages, which can leave firefighters no choice but to find other ways to arrive on scene.
