= Conscription in Cuba =

Conscription is inscribed in the Cuban constitution, stating that "Defense of the socialist homeland is the greatest honor and the supreme duty of every Cuban citizen." There is a military presence through all levels of education in Cuba. The recruiting process begins in secondary school, with males and females able to enlist in the army from the age of 17.

Conscription is prominent in Cuba's military history as it assists in the understanding of how they built and internally strengthened their martial apparatus. Particularly the establishment of the Cuban Revolutionary Armed Forces in 1959 when Fidel Castro took power saw a systematic restructuring of Cuban defence forces, with a focus on mobilising a large army. Conscription became an important element in assembling what became the second largest standing military in Latin America throughout the late 1970s to the late 1980s, behind Brazil.

Defining historical events, such as the Angolan Civil War, occurred while conscription was a prominent factor in Cuba's military system. The Revolutionary Armed Forces initiated an extensive military intervention in order to assist the leftist People's Movement for the Liberation of Angola (MPLA). Upon the dispatch of Cuban troops to Angola in 1975, conscription had allowed the Cuban armed forces to grow to 117,000 personnel.

The Revolutionary Armed Forces worked towards professionalising the troops by rewarding military development with higher ranks and positions, modernising their military body by training specialised forces, and promoting the development of knowledge and skill. This assisted in the expansion of their conscription-based army as it portrayed strength and experience to opposing military forces.

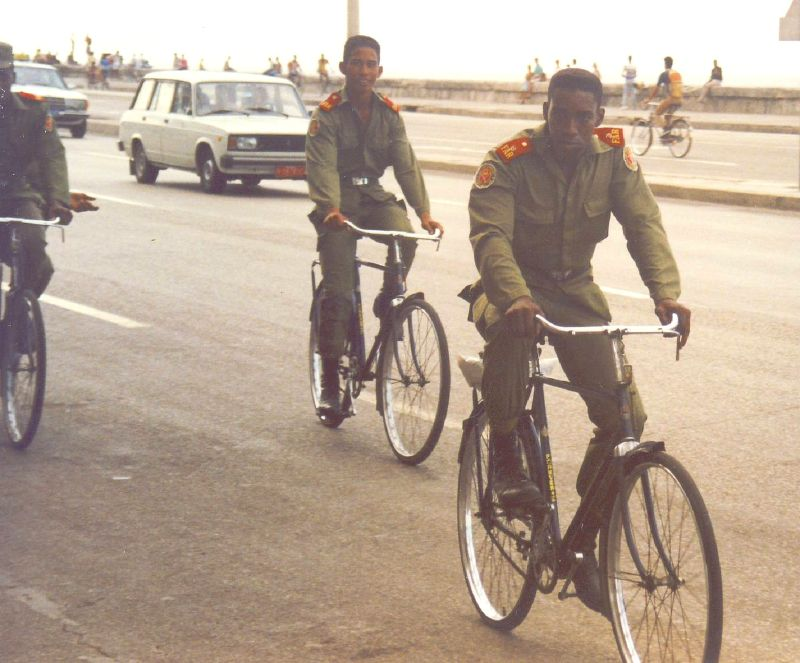
Cuban military on the move.

== Cuban conscription until 1991 ==
Cuban nationals were required to serve under the Obligatory Military Service (SMO) system. Under this structure, it was compulsory to complete three years in military service, the militias of territorial troops, or the brigades of production and defence. The SMO was reinforced by the first Law of Military service in November 1963.

Despite the more modern inception of conscription in Cuba, discussion of the policy date back to 1869, when the New York Times reported that there was discussion in Havana that conscription would be put in place. Despite this attempt not being fulfilled, it was still reported that it was popular throughout the whole population. From a foreign affairs perspective, it was perceived as an attempt to gain control of Cuban affairs, which they were struggling to secure due to external intervention by international counterparts. It was also not a well-received policy internationally, with the article predicting that Cuba would find a large increase in outward-bound passengers trying to avoid the obligatory service.

In 1963, the establishment of the SMO immediately benefited the Cuban Revolutionary Armed Forces as they had a mass influx of troops with diverse skill sets, which allowed for a more experienced army. It benefited the nation as it expanded the Cuban workforce as production workers came under the authority of the military. The services that were available to enlist into under conscription were vast and therefore could cater to certain skillsets. For example, The Special Battalion of Roads were provided with construction equipment such as bulldozers and tractors to help strengthen Cuba's infrastructure. The members of this military unit were predominately made up of conscripts.

Under this policy, those who enlisted could remain in the military reserves from 1 January of their sixteenth year of age to 31 December of their fiftieth year of age. Under conscription, those who completed their active military service were transferred into the reserves, where they were required to complete annual training until the age of 50. Of these conscripts, those who were in active military service were called "military men". Those who remained in the reserves were called "reservists". Those between the ages of 16 and 28 who had enlisted but had not yet been called to active military service were called "Prerecruits".

In August 1973, the introduction of the Law of Social Service outlined that those who had completed their studies at an institution of higher education, in areas including technical, scientific or cultural studies, were required to complete their three years of conscripted military service in military divisions that employed their specialised knowledge and skill.

== Reduction in personnel ==
Upon the Cuban Revolution in 1959, Cuba became increasingly reliant on Soviet political, economic and military aid, becoming their ally for the Cold War. The strength and build-up of personnel in the Cuban army in the 1970s and 1980s, facilitated strongly by their conscription policy, was largely aided and enabled by the military support of the Soviet Union. Thus, when the Soviet Union dissolved in 1991 and consequently a loss of an ally, Cuba were unable to support the large military infrastructure that they had built.

By 1995, the Cuban army had been reduced by half, leaving them with 105,000 active military personnel. It is evident that a lot of the restructuring which the Cuban military system endured began predominately when the Soviet Union withdrew their aid for Cuba. Without the financial and military source that the Soviets provided, Cuba did not have the facilities or resources to maintain the sheer size of their personnel and the strength of their policies. In 1991, the year that Soviet support dissolved, Cuba altered and reduced the requirements of their conscription policy.

== 1991–present conscription policy ==
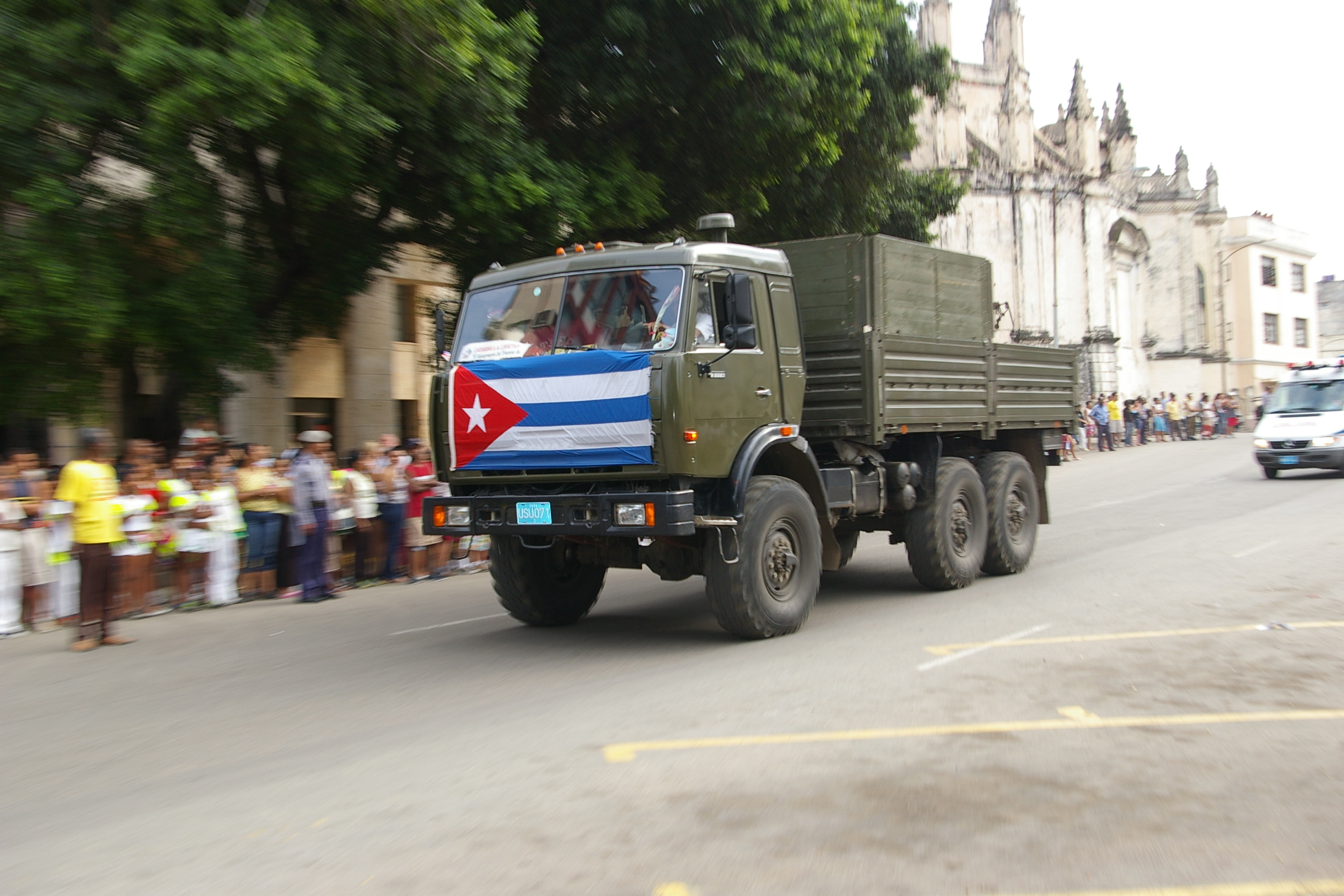
A Cuban military truck in Havana

In August 1991, the SMO changed to the General Military Service Law and the requirements of active military service were reduced to two years, with enlistment being obligatory between the ages of 16 and 28. Most nationals were not called to service until they were 17. The explanation that was provided to justify this reduction was that the level of skill and education had improved greatly amongst enlistees and that less training was needed. Another plausible explanation is that a reduced need for immediate military mobilisation influenced the decrease in obligatory service.

In periods of rest, when the demand for military resources was low, troops are able to join the army reserves. They are also transferred to the reserves once the individual has completed their obligatory service. In this position they are able to be called upon to complete a multitude of tasks for the army until they turn 45 years old.

The transfer of power from Fidel Castro to his brother Raúl Castro in 2006 led to global discussion about a shift away from communism in Cuba, resulting in a potential restructuring of military. This restructuring would mean the possible removal of conscription from their policies, and a move towards an all-volunteer force. Cuba has not shifted from communism since the leadership transition, and thus the objectives of their military unit have not changed.

== Alternatives to military service ==
Whilst conscription is a rigid policy within Cuba's military system, there are alternative forms of services which conscripts are able to complete, as long as "the corresponding military training is guaranteed". In 2011, the UN Committee on the Rights of the Child outlined that those in adolescence, who are applicable to be called to action at the age of 18, are able to complete their term of service by participating in duties that are of another nature, such as social or economic roles. Further information regarding what these specific roles are or what the guidelines are in order to complete this alternative service are not provided by the Cuban government.

== Exemption from military service ==
Due to the rigid policies of conscription, those who have been declared mentally or physically handicapped by the recruitment board are the only ones that are exempt from military service. In some cases, Cuban nationals are able to defer their military service in order to complete their service, however are not exempt. Once the conscripts are enlisted in the military and are within active service, they are also granted the opportunity to defer their service if they become incapacitated by a sickness, or they are the sole carer of two or more dependents, who are under 21 years of age.

== Conscientious objection ==
Military law surrounding conscription does not acknowledge any exception for conscientious objection. The importance of a nationalistic commitment to military service is clear, particularly in their constitution which states that, "the defense of the socialist motherland is the greatest honor and the supreme duty of every Cuban." Despite this, there have been many cases reported of Cuban nationals that have attempted to physically harm themselves to exempt them from obligatory service.

These acts were made punishable in Article 171 of the Cuban Penal Code 1987 stating that a "deprivation of freedom for a period from three months to one year or a fine of one hundred to three hundred cuotas" would be imposed if those subject to military service obstruct the completion of someone else's service, or they themselves fail to fulfil the obliged service requirements.

== Disciplinary regulations ==
Those conscripted into active military service, whether they are soldiers or civilian workers, are subject to disciplinary regulation if they violate the terms of their conscription or public order which is strongly enforced by the Cuban Revolutionary Armed Forces (FAR). Whilst there are members of the FAR who have voluntarily enlisted, there is a large portion of their military system that is made up of conscripts. Thus, these disciplinary regulations facilitate the understanding of Cuban Conscription as it monitored their behaviour whilst they were in active and reserved service. Crimes that were considered severe were identified as treason, espionage, cowardice, bribery and fraud.

Particularly cowardice applies to those conscripted in the military service, as these members did not voluntarily enlist, and therefore there have been cases - such as those discussed under 'conscientious objection' - where Cuban nationals have attempted to physically harm themselves in order to exempt them from their military service, something that is punishable by law. Those that were found guilty of committing these crimes were sentenced to: death; incarceration (for crimes that involved violence); fines; and public criticism which acted as a warning. Alternatives to those punishments were also enforced, which included: expulsion from the army; demotion; loss of military rights and benefits; or a loss of property.

== Conscription for women ==
In 1986, the Voluntary Female Military Service was introduced, which allowed women to voluntarily enlist into the military service. Conscription was, consequently, not applicable to women. Once they enlisted, they had to complete a minimum of 2 years of service. Women were able to work up through the ranks that were offered by the Cuban military, however it was understood that they received limited access to the education and experience that facilitated their ability to receive these promotions. It is a requirement that the women who join the army are not pregnant at the time of enlistment and at any point throughout their service.

== See also ==
- Firefighting in Cuba
