= Revolutionary Offensive =

Cuban economic and political campaign

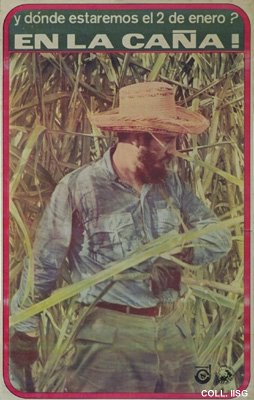
- Poster of Fidel Castro chopping sugar cane promoting the push for a mass sugar harvest.
- Date: 1968-1970
- Location: Cuba
- Outcome: Economic focus on sugar production; Flight of entrepreneurs in the Freedom Flights; Militarization of the economy; Nationalization of all small businesses

The Revolutionary Offensive (Spanish: Ofensiva revolucionaria) was a political campaign in Cuba starting in 1968 to nationalize all remaining private small businesses, which at the time totaled to be about 58,000 small enterprises. The campaign would spur industrialization in Cuba and focus the economy on sugar production, specifically to a deadline for an annual sugar harvest of 10 million tons by 1970. The economic focus on sugar production involved international volunteers and the mobilization of workers from all sectors of the Cuban economy. Economic mobilization also coincided with greater militarization of Cuban political structures and society in general.

By 1970 production in other sectors of the Cuban economy had fallen, and the predicted 10 million ton annual harvest fell short to only 8.5 million. The failure of the 1970 harvest caused officials to reassess the Cuban economy, sacrificing egalitarian measures and embracing Soviet influence.

== Background ==
By 1965, Cuba was officially a one-party state after a long period of political solidification by Fidel Castro after the Cuban Revolution. In September 1966, Fidel Castro gave a speech to representatives of the Committees for the Defense of the Revolution. In the speech, he gave his ruling that workers would no longer receive material bonuses for extra labor and instead be encouraged by "moral enthusiasm" alone, which distanced Cuba from the Soviet model of using material incentives. This independent approach to economic policy fell into a global trend during the Cold War in which Third World countries adopted independent economic strategies in relation to the industrialized dominant power blocs.

Cuba had begun what was referred to as the "radical experiment", where the country was to be reorganized to promote revolutionary consciousness and an independent economy. Rural to urban migration was regulated, excess urban workers were sent to the countryside, and agricultural labor became common for students, soldiers, and convicts. The Military Units to Aid Production were established and used "anti-social" prisoners as penal laborers in agriculture.

In February 1968, a group in the Communist Party of Cuba and other official organizations known as the "microfaction" was completely purged from the government. The group numbered almost forty officials who endorsed Soviet-style material incentives over moral enthusiasm to encourage workers. They were accused of conspiring against the state, and made to serve prison sentences.

The Revolutionary Offensive drew on ideas articulated by Che Guevara during the Great Debate, a period of well-publicized economic debates in Cuba.

== Events ==
=== Nationalization and militarization ===
In March 13, 1968 on the eleventh anniversary of the Havana Presidential Palace attack, Fidel Castro announced plans to nationalize all remaining private businesses in Cuba, thus ushering in the Revolutionary Offensive. The nationalizations would be the first step in the larger economic mobilization of the country, with a primary goal of attaining an annual sugar harvest of 10 million tons by 1970. Alcohol sales would be outright banned. Nightclubs and bars were closed and their closures would be justified via official accusations that they were epicenters of prostitution, homosexuality, and crime. The Cuban government also issued blanket bans on self-employment, farmer's markets, and private gardens on state farms. In total the nationalized enterprises included 17,000 food retailers, 25,000 industrial product merchants, 11,300 bars and restaurants, 9,600 small workshops, and 14,000 barbers, laundries, and other small retail shops.

All production in Cuba would henceforth be organized using civil defense structures, where workers would be organized into squadrons, platoons, and other military brackets and be commanded by the military command post in their region. Workers were often moved to temporarily live in work stations outside their cities. The government implemented the Youth Centennial Column, composed of volunteers from the Young Communist League, to work in the countryside. By August 1968, around 350,000 workers, soldiers, students, and peasants were deployed to work in agriculture.

In April 1968, plans were implemented for CDRs to monitor parents and reward them for following official parenting protocols. During this time policies regarding Cuban youths began changing. Work programs and vocational schools for "maladjusted" students were created. Officials also warned that those embracing a "hippie lifestyle" could be rounded up and sent to jails or labor camps for lazy behavior.

=== Sugar harvest ===
In 1969 and 1970, Castro encouraged the Cuban people to do voluntary work in the countryside, particularly harvesting coffee and sugar cane. From the state's perspective, voluntarism would develop the socialist economy while encouraging the ethos of the socialist New Man. In 1970, Castro set the goal of using largely volunteer labor to harvest 10 million tons of sugar (Spanish: zafra de los diez millones), a substantial increase over previous harvests. The ten million ton harvest goal was not reached. Other sectors of the Cuban economy were neglected when large amounts of urban labor mobilized to the countryside.

During the 1970s, the ideas behind the Revolutionary Offensive lost support and the Cuban economic model re-oriented on the basis of the Soviet Union's Kosygin Reform.

=== Effects ===
Many Cubans were reportedly overcome with a fierce passion to accomplish the planned economic goals, and government officials saw this as evidence that moral enthusiasm alone could incentivize workers into better production.

However, with the elimination of many niche artisans, the state failed to fill the void of their lost services and their economic sectors quickly became under-served. With this unexpected economic downturn, the Cuban government's response was to initiate new policies militarizing labor forces. Some of the small merchants whose enterprises were nationalized chose to leave Cuba in the airlift active at the time. With the total erasure of small enterprises, the black market was severely reduced; however, barter transactions still continued in the rural countryside where the state's presence was weaker.

== Aftermath ==
The demise of the 1970 zafra (sugarcane harvest) was seen as an economic embarrassment, and encouraged Castro to begin decentralizing economic command, and building formal institutions. Since the Revolutionary Offensive and 1970 zafra were constructed with a Guevarist economic philosophy, after the demise of the zafra, soviet economic philosophy appeared more pragmatic to Castro.

Seeking Soviet help, from 1970 to 1972 Soviet economists re-organized Cuba's economy, founding the Cuban-Soviet Commission of Economic, Scientific and Technical Collaboration, while Soviet premier Alexei Kosygin visited in October 1971.

Beginning with the first Communist Party congress in 1975, the economy was to be managed by the System of Direction for Economic Planning (SDPE). This was done with the goal of boosting "revolutionary consciousness" among the workers, and maximizing efficiency. The SDPE recognized the law of value, financial transactions amongst state enterprises, defined taxes, and interest rates. All economic function was done to maximize profits, and successful managers were allowed to retain portions of profits.

== See also ==
- Five-year plans for the national economy of the Soviet Union
