= Carlos Rafael Rodríguez =

Cuban politician (1913–1997)

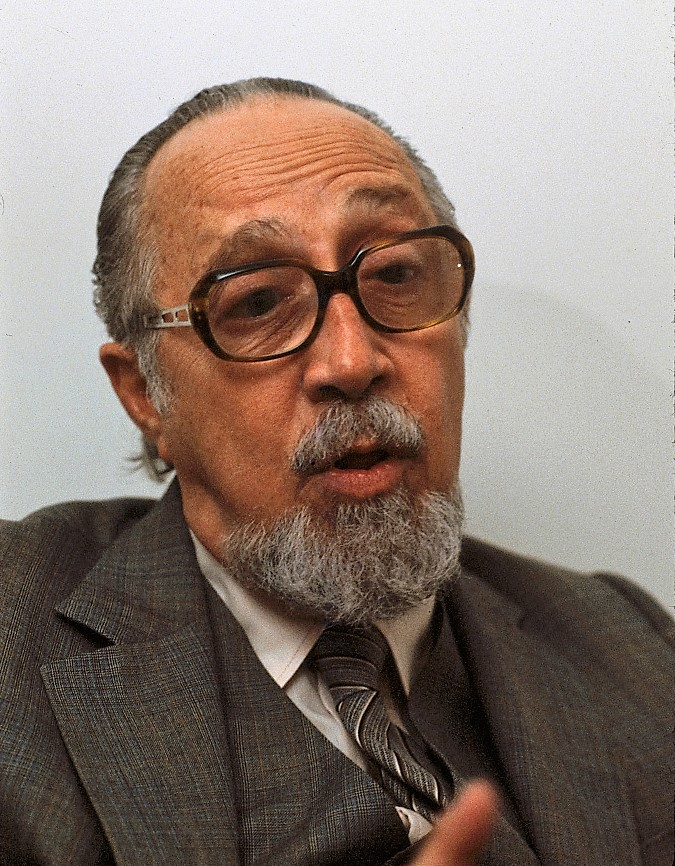
Rodríguez between 1970 and 1990

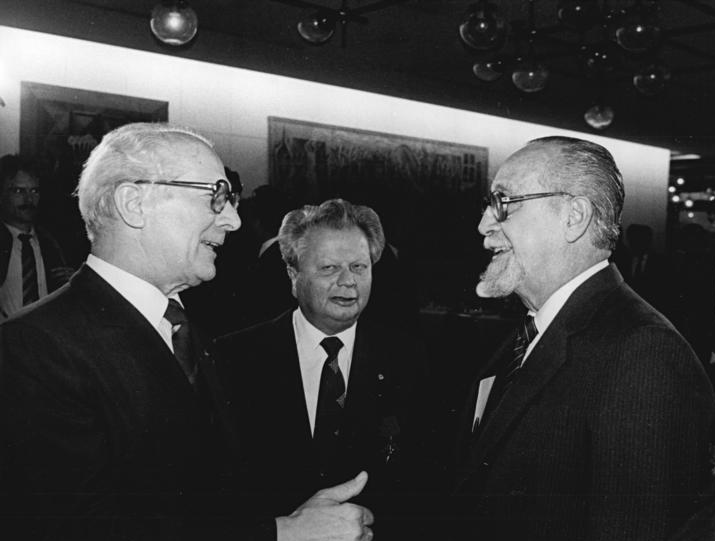
Carlos Rafael Rodríguez (right) with Erich Honecker (left) and Hermann Axen (center) in 1987

Carlos Rafael Rodríguez Rodríguez (May 23, 1913 – December 8, 1997) was a Cuban Communist politician and economist, who served in the cabinets of presidents Fulgencio Batista and Fidel Castro.

Born in Cienfuegos, he became mayor of the city when he was only 20. Four years later, he joined the Communist Party and was appointed editor of the party newspaper, Hoy. He graduated from university in 1939. Although he was a participant in the 1935 general strike against provisional President Carlos Mendieta, in 1942, Rodríguez joined the cabinet of President Fulgencio Batista. A "dedicated Marxist", Rodríguez's participation in the Batista cabinet marked the high point of the regime's collaboration with the Communist Party.

Rodríguez first met Fidel Castro through a mutual friend after Castro visited the Communist Party's bookstore a few days before his disastrous attack on the Moncada Barracks on July 26, 1953. Although Rodríguez denounced the attack after it occurred, he eventually allied himself with Castro in the Cuban Revolution. In July 1958, he joined the 26th of July Movement in the Sierra Maestra mountain range in support of its guerrilla war against Batista; it was the first such gesture of support by the Communist Party for the rebels.

Castro befriended him, and after his victory, he rewarded Rodríguez with top posts in the Cuban government. From 1962 to 1965, Rodríguez headed the National Institute of Agrarian Reform, and was referred to by some in the foreign press as Cuba's economic czar. In 1969, Castro sent him as an "observer" to the International Meeting of Communist and Workers Parties in Moscow, where he gave an important speech declaring that Cuba would "stand unflinchingly by the USSR". The speech was one of a series of steps taken by the Castro regime to move closer to the Soviet Union after having publicly disagreed with the Soviets in the early- and mid-1960s. Rodríguez remained a key figure in Soviet-Cuban relations, providing public statements during times of friendship and discord. Before being sidelined in 1997 with deteriorating health, he served on the Politburo and as Vice President. He suffered from Parkinson's disease and died in Havana, with Castro presiding over his burial ceremony.
