= Aníbal Escalante =

Cuban communist and political organizer (1909-1977)

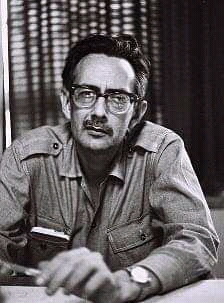
- Born: 1909
- Died: 1977 (aged 67–68); La Habana, Cuba
- Occupations: newspaper editor, politician
- Political party: Communist Party of Cuba

Aníbal Escalante Dellundé (1909 – 11 August 1977) was a Cuban communist and political organizer. An early leader within the Popular Socialist Party (PSP), he briefly held national office in Cuba following the Cuban revolution but was purged due, in part, to his "old-line" Marxist orthodoxy. He was later imprisoned over allegations he was plotting with the Soviet Union to orchestrate the overthrow of the Fidel Castro-led Cuban government.

== Early life ==
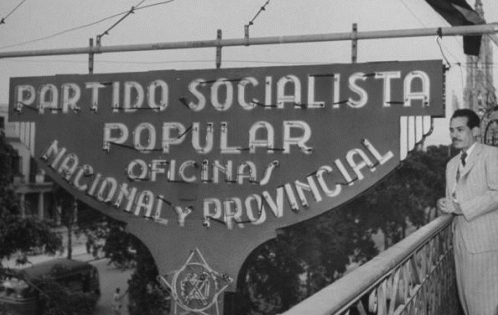
Escalante had helped found the Popular Socialist Party whose Havana headquarters are shown here in 1945.

Aníbal Escalante was born in 1909, the son of a Cuban independence fighter who fought under the command of Calixto Garcia.

Working with Blas Roca and others, Escalante was an early influence in the formation of the Popular Socialist Party (originally called the Communist Party of Cuba, though not to be confused with the party organized by the merger of the PSP and 26 July Movement in the 1960s). Beginning in 1938, with the legalization of the PSP by the Cuban government of Fulgencio Batista, Escalante was editor of Hoy, the party's official newspaper.

== Rise to power and downfall ==
=== Post-revolution ===
In the period immediately following the 1959 success of the Cuban revolution, Aníbal Escalante occupied a leading role in the Popular Socialist Party. However, its Marxist orthodoxy and history of cooperation with the deposed government of Fulgencio Batista gave it a skeptical public reputation. Largely sidelined in national politics, Escalante and the PSP took a back seat to Fidel Castro and his 26 July Movement.

Following the Bay of Pigs invasion in April 1961, Cuba appealed to the Soviet Union for military assistance. In exchange for aid, the PSP was merged with the 26 July Movement and the Revolutionary Directorate of 13 March into the Integrated Revolutionary Organizations (ORI), predecessor to the Communist Party of Cuba, and Escalante, who enjoyed support from Moscow, elevated to its secretary. According to Juanita Castro, some referred to this period as the "Anibalato". Juanita Castro noted that, during this period, "his picture ran in the papers more frequently than Fidel's and more Escalante people were finding their way into positions of power."

=== Dismissal from office ===
==== Reasons ====
Escalante was dismissed from his post on 22 March 1962 by the ORI leadership at the instigation of Fidel Castro. Escalante, widely considered an "old line communist," was accused of building a party disconnected from the people. In a speech on March 26 of that year, Castro described Escalante as "having promoted the sectarian spirit to its highest possible level, of having promoted an organization which he controlled ... he simply allowed himself to be blinded by personal ambition." In a 1966 interview with an Egyptian magazine, meanwhile, Che Guevara said that Escalante had used his office to fill party positions with friends and colleagues who enjoyed "various privileges - beautiful secretaries, Cadillac cars, air-conditioning."

A cable from the Polish embassy in Havana to that nation's foreign ministry, meanwhile, gave the following account of Escalante's purge which it reported had been provided to it by Blas Roca Calderio:

motives [for the removal of Anibal Escalante were as follows]: as an organizational secretary of the ORI, A. E. used brutal and arbitrary methods of management, as well as intrigues aimed at concentrating control in his hands over the party and national apparatus. He used these methods towards other comrades regardless of their previous organizational membership [that is, whether they belonged to the former Popular Socialist Party or the "26th of July Movement"]. He managed to [take] control of a series of ministries, among others, the Ministry of Internal Affairs; he undertook the steps in order to control the military cadres.

==== Significance ====
The ouster of Escalante resulted in a relaxation of the "Stalinist atmosphere" that had been developing in Cuba over the preceding months.

Timothy Naftali has contended that Escalante's dismissal was a motivating factor behind the Soviet decision to place nuclear missiles in Cuba in 1962. According to Naftali, Soviet foreign policy planners were concerned Castro's break with Escalante foreshadowed a Cuban drift toward China and sought to solidify the Soviet-Cuban relationship through the missile basing program.

=== Microfaction plot ===
After his dismissal, Escalante spent two years in Czechoslovakia. He returned and continued as an activist with the Communist Party of Cuba, however, in 1967 was accused of being part of a faction of former Popular Socialist Party members who were developing direct ties with Eastern European governments outside of normal channels. The allegations involved officials from the Soviet embassy in Havana whom, Raúl Castro claimed, were conspiring with Escalante to orchestrate the overthrow of the Cuban government. Escalante and his confederates were charged with counter-revolutionary activities and, in February 1968, he was convicted and sentenced to 15 years in prison, though was later released. The purge of the "pro-Soviet" Escalante "microfaction" within the party was accompanied by the strong denouncement of the USSR by Fidel Castro before the Latin American Organization of Solidarity.

A 1983 report by the Inter-American Commission on Human Rights asserts that Escalante's imprisonment marked the end of political pluralism within the Communist Party of Cuba, claiming that "since the defeat and imprisonment in 1968 of the so-called 'microfaction' within the Cuban Communist Party, led by Aníbal Escalante, there has been no effective opposition to political power in Cuba."

== Personal life ==
Escalante died, at the age of 67, of a serious illness in Havana, Cuba on 11 August 1977. He had been an official of a ranch in the village of Nueva Paz, in the current Mayabeque Province, Cuba.

Escalante's nephew, Pedro Riera Escalante, worked as a consul in the Cuban embassy in Mexico City from 1986 to 1991. In 2000, Riera covertly left Cuba and returned to Mexico, where he requested asylum. His request was rejected by the Mexican government and he was deported back to Cuba. According to Riera, his previous consular assignment in Mexico was an official cover and he was, in fact, a Cuban intelligence officer.
