= Sandalio Junco =

Cuban labor figure

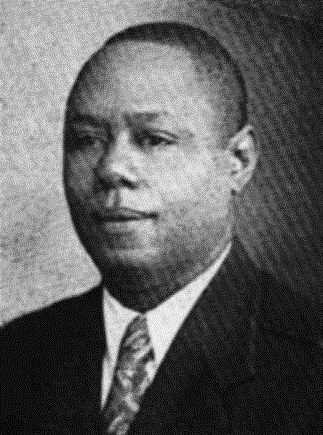
Portrait of Sandalio Junco

Sandalio Junco Camellón (1894-1942) was a Cuban Afro-Latino labor figure and communist radical. Having started out as a trade unionist, Junco rose through anarcho-syndicalist organizations to fight for the interests of workers throughout Cuba. After going into exile following arrest, Junco travelled from Mexico to South America to the Soviet Union, developing and advocating his views in the interest of workers and people of color. Upon his return to Cuba, his involvement and eventual work against the Stalinist- aligned Cuban Communist Party established him as the "father of Cuban Trotskyism." Junco was assassinated on May 8, 1942, by members of the Communist party.

== Early career ==
Born in 1894, Sandalio Junco started out as a member of the Cuban baker's union. In 1920 he joined the Federación Obrera de la Habana (FOH), an anarcho-syndicalist union active in struggles in labor. Through the organization, the Second National Workers’ Congress was held, where participants aired demands for improvements such as equal wages for similar jobs and an 8- hour work day, as well as complaints of US interventionism in the island.

However, by 1925 Junco realized the FOH was too regional and was constrained by class limitations, and he went on to form the Confederation of Cuban Workers (Confederación Nacional Obrera de Cuba, CNOC). With Junco as its International Secretary, the CNOC worked for the interests of Cuban laborers, often demonstrating against the repressive rule of the president at the time, Gerardo Machado.

At the time, Junco was also a prominent member of the Comintern-aligned Cuban Communist Party (Partido Comunista de Cuba, PCC). However, he was arrested and jailed that same year for a bomb plot in the same cause as Julio Antonio Mella. By 1928, a few years later, Junco fled from Cuba to Mexico, escaping the repression of president and later dictator Gerardo Machado.

== Time in Exile ==
During his time in Mexico, Junco remained close with Mella. He helped found the Association of New Revolutionary Emigres of Cuba (Asociación de Nuevos Emigrados Revolucionarios Cubanos, ANERC), and worked with the Mexican Communist Party (Partido Comunista de México, PCM). Additionally, he became the Caribbean Secretary for the Latin American Confederation of Labor and the Provisional Secretary for the All-American Anti-Imperialist League (AAAIL). In this time, he helped forge a connection between the United States, Cuba, and Mexico through communist ideas and the support of the aforementioned organizations.

In the next year, Junco attended and spoke at a series of conferences addressing the plights of workers and Afro-Latinos. He spoke at the National Assembly for the Unification of Workers and Peasants in Mexico, before leaving for other parts of Latin America. Through the CNOC he attended the Congreso de la Conferencia Sindical Latinoamericana, where he delivered his speech "The Negro Problem and the Proletarian Movement" among other comments. In his speech he responds to previous speeches made at the conference, especially that of Jose Carlos Mariategui. Junco intervenes by pointing out the commonalities in discrimination faced by black, indigenous, and immigrant communities, among others, within Latin American communities. He argued for a version of black internationalist politics that incorporated both race-based and class-based visions, finding a middle point between them. He also was said to have attended the Conferencia de los Partidos Comunistas en América Latina, raising similar concerns.

In 1930, Sandalio Junco was arrested because of his trade union actions in Mexico along with a few others. He managed to organize a defense with the help of a regional campaign as well as support from the ANLC, and AAAIL and the newspaper the Negro Champion, all defending him as "the primary voice for anti-racist, pro-Communist advocacy." Due to this wave of support for Junco, the Mexican government released him and he once again fled, this time to Europe and the USSR.

In his time in the USSR, Junco began to develop his Trotskyist views, questioning the role and actions of the Comintern under Stalin. Particularly, he disagreed on the role and path of revolution in Cuba, maintaining that Cuba should undergo a socialist revolution, but Cuba was not ready for such a revolution against Machado.

== Return to Cuba ==
By 1932, Junco returned to Cuba. He promptly organized the Communist Opposition (Opposicion Comunista, OC) a trotskyist fringe group within the PCC. The OC disagreed with Comintern's line of thought in regards to the Cuban situation, citing a lack of connection between a "traditional landlord oligarchy and imperialism" as well as the Comintern's neglect in acknowledging the importance of the Cuban middle class's potential role in the revolution, as the class was not rooted in bureaucracy like those present in Europe. He, along with the group, were expelled from the Cuban Communist Party that same year. It became the Bolshevik-Leninist Party (Partido Bolchevique-Leninista, PBL) and generally aligned itself with Leon Trotsky's International Left Opposition.

In the decade before his death, Junco continued to work both as a leader in labor, and as a trotskyist figure in the struggle against the Comintern aligned Cuban Communist Party. In 1933, President Ramon Grau San Martin took power, and the PBL rose to support his short-lived radical nationalist government against attacks from the CNOC and the PCC. Junco organized a series of strikes the next year, coordinating efforts from construction workers and downtown Havana department store workers.

In 1935, Junco joined the Joven Cuba party, becoming its labor secretary. Organized by Antonio Guiteras, Joven Cuba was a left- wing party with influences among students and labor. By 1937 he also became part of the Auténtico Party of ex-president Ramon Grau San Martin, where he established the Comision Obrera. This branch served as the main opposition to the Communist Party, attempting to establish its presence in each of the labor unions in Cuba. The following year Junco attended the Confederation of Latin American Workers on its behalf.

== Death and aftermath ==
Sandalio Junco was assassinated by a Stalinist gun squad on May 8, 1942. The day was to be the 7th anniversary of the death of Antonio Guiteras, founder of Joven Cuba and "the most left-wing of the members of the Grau San Martin government", and a meeting was organized to commemorate him. Junco was to be the main speaker at the event, but earlier in the day a group of Stalinists burst in and shot Junco, killing him and two more, and injuring others.

Junco's death aroused a wave of protests throughout Cuba, adding to the unrest already present in the island. In the time following, the PBL lost much of its power, becoming virtually insignificant in its oppositionary role.
