= Negro Act of 1740 =

United States slavery law

The Negro Act of 1740 was passed in the Province of South Carolina, on May 10, 1740, during colonial Governor William Bull's time in office, in response to the Stono Rebellion in 1739.

The comprehensive act made it illegal for enslaved Africans to move abroad, assemble in groups, raise food, earn money, and learn to write (though reading was not proscribed). Additionally, owners were permitted to kill rebellious slaves if necessary. The Act remained in effect until 1865.

John Belton O'Neall summarized the 1740 South Carolina law, in his 1848 written work, The Negro Law of South Carolina, when he stated: "A slave may, by the consent of his master, acquire and hold personal property. All, thus required, is regarded in law as that of the master." Across the South, state supreme courts supported the position of this law. O'Neall was the only one to express protest against the Act, arguing for the propriety of receiving testimony from enslaved Africans (many of whom had become Christians) under oath: "Negroes (slave or free) will feel the sanctions of an oath, with as much force as any of the ignorant classes of white people, in a Christian country."
