= The Negro Law of South Carolina =

The Negro Law of South Carolina (1848) was one of John Belton O'Neall's longer works.

== Summary and immediate reception ==
In 1848, the author read the Negro Law of South Carolina to the State Agricultural Society of South Carolina, at their September semi-annual meeting in the Spartanburg Court House. The Society directed O’Neall to submit it to the governor, with a request that he would lay it before the legislature, at its approaching session in November of 1848. O'Neall also ordered it to be published for the information of the members. O'Neall summarized the 1740 South Carolina law when he stated: "A slave may, by the consent of his master, acquire and hold personal property. All, thus required, is regarded in law as that of the master." Across the South, state supreme courts supported the position of this law. O'Neall was the only one to express protest against the evidentiary Act of 1740, arguing for the propriety of receiving testimony from enslaved Africans-Americans (many of whom, by 1848, were Christians) under oath: "Negroes (slave or free) will feel the sanctions of an oath, with as much force as any of the ignorant classes of white people, in a Christian country." On December 18, 1848, Mr. W. G. DeSaussure, from the committee on the Judiciary agreed on the Message of the Governor recommending the purchase of 1200 copies of the Negro Law of South Carolina and sent report of this agreement to the House of Representatives for consideration. On December 8, 1858, Mr. Cannon offered a resolution for the Military Committee to inquire into the expediency of having the Negro Law of South Carolina re-published and bound in a separate volume for the purpose of distributing among the Militia Officers of the State and the Commissioners of Roads and Bridges of the State.

== Legacy ==
The Negro Law of South Carolina was characterized by Howell Meadoes Henry as being: "An excellent summary of South Carolina slave law with court interpretations in narrative style, and with notes and comment and even recommendations as to desirable changes." It provides examples of opposition to and violation of literacy law by white evangelicals.

== Excerpt ==
The following is an excerpt from the first page, of the first chapter, on "The Status of the Negro, his Rights and Disabilities", in the Negro Law of South Carolina:

SECTION 1. The Act of 1740, sec. I, declares all negroes and Indians, (free Indians in amity with this Government, negroes, mulattoes and mestizoes, who now are free, excepted) to be slaves:— the offspring to follow the condition of the mother; and that such slaves are chattels personal.
SEC. 2. Under this provision it has been uniformly held, that color is prima facie evidence, that the party bearing the color of a negro, mulatto or mestizo, is a slave; but the same prima facie result does not follow from the Indian color.
SEC. 3. Indians, and the descendants of Indians are regarded as free Indians, in amity with this government, until the contrary be shown. In the second proviso of sec. 1, of the Act of 1740, it is declared that "every negro, Indian, mulatto and mestizo is a slave unless the contrary can be made to appear"—yet, in the same it is immediately thereafter provided—"the Indians in amity with this government, excepted, in which case the burden of proof shall lie on the defendant," that is, on the person claiming the Indian plaintiff to be a slave. This latter clause of the proviso is now regarded as furnishing the rule. The race of slave Indians or of Indians not in amity to this government, (The State,) is extinct, and hence the previous part of the proviso has no application.
SEC. 4. The term negro is confined to slave Africans, (the ancient Berbers) and their descendants. It does not embrace the free inhabitants of Africa, such as the Egyptians, Moors, or the negro Asiatics, such as the Lascars.
SEC. 5. Mulatto is the issue of the white and the negro.
SEC. 6. When the mulatto ceases, and a party bearing some slight taint of the African blood, ranks as white, is a question for the solution of a Jury.
