= Riesgo =

Riesgo is a surname. Notable people with the surname include:

- Asier Riesgo (born 1983), Spanish footballer
- Giuseppe Riesgo (born 1995), Brazilian politician
- José Riesgo (1919–2002), Spanish actor
- Nikco Riesgo (born 1967), American baseball player

== See also ==
- Alfonso Bernal del Riesgo (1902–1975), Cuban psychologist
