= Negro =

Historical term for Black people

In the English language, the term negro is a term historically used to refer to people of Black African heritage. The term negro means the color black in Spanish and Portuguese (from Latin niger). The term can be viewed as offensive, inoffensive, or completely neutral, largely depending on the context, region or country where it is used, as well as the time period and context in which it is applied. It has various equivalents in other European languages.

== In English ==
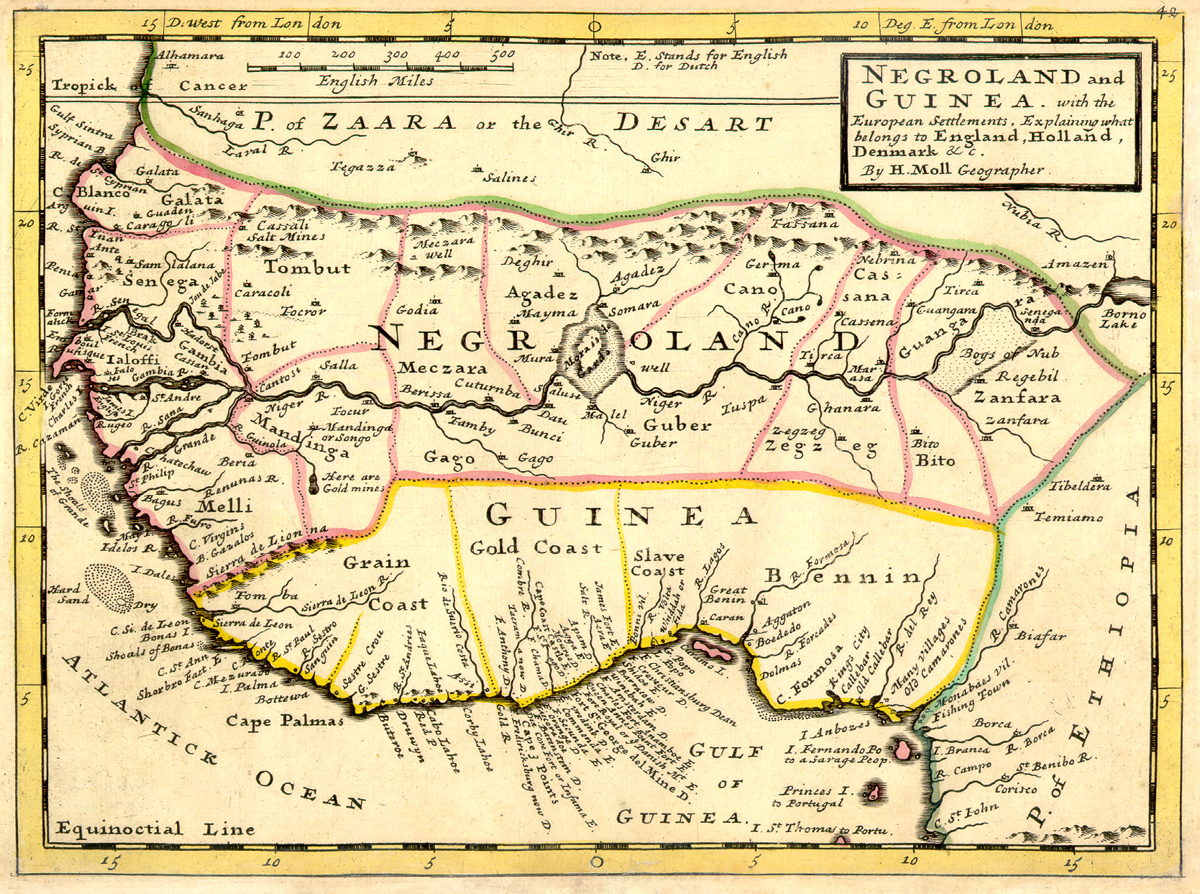
A European map of West Africa, 1736. Included is the archaic mapping designation of Negroland.

Around 1442, the Portuguese first arrived in Southern Africa while trying to find a sea route to India. The term negro, literally meaning 'black', was used by the Spanish and Portuguese as a simple description to refer to the Bantu peoples that they encountered. Negro denotes 'black' in Spanish and Portuguese, derived from the Latin word niger, meaning 'black', which itself is probably from a Proto-Indo-European root *nekw-, "to be dark", akin to *nokw-, 'night'. Negro was also used for the peoples of West Africa in old maps labelled Negroland, an area stretching along the Niger River.

From the 18th century to the late 1960s, negro (later capitalized) was considered to be the proper English-language term for people of black African origin. According to Oxford Dictionaries, use of the word "now seems out of date or even offensive in both British and US English".

A specifically female form of the word, negress (sometimes capitalized), was occasionally used. However, like Jewess, it has completely fallen out of use.

Negroid was used within physical anthropology to denote one of the three purported races of humankind, alongside Caucasoid and Mongoloid. The suffix "-oid" means "similar to". Negroid as a noun was used to designate a wider or more generalized category than Negro; as an adjective, it qualified a noun as in, for example, "negroid features".

=== United States ===
"If on no other issue than this one [the capitalization of the word Negro], Du Bois and Washington were in total agreement; each of them consistently urged the adoption of upper-case treatment by mainstream publications. Du Bois's Suppression and Philadelphia Negro monographs had been among the first to have the noun placed in capitals, and Washington's success in getting Doubleday, Page and Company to capitalize the word in Up From Slavery represented a significant breakthrough."

— W. E. B. Du Bois: Biography of a Race, 1868–1919 by David Levering Lewis

In 17th-century colonial America, the term Negro had been also, according to one historian, used to describe Native Americans. John Belton O'Neall's The Negro Law of South Carolina (1848) stipulated that "the term negro is confined to slave Africans, (the ancient Berbers) and their descendants. It does not embrace the free inhabitants of Africa, such as the Egyptians, Moors, or the negro Asiatics, such as the Lascars." The American Negro Academy was founded in 1897, to support liberal arts education. Marcus Garvey used the word in the names of black nationalist and pan-Africanist organizations such as the Universal Negro Improvement Association (founded 1914), the Negro World (1918), the Negro Factories Corporation (1919), and the Declaration of the Rights of the Negro Peoples of the World (1920). W. E. B. Du Bois and Dr. Carter G. Woodson used it in the titles of their non-fiction books, The Negro (1915) and The Mis-Education of the Negro (1933) respectively. Du Bois also used in the titles of his books The Study of the Negro Problems (1898) and The Philadelphia Negro (1899). Negro was accepted as normal, both as endonym and exonym, until the late 1960s, after the later Civil Rights Movement. One example is Martin Luther King Jr. self-identification as Negro in his famous "I Have a Dream" speech of 1963.

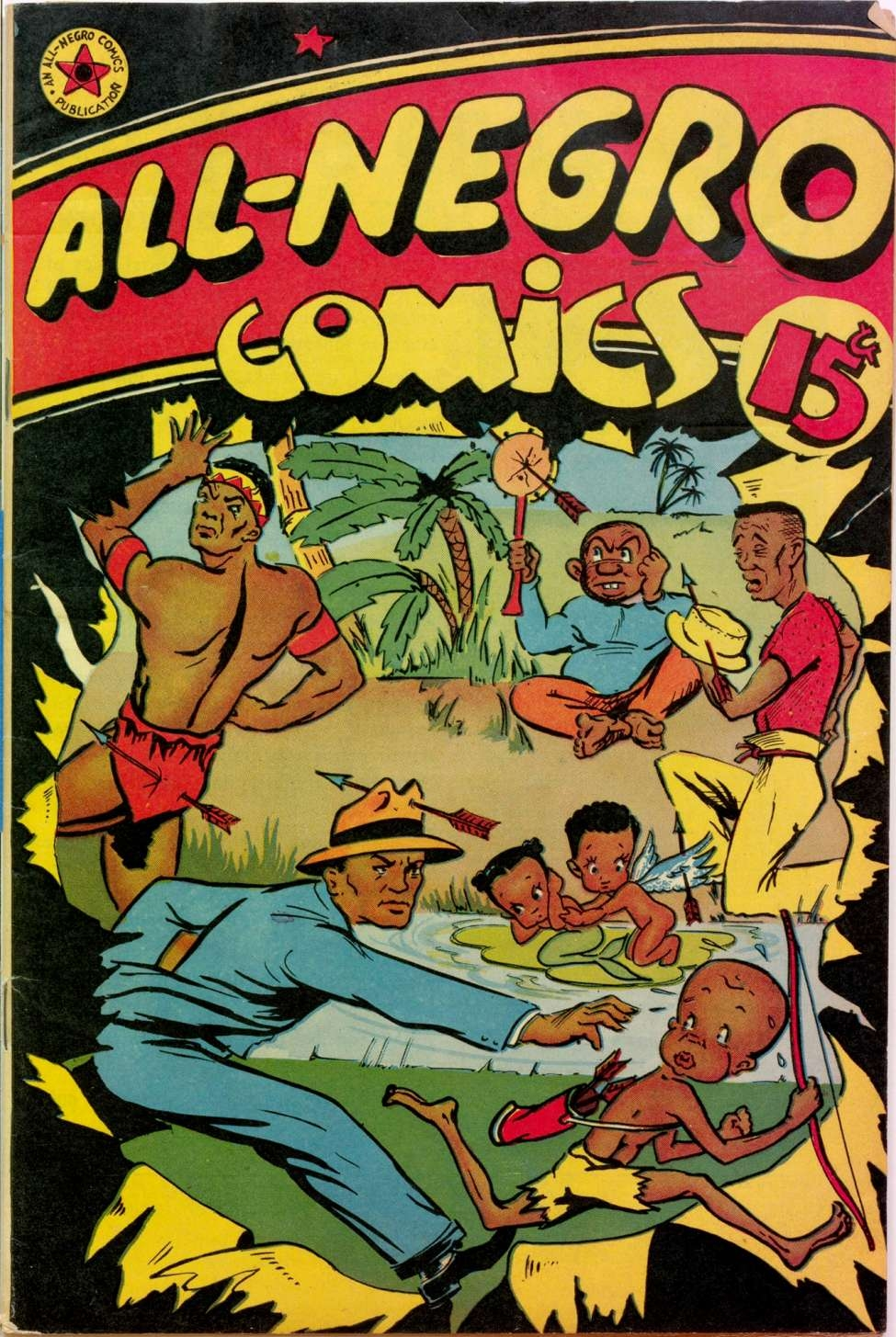
Prevalence of negro as a demonym has varied in American English. All-Negro Comics was a 1947 comic anthology written by African-American writers and featuring black characters.

However, during the late 1950s and early 1960s, the word Negro began to be criticized as having been imposed by white people, and having connotations of racial subservience and Uncle Tomism. The term Black, in contrast, denoted pride, power, and a rejection of the past. It took root first in more militant groups such as the Black Muslims and Black Panthers, and by 1967, SNCC leader Stokely Carmichael pushed for the abandonment of Negro. After the Newark riots in the summer of 1967, one third to one half of young Black males polled in Newark self-identified as Black. The term coexisted for a while with Negro, with the newer term initially referring only to progressive or radical Blacks, while Negro was used more for the Black establishment. Malcolm X preferred Black to Negro, but also started using the term Afro-American after leaving the Nation of Islam.

Since the late 1960s, various other terms have been more widespread in popular usage. These include Black, Black African, Afro-American (in use from the late 1960s to 1990) and African American. The word Negro fell out of favor by the early 1970s and major media including Associated Press and The New York Times stopped using it that decade. However, many older African Americans initially found the term black more offensive than Negro.

The term Negro is still used in some historical contexts, such as the songs known as Negro spirituals, the Negro leagues of baseball in the early and mid-20th century, and organizations such as the United Negro College Fund. The academic journal published by Howard University since 1932 still bears the title Journal of Negro Education, but others have changed: e.g. the Association for the Study of Negro Life and History (founded 1915) became the Association for the Study of Afro-American Life and History in 1973, and is now the Association for the Study of African American Life and History; its publication The Journal of Negro History became The Journal of African American History in 2001. Margo Jefferson titled her 2015 book Negroland: A Memoir to evoke growing up in the 1950s and 1960s in the African-American upper class.

African-American linguist John McWhorter has bemoaned attacks on the use of Negro in "utterances or written reproductions of the word when referring to older texts and titles". He cites reports that performances or publishing of certain works (William L. Dawson's Negro Folk Symphony, and an anthology of Norman Mailer's works) have been avoided, "out of wariness of the word 'Negro'” used in titles; and of "two cases" between 2020-2021 "of white college professors having complaints filed against them by students for using the word 'Negro' in class when quoting older texts."

The United States Census Bureau included Negro on the 2010 Census, alongside Black and African-American, because some older Black Americans still self-identify with the term. The U.S. census used the grouping "Black, African-American, or Negro". Negro was used in an effort to include older African Americans who more closely associate with the term. In 2013, the census removed the term from its forms and questionnaires. The term has also been censored by some newspaper archives.

=== Liberia ===
The constitution of Liberia limits Liberian nationality to Negro people (see also Liberian nationality law). People of other racial origins, even if they have lived for many years in Liberia, are thus precluded from becoming citizens of the Republic.

== In other languages ==
=== Spanish language ===
In Spanish, negro (feminine negra) is most commonly used for the color black, but it can also be used to describe people with dark-colored skin. In Spain, Mexico, and almost all of Latin America, negro (lower-cased, as ethnonyms are generally not capitalized in Romance languages) means just 'black colour' and does not refer by itself to any ethnic or race unless further context is provided. As in English, this Spanish word is often used figuratively and negatively, to mean 'irregular' or 'undesirable', as in mercado negro ('black market'). However, in most Spanish-speaking countries, negro and negra are commonly as a form of endearment, when used to refer to partners or close friends.

=== Spanish East Indies ===
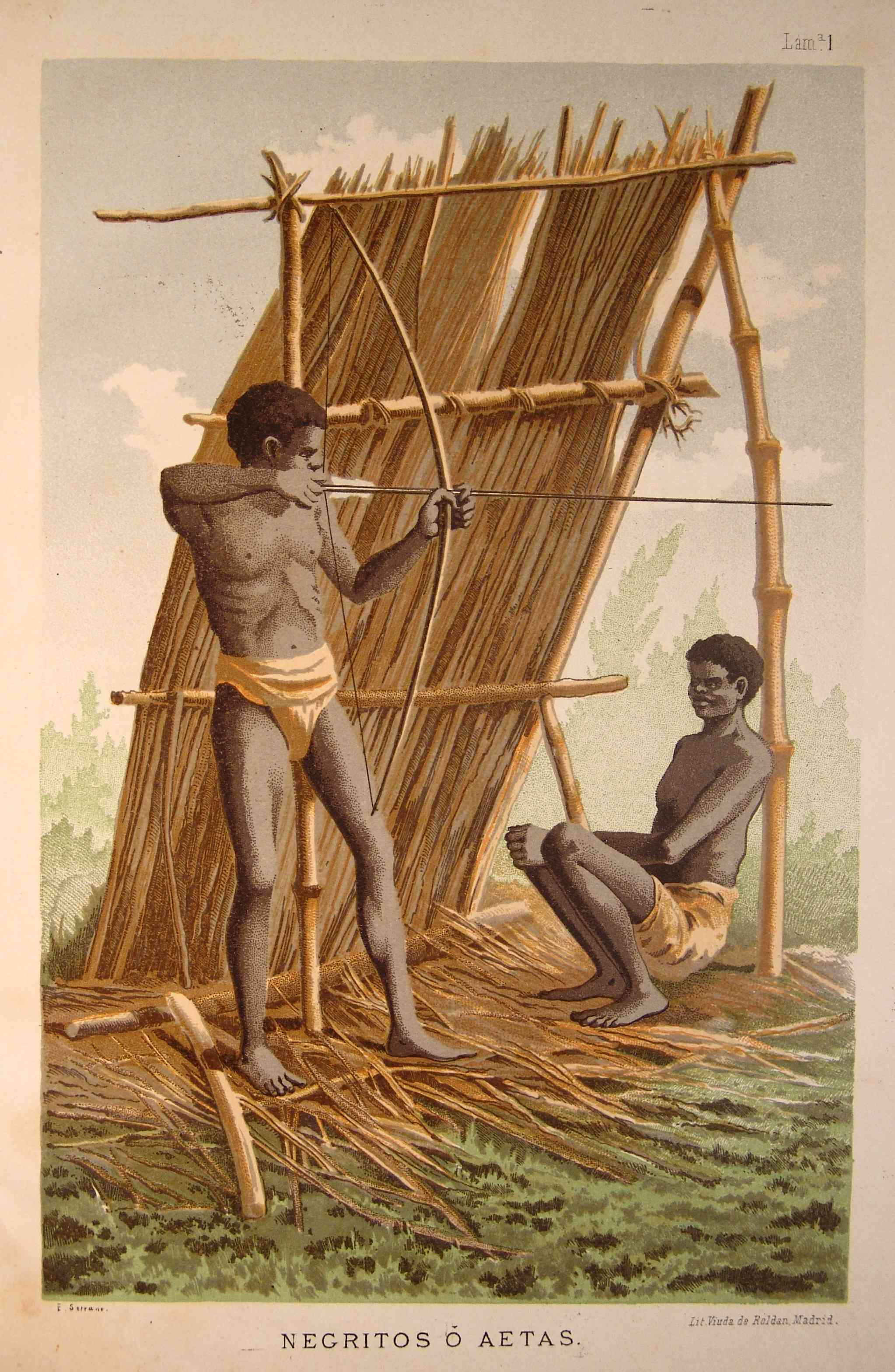
"Negritos o Aetas" illustration in Bosquejo Geográfico e Histórico-natural del Archipielago Filipino (Ramon Jordana i Morera, 1885)

In the Philippines, which historically had almost no contact with the Atlantic slave trade, the Spanish-derived term negro (feminine negra) is still commonly used to refer to black people, as well as to people with dark-colored skin (both native and foreign). As in Spanish usage, it has no negative connotations when referring to black people. However, it can be mildly pejorative when referring to the skin color of other native Filipinos due to traditional beauty standards. The use of the term for the color black is restricted to Spanish phrases or nouns.

Negrito (feminine negrita) is also a term used in the Philippines to refer to the various darker-skinned native ethnic groups that partially descended from early Australo-Melanesian migrations. These groups include the Aeta, Ati, Mamanwa, and the Batak, among others. Despite physical appearances, they all speak Austronesian languages and are genetically related to other Austronesian Filipinos. The island of Negros is named after them. The term Negrito has entered scientific usage in the English language based on the original Spanish/Filipino usage to refer to similar populations in South and Southeast Asia. However, the appropriateness of using the word to bundle people of similar physical appearances has been questioned as genetic evidence show they do not have close shared ancestry.

=== Other Romance languages ===
==== Italian ====
In Italian, negro was the archaic form of the adjective nero; as such, the previous form can still be found in literary texts or in surnames (cfr. the English-language surname Black), while the latter form is the only one currently used today. However, the word could also be used as a noun and at a certain point it was commonly used as term equivalent to English negro, but without its offensive connotation. However, under influence from English-speaking cultures, by the 1970s it had been replaced with nero and di colore. Nero was considered a better translation of the English word black, while di colore is a loan translation of the English word colored.

The noun is considered offensive today, but some attestations of the previous use can still be found.

In Italian law, Act No. 654 of 13 October 1975 (known as the "Reale Act"), as amended by Act No. 205 of 25 June 1993 (known as the "Mancino Act") and Act No. 85 of 24 February 2006, criminalizes incitement to and racial discrimination itself, incitement to and racial violence itself, the promotion of ideas based on racial superiority or ethnic or racist hatred and the setting up or running of, participation in or support to any organisation, association, movement or group whose purpose is the instigation of racial discrimination or violence. As the Council of Europe noted in its 2016 report, "the wording of the Reale Act does not include language as ground of discrimination, nor is [skin] color included as a ground of discrimination." However, the Supreme Court, in affirming a lower-court decision, declared that the use of the term negro by itself, if it has a clearly offensive intention, may be punishable by law, and is considered an aggravating factor in a criminal prosecution.

==== French ====
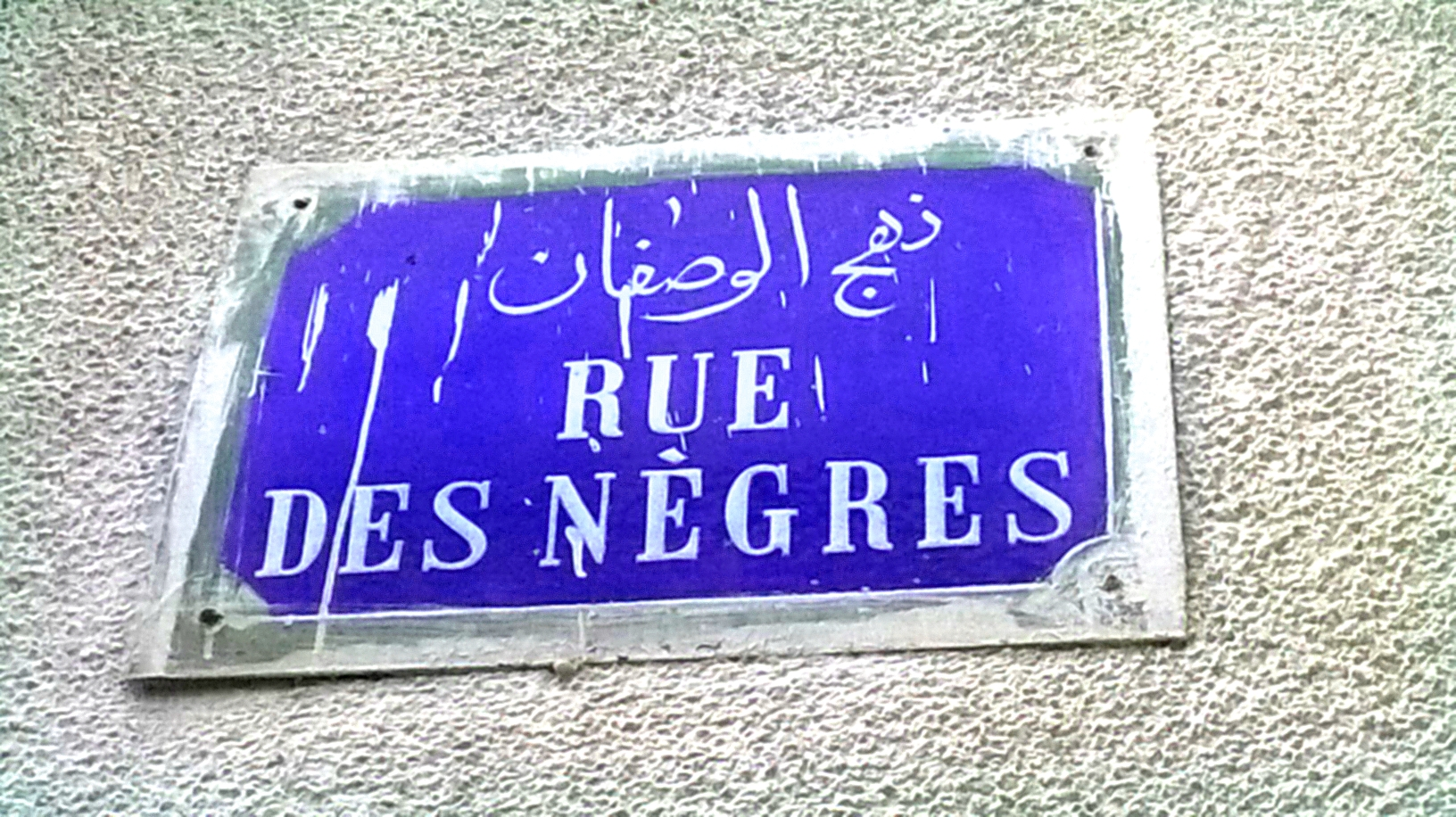
Street plate in Medina of Tunis showing, in Arabic and French, Negroes street

In the French language, the existential concept of negritude ('blackness') was developed by the Senegalese politician Léopold Sédar Senghor. The word can still be used as a synonym of sweetheart in some traditional Louisiana French creole songs. The word nègre as a racial term fell out of favor around the same time as its English equivalent negro. Its usage in French today (nègre littéraire) has shifted completely, to refer to a ghostwriter (écrivain fantôme), i.e. one who writes a book on behalf of its nominal author, usually a non-literary celebrity. However, French Ministry of Culture guidelines (as well as other official entities of Francophone regions) recommend the usage of alternative terms.

==== Haitian Creole ====
In Haitian Creole, the word nèg (derived from the French nègre referring to a dark-skinned man), can also be used for any man, regardless of skin color, roughly like the terms guy or dude in American English.

==== Romanian ====
In the Romanian language, negru can refer to either the color or a black person (as a neutral term).

=== Germanic languages ===
The Dutch word neger was considered to be a neutral term, but since the start of the 21st century it is increasingly considered to be hurtful, condescending and/or discriminatory. The consensus among language advice services of the Flemish Government and Dutch Language Union is to use zwarte persoon/man/vrouw ('black person/man/woman') to denote race instead.

In German, Neger was considered to be a neutral term for black people, but gradually fell out of fashion in the 1970s. Neger is now mostly thought to be derogatory or racist. In 2014, the Österreichischer Presserat (Austrian Press Council) claimed that the use of "Negerkinder" (negro children) in a magazine was discriminatory and offensive. In Bavaria and Upper Austria, a mixed drink consisting of wheat beer and cola is traditionally called and sold as Neger, though many restaurateurs have supported renaming it to "Cola-Weißbier" after growing criticism of the name.

In Denmark, usage of neger is up for debate. Linguists and others argue that the word has a historical racist legacy that makes it unsuitable for use today. Mainly older people use the word neger with the notion that it is a neutral word paralleling negro. Relatively few young people use it, other than for provocative purposes in recognition that the word's acceptability has declined.

In Swedish and Norwegian, neger used to be considered a neutral equivalent to negro. However, the term gradually fell out of favor between the late 1960s and 1990s.

In West Frisian, the word neger is largely considered to be a neutral term for black people with African roots. The word nikker (evil water spirit) is considered to be offensive and derogatory, but not necessarily racist due to the term's historic definition.

== Elsewhere ==
In the Finnish language the word neekeri (cognate with negro) was long considered a neutral equivalent for negro. In 2002, neekeri's usage notes in the Kielitoimiston sanakirja shifted from "perceived as derogatory by some" to "generally derogatory". The name of a popular Finnish brand of chocolate-coated marshmallow treats was changed by the manufacturers from Neekerinsuukko (lit. 'negro's kiss', like the German version) to Brunbergin suukko ('Brunberg's kiss') in 2001. A study conducted among native Finns found that 90% of research subjects considered the terms neekeri and ryssä among the most derogatory epithets for ethnic minorities.

In Turkish, the appellation zenci can be translated as negro, although the two words do not fully correspond. The Turkish appellation was derived from the Arabic zanj, literally meaning "black". Although it has been argued by some in Turkey that zenci does not carry a pejorative connotation, the sociologist Ayşegül Kayagil pointed out a semantic relation between the word and "slave" due to its usage in the name of the Zanj Rebellion, a major slave revolt in the 9th century. According to Kayagil, zenci is also often accompanied by derogatory adjectives such as "dirty" or "slave". Opinions on the word among African Turkish interviewees in Kayagil's research were complex, with respondents highlighting its common usage in Turkey in addition to its negative connection to the English word negro.

In Hungarian the word néger is still used (see this Hungarian wikipedia article) as a neutral term for black people besides fekete (meaning black in Hungarian).

In Russia, the term негр (negr) was commonly used in the Soviet period without any negative connotation, and its use continues in this neutral sense. In modern Russian media, negr is used somewhat less frequently. Чёрный (chyorny, 'black') as an adjective is also used in a neutral sense, and conveys the same meaning as negr, as in чёрные американцы (chyornye amerikantsy, 'black Americans'). Other alternatives to negr are темнокожий (temnokozhy, 'dark-skinned'), чернокожий (chernokozhy, 'black-skinned'). The latter two words are used as both nouns and adjectives. See also Afro-Russian.

== See also ==
- Free Negro
- Kaffir (racial term)
- Nigger
- Blackfella
- Nigga
- Magical Negro, a trope in fiction
- The Book of Negroes, a historical document
