= The Negro Problem (disambiguation) =

The Negro Problem is a 1903 collection of essays by Black American writers including W. E. B. DuBois and Paul Laurence Dunbar, edited by Booker T. Washington.

The Negro Problem may also refer to:

- The Negro problem - A historical term used during the post-Reconstruction era to describe tensions between blacks and whites in the South
- The Negro Problem Solved, an 1864 book by Hollis Read
- The Negro Problem, an 1884 article by Nathaniel Shaler published in the Atlantic Monthly
- The Negro Problem, an 1891 book by William Cabell Bruce
- The Negro Problem, a band led by Stew (musician), named after Washington's book
- "The Negro Problem", a song by Chance the Rapper from the 2025 album Star Line

== See also ==
- The Study of the Negro Problems, an 1898 essay by W. E. B DuBois
- An American Dilemma, subtitled The Negro Problem and Modern Democracy, a 1944 study of race relations
