= Alfonso Bernal del Riesgo =

Cuban psychologist (1902–1975)

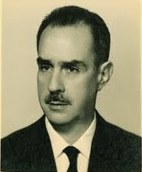
- Alfonos Bernal del Riesgo
- Born: January 23, 1902
- Died: January 4, 1975 (aged 72); Havana, Cuba
- Education: University of Havana
- Occupations: Professor, psychologist

Alfonso Bernal del Riesgo (January 23, 1902 – January 4, 1975, Havana, Cuba) was a Cuban psychologist, known for his contribution to the origin and development of psychology as science and profession. He was a psychologist, lawyer, professor, writer, and researcher. Bernal del Riesgo had a long and successful career at the University of Havana. Through his writings he developed the notion of Cubanosofía that defined the study of the Cuban psychological identity. The writings of Enrique José Varona and Alfredo Aguayo influenced his early work.

== Biography ==
Alfonso Bernal del Riesgo was born in 1902 in a complicated birth where his twin brother died. His mother, Caridad del Riesgo y Calero, died a few days later. Alfonso was raised by his father, Alfonso Bernal y Tovar, and other family members. His father was Professor of Pharmacy at the University of Havana.

Bernal del Riesgo's secondary studies were conducted at Belén College. He completed a Bachelor of Science and Arts at the Institute of Secondary Education of Havana in 1919. He obtained a doctorate on Civil Law in 1923 and a second doctorate on Philosophy and Arts in 1928, both at the University of Havana. Alfonso Bernal del Riesgo had a distinguished career at the university. He organized, and was a prominent speaker at, the First Revolutionary Student Congress in 1923. He also led the student group Renovación, responsible for promoting the University Reform of 1924. He was a comrade of Julio Antonio Mella and with him participated in the founding of the Communist Party of Cuba in 1925. Bernal del Riesgo and Mella also founded the Instituto Ariel centers of secondary education where both were teachers. His political activism as a lawyer and educator led him to exile in Vienna (1931-1933), where he studied psychology. Upon his return to Cuba, he worked as a professor and as a psychologist

He wrote a number of texts in the field of psychology. His scholarly contributions and published writings were recognized by the national and international scientific community. Some of his articles and books are available on the web

The last years of his life were devoted to research at the Center of Scientific Information of the University of Havana. He died at the age 73.

== Legacy ==
His scientific productivity reflects the development of his political, social, and scientific thought. Among his major contributions are:

- The educational reforms and the restructuring of the University of Havana.
- Establishing a psychology curriculum distinct from other disciplines and resulting in the establishing of the School of Psychology (Facultad de Psicología).
- Linking advanced psychological theories, research, and practice to Cuban cultural roots and contexts.
- Advanced the theory and practice of psychotherapy and was an early proponent for integrative psychotherapy approaches.

Bernal del Riesgo actively participated in processes that led to the University Reform. Among the achievements of this Reform was the institutionalization of training on psychology in Cuba. His interest in education for the people is evidenced by his sustained participation throughout his life in the mass media, explaining psychological phenomena in lay terms, and offering guidance and education to parents, as well as in adult education.

== Chronology ==
Years	Events
1920–1930	Doctoral degree in Civil Law at the University of Havana.; Keynote address at the First Congress Student Revolutionary on "Principles, tactics and goals of the university revolution"; Founded the; Founder of the Communist Party of Cuba (August 16) with Julio Antonio Mella, Carlos Baliño Carlos Baliño, Miguel Valdéz, Favio Grobart, and Enrique Flores Magán.; Founded Ariel Polytechnic Institute with Julio Antonio Mella.; Doctoral degree in philosophy. Doctoral Dissertation was on: The Psychology of José Ingenieros.
1931–1940	He was exiled for political reasons to Vienna, where he studied psychology (1931–1933). He was a student of Adler.; Upon returning to Cuba, he joined the University of Havana as a professor.; He published an introduction to psychology text "Iniciación de la Psicología" [Introduction to psychology] (1936).
1941–1950	Member of the American Psychological Association in 1948.; President of the Association of Teachers of Cuba.; Promoted the independence of psychology as a science and was successful in having psychology courses taught as part of the curriculum of Education, Law, and Philosophy.; Lead the creation of the licenciatura of Psychology and was one of the founders of the School of Psychology at the College of Sciences of the University of Havana.; Had a distinguished participation in the Society of Advertisers and was responsible for Education and Culture section of the newspaper "Claridad".; Published several texts, including: 1. Iniciación de ensayos y prácticas [Introduction to essays and practices] (1941); 2. Cívica Superior [Higher Civics] (1944); 3. Psicología humana [Human Psychology] (1946); 4. Psicología general [General Psychology] (1946)
1951–1960	He was an invited professor at the School of Psychology at the Universidad de Las Villas.; Founded the Journal of Cuban Psychology in 1955, serving as its president and editor-in-chief.; Developed the professional practice of psychology in Cuba, inaugurating Vocational Guidance Services, Parent Guidance, Psychological Assessment and Psychotherapy.; He completed the Spanish translation and adaptation of the Minnesota Multiphasic Personality Inventory in 1949; Published the article: "50 años de Psicología en Cuba" [50 years of psychology in Cuba] (1955); Published several texts in 1959, including: 1. Psicología y Enfermedad [Psychology and Illness]; 2. Realidad de la Reforma y Reforma de la Realidad [Reality of the reform or reform of the reality]; 3. Informe de Investigación sobre los Clientes Dentales [Research report on dental clients]; Published "Errores en la Crianza de los Niños" [Errors in child parenting] (1960)
1961–1970	Participated in the founding of the School of Psychology, Faculty of Science (University Reform). The department heads were: Dr. Alfonso Bernal del Riesgo (General Psychology) and Dr. Diego González Martín (Clinical), Dr. Gustavo Toroella (Education) and Dr. Aníbal Rodríguez (Social).; Published "Operatorio de Psicología: La maravillosa historia de la vida" [Operative Psychology: The wonderful story of life] (1965).; Published "Informe sobre adiestramiento de profesores universitarios" [The recruitment and training of university teachers] (1967).; He was a researcher and editor of a journal at the University of Havana and worked there until his death.; Simultaneously attending job functions of the Information Center with clinical practice responsibilities at the Ministry of the Interior Clinic.; Drafts a book titled: "Un mal social y su tratamiento" [A social illness and its treatment] (1968).; Lecture at Santa Clara University "El psicólogo y la psicoterapia" [Psychologists and psychotherapy] (1969).; Published a second edition of "Psicología General" [General Psychology] (1969).
1971–1980	Published paper "Psicoterapia y Desarrollo" [Psychotherapy and development]. (1974).; Keynote address on psychotherapy at the Regional Conference of Psychology in Santi-Spiritu, Cuba.; Published a report on the dialogue in psychology (1974).; Died on January 4, 1975.
1992	His legacy is honored with the inauguration of the psychology training center of the University of Havana titled "Centro de Orientación y Asistencia Psicológica - Alfonso Bernal del Riesgo".
2002	Recognition from the Society Cuban Psychologists as one of the key founders of the College of Psychology at the University of Havana.

== Major publications ==
- Bernal del Riesgo, A. (1923). Los principios, la táctica y los fines de la revolución universitaria. [The principles, tactics, and goals of the university revolution]. En O. Cabrera & C. Almodóbar (Eds.), Las luchas estudiantiles universitarias [ The university student struggles] (pp. 95–109). La Habana: Editorial Ciencias Sociales.
- Bernal del Riesgo, A. (1935). La Psicología del Pensamiento de C. Buhler. [The psychology of thought of C. Buhler]. Revista Bimensual Cubana, 35(1), 5-24.
- Bernal del Riesgo, A. (1935). Un Examen de los Exámenes. Revista Bimenstral Cubana, 36(1 & 2), 5-26.
- Bernal del Riesgo, A. (1936). Iniciación de la psicología. [Introduction to psychology]. La Habana: F. Sabini.
- Bernal del Riesgo, A. (1937). La Sociología de Agramonte. [The sociology of Agramonte]. Universidad Habana., 5(14), 154–155.
- Bernal del Riesgo, A. (1941). El instituto de prácticas y ensayos. [The institute of practice and essays]. Crítica y reforma universitarias. La Habana: Imprenta de la Universidad de la Habana.
- Bernal del Riesgo, A. (1944). Cívica Superior. [Higher civics]. Cuba: Universidad de la Habana.
- Bernal del Riesgo, A. (1944). Cuestiones Futuras de la Enseñanza Cubana. [Future questions of Cuban education]' La Habana: Editorial Selecta.
- Bernal del Riesgo, A. (1946). Psicología humana. [Human psychology]. Habana: Imprenta de la Universidad de la Habana.
- Bernal del Riesgo, A. (1946). Psicología humana; curso panorámico. [Human psychology: a panoramic course]. Habana: Imprenta De La Universidad de La Habana.
- Bernal del Riesgo, A., & Fernández, E. (1949). The MMPI in Cuba. Habana: Universidad de la Habana.
- Bernal del Riesgo, A. (1951). Informe que eleva la Oficina de Psicometría y Orientación Vocacional al Señor Ministro de Educación. [Report from the Office of Psichometry and Vocational Orientation to the Minister of Education]. La Habana: Ministerio de Educación.
- Bernal del Riesgo, A. (1955). 50 años de Psicología en Cuba. [50 years of psychology in Cuba]. Revista Cubana de Psicología, 1(1), 5–10.
- Bernal del Riesgo, A. (1959). Informe sobre la investigación de la clientela dental. [Report of research on dental clients]. Revista Estomatológica de la Habana (5-6), 13–56.
- Bernal del Riesgo, A., Colon, A., Fernández, E., Mena, A., Torres, A., & Torres, E. (1959). Traducción del Inventario Multifacético de la Personalidad. [Translation of Minnesota Multiphasic Personality Inventory]. New York: Psychological Corporation.
- Bernal del Riesgo, A. (1959). Psicología y enfermedad. [Psychology and illness]. Habana: Imprenta de la Universidad de la Habana.
- Bernal del Riesgo, A. (1959). Realidad de la reforma o reforma de la realidad. [Reality of the reform or reform of the reality]. La Nueva Revista Cubana, 1(3), 14.
- Bernal del Riesgo, A. (1960). Apuntes de Psicología General 2. [Notes on general psychology 2]. Habana: Imprenta de la Universidad de la Habana.
- Bernal del Riesgo, A. (1960). Apuntes Psicología General 1. [Notes on general psychology 1]. La Habana: Imprenta de la Universidad de la Habana.
- Bernal del Riesgo, A. (1960). Errores en la crianza de los niños. [Errors in child rearing]. México, MX: Ediciones El Caballito.
- Bernal del Riesgo, A. (1962). Informe (de la investigación inconclusa) del brote asmático. [Report (of the incompleted study) on the asthmatic attack]. Habana: Universidad de la Habana.
- Bernal del Riesgo, A. (1963). Orientación, contenido y funciones de la psicología en Cuba. [Orientation, content and functions of psychology in Cuba]. (Vol. 15). Habana: Comisión superior de docencia de la Universidad de la Habana.
- Bernal del Riesgo, A. (published as Nalber Gosier). (1963). ¿Quinta rueda o qué? Diálogo sobre la psicología. [ ¿Fifth wheel or what? Dialogue on psychology]. (pp. 8). Habana: Universidad de la Habana.
- Bernal del Riesgo, A. (1965). Operatorio de Psicología: La maravillosa historia de la vida. [Operative Psychology: The wonderful story of life]. Habana: Universidad de la Habana.
- Bernal del Riesgo, A. (1967). Apuntes de Psicología y Enfermedad. [Psychology Notes and Disease].
- Bernal del Riesgo, A. (1967). Cuba. In IAUPL (Ed.), The recruitment and training of university teachers. Ghent, Belgium: International Association of University Professor and Lecturers.
- Bernal del Riesgo, A. (1969). Modus Operandi Completo en el Pilotaje [Complete Modus Operandi for pilot studies] .
- Bernal del Riesgo, A. (1970). Un mal social y su tratamiento. [A social illness and its treatment]. Habana: Libro inédito.
- Bernal del Riesgo, A. (1971). Primer vistazo a la Psicología aplicada al usuario. [A first view at psychology applied to the user]. Cuadernos de Información Científica. Serie 1. Ciencia y Tecnología de la Información. No. 4. Habana: Universidad de la Habana.
