= Candler College and Colegio Buenavista =

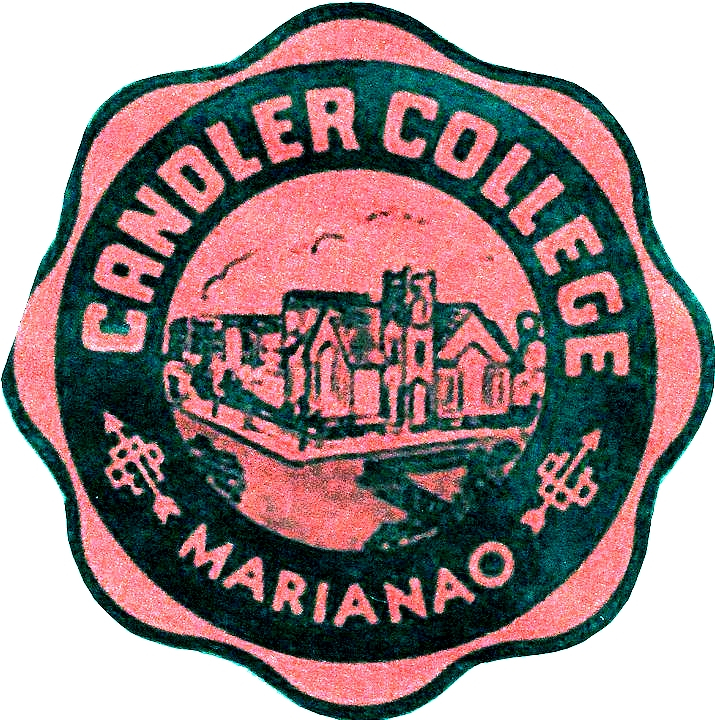

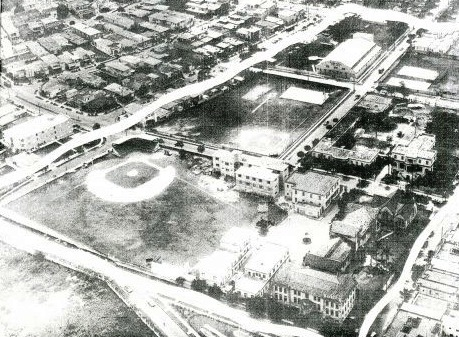
- Interactive map of the Candler College and Colegio Buenavista area

General information
- Type: Educational
- Architectural style: Art deco-eclectic
- Location: Marianao, (Calle 54) y Gutiérrez (Ave. 43), Ciudad de La Habana, Cuba
- Coordinates: 23°06′15.768″N 82°24′56.232″W
- Current tenants: Empty
- Construction started: 1899 Candler C.
- Opened: 1920 C. Buenavista
- Closed: 1961
- Owner: Revolutionary government (contested) (Note: This theft of private property led the U.S. into severing diplomatic relations in 1961 and installing the trade embargo and various sanctions against Cuba. "Thousands of Americans and Cuban citizens suffered humiliation and financial distresses of having their private property stolen from them, some of them at gunpoint. Today there has been no justice for that their claims.")
- Affiliation: Southern Methodist

Technical details
- Structural system: Column & slab
- Material: Concrete
- Floor count: 3
- Grounds: 32,000 square meters

Design and construction
- Known for: English & theological education

References
- https://web.archive.org/web/20120410190109/http://candlercollege.org/

Candler College and Colegio Buenavista were educational institutions founded in Havana, Cuba by the United States Southern Methodist Episcopal Church. They were founded on two different dates, Candler College in 1899 and Colegio Buenavista in 1920. They both ceased to exist in 1961 when they were nationalized by the revolutionary government of Fidel Castro.

== Administration ==
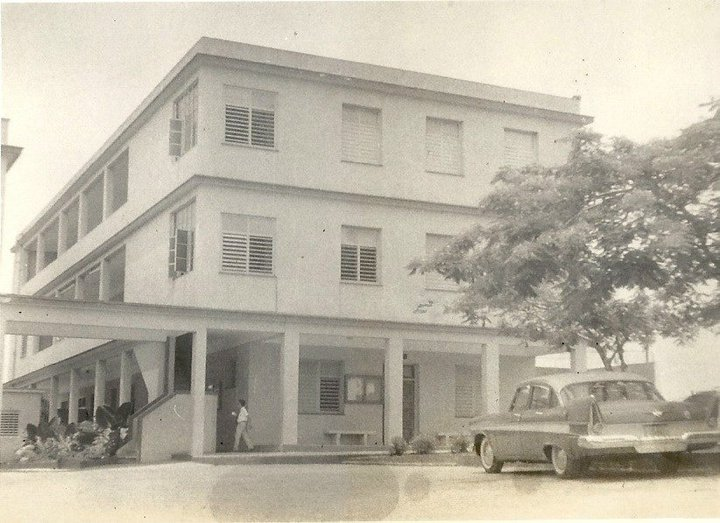

These schools intended to provide bilingual education in Spanish and English, based on the Christian faith. They offered from the pre-school level until finishing high school to Cuban children and youth, as part of the mission of the church on the island.

Although they were administered by different dependencies of the Methodist Church of Florida, these two schools developed all their activities in coordination. Candler College offered elementary education only to boys while Colegio Buenavista provided primary education for girls. Young girls enrolled in Buenavista attended secondary education programs at Candler College; they only received religion and physical education classes at the Buenavista facilities. Some of Candler's boys did the seventh and eighth grades in English at Colegio Buenavista to be able to follow the United States High School curriculum. The younger boys also went to Kindergarten along with the girls. Candler College had a boarding school for boys only. Similarly, Buenavista provided the boarding for young girls and ladies. The two schools had separate lunch services for students who did not live a short distance away from them.

In order to give its graduates and other students, the opportunity to continue university studies, at Candler College Candler University was organized in 1956, opening the Faculties of Pedagogy, Languages, Philosophy, and Letters, Pharmacy and Commercial Sciences to begin in 1957.

These institutions grew in number of students and in prestige over the years until their educational work was interrupted in 1961 when the Castro regime nationalized all the private educational establishments (religious and lay). During the years in which Candler College and Colegio Buenavista existed, both schools provided a successful service to Cuban youth preparing their students for civic life by providing, in addition to official instruction, an integral formation based on Christian, moral and patriotic values.

== History ==
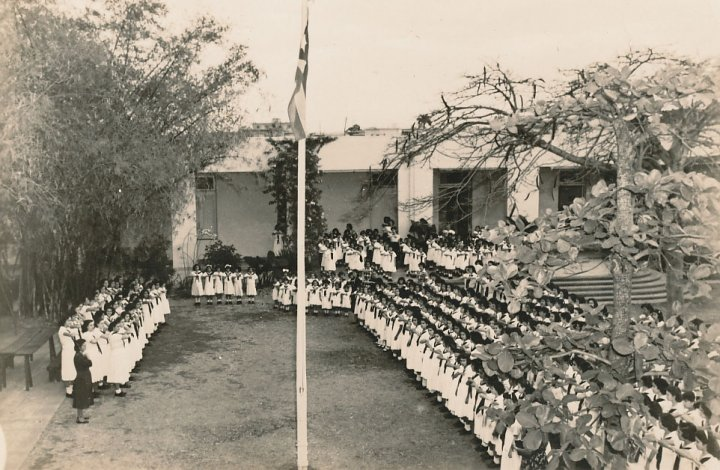

The first Methodist school in Cuba was founded in 1899 by the American missionary Thad E. Leland on Calle Virtudes de La Habana. This was founded when the Bishop of the Methodist Church of Florida, the Rev. Warren Akin Candler, proposed to give a new impetus to the missionary work begun in Cuba in 1883, through educational projects. In 1903 this school was named Candler College in honor of Bishop Candler.

The Reverend H. B. Bardwell, a missionary in Cuba since 1903, succeeded the reverends E.E Clements and B.F. Gilbert as director of the College in 1909. Aware of the need to expand, the Mission Board of the Florida Conference acquired a vast tract of land in La Ceiba, Marianao, where the first building for the new headquarters was built in 1912 of the school, inaugurated in January 1913. For some time, the school in Havana and the new headquarters functioned under the same name until they were organized as independent colleges. The headquarters of Havana was called Central Methodist College and that of Marianao retained the name Candler College. In addition to offering elementary and secondary education, between 1924 and 1946 at Candler College, a theological seminary was held, the School of Pastors, which was under the direction of the Reverend B. F. Gilbert followed by the Reverend E.E, Clements.

The Reverend Bardwell directed Candler College for forty years, during which the spirit of the college was consolidated. He was replaced in 1949 by the Reverend Carlos Pérez Ramos, who had been assistant director since 1946. Under his direction, the school continued to grow and other buildings and facilities were built to meet new requirements.

Colegio Buenavista was founded in 1920 by the Women's Missionary Board of the Methodist Church to provide a Christian education for girls and young women and to respond to the request of the parents of Candler College students who demanded an education for their daughters of a quality similar to that of their brothers. This women's school began to operate in a residence surrounded by gardens that acquired the church across Miramar street, along the side of the Candler. In addition to offering primary education for girls, between 1926 and 1938 in Buenavista worked a Normal School that prepared hundreds of teachers, directed by Dr. Luis Alonso.

Until 1960, the directors of Colegio Buenavista were American missionaries who had carried out evangelization and social work for the Methodist Church in different parts of the island. Under his direction the school grew at the same pace as Candler College. Miss Belle Markey, the first director, was followed by Miss Junia Jones and then by Miss Ione Clay, who held the position for more than 25 years, until her retirement in 1956, and was replaced by Miss Juanita Kelly, who was succeeded by Miss Lorraine Buck. Four months before the nationalization of the school, the Reverend Humberto Carrazana, pastor of the Methodist Church of Marianao, was named director of Colegio Buenavista.

For several decades, the schools were considered among the best in Cuba and "many graduates were accepted in the best universities in the United States without taking admission exams." Some banks and other commercial companies often offered vacant positions to students of the school that were close to finishing their studies of Accountant and Secretariat.

== Location, buildings and facilities ==
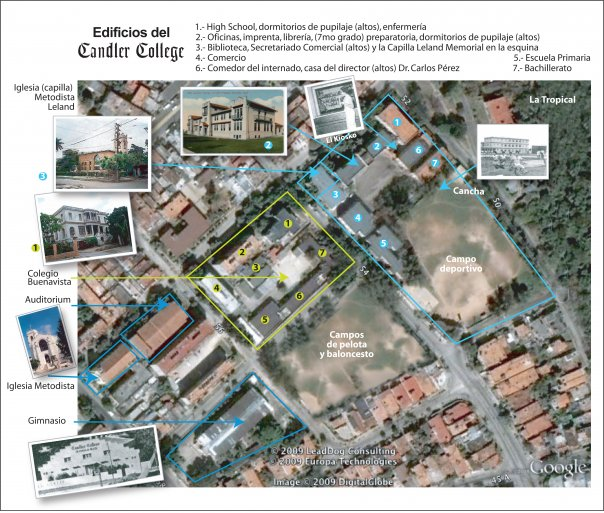

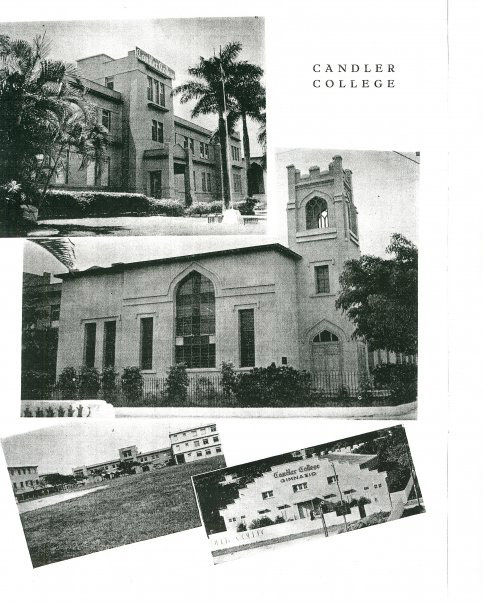
Buildings of Candler College

Candler College was located in the southeastern corner of the intersection of Miramar (Calle 54) and Gutiérrez (Ave. 43) in La Ceiba neighbourhood, Marianao. Candler's main entrance was on Gutiérrez Street (Ave.43) and gave access to the gardens in the front part of the main building, where the offices were on the ground floor and the bedrooms for the pupils in the second and third floors. Through this entrance, taking to the left, were the Martian Corner and the two-story building where the High School classes were held. At the back of this building, which opened onto Calle Lanuza (Calle 52), an entrance was opened for the students of Candler University. There were three other entrances on Calle Miramar (Ave. 54): one that was used to enter the Chapel, the next allowed the entrance of cars to the esplanade and parking place; this entrance had on the right the two-story building of the School of Commerce, with its well-equipped classrooms and spacious corridors, and to the left was the Library building, which also had two floors. Surrounding the esplanade were the back of the main building with its long corridors, the front of the High School building, the dining room and kitchen with the apartment for the director on the second floor and the three-story building that occupied the School of Baccalaureate, with its laboratories and the Museum of Natural Sciences, in addition to classrooms. Separated by a fence was the field for sports, the squash court and beyond the ground and the ballpark. The third entrance was the building of the Elementary School, in front of Font Street (Ave. 45). On the opposite side of the street, there was another sports field on the corner of 54th Street and 45th Ave. The Gymnasium, with its modern wooden floor for playing basketball and indoor volleyball and a stage at the back, was located in the southwest corner of 56th Street and 45th Ave.

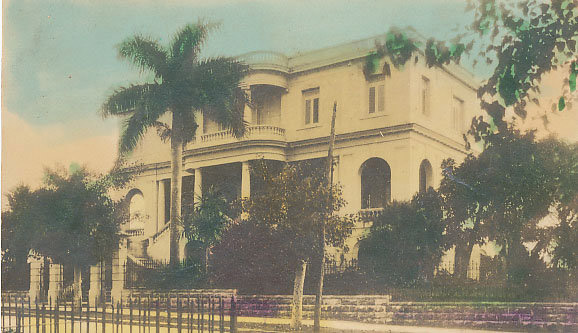
The main building of Buenavista on 54th Street

Colegio Buenavista was located in front of the entrances on the side of Candler, on the southwestern corner of 54th Street and 43rd Avenue. The main Buenavista building had three entrances on Calle Miramar (Calle 54): the first was a gate to enter the main building, the beautiful mansion that was adapted to the initial needs of the school. On the ground floor were: the materials room, the kitchen, the dining room, and two classrooms. On the facade there were two converging stairs on a large terrace that gave access to the offices, the library, and the hall, from where a corridor led to the infirmary, the bedrooms and bathrooms for the pupils and the director, on the second floor. On the third floor, there were more bedrooms for the older pupils and the missionaries. To the left of this building, there was an entrance for cars, gardens, a garage, and a small room. A hallway to the left led to the classrooms, lined along 54th Street and 45th Ave, which limited the large courtyard with its gardens. This included recreational areas, the platform for cultural activities, the Martian Corner and, on the other side, the tennis and volleyball court. A third entrance to the gardens of Calle Miramar led to a vestibule that separated a small religious meditation room and a classroom and the long corridor that gave access to classrooms. There was also an entrance through the back of the patio, on Calle Primelles (Calle 56). Crossing this street, a small door allowed access to the sports ground for the students of Buenavista. The Auditorium of both schools was built next to this land, located in the south-western corner of 56th Street and 43rd Ave. Diagonal to this, in the northeast corner, with the entrance by Ave. 43, was the building of two stories with a smaller playground for students from pre-school to third grade.

Both schools in total occupied a vast lot whose area of more than 32,000 square meters was bounded by 45th Ave to the south, 52nd Street to the east, 58th Street to the west and 43rd Ave to the north. This large area was crossed by three streets: Calle 54, Ave. 45 and Calle 56, which separated the buildings of the schools and the sports grounds, the gymnasium, and the auditorium.

== Basics ==
Candler College and Buenavista College were grounded in the creed and discipline of the Methodist church. They were opened to prepare students for their future life outside of school on the basis of Christian faith and practice as well as moral, civic and patriotic values. Its purposes were to provide a comprehensive education that would contribute to the personal development of students as individuals and members of society and raise the educational level of the newly founded republic.

=== Methodist approach ===
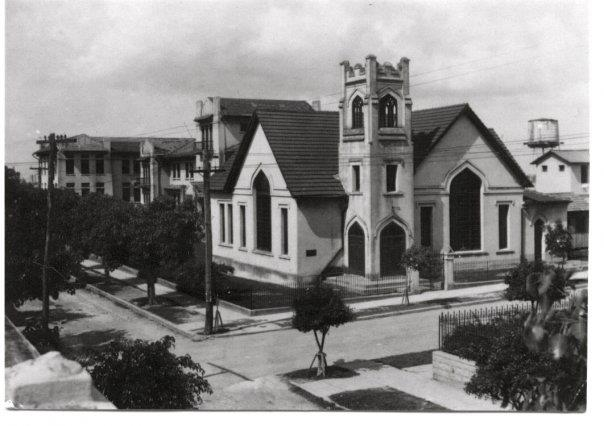
Candler College Chapel. Corner of 54th Street and 43rd Avenue

According to the thought of John Wesley, a good education was considered "one of the best ways to transform individuals, communities and societies as a whole" for their betterment and the glory of God. Education was not only the acquisition of academic knowledge but also wisdom and humility, which was founded on the teachings of Christ, in order to grow intellectually, personally and spiritually. The search for truth was encouraged through reason, research and debate, based on freedom of thought and expression. High academic standards were promoted as well as the development of talents through varied activities. As a result, challenges were posed to students, they were inspired and supported to achieve their best through self-discipline and a strong work ethic.

Candler and Buenavista maintained a distinctive approach to education that incorporated Christian ethical values. The Methodist Social Creed emphasizes interest in social welfare and justice as well as the need to combat prejudice and intolerance in whatever form they take by strengthening mutual respect and understanding. So tolerant attitudes and behaviors were reinforced, respectful and non-discriminatory.

It was hoped that students would learn to differentiate good and evil based on Christian and moral values. Family values based on love and mutual understanding and support were an important part of the formation of students.

High ideals of patriotism were present in the education of the students: love their homeland and be loyal to it, respect and honor the national emblems and recognize the merits of the main forgers of the nation, know its history, culture and traditions as well as the achievements of the newly created republic and interested in the needs and problems of its people and their efforts to solve them.

The civic values of freedom and democracy and the norms of coexistence related to rights and duties had a central place in the task of preparing future citizens as well as inculcating good manners and the appropriate habits required to live in society.

The strong ties with the Florida Methodist Church Conference, which partially supported both colleges, were evident in the influence of American culture and traditions in schools. The flag of the United States was present in all the parties and ceremonies along with the Cuban flag and the national anthems of the two countries were sung.

== Hymns and emblems ==
The principle adopted by Candler College as a guide was Consilio et Prudentia (Wisdom and Prudence). The motto of Colegio Buenavista, which appears on his seal, was Esse quam Videri (Ser instead of appearing). The pennants of Candler College bore the distinctive colors of the school, red and black. Those of Buenavista the orange and the black. The hymns of the schools were the following:

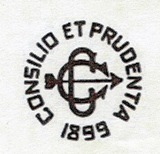
Logo Candler College

Logo Candler College

1 Hail Candler! Emblem for always of nobility and virtue Holy Mother of the soul you teach us the truth and rectitude. As a beacon that the sad sailor in the night will guide you are light that the path of the student with knowledge will illuminate.

Chorus: Candler, Candler pay tribute always loyal children the name of the Alma Mater exalted.

2 With affection your children happy today want everyone to sing hymn of your glorious traditions, your great name to celebrate. Your ideals, like treasured jewels, will adorn the homeland. Your grateful precepts children in the soul will keep.

Chorus

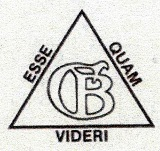
Logo Colegio Buena Vista

Buenavista School

1 To the school beloved by all we sing a hymn in praise promising to always be faithful to its emblem that is honor and love. Companions sing the hymn of the beloved school in honor Buenavista you will be our beacon for your name we will know how to succeed.

Chorus: Compañeras let's sing the hymn of the beloved school in praise Buenavista! let's say happy! Buenavista! with deep emotion.

2 Buenavista your glorious name expression of your life gives us our breasts will be your bulwark, by your name we will succeed. Buenavista that always loving teaching and affection you give us and the august knowledge you give us to enter the better life. Chorus

3 Compañeras the work we follow and let all of us guide our duty by always promising to be faithful, respecting the voice of their law. Companions we sing the hymn of the beloved school in praise and its echoes resound gloriously like a psalm that reaches God. Chorus

== Academic structure ==
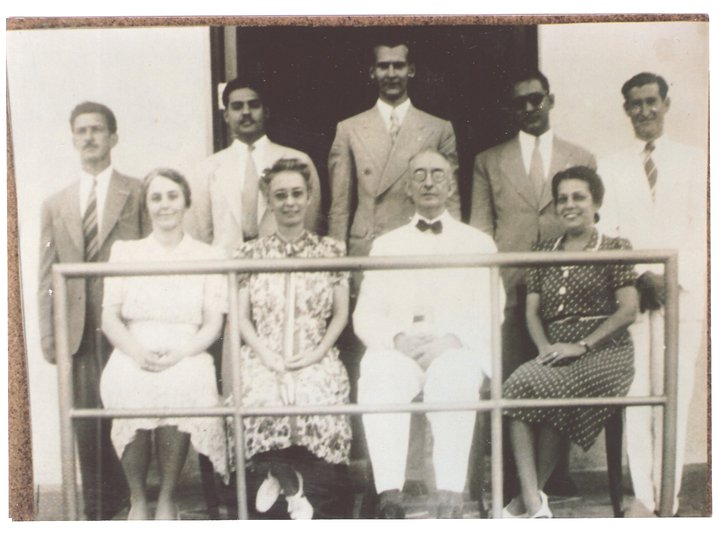
Candler College Faculty

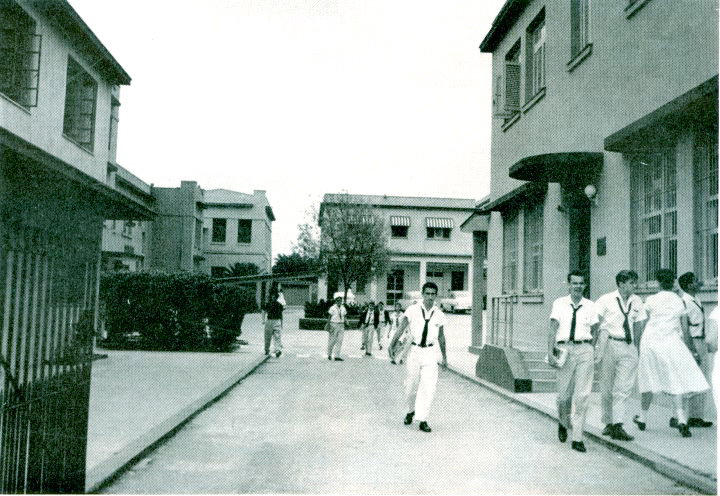
Students at Candler College ca. 1955

Candler College consisted of four schools, each coordinated by a sub-director:

- Elementary School, which included a pre-primary education degree and seven primary education grades (the latter was called preparatory). At the end of the sixth grade students could enter the Baccalaureate if they passed in any of the public secondary schools the official entrance exam that was required.
- Baccalaureate school, high school in Spanish, which comprised five years. In the latter, students could choose between two branches: Science and Letters. The students left prepared to continue studies of higher education in the different careers that were offered in the country at the university level.
- School of Commerce, consisting of two different branches: Accountant and Secretariat, which initially were programs of three years each. But from the course of 1957–58 Contador was extended to four years. Upon completion of studies in these programs, students were prepared to enter the world of work in commercial enterprises or where office work would be required.
- High School in English, which consisted of four years of secondary education that prepared the student to continue studies of higher education in the United States.

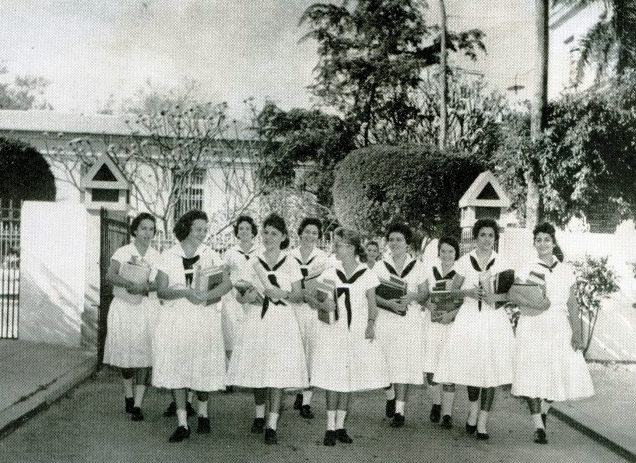

Colegio Buenavista offered preschool (Kindergarten and Pre-primary) and primary education in Spanish and English from first to eighth grades. Her students continued secondary education at Candler College.

The curriculum corresponded to the graduate school model adopted in Cuba at the beginning of the twentieth century, which implies the progressive nature of the teaching-learning process so that the contents of the subjects were sequenced progressively from pre-school to secondary education.

Candler College and Buenavista followed the official programs for the Primary School and the Bachillerato proposed by the Cuban Ministry of Education, which determined in a precise way the contents for the subjects of each grade in the Study Plans, as well as the time required for each one. The teachers selected the textbooks and the materials among those prepared by authors Cubans. Primary Education in Spanish and the Baccalaureate had official recognition, as there were supervisors from the Ministry of Education who periodically visited the primary school classes. The Baccalaureate School was incorporated the Secondary Education Institute of Marianao, so that the students had to present exams of each subject before professors of this institute twice a year to obtain the accreditation of their results, and at the end, the diploma official that would allow them to enter the university. In the School of Commerce the professors prepared the study plans. The textbooks and materials were selected by them among those offered by the publishing houses and were available in the bookstores. The curricula for the High School followed the curriculum of the United States and the texts were brought from there. The schedules, the spaces and the didactic resources were conceived and managed in coordination by the sub-directors and teachers. They were autonomous to conduct the teaching-learning process. Each teacher was free to choose the teaching methods and teaching materials he or she considered most convenient for each subject and was responsible for the evaluation of the students, including the observation of their difficulties and needs in order to improve their performance. Grades or grades were reported monthly to the parents of the students.

Religious education was important in both schools. The Bible classes were part of the curriculum in all grades. The students not only read the history and teachings of Jesus and the apostles in the New Testament, they also learned about the history of the Hebrew people, their leaders, prophets, and other characters; they also learned the Ten Commandments and read the Psalms and Proverbs in the Old Testament. Worshiping God and praying were part of the students' formation. Twice a week the students of Buenavista and the boys of Candler in the Chapel met separately, where the word of God was preached and topics related to spiritual, moral, civic and patriotic values were discussed.

== Extracurricular activities ==
Students at both schools had opportunities to supplement their academic instruction through a number of sports and various extracurricular activities:

=== Sports ===
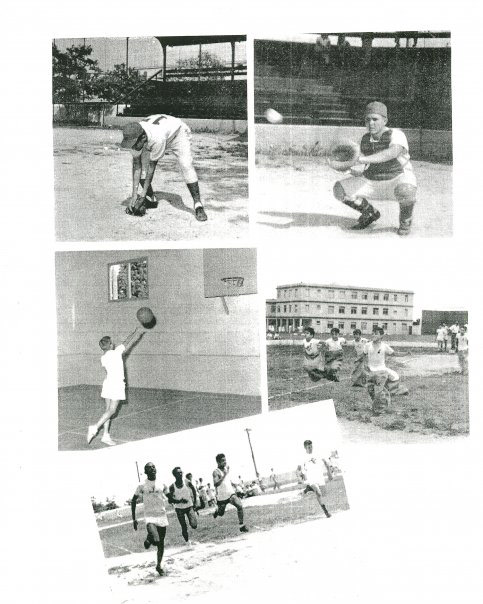

Athletics and sports were always practiced in Candler. In the beginning, the favorite sports were tennis and field and track. Later, students also practiced softball, basketball, volleyball, and judo. Some students could participate in teams that were specially trained to compete in the intercollegiate championships. Candler College won various trophies in baseball and basketball.

They also played sports in Buenavista: softball, kickball, volleyball, and basketball. Teams were trained with the best players to also participate in intercollegiate competitions.

=== Music ===
In Buenavista there was a Music Department that, in addition to the regular music classes included in the curricula, offered piano and solfeggio and music theory lessons. The students could take these classes in their free time or at the end of the school day each day. The annual Recital was a tradition of many years, in which the students who took piano lessons played a piece of classical music. In this one also participated the Rhythmic Band.

In the decades of 1940 and 1950, there was also a school band that participated in parades or patriotic celebrations and played the National Anthem during the salute to the flag.

In addition, choirs were specially prepared to participate in festivals and other celebrations.

Since 1958 a choir was organized with students from both schools.

=== Other extracurricular activities ===
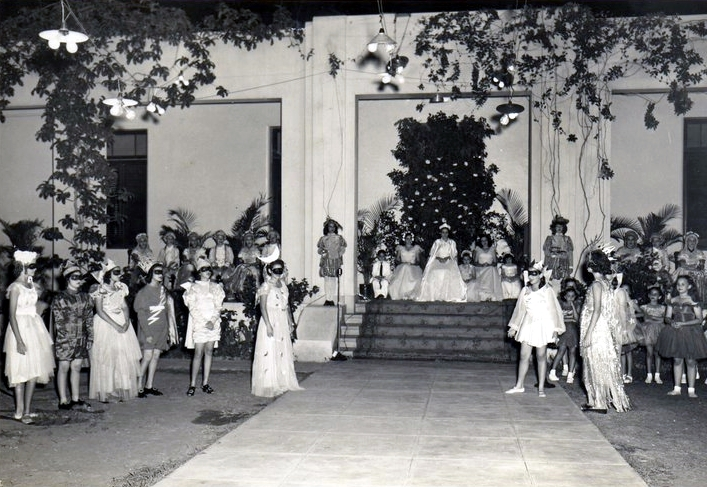
Evening extracurricular activity at Colegio Buenavista. ca 1955

At different times, some groups of students interested in literature, musical appreciation, theater, oratory, or the publication of a newspaper were organized, guided by a teacher or counselor.

The excursions were traditional opportunities to visit places near the school or historical or recreational places in different parts of the country.

At Candler College, there was also a troop of Boy Scouts.

In addition, festivals, bazaars, theatrical performances, Christmas celebrations and others that were part of the annual planning of school activities were organized.

== Student body ==
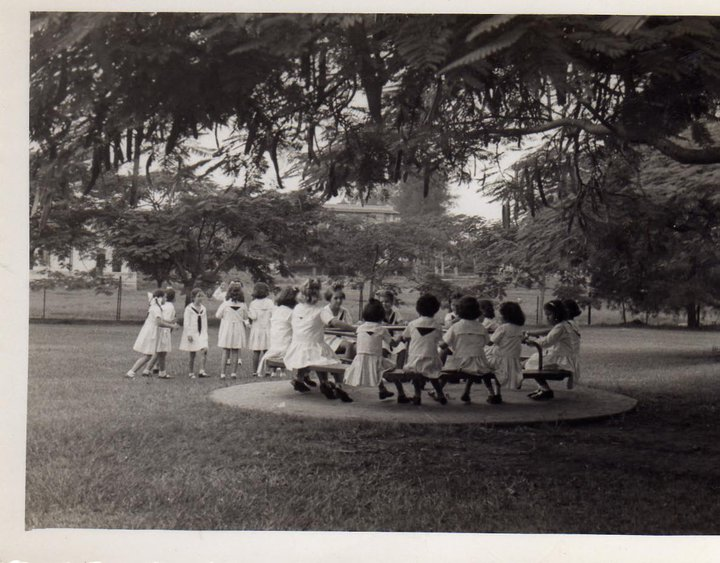
Buena Vista students on the "tio vivo."

The two schools did not admit exclusively Methodist or Protestant students. The majority of the students were Catholic and there were also some students Jews. Due to the good level in the teaching of the English language, Candler and Buenavista were chosen by many parents of students foreigners who lived in Cuba.

In the sixty-two years of existence of Candler College and forty-one of Buenavista, many thousands of students left the schools prepared to continue their studies or enter the world of work and become good citizens. They were equipped with solid foundations of religious faith and moral values to cope with life after school.

=== Alumni Associations ===
The Candler Fraternity was the association of graduates and alumni of Candler College. The former students of Buenavista belonged to the Association of Former Students of Colegio Buenavista.

Many alumni and teachers of Candler and Buenavista left their country in the early 1960s when the revolution that took power in 1959 turned to socialism. Others emigrated later. The majority went to live in the United States, concentrating on the largest number in Florida. Some of those who have been in contact have met on different occasions to remember the old times and reaffirm the spirit of the schools that they all share.

The former students of Candler and Buenavista who remained in Cuba have formed the Candler-Buenavista Fraternity and meet annually since 1999.

== Gallery ==
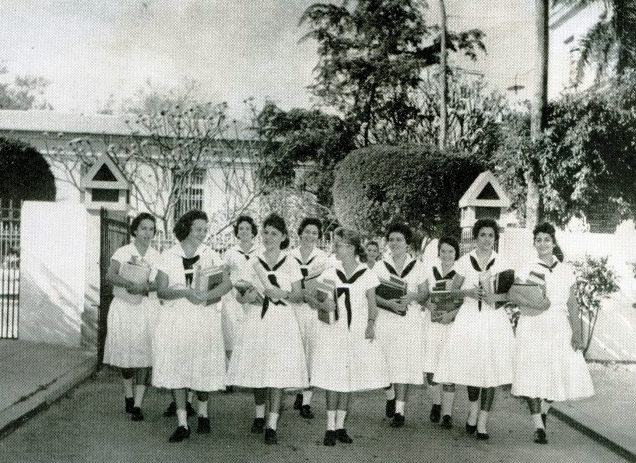
Students of Colegio Buenavista

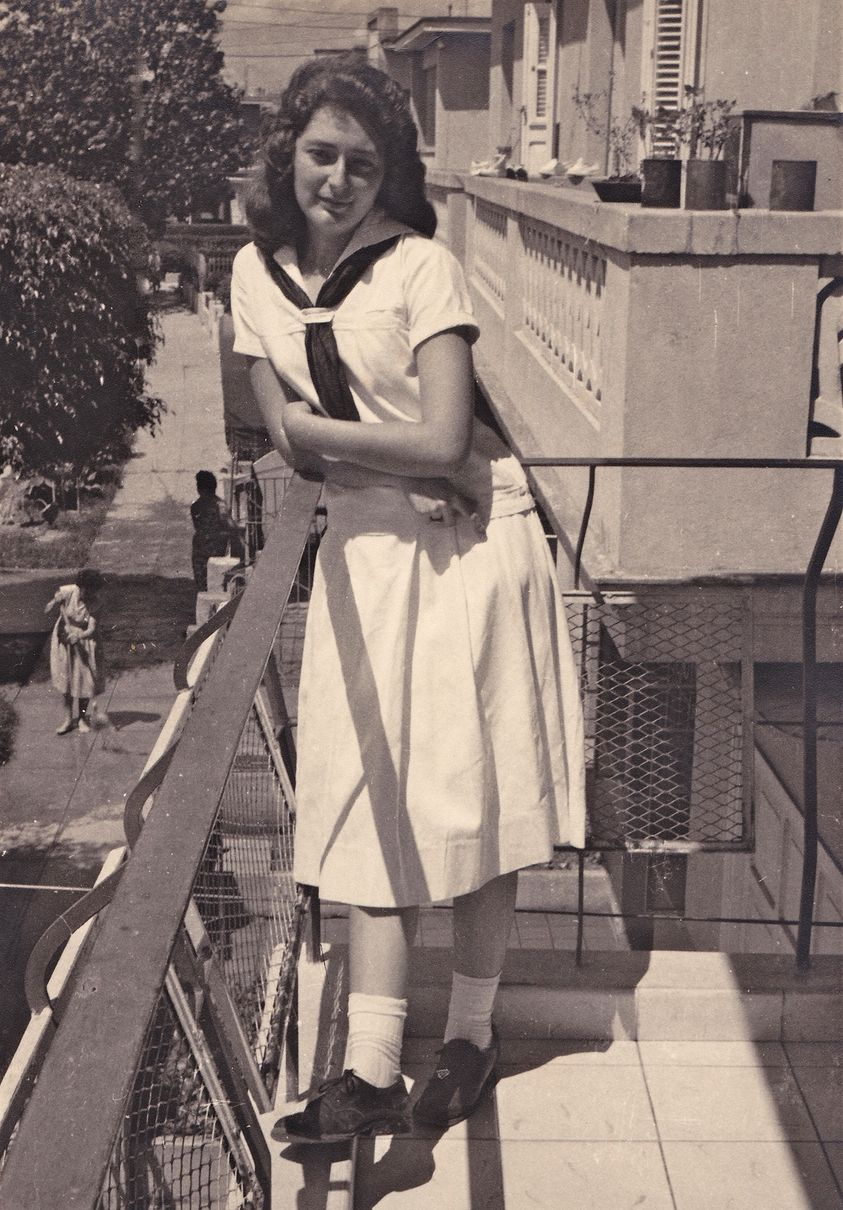

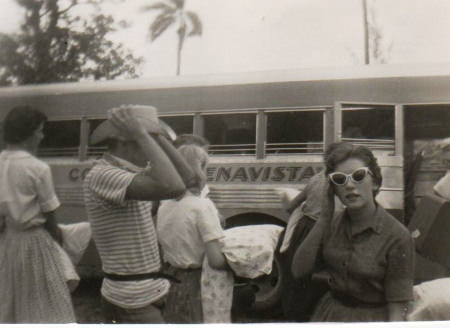
Bus trip in 1959
