= Howell Meadors Henry =

Howell Meadors Henry (August 18, 1879 - 1956) was a history professor, dean, and author in the United States. He wrote The Police Control of the Slave in South Carolina. He was a segregationist and held discriminatory views of African Americans.

Born in Newberry, South Carolina, Henry received a B.A. from Newberry College, an M.A. from Vanderbilt University in 1908, and a PhD from Vanderbilt in 1913. He was a history professor and dean at Emory & Henry College in Emory, Virginia. He was involved in discussions over intercollegiate athletics at the college.

He married and had sons.
