= Asociación de Nuevos Emigrados Revolucionarios Cubanos =

Asociación de Nuevos Emigrados Revolucionarios Cubanos (Association of Cuban Revolutionary New Emigrants) was a Cuban leftist group organized in Mexico in 1926 by Julio Antonio Mella.

ANERC would expand beyond Mexico, opening branches in New York and Paris. Mella served as the chairman of the organization. ANERC published the magazine Cuba Libre.

== Julio Antonio Mella ==
Julio Antonio Mella was one of the first early figures of PCC history. Mella gained popularity during the hunger strike that he started in December 1925, as a student leader protesting against the government of Gerardo Machado. Mella was exiled from Cuba in 1925 and came to Mexico in 1926. In Mexico, Mella founded the Asociación de Nuevos Emigrados Revolucionarios Cubanos. He was also actively working as a Marxist revolutionary to overthrow General Machado's dictatorship government. Mella was assassinated in Mexico in 1929. Although Mella's two killers were identified at the time, there was no official reason for Mella's death, but there were several possible parties that could have been responsible for his assassination. The Cuban government under Machado or the feuding between Stalin and Trotsky in the Soviet Union are both theories on the reason for his death.
