= Julio Antonio Mella =

Cuban communist (1903–1929)

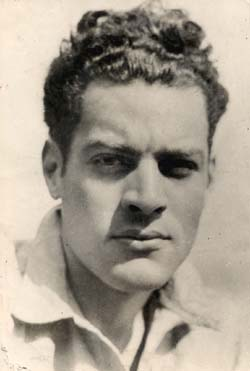
- Julio Antonio Mella in 1928
- Born: Nicanor McPartland; 25 March 1903; Havana, Cuba
- Died: 10 January 1929 (aged 25); Mexico City, Mexico
- Occupation: Journalist
- Political party: Communist Party of Cuba
- Spouse: Oliva Zaldívar Freyre

Julio Antonio Mella McPartland (born Nicanor Mella McPartland; 25 March 1903 – 10 January 1929) was a Cuban political activist, journalist, communist revolutionary, and one of the founders of the original Communist Party of Cuba. Mella studied law at the University of Havana but was expelled in 1925. He had worked against the government of Gerardo Machado, which had grown increasingly repressive. Mella left the country, reaching Central America. He traveled north to Mexico City, where he worked with other exiled dissidents and communist sympathizers against the Machado government. He was assassinated in 1929, but historians still disagree on which parties were responsible for his death. The 21st century Cuban government regards Mella as a communist hero and martyr.

== Early life ==
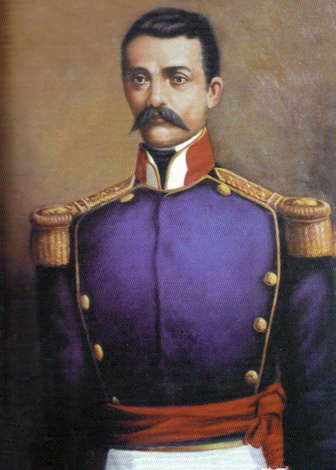
Matías Ramón Mella, Founding Father of the Dominican Republic, was Mella's paternal grandfather.

Mella was born Nicanor McPartland in 1903 in Havana. His father was Antonio Nicanor Mella Breá (1851–1929), a Dominican tailor who migrated to Cuba at some point. (Mella Breá was the youngest son of Matías Ramón Mella, who was one of the Founding Fathers of the Dominican Republic). His mother was Cecilia McPartland, a daughter of Irish immigrants. Although Cecilia was not married to Nicanor senior, they initially named Mella after his father. As children, Nicanor Mella and his younger brother Cecilio went to New Orleans with their mother while she convalesced from lung troubles. Later the boys returned to Cuba to live with their father's wife Mercedes Bermúdez Ferreira. She acted as their stepmother. At that time, Mella's name was changed from Nicanor to Antonio, and his younger brother was renamed as Nicasio Mella.

Antonio Mella engaged in secondary studies at Chandler College in Marianao, Havana, and Colegio Mimó. His step-mother, Mercedes Bermúdez Ferreira, died in 1915. After visiting the US again in 1917, Mella returned to Cuba. He prepared for the University of Havana at Academia Newton before being sent to boarding school at the prestigious Escolapios of Guanabacoa. After being expelled from there, Mella finished his secondary studies at the public Instituto de la Habana and/or Instituto de Segunda Enseñanza of Pinar del Río, in 1921.

Mella became a political activist and was first arrested during the democratic rule (1921–1924) of Alfredo Zayas. He studied law at the University of Havana, emerging as a radical leader. Students forcibly occupied Havana University and sought power through demands for changes to improve their education and academic independence, including: modernization of textbooks, autonomy for the university, free education for all, and more unusually, for students to serve as head of the university for a day.

Mella was soon involved in the political struggle against Gerardo Machado, a future Cuban president. The student organized the formal founding of the Moscow-directed, "internationalist" Partido Comunista de Cuba. At this time he was also associated with women radicals Rosario Guillaume (Charito) and Sarah Pascual. He was expelled from the university after being arrested and accused of a bomb plot. After being released from jail in late 1925, Mella fled to Central America in early 1926, and headed north to Mexico City.

== Ancestors ==
Ancestors of Julio Antonio Mella

8. Antonio Mella Álvarez (1794-1837); Santo Domingo, Dominican Republic
4. Matías Ramón Mella (1816–1864); Santo Domingo, Dominican Republic
9. Francisca Javier Castillo Álvarez (1790-1864); Santo Domingo, Dominican Republic
2. Nicanor Mella Brea; Santo Domingo, Dominican Republic
10. José Gertrudis Brea Tejeda (1787–?); Santo Domingo, Dominican Republic
5. María Josefa Brea Hernández (1814-1899); Santo Domingo, Dominican Republic
11. María Josefa Hernández Pérez (1780-1851); Santo Domingo, Dominican Republic
1. Julio Antonio Mella McPartland; Havana, Cuba
6. Thomas McPartland; Ireland
3. Cecilia McPartland (1882–?); Lisnadarragh, Ireland
7. Rose Reilly; Ireland

== Foundation of the "internationalized" Cuban Communist Party ==
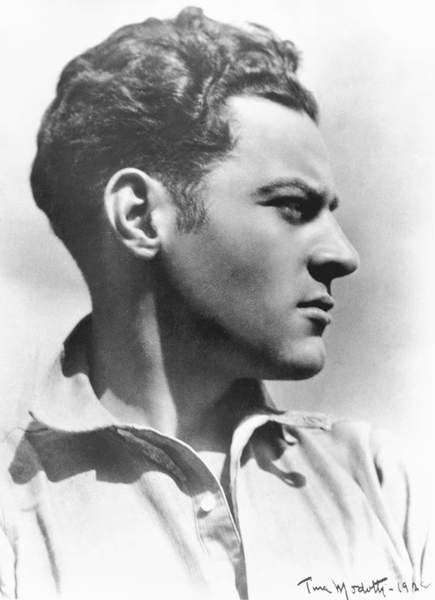
Mella in 1928

Cuba had a number of communist and/or anarchist parties, especially in Havana and in the eastern area of Cuba, at least as early as the beginning of the Cuban Republic. Possibly the first was founded in 1906 near Manzanillo by Agustín Martín Veloz (Martinillo).

The original "internationalized" Communist Party of Cuba was formed in the 1920s when Gerardo Machado was president and then dictator of the country. This organization is said to be related to several fronts, including the anti-imperialist league and its anti-clerical analogue. This party was formally recognized by Moscow in 1925. Contacts with Moscow representatives were said to be made in a restaurant at 687 Compostela Street, at the corner of Luz Street in Havana.

The founders of the Cuban Communist Party are listed as: Julio Antonio Mella, Juan Marinello, Alejandro Barreiro, Carlos Baliño, Alfonso Bernal del Riesgo, Jesús Menéndez, Carlos Rafael Rodríguez, Lázaro Peña, Blas Roca, Rubén Martínez Villena, Anibal Escalante, Emilio Roig, Dr Celestino Hernandez Robau, and Fabio Grobart.

Fabio Grobart (aka Abraham Semjovitch; Alberto Blanco) was born in Białystok, Poland, in 1905 and died in Cuba on 22 October 1994. He was a member of the Soviet-dominated Comintern and was often considered a covert, Moscow-appointed leader of the Communists in the Caribbean area.

Other founders also used pseudonym: Mella used such names as Cauhtémoc Zapata, Kim (El Machete), and Lord McPartland in his writing. The revolutionary known as Blas Roca was born Francisco Calderío.

Alejandro Barreiro is sometimes considered an anarchist, although the Communist Party of Cuba claims him as their own. Barriero is said to have gone mad in 1929, when Mexican police raped his daughters after searching his house. The pseudonyms chosen by some of these "actors" often included historical references. For instance Fabio or, in English, Fabian, referred to Roman consul Quintus Fabius Maximus Verrucosus, known to have used stealthy tactics. Fabian Socialism was an English socialist movement, to which playwright George Bernard Shaw belonged, which advocated stealthy democratic change.

The Cuban Communist Party was later renamed as the People's Socialist Party for electoral reasons. Its policy was dictated from Moscow. At one time, it supported the dictatorship of Gerardo Machado. Later it supported Fulgencio Batista, in whose government Dr. Juan Marinello and Carlos Rafael Rodriguez were ministers without portfolio. Although covert communist support was given to Castro and Che Guevara in the Sierra Maestra, the People's Socialist Party was officially critical of Fidel Castro's rise to power until the summer of 1958.

== Mexico ==
Mella fled Machado's repression in Cuba. He escaped through Cienfuegos, Cuba, reaching Honduras in 1926. He traveled from there through Guatemala and into Mexico, settling in Mexico City. In Mexico, he wrote for a number of newspapers: Cuba Libre, El Libertador, Tren Blindado ("The Armored Train", a Trotskyist symbol), El Machete, and the Boletín del Torcedor (which is published in Havana). Additionally, in 1926, he founded the Asociación de Nuevos Emigrados Revolucionarios Cubanos.

== Death ==
At the time of his murder, he was working as a Cuban Marxist revolutionary in Mexico. He worked with other exiles and supporters to organize the overthrow of the Cuban government of General Gerardo Machado. This cause was an embarrassment to the Cuban Communist Party, which was trying to gain power by establishing a modus vivendi with Machado. Cuban communists were also disturbed by suspecting that Mella had fallen under the influence of former Soviet leader Leon Trotsky. Mella was assassinated on 10 January 1929, while walking home late at night with photographer Tina Modotti.

The Mexican government tried to implicate Modotti in the murder, publishing nude photographs of her by American Edward Weston in an attempt to generate public opinion against her. Muralist Diego Rivera was highly active in defending her and exposing the Mexican government's crude attempt to frame her. Analysts have not reached consensus on the parties responsible for Mella's assassination: the dictatorial Cuban government; the result of Trotsky-Stalin Communist Party feuding; or by a combination of these interests. While two known criminals were charged with his murder, there was speculation that Italian communist assassin Vittorio Vidali had committed the crime.

== Murder of Julio Mella ==
Many political murders, often of communist backsliders and other "heretics" such as Trotskyists, have been attributed to Vidali's "bloody hand". Outside of Cuba, he was believed responsible for Mella's death. Mella and Vidali had both been involved with Modotti in sexual relationships. All three figures are represented in Diego Rivera's mural In the Arsenal.

Because Diego Rivera was close to these three, some observers interpreted his mural as evidence of being involved in the plot against Mella. Rivera was expelled from the Mexican Communist Party in 1929, also suspected of Trotskyite leanings.

The police investigating this crime received conflicting eyewitness reports. In one version, Mella and Modotti were walking alone, in another Vidali was said to be walking with Mella and Modotti. Mella's wounds were made from point blank range, and neither Modotti or Vidali were injured. As Modotti initially gave a false name to the investigators, the police were suspicious of her alibi. She was arrested, but soon released. Officially José Agustín López (said to have no particular political affiliations) was charged with Mella's murder, but two other known killers, José Magriñat and Antonio Sanabría, were also suspected. Magriñat was arrested but soon released. He was killed by Communists in Cuba in 1933.

The official position of the present Cuban government is still that Mella was killed at Gerardo Machado's orders, but it admits that Tina Modotti was a Stalinist operative who operated in a number of countries. Yet there are some even in Cuba who seem to believe that Vidali did it. Adding to the mystery, according to Albers (2002), both Magriñat and Diego Rivera, who had just returned from Cuba, had warned Mella that he was in danger.

== Funeral and symbolism ==
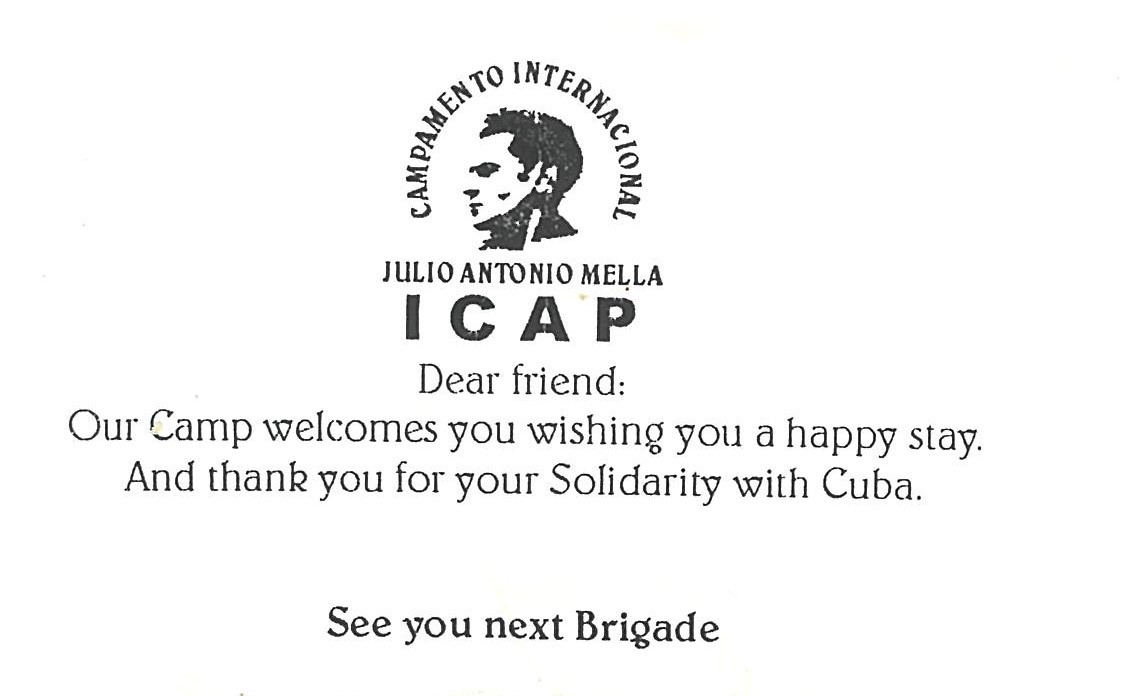
Campamento Internacional Julio Antonio Mella welcome card (2002)

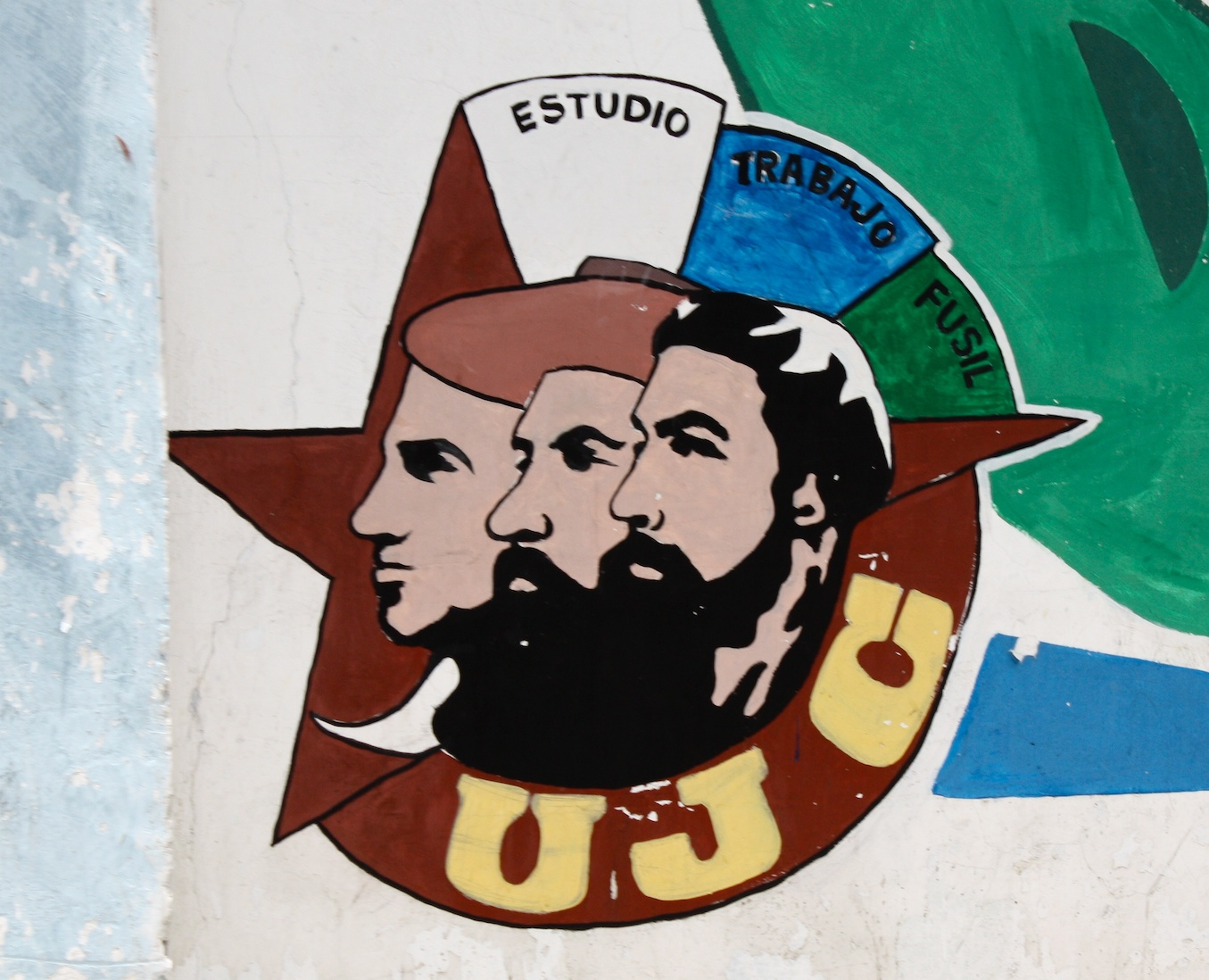
Young Communist League (UJC) logo on a wall in Havana. It shows (from left to right) the stylized faces of Julio Mella, Camilo Cienfuegos, and Che Guevara.

On 29 September 1933 the troops of Fulgencio Batista, less than a month in power, broke up a procession to bury his ashes in Havana. Perhaps six people were shot under confused circumstances. There is a small park on Infanta Street, near the José Raúl Capablanca chess club, that commemorates this event.

Mella's bust (now replaced by a far larger obelisk) stood in a small park on San Lazaro Avenue slightly east and downhill of Havana University and is the object of much Marxist veneration. Before the 1961 Bay of Pigs Invasion, this bust was often blown down at night and could be heard in the silence after the explosion rumbling in a most frightening way as it rolled eastwards. Each time, by next morning it was rapidly restored to its pedestal.

In Caimito, a small town in Artemisa Province, there is a camp called Campamento Internacional Julio Antonio Mella honoring him. The town of Mella, in Santiago de Cuba Province, was named after him.

== See also ==
- History of Cuba
- Communist Party of Cuba
