= Hollis Read =

American missionary and author (1802–1887)

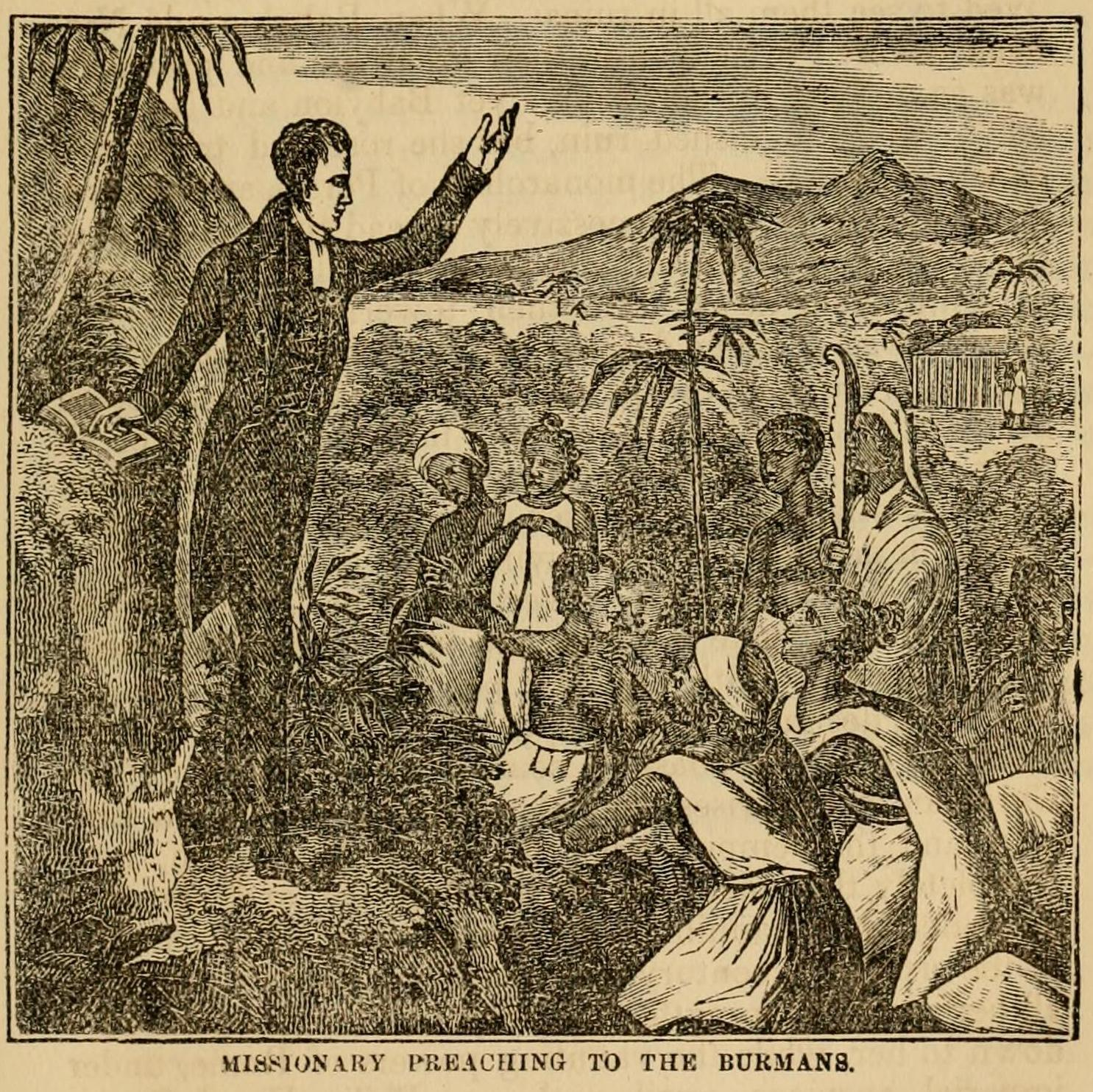
- Engraving from the 1870 edition of Hollis' book The hand of god in history
- Born: August 26, 1802; Newfane, Vermont
- Died: April 7, 1887 (aged 84)
- Occupations: Pastor, missionary and author

Hollis Read (August 26, 1802 – April 7, 1887) was an American missionary, lecturer, pastor, and author. He wrote about religion, India, and Africa as well as about emancipated African Americans after the American Civil War in the United States. He recommended expatriating African Americans to Africa in his influential book The Negro Problem Solved, Or, Africa as She Was, as She Is, and as She Shall Be: Her Curse and Her Cure published in 1864. It recommended sending freed slaves to Africa after the American Civil War.

== Early life ==
He was born in Newfane, Vermont and studied at Williams College and Princeton Seminary.

== Career ==
In 1833 he led a mission to Ahmednagar, India. He wrote an account of the trip:

I had been there but a few hours when the Chief Magistrate issued an order forbidding any person to take a book from me under penalty of a rupee and a quarter. Consequently, no applications were made during the first day; but about eleven o'clock at night, when all was still, a Brahman came to me secretly and begged a book. I gave him one. He was followed by others. They took whatever I gave them without uttering a word and went away. The next day the threat was unheeded, and the people received books and tracts both in the streets and at my lodgings, without the least fear or hesitation. The people said their rulers had no right to forbid their receiving religious books.

In 1838, he funded the pulpit for the First Presbyterian Church of Long Island. His sermon "The religion of common life" was published in 1856.

== Selected works ==
- Journal of a passage to India, 1830. OCLC 30756687.
- The Christian Brahmun. New York; Boston: Leavitt, Lord & Co.; Crocker & Brewster. 1836. OCLC 950909356. OL 7097136M.
- The hand of God in history. Vol. 1 (1849 ed.). Hartford: H. Huntington. 1849 [1848]. OCLC 715413. OL 6343017M.
- The hand of God in history. Vol. 2 (1859 ed.). Hartford: H.E. Robins and Co. 1859 [1856]. OCLC 1157156096. OL 7072406M.
- The Negro problem solved: or, Africa as she was, as she is, and as she shall be; her curse and her cure. New York: A. A. Constantine. 1864. OCLC 1082457424. OL 33194187M.
- The God of this world; the footprints of Satan: or, The devil in history (The counterpart of "God in history"). Toronto: Maclear & Co. 1875. OCLC 38069623. OL 23438717M.
