= The Study of the Negro Problems =

1898 essay written by W. E. B. Du Bois

"The Study of the Negro Problems", from The Annals of the American Academy of Political and Social Science (January 1898), is an essay written by professor, sociologist, historian and activist W. E. B. Du Bois. It both challenges the question he poses in his The Souls of Black Folk (1903) of “How does it feel to be a problem?” and is reminiscent of the popular mindset of white people toward people of color at the time.

As a recurring theme amid Du Bois' works, the Negro as a problem to those representing the majority population was a concept into which Du Bois sought to delve further as he explored what it meant to be a minority – and an educated one – among those who still viewed minorities as a nuisance to their culture or else a burden and creatures not belonging as one of their own.

An introduction to another one of his familiar concepts - that of the black double-consciousness - the question of how it feels to be a problem is intended for Negro men and women to keep in the back of their minds. As people of conflicting identities of both Negro and American in a white American world, they should be constantly mindful of this while they discern how they fit in as citizens moving through a racially disconnected New World based on the outward perceptions of them from the white majority race.

Before we can begin to study the Negro intelligently, we must realize definitely that not is he affected by all the varying social forces that act on any nation at his stage of advancement, but that in addition to these there is reacting upon him the mighty power of a peculiar and unusual social environment which affects to some extent every other social force. In the second place we should seek to know and measure carefully all the forces and conditions that go to make up these different problems, to trace the historical development of these conditions, and discover as far as possible the probable trend of further development. Without doubt this would be difficult work, and it can with much truth be objected that we cannot ascertain, by the methods of sociological research known to us, all such facts thoroughly and accurately.

— Du Bois,

The focus of The Study of the Negro Problems is on the means of law enforcement used to separate blacks from their white counterparts and how social forces, as responses to the African slaves’ introduction into America, forced these laws onto the slaves and their ancestors.

== Main Arguments (Overview) ==
In The Study of Negro Problems, Du Bois takes the main stance that African Americans should not hunt for some one hulking social plight; instead, the social plight of the contemporary African American lied in multiple issues that required historical, scientific, and sociological study rather than “hasty conjecture”. In this text, he also provides his own definition of a social problem, which is “ the failure of an organized group to realize its ideals due to an inability to adapt to its conditions.” He emphasizes that the "Negro is not a problem," but rather a group of people affected by social problems. He connects the social problems affecting African Americans to two distinct factors. The first is White Racial Prejudice, the widespread conviction that Black people should not be admitted into the nation's group life, regardless of their individual condition. The second is Cultural Backwardness, The internal challenges resulting from historical oppression, including economic disadvantage, lack of education, and social inefficiency.

=== Clashing Ideals ===
Du Bois' ideas concerning improving the condition of African-American were met with opposing ideas, as is the case of all polarizing subject matter. Perhaps the most notable opposition Du Bois faced in terms of the strategic betterment of African-American life in the United States was that of Booker T. Washington. Du Bois critiques the views of Washington, who advocated for gradual acceptance and self-improvement as a means of achieving equality.Du Bois, in The Study of Negro Problems, refutes by stating that racial discrimination against African-Americans puts them at such a disadvantage that mere hard work and determination on their part will not be enough to lift them out of their social plight.

== Continuity ==
In The Study of Negro Problems, Du Bois addresses many of the same issues as he does in The Philadelphia Negro, a book on the sociological study of African-Americans in Philadelphia, Pennsylvania conducted by Du Bois.The Study of Negro Problems challenged the idea that African-Americans could be identified and rectified with focused, methodical, and scientific study. The Philadelphia Negro, written one year later in 1898, took these ideas and applied them, leading to what is considered "the first sociological case study of a black community in the United States."

=== "Negro Problems" vs. "The Negro Problem" ===
In The Study of Negro Problems, Du Bois defines his goals for the essay in regards to negro problems, the first two being addressed as follows: "first, as to the historical development of these problems; then as to the necessity for their careful systematic study at the present time." The use of "Negro Problems" is to delineate the often oversimplified African-American plight, expressing that, theoretically, there in not one problem but rather a combination of many issues. The Philadelphia Negro, being a practical application of previously mentioned theory, introduces "The Negro Problem". The Negro Problem, in summary, refers to the social prejudice that limits African-Americans' propensity for prosperity.

== Du Bois and The Annals of the American Academy of Political and Social Science ==
The Annals of the American Academy of Political and Social Science, are a collection of peer-reviewed academic publications covering specialized fields like social science, medicine, and neurosciences. "The Study of Negro Problems" was published in Volume 11.

The 568th volume of The Annals was published in March 2000. It was edited by special editors Elijah Anderson and Tukufu Zuberi. It serves as a 100-year retrospective on W.E.B. Du Bois' 1898 prospectus, "The Study of the Negro Problems". It utilizes a "Du Boisian perspective" to analyze contemporary racial issues, emphasizing that his scientific approach to studying social problems stemming from systemic exclusion remains critical for addressing modern disparities.
