= John Belton O'Neall =

American judge

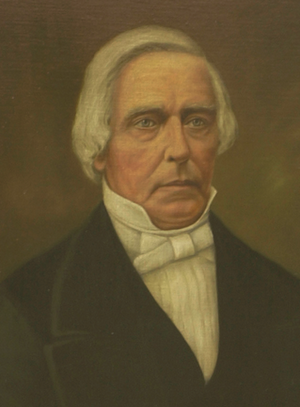

Chief Justice of South Carolina
- In office 1859–1863
- Succeeded by: Benjamin Faneuil Dunkin

Personal details
- Born: April 10, 1793 near Bobo's Mills, South Carolina
- Died: December 27, 1863 (aged 70)
- Spouse: Helen Pope
- Education: South Carolina College (1812; M.A. 1816)

John Belton O'Neall (1793–1863) was an American judge who served on the precursor to the South Carolina Supreme Court. He is remembered for writing the digest The Negro Law of South Carolina.

== Early life and education ==
O'Neall graduated from South Carolina College (now the University of South Carolina) in December 1812 and began teaching at Newberry Academy.

== Legal career ==
Admitted to the bar in South Carolina in May 1814, he began his legal practice, and soon his political career. He was elected to the South Carolina House of Representatives in 1816 from the Newberry, South Carolina area. He was elected again in 1822, and in 1824, he served as the Speaker of the South Carolina House of Representatives. He was first elected as a trial judge in 1828, and in 1830 was elected a judge on the South Carolina Court of Appeals. Following reforms to South Carolina's judicial branch, he was elected to serve as Chief Justice and President of the South Carolina Court of Appeals, the highest court in the state. In 1848 O'Neall (who was reported by a personal acquaintance to have owned "about 150" slaves and to have been "a most humane master") wrote a digest of the negro law of South Carolina, which he read to the State Agricultural Society. The Society directed him to submit the document to the governor, with a request that he would lay it before the legislature, at its approaching session in November 1848. His book was extremely controversial due to what was perceived by many slaveholding South Carolinians of the time to be its abolitionist-influenced advocacy of sharply reducing the number of crimes for which slaves could be put to death under South Carolina laws. The Columbia, S.C. "Telegraph" newspaper reported that the Judiciary Committee of the South Carolina state legislature declared "The Negro Law in South Carolina" to be "an objectionable book"; and the Telegraph's editors appear to have not only denounced the book for promoting "amalgamation" of the races but also to have joined calls for the book to be withdrawn from circulation.

== Death ==
O'Neall died on December 27, 1863.

== See also ==
- The Negro Law of South Carolina
