= Outline of Cuba =

Island country in the Caribbean

The Flag of Cuba

The Coat of arms of Cuba

The location of Cuba

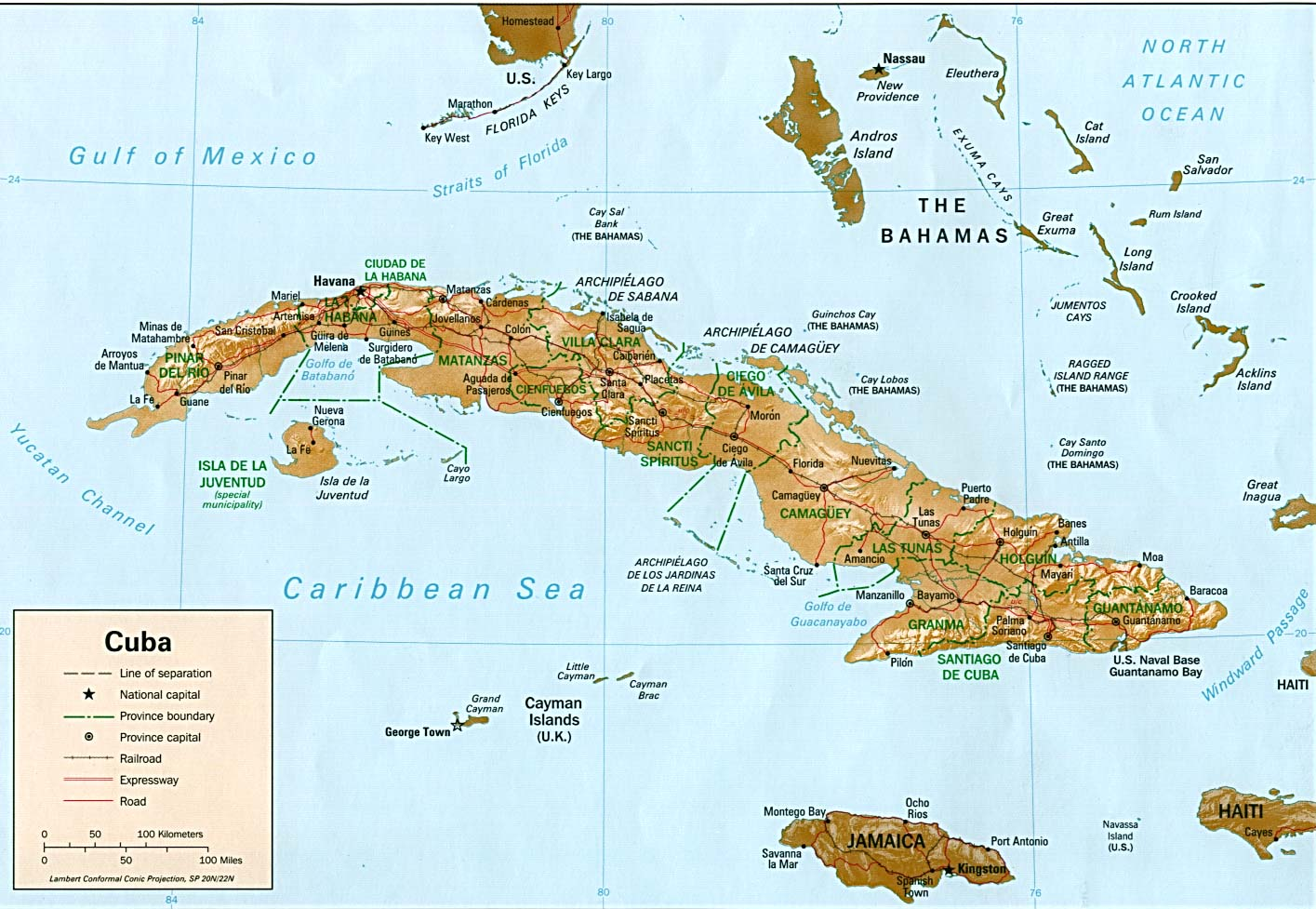
An enlargeable relief map of Cuba

The following outline is provided as an overview of and topical guide to Cuba:

Cuba – island country in the Caribbean. It consists of the main island of Cuba, the Isla de la Juventud, and several archipelagos. Havana is the largest city in Cuba and the country's capital. Santiago de Cuba is the second largest city. Cuba is home to over 11 million people and is the most populous island nation in the Caribbean. Its people, culture, and customs draw from diverse sources, such as the aboriginal Taíno and Ciboney peoples, the period of Spanish colonialism, the introduction of African slaves and its proximity to the United States.

== General reference ==
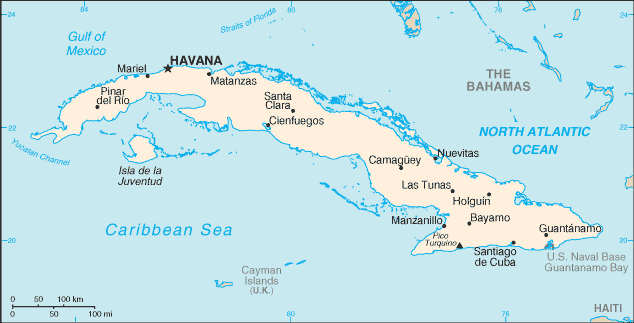
An enlargeable basic map of Cuba

- Pronounced: /ˈkjuːbə/ KEW-bə, Spanish: [ˈkuβa]
- Common English country name: Cuba
- Official English country name: The Republic of Cuba
- Common endonym(s):
- Official endonym(s): República de Cuba
- Adjectival(s): Cuban
- Demonym(s):`cubano/cubana
- Etymology: Name of Cuba
- International rankings of Cuba
- ISO country codes: CU, CUB, 192
- ISO region codes: See ISO 3166-2:CU
- Internet country code top-level domain: .cu

== Geography of Cuba ==
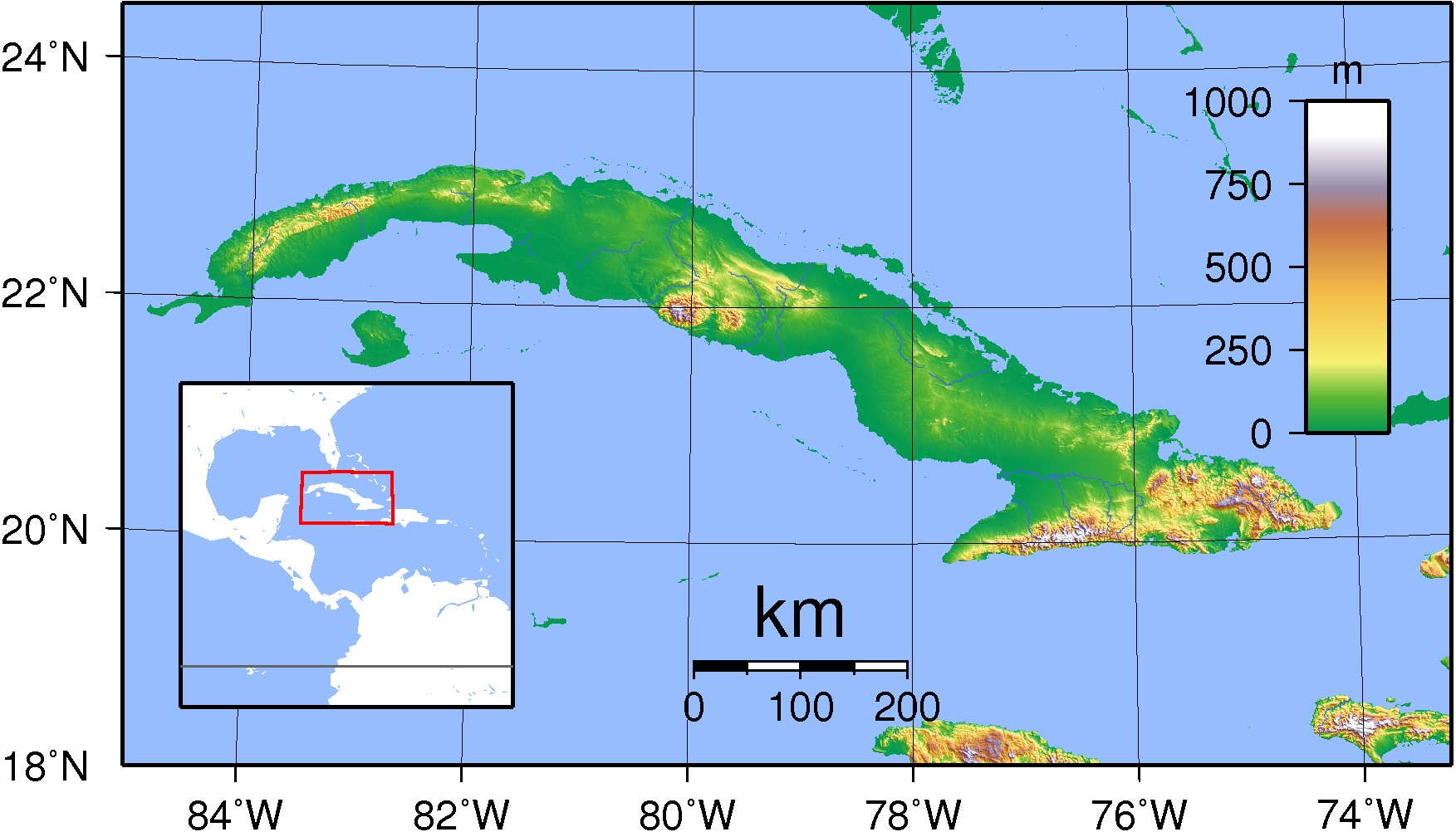
An enlargeable topographic map of Cuba

Geography of Cuba

- Cuba is an island country
- Cuba is located in the following regions:
  - Northern Hemisphere and Western Hemisphere
    - North America (though not on the mainland)
  - Atlantic Ocean
    - North Atlantic
      - Caribbean
        - Antilles
          - Greater Antilles
  - Time zone: UTC-05, summer UTC-04
  - Extreme points of Cuba
    - High: Pico Turquino 1,974 m (6,476 ft)
    - Low: Caribbean Sea 0 m
  - Coastline: 3,735 km
- Population: 11,268,000 - 85th most populous country
- Area: 110,861 km^{2}
- Atlas of Cuba

=== Environment of Cuba ===
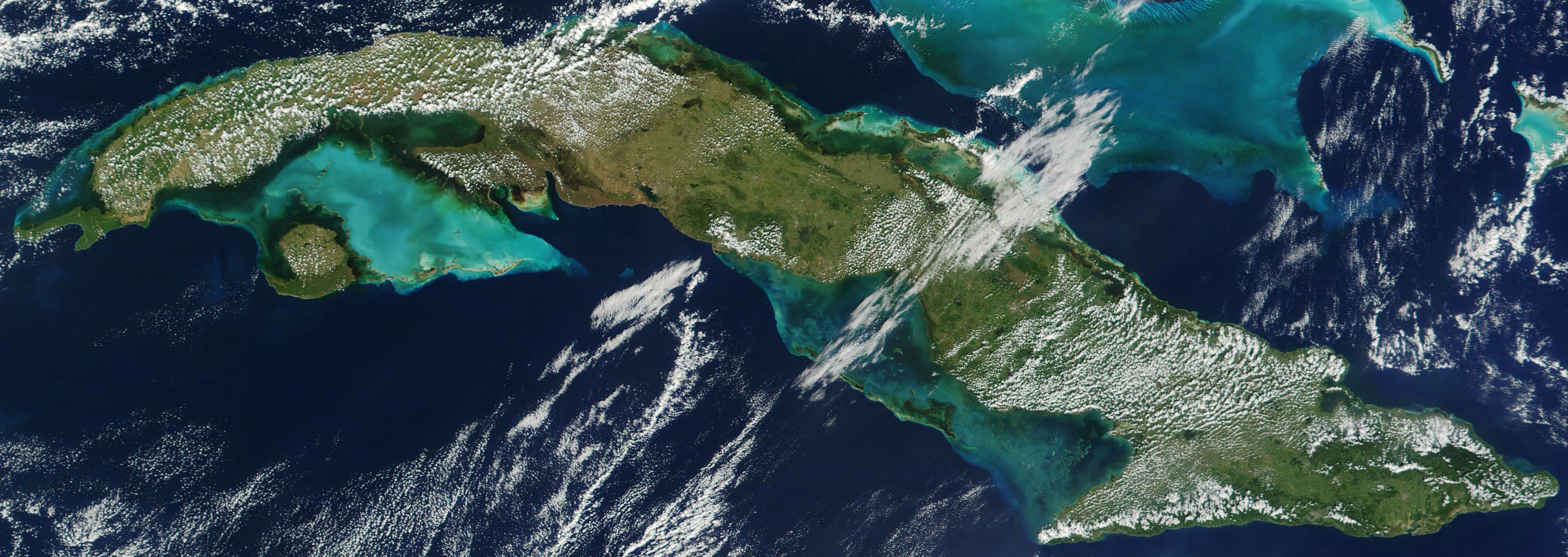
An enlargeable satellite image of Cuba

- Ecoregions
- Biosphere reserves
- Earthquakes in Cuba
- Wildlife of Cuba
  - Flora
  - Fauna of Cuba
    - Birds
    - Mammals
    - Amphibians and reptiles

==== Natural geographic features ====
- Islands
- Mountains
- Bodies of water
  - Gulfs and bays
    - Bay of Cárdenas
    - Bay of Havana
    - Bay of Matanzas
    - Bay of Pigs
    - Bay of Santa Clara
    - Ensenada de la Broa
    - Guantánamo Bay, Cuba
    - Gulf of Batabanó
    - Gulf of Cazones
    - Gulf of Guacanayabo
  - Rivers
- List of World Heritage Sites

=== Administrative divisions of Cuba ===
==== Ecoregions of Cuba ====
List of ecoregions in Cuba

===== Provinces of Cuba =====

Province	Capital
Artemisa	Artemisa
Camagüey	Camagüey
Ciego de Ávila	Ciego de Ávila
Cienfuegos	Cienfuegos
Granma	Bayamo
Guantánamo	Guantánamo
Holguín	Holguín
La Habana	Havana
Las Tunas	Las Tunas
Matanzas	Matanzas
Mayabeque	San José de las Lajas
Pinar del Río	Pinar del Río
Sancti Spíritus	Sancti Spíritus
Santiago de Cuba	Santiago de Cuba
Villa Clara	Santa Clara
Isla de la Juventud	Nueva Gerona

===== Municipalities of Cuba =====

- Capital of Cuba: Havana
- Cities of Cuba

=== Demography of Cuba ===
Demographics of Cuba

== History of Cuba ==
=== By period ===
- Chronology of Colonial Cuba – 1512–1898
- Liberation from Spain
  - Ten Years' War – 1868–1878
  - Little War (Cuba) – Aug.1879–Sept. 1880
  - Cuban War of Independence – 1895–1898
  - Sinking of USS Maine – February 1898
  - Spanish–American War – Apr. 1898–Aug. 1898
- First Occupation of Cuba – 1898–1902
- Republic of Cuba (1902–1959)
  - Cuban–American Treaty of Relations (1903)
  - Second Occupation of Cuba, by the United States – 1906–1909
  - Negro Rebellion – 1912
  - Sugar Intervention – 1917–1922
  - Protest of the Thirteen – March 1923
  - creation of the Cuban Communist Party – 1925
  - Sergeants' Revolt – September 1933
  - One Hundred Days Government – Sept. 1933–Jan. 1934
  - Cuban–American Treaty of Relations (1934) – June 1934
- Cuban Revolution – 1953–1959
  - Timeline of the Cuban Revolution
  - Fidel Castro in the Cuban Revolution
  - Moncada Barracks – attack on 26 July 1953
  - 26th of July Movement – 1955–1962
  - Granma (yacht) – November 1956
- Cuba – Soviet relations
- Republic of Cuba – 1959–
  - Escambray rebellion – 1959–1965
  - Bay of Pigs Invasion – April 1961
  - Cuban Missile Crisis – October 1962
  - Cuban intervention in Angola – 1975–1991)
  - Special Period in Time of Peace – economic crisis, 1991–2000
    - August 1994 protest in Cuba
  - Cuban thaw – 2014–

=== By region ===
- History of Cuba's provinces
  - History of Granma Province
  - History of Guantánamo Province
  - History of Havana
  - History of Holguín Province
  - History of Pinar del Río Province
  - History of Sancti Spíritus Province
  - History of Santiago de Cuba Province
  - History of Villa Clara Province

=== By subject ===
- Anarchism in Cuba
- Economic history of Cuba
  - Dollar store
  - Cuban sugar economy
- Military history of Cuba
- History of Cuban Nationality

== Government and politics of Cuba ==
Politics of Cuba

- Form of government: socialist state, with national parliament
- Capital of Cuba: Havana
- Corruption in Cuba
- Cuban exile
- Elections in Cuba
- Political movements in Cuba
  - Cuban dissident movement
  - Liberalism in Cuba
- Political parties in Cuba
  - Governing political party: Communist Party of Cuba

=== Branches of the government of Cuba ===
Government of Cuba

==== Executive branch of the government of Cuba ====
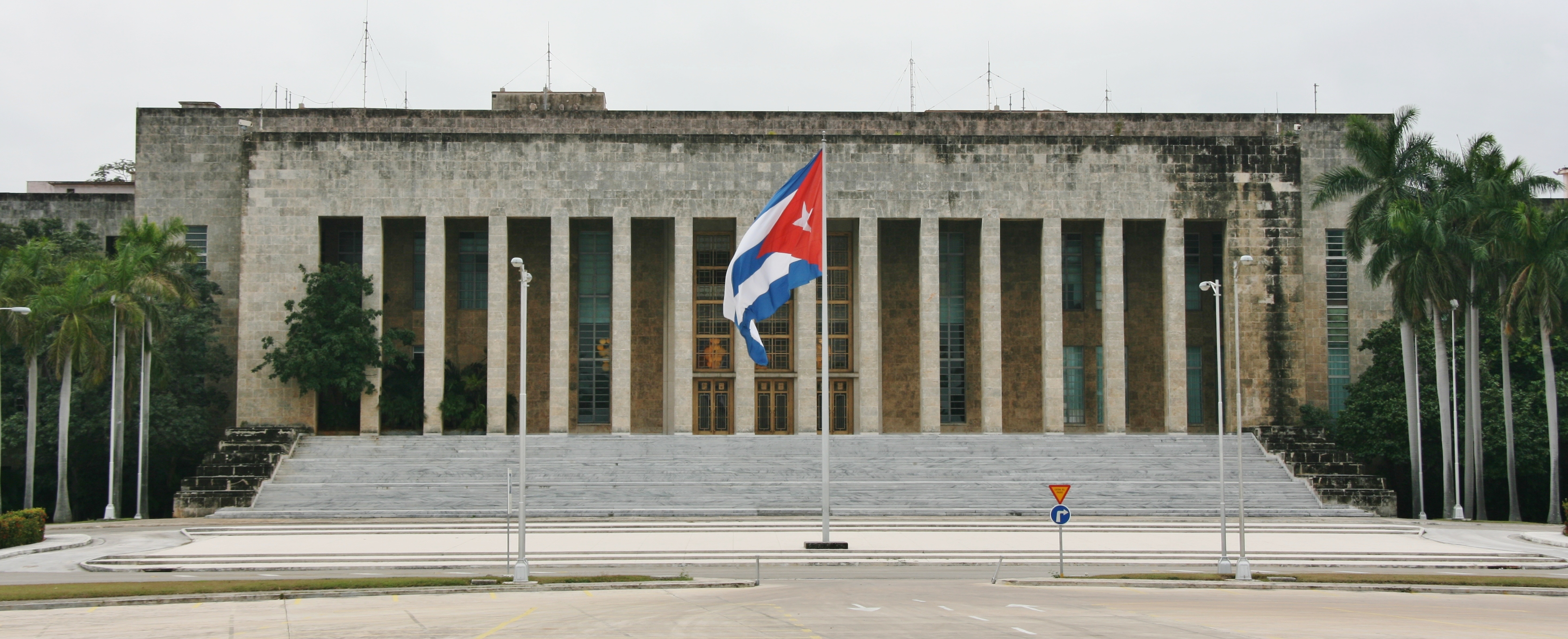

- First Secretary of the Communist Party of Cuba
- Head of state: President of Cuba, Miguel Díaz-Canel
- Head of government: Prime Minister of Cuba, Manuel Marrero Cruz
- Council of Ministers (Cuba)

==== Legislative branch of the government of Cuba ====
- National Assembly of People's Power

==== Judicial branch of the government of Cuba ====
Cuban legal system

- Supreme Court of Cuba
- Legal profession in Cuba

=== Foreign relations of Cuba ===
- International Committee for Democracy in Cuba
- Diplomatic missions (embassies)
  - Diplomatic missions in Cuba
  - Diplomatic missions of Cuba
- Foreign relations, by country
  - Cuba–Russia relations
  - People's Republic of China – Cuba relations
  - United States-Cuba relations
    - CIA activities in Cuba
    - Cuba – United States Maritime Boundary Agreement
    - Cuban migration to Miami
    - United States citizens granted political asylum in Cuba
    - United States embargo against Cuba
- Cuban medical internationalism

==== International organization membership ====
The Republic of Cuba is a member of:

- African, Caribbean, and Pacific Group of States (ACP)
- Agency for the Prohibition of Nuclear Weapons in Latin America and the Caribbean (OPANAL)
- Food and Agriculture Organization (FAO)
- Group of 77 (G77)
- International Atomic Energy Agency (IAEA)
- International Chamber of Commerce (ICC)
- International Civil Aviation Organization (ICAO)
- International Criminal Police Organization (Interpol)
- International Federation of Red Cross and Red Crescent Societies (IFRCS)
- International Fund for Agricultural Development (IFAD)
- International Hydrographic Organization (IHO)
- International Labour Organization (ILO)
- International Maritime Organization (IMO)
- International Mobile Satellite Organization (IMSO)
- International Olympic Committee (IOC)
- International Organization for Migration (IOM) (observer)
- International Organization for Standardization (ISO)
- International Red Cross and Red Crescent Movement (ICRM)
- International Telecommunication Union (ITU)
- International Telecommunications Satellite Organization (ITSO)
- Inter-Parliamentary Union (IPU)
- Latin American Economic System (LAES)
- Latin American Integration Association (LAIA)
- Nonaligned Movement (NAM)
- Organisation for the Prohibition of Chemical Weapons (OPCW)
- Organization of American States (OAS) (sanctioned since 1962)
- Permanent Court of Arbitration (PCA)
- Unión Latina
- United Nations (UN)
- United Nations Conference on Trade and Development (UNCTAD)
- United Nations Educational, Scientific, and Cultural Organization (UNESCO)
- United Nations Industrial Development Organization (UNIDO)
- United Nations Institute for Training and Research (UNITAR)
- Universal Postal Union (UPU)
- World Confederation of Labour (WCL)
- World Customs Organization (WCO)
- World Federation of Trade Unions (WFTU)
- World Health Organization (WHO)
- World Intellectual Property Organization (WIPO)
- World Meteorological Organization (WMO)
- World Tourism Organization (UNWTO)
- World Trade Organization (WTO)

=== Law and order in Cuba ===
- Capital punishment in Cuba
- Constitution of Cuba
- Crime in Cuba
- Human rights in Cuba
  - Censorship in Cuba
  - LGBT rights in Cuba
    - Recognition of same-sex unions in Cuba
  - Freedom of religion in Cuba
- Law enforcement in Cuba

=== Military of Cuba ===
Military of Cuba

- Command
  - Commander-in-chief:
    - Ministry of Defence of Cuba
- Forces
  - Army of Cuba
  - Navy of Cuba
  - Air Force of Cuba
  - Special forces of Cuba
- Military history of Cuba
- Military ranks of Cuba

=== Local government in Cuba ===
Local government in Cuba

== Culture of Cuba ==
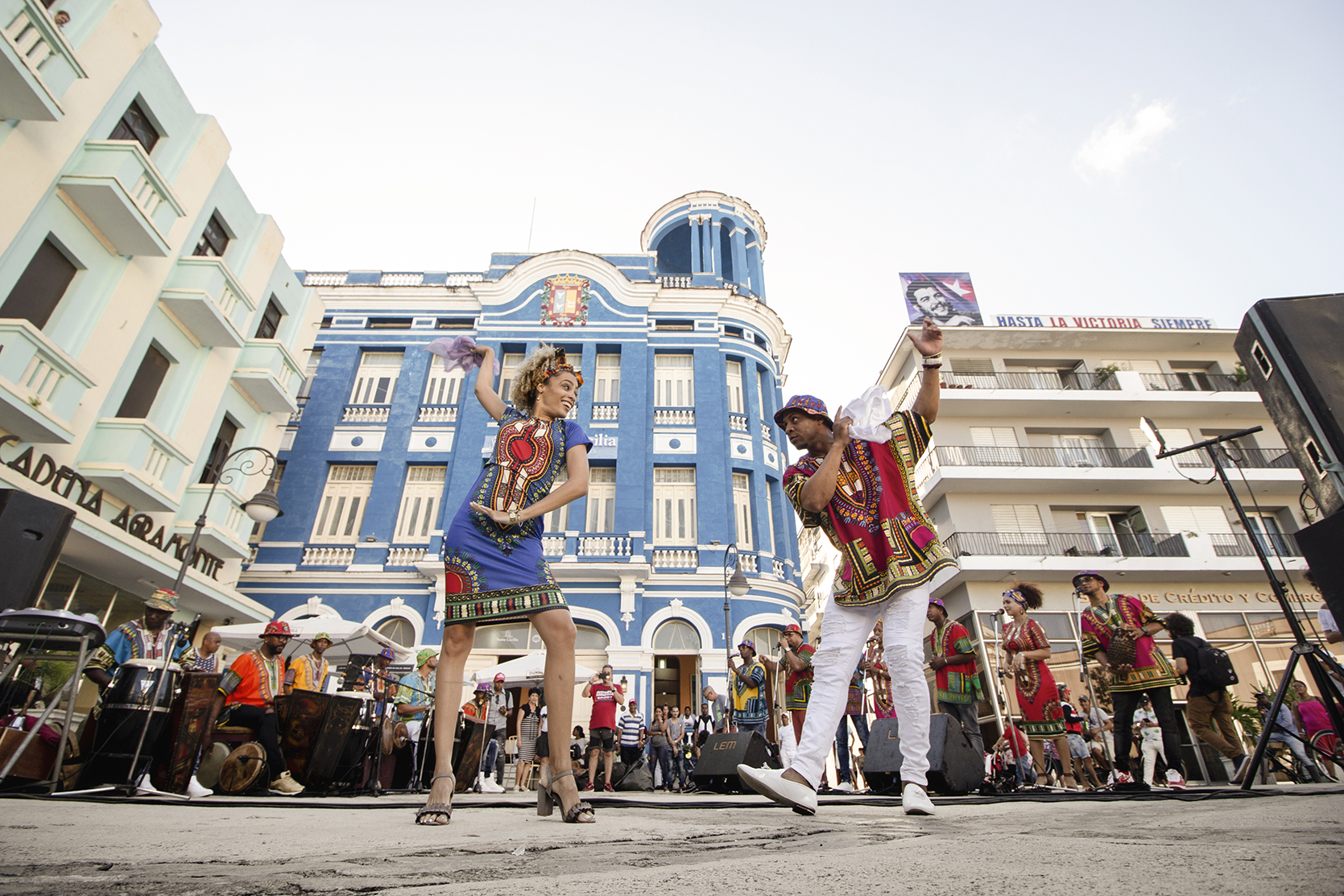
Rumba dancers performing in Camagüey

Vibrant street life in Havana

Portrait style representation

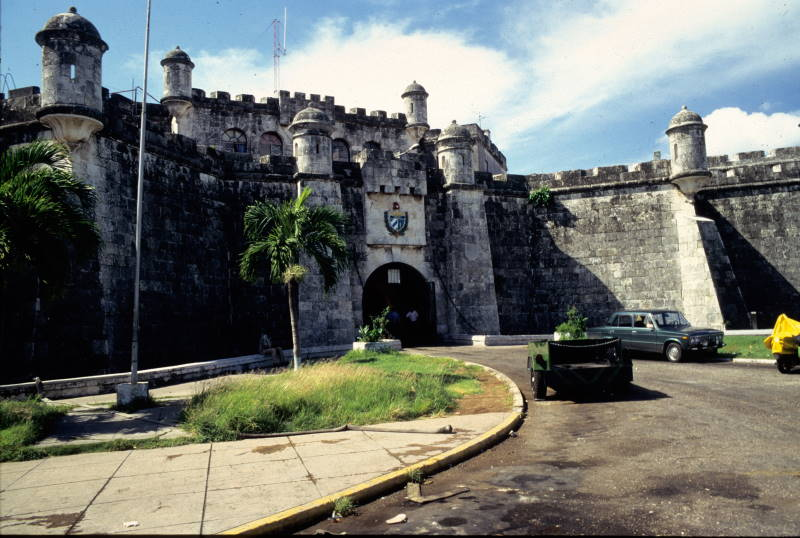
The 18th-century entrance of the Castillo del Príncipe in Havana

- Architecture of Cuba
  - Forts in Cuba
    - Castillo de Jagua
    - Castillo de San Pedro
    - Castillo de la Real Fuerza
    - La Cabaña
    - Morro Castle
    - San Salvador de la Punta Fortress
- Cuisine of Cuba
  - Cuba Libre
  - Cuban sandwich
- Languages of Cuba
- Media in Cuba
- Museums in Cuba
- National symbols of Cuba
  - Coat of arms of Cuba
  - Flag of Cuba
  - National anthem of Cuba
- People of Cuba
  - Ethnic minorities in Cuba
    - Chinese Cubans
    - Afro-Cubans
    - Jewbans
  - Women in Cuba
- Prostitution in Cuba
- Public holidays in Cuba
- Racism in Cuba
- Scouting and Guiding in Cuba
- World Heritage Sites in Cuba

=== Art in Cuba ===
- Art in Cuba
  - List of Cuban artists
- Cinema of Cuba
  - List of Cuban films
- Dance in Cuba
  - Cuban National Ballet
- Literature of Cuba
  - List of Cuban writers
- Music of Cuba
  - Cuban folk music
  - Cuban jazz
  - Cuban rock
  - Early Cuban bands
  - National Symphony Orchestra of Cuba
- Television in Cuba
- Theatre in Cuba
  - Cuban musical theatre
  - National Theater of Cuba

=== Religion in Cuba ===
Religion in Cuba

- Christianity in Cuba
  - Episcopal Church of Cuba
  - Protestantism in Cuba
  - Roman Catholicism in Cuba
- Hinduism in Cuba
- Islam in Cuba
- Judaism in Cuba

=== Sports in Cuba ===
Sport in Cuba

==== In general ====
- Cuba at the Olympics
  - Cuban Olympic Committee
  - List of Olympic medalists for Cuba
- Cuban athletes
- Cuban records in athletics
- Cuba at the Pan American Games

==== By sport ====
- Baseball in Cuba
  - Cuban national baseball system
- Basketball in Cuba
  - Cuba national basketball team
  - Cuba women's national basketball team
- Cricket in Cuba
  - Cuba national cricket team
- Football in Cuba
  - Asociación de Fútbol de Cuba
    - Cuba national football team
  - Handball in Cuba
    - Cuba men's national handball team
  - Rugby in Cuba
    - Rugby union in Cuba
  - Volleyball in Cuba
    - Cuba men's national volleyball team
    - Cuba women's national volleyball team

== Economy and infrastructure of Cuba ==
Economy of Cuba

- Economic rank, by nominal GDP (2007): 68th (sixty-eighth)
- Agriculture in Cuba
  - Agricultural cooperatives
    - CPA (Cooperativa de Producción Agropecuaria)
    - UBPC - 'Unidad Básica de Producción Cooperativa', or Basic Unit of Cooperative Production
- Banking in Cuba
  - Central Bank of Cuba
  - List of banks in Cuba
- Companies of Cuba
- Currency of Cuba: Convertible Peso / Peso
  - ISO 4217: CUP
- Economic history of Cuba
- Energy in Cuba
  - Energy policy of Cuba
  - Oil industry in Cuba
- Mining in Cuba
  - Oil reserves in Cuba
- Rationing in Cuba
- Cuba Stock Exchange
- Tourism in Cuba
- Water supply and sanitation in Cuba
  - Water privatization in Cuba

=== Communications in Cuba ===
Communications in Cuba

- Internet in Cuba
- Cuba Emergency Response System
- Internet in Cuba
- Newspapers in Cuba
- Telephone numbers in Cuba
- Television in Cuba

=== Transportation in Cuba ===
Transportation in Cuba

- Airports in Cuba
- Rail transport in Cuba
  - Ferrocarriles de Cuba
- Road transport in Cuba
  - Roads in Cuba
    - Carretera Central
  - Vehicle registration plates of Cuba

== Education in Cuba ==
- Universities in Cuba

== Health in Cuba ==
- Health care in Cuba
  - Hospitals in Cuba

== See also ==
Cuba

- List of international rankings
- Member state of the United Nations
- Outline of geography
- Outline of North America
