= Human trafficking in Cuba =

In 2010, Cuba was principally a source country for children subjected to trafficking in persons, specifically commercial sexual exploitation within the country. The scope of trafficking within Cuba was difficult to gauge due to the closed nature of the government and sparse non-governmental or independent reporting. Throughout Cuban history the main types of human trafficking are through sexual and domestic exploitation, as well as forced labor. Women and girls are typically the major victims of these infractions since they are more likely to experience gender inequality, discrimination, and consequences on their physical and emotional well-being.

In 2010 the Government of Cuba did not fully comply with the minimum standards for the elimination of trafficking and did not make significant efforts to do so. In a positive step, the Government of Cuba shared information about human trafficking and its efforts to address the issue. However, the government did not prohibit all forms of trafficking during the reporting period, nor did it provide specific evidence that it prosecuted and punished trafficking offenders, protected victims of all forms of trafficking, or implemented victim protection policies or programs to prevent human trafficking.

Cuba ratified the 2000 UN TIP Protocol in June 2013.

The U.S. State Department's Office to Monitor and Combat Trafficking in Persons placed the country in "Tier 2 Watchlist" in 2017 and 2018.

In 2019, Cuba was downgraded to Tier 3 since it did not comply with the minimum standards and made no significant efforts to do so, and remained in Tier 3 in 2020. In 2023 the country remained as a Tier 3 country, with the U.S. report noting that Cuba was one of eleven countries which were seen as having a documented government policy or pattern of human trafficking.

In 2023, the Organised Crime Index gave Cuba a score of 5.5 out of 10 for human trafficking, noting that the government had made efforts to prevent this crime.

== Government of Cuba ==
The Government of Cuba did not report discernible progress on prosecuting trafficking offenders during 2009. Cuba appears to prohibit most forms of trafficking activity through various provisions of its penal code, but the usage of these provisions could not be verified. Title III, Section 1, Article 310 provides that using children under 16 in prostitution, corruption, pornographic acts, or other illegal conduct may be punishable by from seven to 30 years’ imprisonment or death. Prostitution of children over the age of 16 is legal. Article 316, on the selling of children, bans internal and transnational trafficking in children under the age of 16 for forced labor, prostitution, trade in organs, and pornography, and prescribes penalties of between four and 20 years’ imprisonment. Articles 302 and 87 prohibit inducing an adult into prostitution, and prescribe penalties of up to 20 years’ imprisonment. All these penalties are sufficiently stringent, and commensurate with those prescribed for other serious crimes, such as rape. The government did not share official data relating to Cuban investigations, prosecutions, and convictions of trafficking offenders in 2009 or any other year. Reports continued of individual police officers profiting from the commercial sex trade, though the practice is officially discouraged. No investigations or prosecutions of public officials have been confirmed. The government did not report any anti-trafficking training provided to officials. However, UNICEF reported that police and workers in the tourist industry received this kind of training. The government also participated in UNICEF sponsored regional programs aimed at combating trafficking.

== Protection ==
The government did not provide substantive evidence of protection of trafficking victims during 2009. The government restricted the ability of international and domestic NGOs to operate in Cuba. In partnership with one NGO and another government, Cuba continued to fund the operation of two centers treating sexually abused children, but the government did not provide information about who received treatment in these centers. The government also provided funding for women's shelters where victims could access care, though the government did not provide information about who received treatment at the shelters. According to UNICEF, both the centers for children and the women's shelters are used by trafficking victims, and the staff is trained specifically on how to identify and treat trafficking victims. The government did not report that police and other officials employed procedures to proactively identify trafficking victims, such as people in prostitution, and guide them to services, but a UNICEF representative indicated that the police receive specific training on identifying trafficking victims and information about how to refer them to available services. The government provided no evidence that it encouraged trafficking victims to assist in the investigation and prosecution of trafficking offenders.

== Prevention ==
To date the government has made limited efforts in anti-trafficking prevention efforts. The government generally did not discuss publicly human trafficking issues. The government did not implement any known public awareness campaigns to prevent forced labor or forced prostitution. The government did not report the existence of an anti-trafficking task force, monitoring mechanism, or action plan. However, the National Action Plan for Children and Adolescents sets specific goals and provides implementation guidance on protecting the rights of children and preventing child labor, prostitution, and trafficking. During 2009, the official press produced several articles on Cuban citizens who reportedly were subjected to forced labor and forced prostitution in Mexico while awaiting passage to the United States. By 2019, the government made no known efforts to reduce the demand for commercial sex. The government denied it had a child sex tourism problem but it banned children under 16 from nightclubs, and according to Cuban government documents, the government provided training to hotel workers and others in the tourism industry on how to identify and report potential sex tourists.

In February 2017, the government published the national anti-trafficking plan for 2017-2020.

The government and the Federation of Cuban Women (FMC) continued to operate the implemented 24-hour telephone help line from 2018. To which none of the reported 19,192 calls were related to trafficking in persons.

== Conquest and Colony Stage of Human Trafficking in Cuba ==
In Cuba in 1847, indentured Chinese laborers began arriving in Cuba. Because of the 1882 Chinese Exclusion Act put into place in the United States, and an additional 5,000 Chinese emigrated from the U.S. in order to avoid it. These were mostly single men, who made a very difficult journey to Cuba in order to find work in the agriculture sector. They stayed in the countryside for eight years and then returned to Havana and formed a Chinese community. In 1872, the estimation is that there were 58,000 men and 32 women of Chinese descent in Cuba. This migration of Chinese people involved slavery-like conditions, particularly for women. “One such advertisement indicated the sale of a ‘Chinese woman of twenty one years’ and another announced the sale of ‘a Chinese girl.’” A Havana based newspaper also included an advertisement which read: “For sale: A Chinese girl with two daughters, one of 12–13 years [of age] and the other of 5–6, useful for whatever you may desire. Also one mule.” This trafficking of Chinese girls was apparent in many periods of Cuban history but was not found or recorded in official records.

== Postwar Period and Republic Stage of Human Trafficking in Cuba ==
Following Spanish withdrawal from Cuba in 1898, Cuba formally became an independent republic in 1902. In this stage of time in Cuban history, in an attempt to exploit them sexually, organized crime networks in this period brought foreign women to Cuba. Prostitutes were exploited by both police as well as pimps who were often also involved in sale of illicit drugs, burglaries, and petty thefts.

== Revolutionary stage of Human Trafficking in Cuba ==
January 1, 1959 marks the day that the Cuban Revolution was successful. This is when the country then began to look at social, economic, and cultural problems which threatened the freedom of their nation and tried to improve them. After the revolution, there was a movement to shift away from sexually exploiting women through prostitution as the society had in the past.

Prostitution and pimping in this time period became more publicly talked about, and the general worry regarding it caused a need for it to be addressed. They wanted to eliminate prostitution and the criminal activities that appeared to follow it. In Decree Law 175 of June 1997, attempts at regulating prostitution and pimping were put into place.

They attempted to close brothels, and provide opportunities to this woman for child care, jobs, and healthcare. Despite this, women continued to participate in prostitution with the aim of bettering their lives financially. Threats, violence from pimps, and connection to organized crime contributed to these women being in a category which left them more vulnerable to trafficking and sexual exploitation. Their socioeconomic situations, the fact that they believed the activity came with little risk, and the hidden nature of the crime that was actually involved, left them vulnerable. They believed participating in prostitution in Cuba gave them a chance at marrying someone foreign, being able to leave Cuba, and of economic success. Those that accomplished this goal, or aimed towards it, did not necessarily end up being victims of trafficking but their chances of exploitation by deception from foreigners increased significantly.

== Current State of Human Trafficking in Cuba ==
In the current state of human trafficking in Cuba, the United States government has been discussing legislation regarding the human trafficking of Cuban baseball players who legally aren't allowed to move into the US. They decide, with hope of great compensation in Major League Baseball, to risk making deals with smugglers and those involved in organized crime to hopefully find a way to enter the United States. The result of the policies enacted fail to adequately address the problem of human trafficking - the financial benefit to those Cuban players who sign free agent contracts within MLB provide enough incentive that they'll willingly put themselves in risky situations to try and defect Cuba and enter the United States. Those involved in Major League Baseball in the United States are aware of the situations Cuban players must undergo to reach American soil and potential recruitment to MLB, but choose to overlook it in order to still acquire the talent to their teams that Cuban baseball players provide. Joe Kehoskie is an American baseball consultant and a former agent. In 2021 he described this system as being as easy and simple as purchasing items through Amazon (company) or eBay. Essentially, he describes it as purchasing items at a “buy-it-now price, and you're buying human beings.”

However, Cuban players recruited from other countries are legally allowed, in the agreement made between Cuba and the United States, to be recruited by MLB clubs. Therefore, many players essentially risk being smuggled into these other countries in order to participate in MLB auditions. This process forces the players and their families to solely rely on criminal organizations and smugglers to provide them with this passage out of Cuba. This can often lead to trouble and in some cases, players with high skill levels can be wanted by groups engaged in alien-trafficking rings in order for them to profit off the players when they start making money in MLB. One example of this is the story of Yasiel Puig and how he defected from Cuba in 2012. He willingly left Cuba with the help of a murderous Mexican drug cartel. While awaiting further transfer, he wasn't allowed to leave and waited on Isla Mujeres. Some of those involved in an alien-trafficking ring found out that such a skilled player was being held there and planned to “steal” Puig from this holding location. He was then brought to Mexico City, to be recruited by MLB scouts. This resulted in those who kidnapped him forcing profit off of his MLB contract, as well as those who originally brought him out of Cuba never receiving payment for their work.

Additionally, situations of trafficking and human exploitation in Cuba are not only happening near those involved in professional baseball. The Cuban Government itself is the primary employer of the Cuban economy. They employ some people through foreign medical and overseas missions and happen to employ more than 84,000 workers in other countries as of 2018. In some cases, if these Cuban natives want to return home, they force them to stay in and participate in the program by withholding their passports, restricting their movement, and taking backlash out on their family members who are residing back in Cuba. The living and working conditions in these countries can also often be substandard. In some situations, if those people working in these programs don't return to Cuba as directed, they can be exiled from the country altogether.

Cuba's medical enterprise in Brazil was managed by the Pan American Health Organization. In 2021, four Cuban doctors working in Brazil sued PAHO under the Trafficking Victims Protection Act and Racketeer Influenced and Corrupt Organizations Act in Matos v. PAHO. These doctors were participants in the Mais Medicos program. This program was operated from 2013 to 2017 by the Brazilian government cooperatively with the Cuban government. This organization enforced the rules that Cuba was enacting, including restricting the doctor's movement and allowing them to be put under surveillance by Cuban intelligence. Brazil paid $1.5 billion to PAHO, who then paid Cuba $1.3 billion. The organization pocketed $75 million and the doctors received less than 10%. Brazilian law forbids unequal treatment of foreign workers so many Cuban doctors, upon hearing that they were making less than 10% of what other doctors in Brazil were making, were able to successfully win these lawsuits.

== See also ==
- Human rights in Cuba
- Prostitution in Cuba
