= David Strecker =

- Born: August 12, 1950 (age 76); Minneapolis, Minnesota, United States
- Other name: Cuba Dave
- Occupation: Retired
- Criminal charges: Promoting sex tourism
- Penalty: 5 years in prison

Details
- Date apprehended: September 2015

David Strecker (born August 12, 1950) also known by the alias Cuba Dave, is a retired American laborer who received a 5-year prison sentence in Costa Rica for the promotion of sex tourism. Prior to his arrest and conviction, Strecker was held in preventative detention in San Sebastián prison in San José, Costa Rica. He is the first individual to be targeted for prosecution under Costa Rica's controversial new law, passed in 2012, that makes it illegal for a third party to profit on prostitution.

== Early life ==
David Strecker is a former softball pitcher who grew up in Minneapolis, Minnesota, where he is a member of the Minnesota Softball Hall of Fame. After retiring from his work as a construction contractor, Strecker relocated to Key West, Florida, where he began to make extended trips to various Latin American countries. Strecker later documented these trips in various written articles and photos on his CubaDave web site and Facebook and MySpace pages, where he provided information to readers about his experiences with prostitutes across Latin America.

In a 2013 interview with the Miami New Times, Strecker admitted to being a sex addict, having slept with more than 2,500 women and taking part in prostitution in Cuba, Costa Rica, Colombia and the Dominican Republic, among other locations. A wall in his residence contained photos of women with which he had sexual relations more than 10 times.

== Arrest and trial ==
Authorities in Costa Rica arrested Strecker on September 4, 2015, at Juan Santamaría International Airport while he was attempting to return to the United States. Strecker was charged with promoting sex tourism in Costa Rica, a charged based upon a new 2012 law making it illegal to promote sex tourism. His arrest was precipitated by a complaint to Costa Rica's Organismo de Investigación Judicial (OIJ) in August 2015 by the Fundación Rehab, a non-governmental organization that combats human trafficking in Costa Rica. While the government was preparing its case against Strecker, he was held in preventive detention for 14 months, as he was deemed to be a flight risk. He was unaware a trial date had been set until the eve of the trial, from his public defender. Strecker maintained his innocence during the detention and through his trial, proclaiming himself to be a political prisoner. While he does not deny publishing images and articles about prostitution in Costa Rica, he claims that these articles did not actively promote sex tourism. He told the Florida Keys News that, “In their mind, by me posting things or telling others how to safely do this, I’m promoting prostitution. There are lots of other things to do in Costa Rica. That part of it is only part of the trip, but they’re trying to make this look like that’s all my focus is.”.

Strecker was unable to fund his own legal defense and, with the help of Dennis Eatmon, created a legal defense fund. According to his website CubaDave.com, Strecker was able to raise a total of $1500.00, and needed to raise an additional $1500.00 used to pay his legal expenses.

== Conviction ==
In a trial that lasted only a week, on November 16, 2016, David Strecker became the first person convicted under Costa Rica's new Sex Tourism Law. He was convicted by three judges in San José by unanimous decision. Judge Vivian Obando berated Strecker during the sentencing hearing, telling him that his articles have done “societal harm” to the country's external image. The evidence presented in the trial was principally derived from Strecker's own articles, photos, and various YouTube videos in which he described his sexual exploits.

Strecker was sentenced to a five-year prison term for violating the 2012 law prohibiting the promotion of Costa Rica as a sexual tourism destination. Strecker was released on August 18, 2017, after having his conviction dismissed by an appellate court.

On May 25, 2017, an appellate court vacated the decision against David Strecker, citing fundamental flaws in Costa Rica's Law 9095 and serious flaws in the evidence presented in the case. The prosecution contested the decision. Mr. Strecker remained held in prison while awaiting the outcome of the prosecution's appeal.

A.M. Costa Rica reported on August 18, 2017, that David Strecker has been acquitted and released.
