= List of regions of Latin America =

This is a list of regions commonly used in Latin America.

== Geopolitical regions ==
The four common regions of Latin America

- Central America
- Caribbean (partially; see: Latin America and the Caribbean and Spanish Caribbean)
- Southern Cone

== Geographic regions ==
- Mexico
  - Bajio
  - Huasteca
  - Totonacapan
  - Republic of the Rio Grande
  - Republic of Yucatán
  - Chiapas
  - Mexican Altiplano
  - Regions of Guerrero
  - Regions of Puebla
  - Regions of Oaxaca
- Caribbean
  - Antilles
    - Greater Antilles
    - Lesser Antilles
      - Grenadines
  - Lucayan archipelago
- Central America
  - Isthmus of Panama
  - Mosquito Coast
  - Soconusco
- South America
  - Amazon basin
  - Andes
    - Altiplano
    - Altiplano Cundiboyacense
    - Puna de Atacama
    - Wet Andes
  - Argentine Northwest
  - Atacama Desert
  - Atlantic Rainforest
  - Brazilian Highlands
    - Cerrado
  - Caribbean South America
  - Chilean Central Valley
  - Cuyo
  - Gran Chaco
  - Guianas
  - Llanos
  - Mesopotamia
  - Pampas
  - Pantanal
  - Patagonia
  - Darien gap
  - Paraneña
  - Tierra del Fuego
  - Fjord of the Mountains
  - Isthmus of Tehuantepec
  - Isthmus of Panama
  - Isthmus of Rivas
  - Sertão
  - Zulia
  - Comahue
  - Paraneña

== Historical regions ==
- Aridoamerica
  - Oasisamerica
- Mesoamerica
- Las Californias
- Misiones Orientales
- Guayrá
- South Peru
- North Peru
- Republic of Sonora
- Dutch Brazil
- France Antarctique
- Equinoctial France
- Araucanía
- Futahuillimapu
- La Frontera region of Chile
- Los Llanos, Chile
- Mosquito Coast
- Patagonia
- Acre
- Litoral Department (formerly Bolivia's coast)
- Suyus of the Inca Empire
  - Chinchay Suyu
  - Antisuyu
  - Qullasuyu
  - Kuntisuyu

== Cultural regions ==
=== Iberoamerica, regions where an Iberian language is spoken. ===
==== Hispanoamerica, regions where the Spanish/Castilian language is spoken. ====
===== North America =====
- Aridoamerica – northern Mexico and portions of the American Southwest.
  - Aztlan
  - Comancheria
  - Apacheria
- Oasisamerica – the American Southwest and portions of Northern Mexico.
- Mesoamerica – Central and southern Mexico, Belize, Guatemala, Honduras, El Salvador, Nicaragua, Costa Rica. These cultures have roots in advanced ancient civilizations such as the Aztec and Maya.
- Central America – Belize, Costa Rica, El Salvador, Guatemala, Honduras, Panama, Nicaragua, and Archipelago of San Andrés, Providencia and Santa Catalina (legally part of Colombia, but off the coast of Central America.) Consists mainly of former territories of the Federal Republic of Central America.

===== Spanish Caribbean =====
- Las Antillas Occidentales – Cuba, Puerto Rico, Spanish Virgin Islands, Dominican Republic. This region is highly influenced by the Canary Islanders and the African slaves that settled in the region during the Age of Exploration.
- Lesser Antilles. Influenced and colonized by other European empires
  - West Indies Federation
- Caribbean Mainland – Coastal and island regions of Mexico (such as the Riviera Maya, Cozumel, and Isla Mujeres), Belize, Guatemala, Nicaragua, Honduras, Costa Rica, Panama, Colombia, and Venezuela. Historic trade across the Caribbean Sea between these nations have created many cultural similarities.
- Florida – although not in the Caribbean Sea, the US State of Florida has been historically and culturally tied to the Spanish Caribbean since Spanish have settled in the age of the Spanish Empire.

===== South America =====
- Gran Colombia – Colombia, Ecuador, Panama, Venezuela, and Northern Peru. Although Gran Colombia dissolved in 1831, members of this region still share many cultural attributes in terms of food, language, music, and history.
- Peru-Bolivian Confederation
- Andean regions – Colombia, Ecuador, Peru, Northern Chile, Bolivia, and northwestern Argentina. Much of the culture found in this region can be traced back to the Inca Empire. Quechua is still spoken as a second language in many of these regions.
- Gaucho regions – Argentina, Uruguay and southern Brazil. The culture of these regions were heavily influenced by the South American cowboy, known as the gaucho.
- Rioplatense region – Argentina, Uruguay, Brazil, and parts of Paraguay. This region, due to extensive immigration from Europe, mainly from Italy, Spain, and Portugal maintains a very European culture in terms of cuisine, art, architecture, and dialect. Many Italian loanwords are used in the dialect of the region, Rioplatense Spanish.
- Mapuche world
  - Futahuillimapu
  - Wallmapu
  - Puelmapu

==== Lusoamerica, regions where the Portuguese language is spoken. ====
===== Brazil =====
- South – Paraná, Rio Grande do Sul, Santa Catarina. Much of the culture of this region is derived from European immigrants, mainly from Italy and Germany.
- Central-West – Goiás, Mato Grosso and Mato Grosso do Sul. Culture is derived from livestock herders.
- Northeast – Maranhão, Piauí, Ceará, Rio Grande do Norte, Paraíba, Pernambuco, Alagoas, Sergipe and Bahia, Fernando de Noronha. Syncretic culture of Portuguese and African elements. Heavily influenced by the African slave trade.
- North-Acre, Amapá, Amazonas, Pará, Rondônia, Roraima. Mestizo culture blending indigenous, Portuguese, Spanish and French elements.
- Southeast – Espírito Santo, Minas Gerais, Rio de Janeiro and São Paulo. Cosmopolitan region of heavily blended African, European, and indigenous cultures.

=== Guianas ===
- Portuguese Guiana (Now Amapa)
- Dutch Guiana (Now Suriname)
- British Guiana (Now Guyana)
- Spanish Guiana
- French Guiana

=== l'Amérique francophone, regions where the French language is spoken. ===
==== North America, comprising Anglicized and Americanized French cultures. ====
- Louisiana, one of the 50 states in the United States.
- Quebec, a province in Canada.
- Saint Pierre and Miquelon.

==== Caribbean, comprising mainly Africanized French cultures. ====
- Guadeloupe
- Haiti
- Martinique
- Saint Barthelemy
- French Guiana
  - Inini
- Saint-Martin

== Ecological regions ==
- Galápagos
- Interandean Valles
- Mesoamerican Biological Corridor
- Caatinga
- By country:
  - List of ecoregions in Brazil
  - Category:Ecoregions of Bolivia
  - List of ecoregions in Chile
  - List of ecoregions in Cuba
  - List of ecoregions in Mexico
  - Natural regions of Peru
