= International rankings of Cuba =

The following are international rankings of Cuba.

== Baseball ==
- International Baseball Federation: Men's Baseball World Rankings, ranked 1 out of 73 countries

== Demographics ==
- United Nations: Population, ranked 74 out of 242 countries
- CIA World Factbook: Urbanization ranked 46 out of 193 countries

== Economy ==
- United Nations Development Programme: Human Development Index 2019, ranked 72 out of 189 countries.
- World Bank: GDP per capita 2011, ranked 92 out of 190 countries.
- CIA World Factbook: GDP per capita 2011, ranked 92 out of 191 countries.

== Education ==
- UNESCO: Youth Literacy Rate, ranked 6 out of 168 countries
- UNESCO: Adult Literacy Rate, ranked 7 out of 171 countries
- UNESCO: Elderly Literacy Rate, ranked 9 out of 168 countries
- World bank: Quality of education, ranked 1 out of 18 Latin American and Caribbean countries

== Environment ==
- Yale Center for Environmental Law and Policy and Columbia Center for International Earth Science Information Network: 2016 Environmental Performance Index ranked 45 out of 180 countries.

== Geography ==
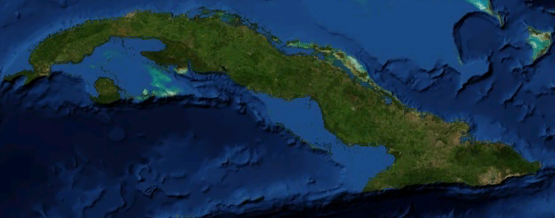
Cuba is the largest country by land area in the Caribbean, and its main island is the seventeenth-largest island in the world by land area

- Total area ranked 106 out of 249 countries and outlying territories.
- Renewable water resources ranked 106 out of 174 countries.

== Globalization ==
- 2017 KOF Index of Globalization: ranked 134 out of 207.
- A.T. Kearney/ Foreign Policy magazine Globalization Index: not ranked.

== Healthcare ==
- World Bank: Mortality Rate Under 5, ranked 40 out of 215 countries.
- World Health Organization: Life expectancy, ranked 33 of 184 countries

== Military ==
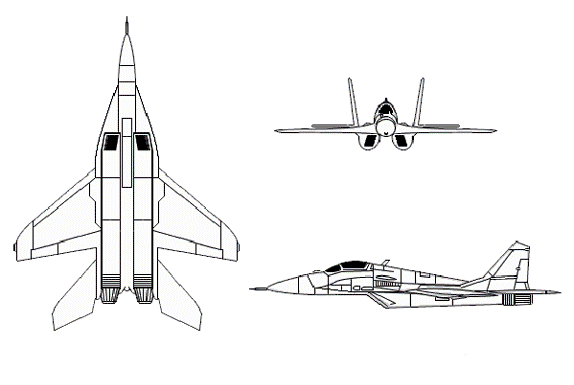
Cuba has four Mikoyan MiG-29s in inventory as of January 2011

- CIA World Factbook: Defense spending as a percent of GDP, ranked 29 out of 172 countries.
- Institute for Economics and Peace: 2016 Global Peace Index, ranked 85 out of 163.

== Politics ==
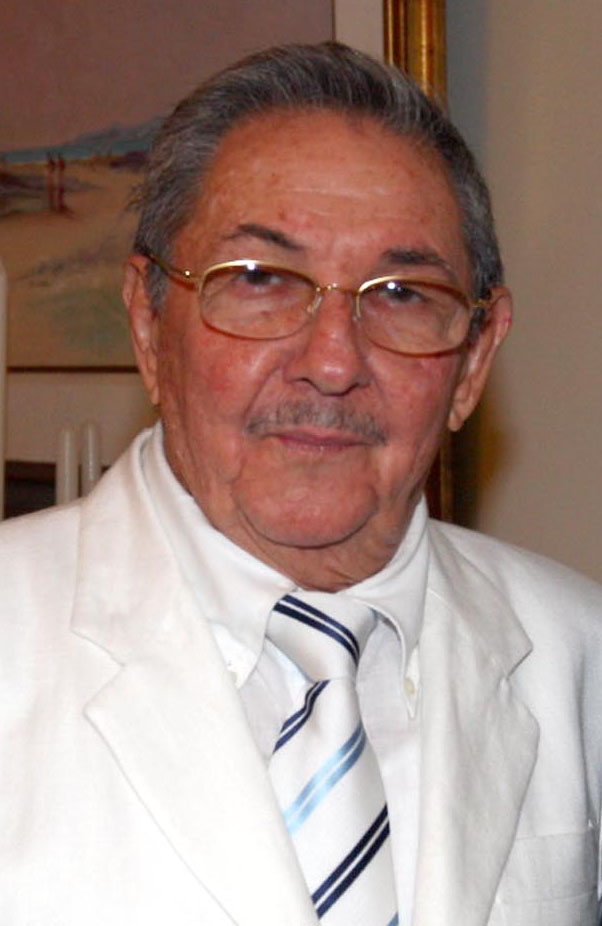
First Secretary of the Communist Party of Cuba Raúl Castro

- Transparency International: 2017 Corruption Perceptions Index, ranked 62 out of 176 countries.
- Inter-Parliamentary Union: Women in national parliaments, ranked 2 out of 192 countries.
- Reporters Without Borders: 2016 Press Freedom Index, ranked 171 out of 180 countries.
- The Economist Intelligence Unit: Democracy Index 2008, ranked 126 out of 167 countries.
- Freedom House: 2012 Global Press Freedom: ranked 190 out of 197.

== Society ==
- United Nations Development Programme 2014 Human Development Index ranked 67 out of 187.
- Economist Intelligence Unit: Quality-of-life Index not ranked
- University of Leicester: 2006 Satisfaction with Life Index ranked 83 out of 178.

== Tourism ==
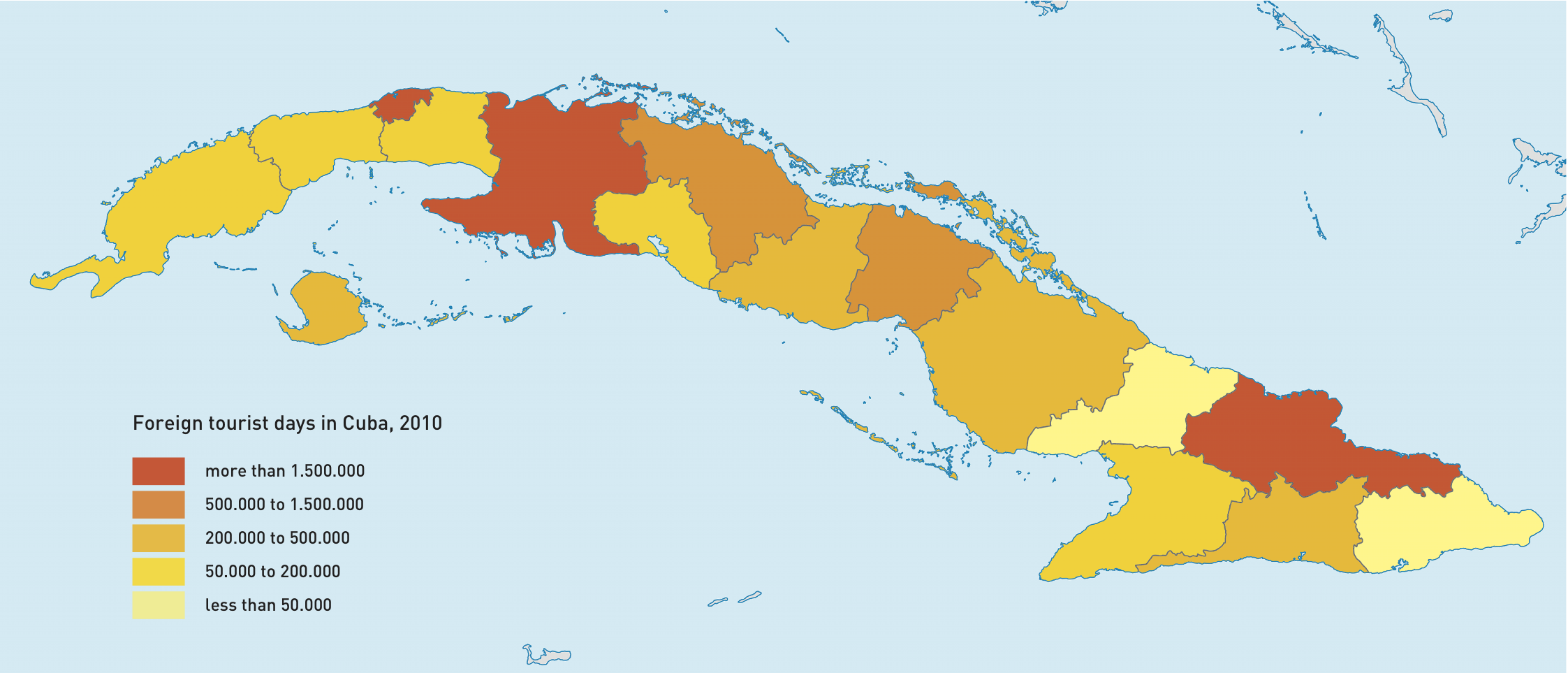
Total foreign tourist days spent in Cuba by district for the year 2010

== Transportation ==
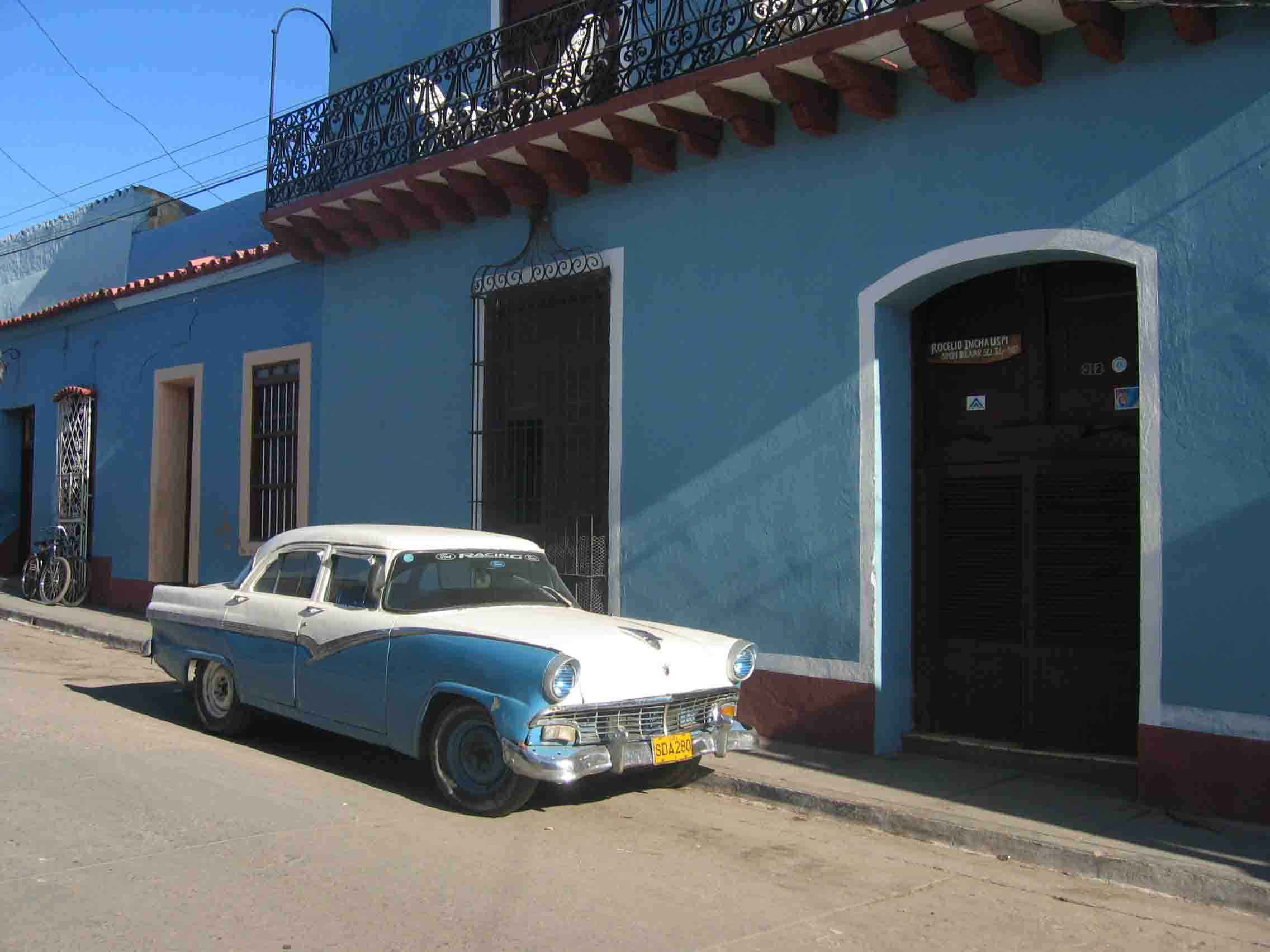
The so-called yank tanks remain in use from pre-revolutionary days

- Motor vehicles per capita ranked 118 out of 144 countries

== See also ==
- Outline of Cuba
