= April 2003 executions in Cuba =

Last execution in Cuba before moratorium

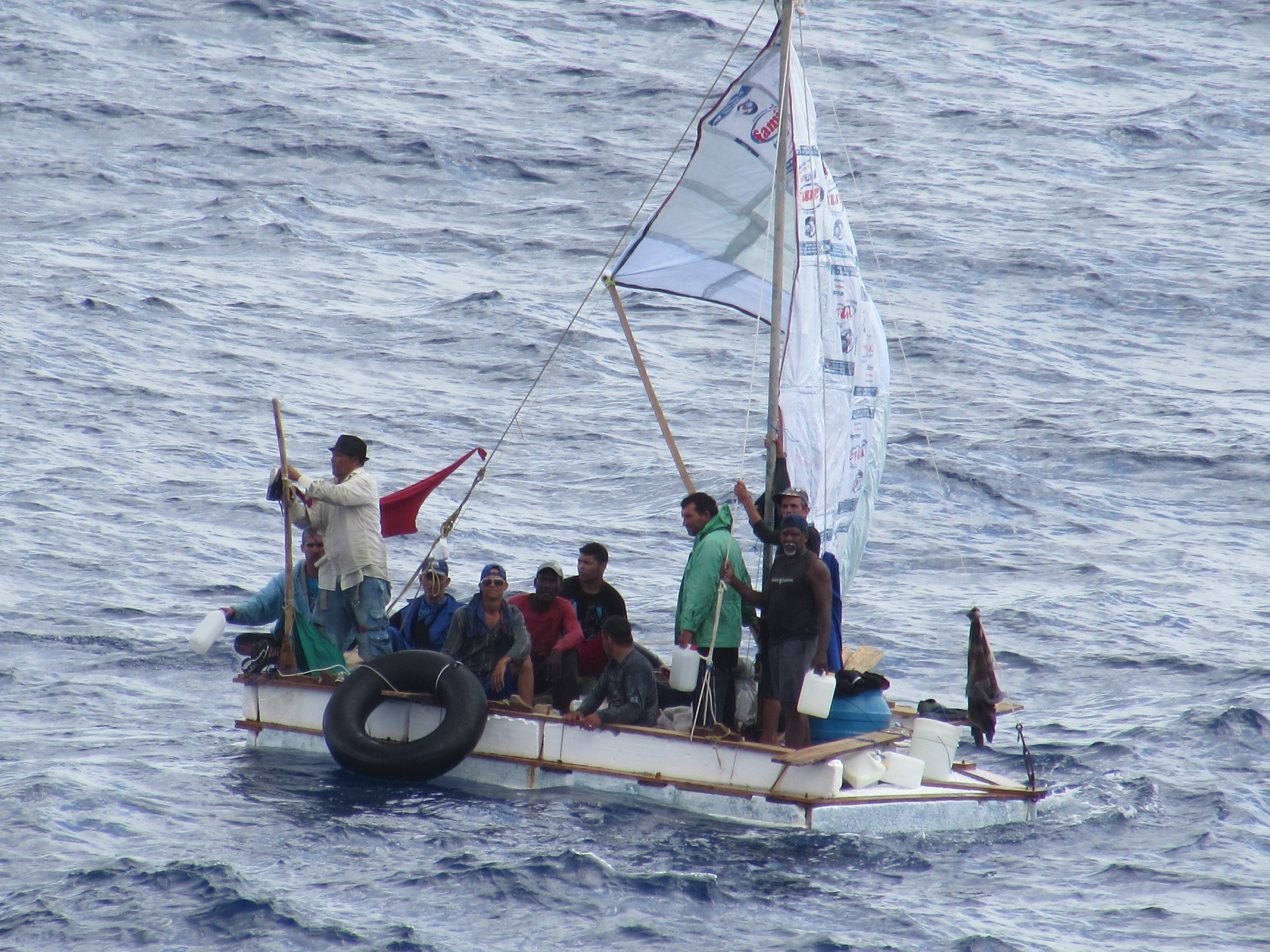
- At the time, the Cuban government sought to crackdown on hijackings aimed at reaching U.S. shores (picture of Cuban exiles, 2014)
- Date: 11 April 2003
- Time: Early morning

On 11 April 2003, Lorenzo Enrique Copello Castillo, Bárbaro Leodán Sevilla García, and Jorge Luis Martínez Isaac, became the last persons to be executed by Cuba before the imposition of a moratorium on executions.

The three men, who were convicted by a court in Havana on 8 April 2003, were put to death by firing squad for acts of terrorism in the aftermath of the Black Spring crackdown on Cuban dissidents.

== Background ==
On 18 March 2003, Cuban authorities arrested more than 75 journalists and other activists during a crackdown on anti-Castro intellectuals and scholars, becoming to be known as the Black Spring. The government was accused of weaponizing the justice system by imposing harsh sentences on those arrested and of torturing some of the prisoners. The crackdown began on the eve of the United States invasion of Iraq and lasted three days. US President George W. Bush and the European Union strongly condemned the arrests, with the latter imposing sanctions on Cuba which remained in place until 2008. The last person arrested during the Black Spring was released in 2011, with most of those involved living in exile since then, mainly in Spain.

On 2 April 2003, Lorenzo Enrique Copello Castillo (aged 31), Bárbaro Leodán Sevilla García (aged 22), Jorge Luis Martínez Isaac (aged 40), and eight others hijacked a ferry with 40 people on board in the Havana Harbor. The vessel was to depart for a short trip to Regla when the hijackers stormed the bridge with guns, attempting to escape to the United States. The ferry ran out of fuel some 45 km (28 mi) off the coast of Cuba, and the hijackers allegedly threatening to kill passengers if not given more fuel to continue the trip to Florida. Upon being alerted of the situation, border troops were dispatched to the area.

In the ensuing operation, prosecutors said that the hijackers threatened to harm hostages and refused to surrender. Cuban officers urged the passengers to jump to the sea. Some passengers, including two French tourists, jumped overboard and were rescued by Cuban guards. One of the armed hijackers –Copello Castillo– was confronted by a passenger and pushed overboard. The eleven hijackers were subsequently arrested by Cuban forces and the passengers were freed without suffering any injury. The ferry was towed back to Havana by the border troops.

== Legal proceedings and executions ==
A news report by the Voice of America on 12 April 2003 described the Cuban legal system as moving at "lightning speed." The trial against the eleven hijackers (eight men and three women) began in Havana on 5 April 2003, three days after the incident. The court found them all guilty on aggravated terrorism charges on 8 April and sentenced three of them (Copello Castillo, Leodán Sevilla, and Martínez Isaac) to death. The other five men were sentenced to life imprisonment, while the three women, who were said to be girlfriends of the hijackers, received sentences ranging from two to five years in prison.

In the three days that followed the verdict, Copello Castillo, Leodán Sevilla, and Martínez Isaac appealed the sentence to the People's Supreme Court and to the Council of State; both bodies rejected the appeal and upheld the death sentence. Communist Party First Secretary Fidel Castro denied their plea for clemency, too.

Copello Castillo, Leodán Sevilla, and Martínez Isaac were executed by firing squad in the early hours of 11 April 2003 in Havana.

== Reactions ==
The executions were met with widespread condemnation. Organizations like Amnesty International condemned the proceedings as flawed. Wayne S. Smith, an American diplomat specialized in Cuban issues, put into question whether the trial had been rational at all. US President George W. Bush and Secretary of State Colin Powell also condemned the executions, with Powell highlighting the "despicable repression" of the Castros and the "harsh punishments" on activists detained during the Black Spring.

Castro and the Cuban government justified the punishments, saying that the hijackings and lack of action by U.S. authorities were "part of a sinister plan of provocations devised by the most extreme sectors in the U.S. government (and) their allies –the terrorist Miami Mafia–, with the only aim of creating conditions and pretexts to attack our country."

Yordanis Montoya, the sister of Martínez Isaac, said that she and her mother were not informed about the execution until after it happened. Montoya, who resided in Miami, added that she went to a local cemetery and shouted anti-Castro slogans, which caused police to remove her from the cemetery.

== Convictions ==
Table
Number	Name	Charge	Criminal penalty
1	Lorenzo Enrique Copello Castillo	Terrorism	Death
2	Bárbaro Leodán Sevilla García	Terrorism	Death
3	Jorge Luis Martínez Isaac	Terrorism	Death
4	Maikel Delgado Aramburo	Terrorism	Life in prison
5	Yoanny Thomas González	Terrorism	Life in prison
6	Harold Alcalá Aramburo	Terrorism	Life in prison
7	Ramón Henry Grillo	Terrorism	Life in prison
8	Wilmer Ledea Pérez	Terrorism	30 years in prison
9	Ana Rosa Ledea Ríos	Terrorism	5 years in prison
10	Yolanda Pando Rizo	Terrorism	3 years in prison
11	Dania Rojas Góngora	Terrorism	2 years in prison
