= Vehicle registration plates of Cuba =

Republic of Cuba
- A Cuban privately issued plate.
- Country: Cuba
- Country code: C (?) or CU (?)

Current series
- Slogan: None
- Size: 660 mm × 330 mm 26 in × 13 in
- Serial format: P 123 456
- Colour (front): Black on white
- Colour (rear): Black on white

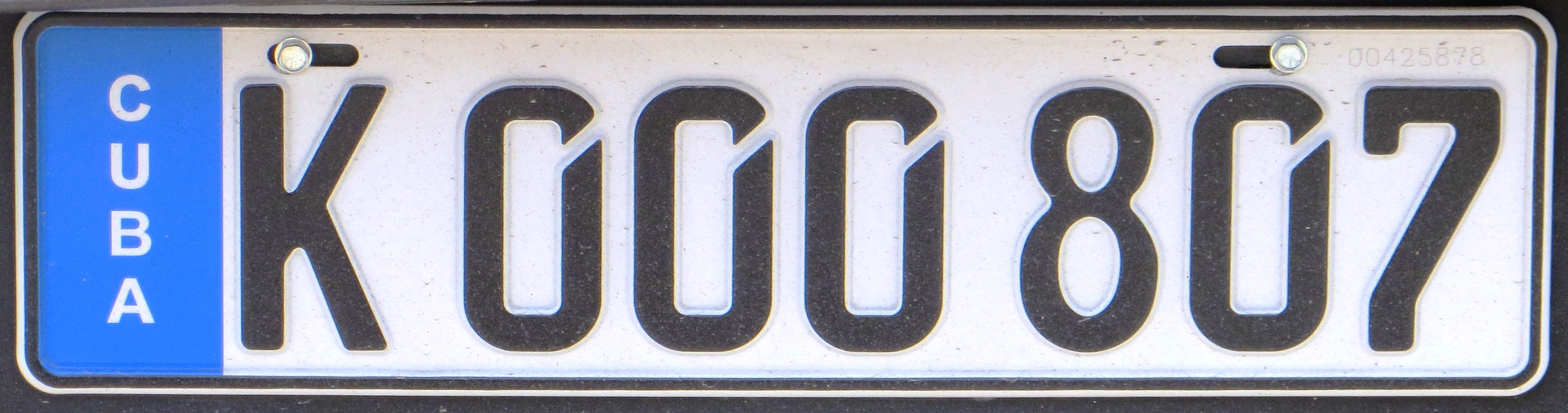
New Cuban licence plates that use FE-Schrift (since 2013)

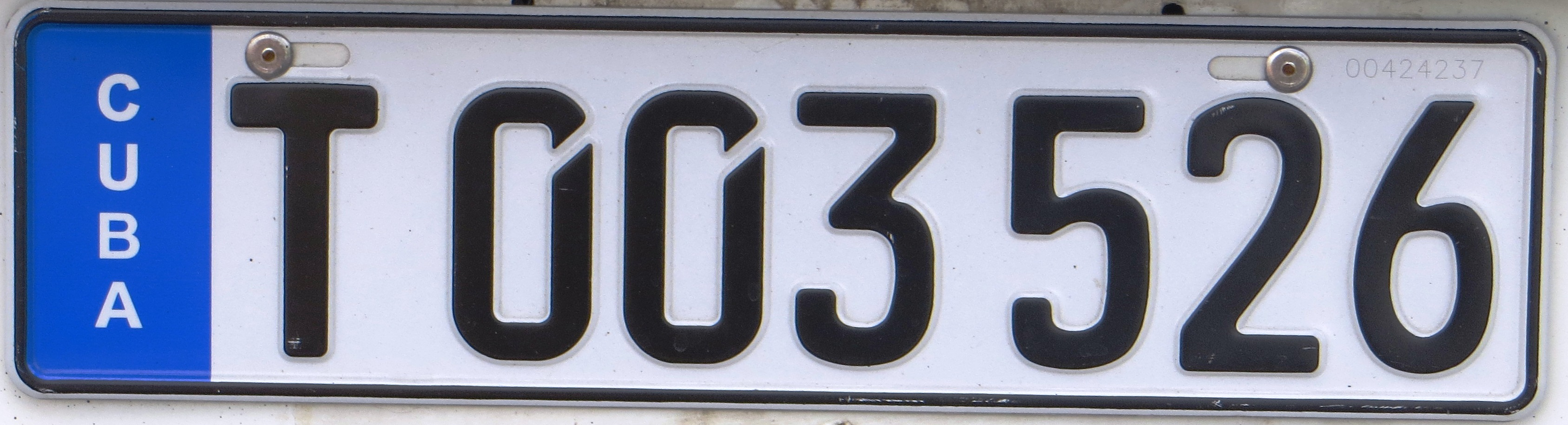
miniatur

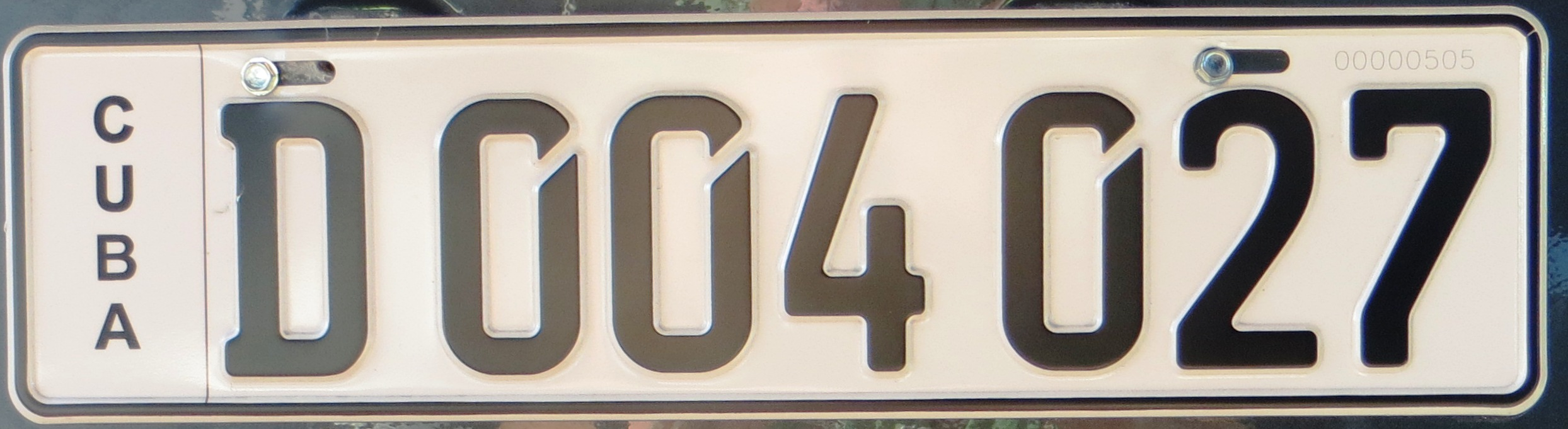
miniatur

miniatur

miniatur

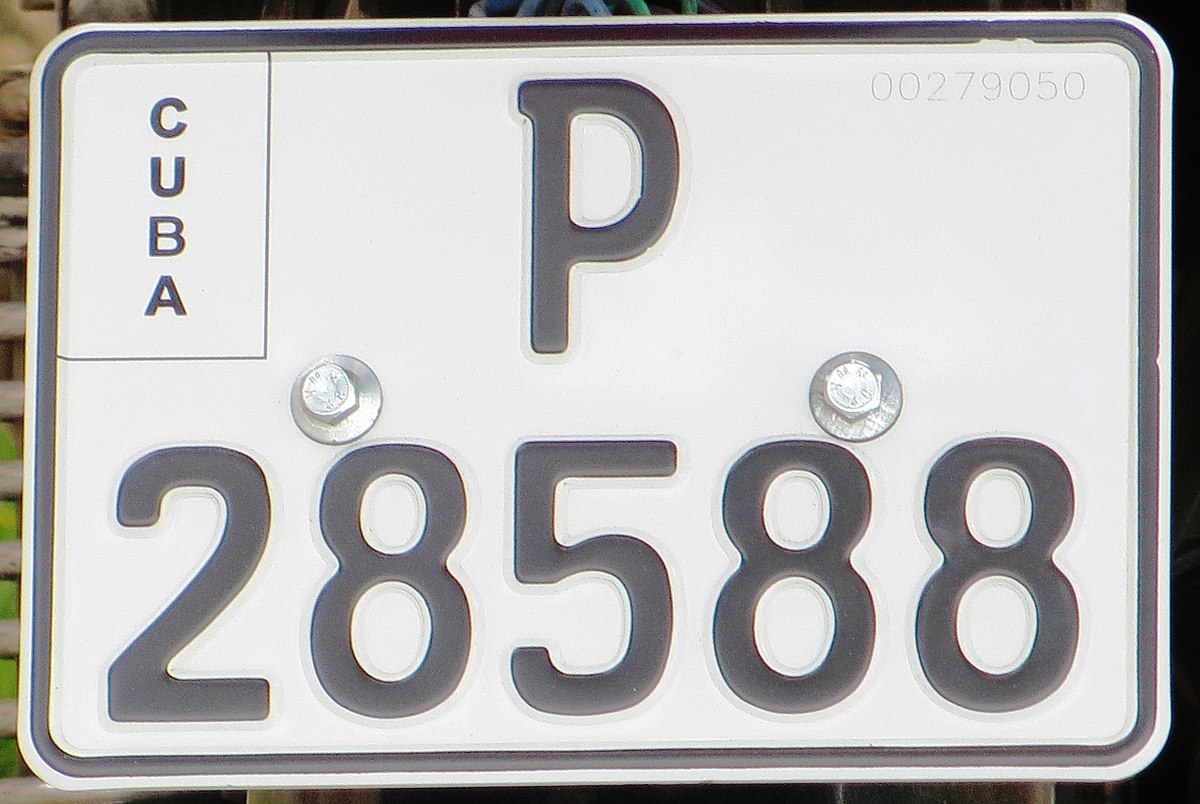
miniatur

The current vehicle registration plate system of Cuba was introduced in May 2013. Current plates are European standard 420 mm × 110 mm, completely replacing the previous system introduced in 2002. The international vehicle registration code for Cuba is C.

== New registration system ==
The new system uses a standard manufacturer format, where the alphanumeric code will have one letter and six digits, grouped into two groups of three to facilitate identification (A 123 456), in the case of vehicles, such as cars and trucks, and a letter and five digits for motorcycles.

In this way, 20 million possible combinations can be obtained in the case of the first vehicles and 1,699,983 variants for motorcycles. Cars and trucks will have license plates 420 mm long by 110 mm wide; and motorcycles with 200 mm length by 140 mm width.

All the badges are white with black characters and have a page on the top right and an image of the Island of Cuba, printed with a laser as a security measure. A blue band (Euroband) on the far left with the word CUBA in a vertical position will have the license plates of legal entities, an element that will differentiate them from the license plates of natural persons, when the variety of background colors disappears, since the plates will not identify the sector to which the medium belongs.

In this system, the province to which the vehicle belongs is not reflected, as was the case previously, but only certain sectors are identified, which allows for an increase in alphanumeric combinations, facilitating continuous production, reducing the deposit of license plates in each province and reusing reservations available in any territory.

The letter A identifies the official license plates, currently white; the letters C, D, and E, for the diplomatic sector; the letter K for foreigners, the letters F and M to identify FAR and MININT, respectively, and the T, for vehicles rented to tourism. The rest of the letters have no meaning.

Vehicles assigned to the protocol service will also be identified with a sticker with a dark blue border and the text 'PROTOCOL. The vehicles belonging to the foreign press will also have a sticker with a green border and the text 'P.EXT. Both decals will be placed in the center of the top of the front windshield. The letters I, O, Q, S, W and Z will not be used to avoid confusion in identification.

In cases of loss or deterioration, the license plate will be changed for a new one and that provisional plate that previously existed, red in color, will be eliminated. In this way, the lost license plate can be circulated, thus eliminating illegalities with those stolen or found, and the owners, who previously attended twice for this procedure, will only do so once.

The benefits of the registration change refer to the acquisition of larger quantities at lower prices, as a result of the reduction in the number of color combinations. Losses and damages should be reduced with the implementation of this system, since the plates will have a better fixation in the defenses of the vehicles, eliminating the vibrations of the plate due to the effects of the air. This system also brings advantages related to human identification and technological systems, due to the better separation and avoids the poor contrast between the background color and its characters, the diversity of colors and other factors that influence the illegibility of the license plate such as, for example, the confusion between some characters such as O with Q and with zero; the B with the 8, the Z with the 2.

== Prior registration systems ==
The automobile license plates of Cuba in the period 2002 to 2013, contained three letters and three digits. The color of the plates is also an important element of identification. Ordinary (non-special) plates had a number at the bottom center of the plate ranging from 0 to 9, indicating the type of vehicle.

== 1920s-2002 ==
From the 1950s through 1978, and again from 2002 through 2013, plates were North American standard 6 × 12 inches (152 × 300 mm).

Image	First issued	Design	Slogan	Serial format	Serials issued	Notes
	1929-1930					
	1935-1936					
	1939					July expiry
	1950					official
	1955					January expiry
	1955					July expiry
	1956					January expiry
	1956					July expiry
	1957					January expiry
	1957	white on black				July expiry-black version
	1957					July expiry-green version
	1958					January expiry
	1958					July expiry-white version
	1958					July expiry-red version
	1959					January expiry
	1959					July expiry
	1960	yellow on light blue				January expiry
	1960	black on white				July expiry-white version
	1960					July expiry-aqua version
	1961	yellow on black				January expiry-last semi-annual plate
	1962	black on white				
	1974					municipal-colors varied
	1974					municipal-colors varied
	1978	black on orange-yellow				
	1978	black on white				
	1978					Government
	1978					Diplomatic
	1978					Company
	1978					State
	1978					Taxi
	1978					Tourism

== 2002 format ==
Cuban vehicle registration plates contained three letters and three numbers. The colour of plates is also an important identification element. Ordinary (non-special) licence plates have also a number on the lower central part of the plate ranging from 0 to 9, denoting the type of the vehicle. As of 2016, some of these plates are still in use, but are being phased out. Particular refers to privately owned vehicles. The letter denotes the expiry month: E = Enero (January), J = Julio (July).

The first letter denotes the province where the licence plate was issued. Until 2011, "B" was used by the former La Habana Province.

Province	First letter of licence plate
Pinar del Río	P
Artemisa	?
Mayabeque	B
Ciudad de La Habana	H
Matanzas	M
Cienfuegos	F
Villa Clara	V
Sancti Spiritus	S
Ciego de Ávila	A
Camagüey	C
Las Tunas	T
Granma	G
Holguín	O
Santiago de Cuba	U
Guantánamo	N
Isla de la Juventud	I

The second letter identifies the type of vehicle owner.

Second letter	Colour	Meaning
A	white	government ministers, provincial officials, and other important state persons
A	light brown	authorised government and official persons of lower rank
E / F / G / H	yellow	private vehicles
K	yellow	vehicles and motorcycles owned by foreign natural persons
K	light brown	vehicles and motorcycles owned by foreign and mixed companies, foreign journalists, religious institutions
R	yellow	private motorcycles and "cocotaxis"
D / S / T / U / V / W	blue	state owned vehicles
Y / Z	blue	state owned motorcycles

The vehicle type number can be found on the lower central part of the plate, it is a one digit number ranging from 0 to 9, it denotes the type of the vehicle. This is not used on special licence plates.

Image	Design	Notes
	black on yellow	private vehicle
	white on orange	private vehicle-note Cuban plates are often repaired and repainted by their owners as they become weathered
	black on orange	private vehicle
	white on azure	state owned vehicle
	black on reflective green	Ministry of the Interior
	white on black	diplomatic
	white on dark red	tourism
	white on brown	joint venture company

== Special licence plates ==
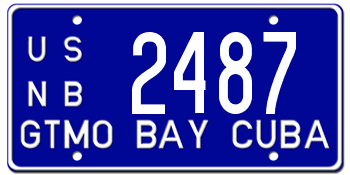
1961 Guantanamo Bay Naval Base plate

Cars of the Cuban Army and the Cuban Ministry of Interior use plates with one letter (A, B, C, F or S) followed by five digits. On the cars of the Cuban Army there is a "FAR" (Fuerzas Armadas Revolucionarias) inscription in the central lower part of the licence plate. In the case of the Ministry of Interior, there is a "MININT" (Ministerio del Interior) inscription. Licence plates of the Army are always light green, while plates of the Ministry of Interior are dark green.

Diplomatic cars use 6 digits without preceding letters. There is a "D", "C" or "E" letter in the lower left part of the licence plate (D = diplomatic, C - consular, E - other status). They have a black licence plate.

Cars for hire have a dark red licence plate beginning with "T" letter (meaning turista), followed by five digits in white color. The border of the plate is also in white.

Provisional licence plates are light red and have the normal code of the province followed by 4 digits and a "P" letter.

Cars of the United States military in the Guantanamo Bay use licence plates with one letter and four numbers, and texts "U.S.N.B." and "Gtmo Bay Cuba".
