= History of Cuban nationality =

For most of its history, Cuba was controlled by foreign powers. The country was a Spanish colony from approximately 1511 until 1898. The United States governed the nation from 1898 to 1902, and would intervene in national affairs until the abolishment of the Platt Amendment in 1935. The struggle for independence and a national identity was a complex and prolonged affair that began in earnest during the late 18th century and lasted well into the 20th century.

== Spanish colonial period ==
From the island's discovery in 1492 to 1750, Spain ruled Cuba from afar, with a Crown-appointed Governor overseeing the colony under the military title of Captain General. Laws approved by the Governor crossed the Atlantic and were then filtered between countless levels of colonial bureaucracy. The administrators tended to compromise with local elites, who were often granted permission to administer justice themselves.

In the 1630s, Americans were permitted to hold office in Cuba; by 1678, they were allowed to hold judgeships. These positions were quickly filled by wealthy criollo, who often purchased the privilege directly, and operated with reduced Spanish supervision. This led to increased corruption, and drove a wedge between the wealthy and the working-class. In the 1750s, when Spain sought to reassert control in the Americas, these elite positions were greatly weakened, much to the anger of those who had enjoyed the collateral benefits of authority.

In the early 19th century, Cuban nationalist movement lagged behind its counterparts in the rest of Latin America. Maintaining good relations with Spain was essential for the health of Cuba's primarily agrarian economy, as the island nation was heavily dependent at the time upon exporting its sugar to European markets. Cuba, as one of the last outposts of slavery, also relied on Spain for protection against any potential slave uprisings. As compared to most other Latin American countries at the time, a very large percentage of the Cuban population were Spaniards or their descendants; the native Taíno and Ciboney peoples had mostly disappeared in Cuba early in the colonial period.

Nonetheless, during the 19th century, vocal nationalists like Jose Marti inspired Cubans to rebel against their colonizers. Many nationalists saw Spain as incapable of supporting a booming Cuban economy. Cuba made use of new industrial technologies, such as steam engines, well before their large-scale introduction in Spain. Nationalists thus concluded that Cuba was entering a new stage of modernity, while Spain was becoming more and more obsolete, and holding Cuba back from economic and political success.

The dissatisfaction with Spain's inept administration, their lack of representation in the government, and high taxes sparked the beginning of the 10 years war in which over 200,000 lives were lost. Being crushed by the Spanish army only fueled their nationalism even more. It caused a uniting of all the Cuban people, with an emphasis on former slaves, who were freed shortly after the war. However, when the Cubans rose up again, Spain implemented their policy of Reconcentration. This forced hundreds of thousands of Cubans into labor camps, where they worked and were starved. This furthered their nationalism even more because they couldn't take what was being done to their own people. The stories of the rebels' bravery and nationalism eventually reached the United States, who sent aid which soon became the Spanish–American War. However, the Spanish control of Cuba soon became replaced with a large American influence in Cuba's affairs. Once again Cuban nationalism was an at an all-time high since they had just fought for their own independence, and now they had another country in their affairs.

== Integration of former slaves ==
Between 1780 and 1867, over 780 000 slaves were brought to Cuba. This was more than all the rest of Spanish America combined. Slavery was leaned upon heavily by the owners of the highly profitable sugar plantations. By 1886, people of colour – the majority being ex-slaves – made up 1/3 of the population of Cuba. The issue of integration was a complex and highly contentious issue. Rights were hard to come by for many former slaves and also for those who lived and worked in rural communities. Emancipation was a slow process that started in 1868 and continued until 1886. As a preliminary step, the Moret Law of 1870 granted freedom to children and those over the age of sixty but offered little else. As the skirmishes continued and losses compounded during the 10 Years’ War, the anti-colonial forces spoke more openly about the idea of a free Cuban citizen. Even though there was still a strong racial divide, many slaves joined up with the revolutionaries. Although this initial rebellion did not force any significant changes, the participation of slaves did not go unnoticed. By the early 1890s, Spain was willing to offer fairly considerable civil rights and voting rights to many former slaves in a vain attempt to weaken another attempt at rebellion. Prior to the 1890s, suffrage had been granted uniquely to taxpayers (it was further expanded in 1895 and again in 1898 when all links between property and suffrage were severed). This back-fired, however, as it only provoked white elites who intensified their criticism directed at colonial policies.

While white Cuban elites and their colonial administrators debated civil rights and public policy, black Cubans had already been showing initiative. The first step toward property rights came when farm owners allowed their slaves to own a pig. A pig could grow, accrue value, be sold for profit or consumed. Many people quickly seized upon the potential of this and began raising as many pigs as possible, even feeding them from their own rations to keep them growing. The pigs would then be sold to either the plantation owner or someone else, and a profit would be made. These profits would sometimes parlay into the ownership of a horse, which implied a certain degree of freedom and mobility. Worker mobility was also important in spreading information (concerning revolution, property rights, etc.) to other interested communities.

After slavery was phased out by 1888, many former slaves had little choice but to stay on the farms on which they had been prisoners for years. The plantation owners adapted to the situation by incorporating wage labour, tenantry and contract farming. After gaining their freedom, some more fortunate ex-slaves were sold small plots of land where they could build a house and plant crops for their own consumption and for sale at market. According to the Spanish Civil Code, rights of possession were paramount, making a signed and verified agreement very important. In 1890, however, a new civil code (which had been introduced in Spain the year before) came into effect which acknowledged the rights of prescription (squatter's rights). Granted, these rights were minimally recognized, but still they motivated many landless workers to occupy and cultivate previously unused land.

== Struggles for freedom ==
- Ten Years' War (1868–1878)
- The Little War (1879–1880)
- Cuban War of Independence (1895–1898)

== US occupation ==
There was no mass departure of the Spanish middle-class in the years immediately after the end of Spanish rule. They were allowed to maintain their Spanish citizenship and also to hold onto the majority of the elite posts available in business and in the Church. A misguided education system had ill-prepared Cubans from filling positions in expanding industries which were primarily driven by US interests. When the occupation officially ended on May 20, 1902, nationalists could, for the first time, look upon an independent Cuba. Although it was a time of celebration, it would prove to be a difficult transition to complete autonomy and self-definition. The island-nation had always had her national identity threatened and had been under repressive foreign control for centuries. With no real pre-Spanish nationalist mythology to speak of, Cubans would have to quickly try and identify themselves in the modern world. Even with a crisp demarcation of borders and territory, it would not be immediately clear what it meant to be Cuban.
