= Prostitution in Cuba =

Prostitution in Central America and the Caribbean. Cuba (in blue) is abolitionist, meaning prostitution is legal, but organized third-party involvement such as pimping and brothels are illegal.

Prostitution in Cuba is legal; however, there is legislation against pimps, sexual exploitation of minors, and pornography. Sex tourism has existed in the country, both before and after the 1959 Cuban Revolution. Many Cubans do not consider the practice immoral. In Cuban slang, female prostitutes are called jineteras, and gay male prostitutes are called jineteros or pingueros. The terms literally mean "jockey" or "rider", and colloquially "sexual jockey", and connote sexual control during intercourse. The terms also have the broader meaning of "hustler", and are related to jineterismo, a range of illegal or semi-legal economic activities related to tourism in Cuba. Stereotypically a jinetera is represented as a working-class Afro-Cuban woman. Black and mixed-race prostitutes are generally preferred by foreign tourists seeking to buy sex on the island. UNAIDS estimates there are 89,000 prostitutes in the country.

Sex trafficking is a problem in the country.

== History ==
=== Colonial Cuba ===
The country, and Havana in particular, has often been associated with prostitution in foreign eyes. From the late sixteenth century onwards, Havana was a port of call for transatlantic sailing ships, and developed an economy serving the needs of sailors and passengers. During times of economic slump in Caribbean sugar plantations, slave owners would place slave women on the urban market as prostitutes, or send out female slaves as prostitutes for ships' crews. Havana's rapidly expanding urban population in the mid-nineteenth century, a result of the booming tobacco industry, led to colonial officials relocating prostitutes to the margins of the city. Under Spanish law slaves had the right to buy their own freedom, and some of the slaves working in Havana households used prostitution as a way of raising money for this purpose. The abolition of slavery in 1886, and Cuba's three liberation wars against Spain, resulted in the migration of significant numbers of Afro-Cuban workers to Havana in search of housing and employment. A public debate followed concerning the relationship between the changes in the city's demographics and the levels of prostitution in the city. Havana's prostitutes used pseudonyms to protect their identity, and advertise their personal characteristics or skills. Attempts to regulate prostitution in the late nineteenth century arose as a result of concerns about syphilis among soldiers. After the Spanish–American War, there were attempts to set up "zonas de tolerancia", effectively red-light districts for commercial sex. At this time there were around 200 registered brothels in Havana. Cultural and literary sources attest to the existence of male prostitutes during this period. However, they were not officially classified as prostitutes, but instead treated as criminals guilty of the crime of sodomy.

In Havana, Cuba during the late 19th century, a group of sex workers who called them Las Horizontales produced a newspaper La Cebolla.

=== Independence ===
In 1913, President Mario García Menocal announced Cuba's deregulation law, saying that regulated prostitution was "incompatible with ... the spirit of freedom that governs our nation". During the first half of the 20th century, Havana was thought of, and depicted as, "the whorehouse of the Caribbean". Prostitution in 1920s Cuba was a flourishing business, so much so that the Minister for the Interior made efforts to "solve the problem of prostitution". The number of prostitutes in Havana increased from 4,000 in 1912 to 7,400 in 1931. For many men, a visit to a prostitute was a celebrated feature of a trip to the city. By the late 1950s, about 270 brothels operated in Havana, with more than 11,500 women working as prostitutes. The city's Plaza del Vapor functioned as a large marketplace for prostitution. Descriptions of brothels routinely appeared in tourist guidebooks, and there were sex shows and live pornographic theaters such as the Shanghai Theater and the Tokyo Cabaret. The English novelist Graham Greene, writing in his autobiography Ways of Escape, described: "the Shanghai Theatre where for one dollar and twenty-five cents one could see a nude cabaret of extreme obscenity with the bluest of blue films in the intervals." The American journalist David Detzer wrote that, "Brothels flourished. A major industry grew up around them; government officials received bribes, policemen collected protection money. Prostitutes could be seen standing in doorways, strolling the streets, or leaning from windows". Brothels, casinos, and nightclubs were increasingly controlled by organized crime based in the United States. Tourism had become Cuba's second-largest earner of foreign currency, with around 350,000 visitors per year, and the brothels and bars of Havana catered to Americans visiting on weekend excursions. Cuban prostitutes also worked at the US Guantanamo Bay Naval Base. The sex industry in 1950s Cuba was primarily based on the provision of sexual "services" by black and mixed race women to predominantly white North American men. It drew upon a tradition of exoticising mixed-race Cuban women which originated in the work of male Cuban writers, artists, and poets.

=== Cuban Revolution ===
Following the Cuban Revolution in 1959, the new Cuban government saw prostitutes as victims of corrupt and foreign capitalism, and viewed prostitution itself as a "social illness", a product of Cuba's pre-revolutionary capitalist culture, rather than a crime. In 1961, pimping was outlawed. Prostitution itself remained legal, but the government, assisted by the Federation of Cuban Women, attempted to curb it. Medical clinics for health examinations were established, along with rehabilitation programs for pimps and re-education programs for former prostitutes. A census of the sex industry was conducted in 1961, identifying 150,000 prostitutes and 3,000 pimps. Troops raided the red-light districts of Havana, and rounded up hundreds of women, photographed and fingerprinted them, and required them to have physical examinations. Women who wished to leave prostitution were given training courses, and offered factory jobs. The result was that, officially, prostitution was eliminated from Cuba, a situation that continued for three decades. Transactional sex continued during this period, with some women forming relationships with high-status men, in return for better access to consumer goods. During the "Revolutionary Offensive" of 1968, the claim was made that privately owned nightclubs and bars were havens of prostitution. Most of the remaining private businesses on the island were nationalized. In the 1970s, some women were independently offering sex in Havana hotels, in exchange for consumer goods, but prostitution remained extremely limited until the early 1990s.

=== Special Period ===
Following the dissolution of the Soviet Union in the early 1990s, Cuba experienced economic depression, resulting from the loss of income from Soviet trade. This Special Period saw the re-introduction of elements of market capitalism into the Cuban economy, and prostitution re-appeared. The need for foreign capital resulted in a dual economy. The possession of US dollars became a primary route to prosperity, and prostitution was an avenue used by many women to obtain them. The development of the Cuban tourist industry resulted in the income available from prostitution being many times greater than professional salaries in the country, and university-educated women turned to dollar-earning prostitution in the tourist sector. Young women began selling sex to tourists in a style that resembled the sex tourism that had become established in Southeast Asia, and Cuban prostitutes began to dress in ways that made their profession clear. The British-born writer Pico Iyer reported in 1994 that, "Prostitution, which was scarcely visible (if only for security reasons) five years ago, is pandemic now: The tourist hotels are filled with Cuban teenagers reddening their lips with children's crayons". Prostitution was practiced widely and openly in tourist areas, and was generally tolerated by the police, for the revenue it brought into the country. In some cases, prostitution was seen as a possible route to a better life through marriage and emigration.

In 1995, a new economic policy was introduced, marking the country's worst economic period. Financial need was the primary motivation for people entering prostitution during this time, and Cuba gained a reputation as the "Thailand of the Caribbean". However, in Cuba, the situation had some differences from other developing countries. Prostitutes in Cuba did not work in oppressive conditions, alcohol and drug addiction were not routed into prostitution, and people were not sold into prostitution by their families. Julia O'Connell Davidson noted in her 1996 article "Sex Tourism in Cuba" that, "In Cuba there is no network of brothels, no organized system of bar prostitution; in fact, third-party involvement in the organization of prostitution is rare". Women's fiction increasingly included the subject of prostitution, and Cuban theatres began to stage foreign plays about prostitution. Prostitution also began to be presented in Cuban films, acting as a metaphor for the downfall of the socialist system and for the island being sold out to foreign tourists and investors. Prostitutes were often represented as individualistic, greedy, lazy women. Male-to-male sex workers, known as jineteros or pingueros, appeared during the Special Period, and were a significant part of the developing Cuban gay scene when LGBT rights in Cuba began to develop.

Government attempts to limit prostitution began in 1998, and have continued since. In 2004, prostitutes could still be seen in Havana after sunset, outside the main tourist hotels and certain discos and bars, or hitchhiking along the Malecón highway. Dressed in skimpy clothes, they would proposition tourists or invite them to nightclubs, where cash-for-sex could be suggested more discreetly. However, by 2007, prostitution had been significantly reduced, and was no longer practiced openly and widely in tourist areas.

== Child prostitution ==
Incidents of child prostitution were reported during the Special Period, and subsequent investigations by foreign journalists have reported cases of child prostitution, with the clientele mainly being sex tourists. Cuban laws prohibit the sexual exploitation of individuals aged under 16, and those convicted can be sentenced to maximum of 30 years in prison, or the death penalty if there are aggravating factors.

== Sex trafficking ==
Cuba is a source and destination country for adults and children subjected to sex trafficking. Child sex trafficking and child sex tourism occur within Cuba. Cuban authorities report people from ages 13 to 20 are most vulnerable to human trafficking in the country. Traffickers also subject Cuban citizens to sex trafficking in South America, the Caribbean, and the United States. Traffickers recruit Cuban citizens through promises of work abroad, providing fraudulent contracts and immigration documents for a fee, and subsequently coercing these individuals into prostitution to pay off these debts. The government reported foreign national sex trafficking victims in Cuba.

The penal code's definition of sex trafficking conflates sex trafficking with prostitution and pimping. The law criminalizes inducement to or benefiting from prostitution, but treats force, coercion, and abuse of power or vulnerability as aggravating factors rather than an integral part of the crime. These provisions prescribe penalties ranging from four to 10 years of imprisonment with more severe penalties for complicit government officials.

The United States Department of State Office to Monitor and Combat Trafficking in Persons ranks Cuba as a 'Tier 3 Watch List' country since 2019, before which it was Tier 2.

== AIDS ==
AIDS, which had been controlled through public health measures, began to rise during the 1990s. In the early part of the decade, people with the HIV virus were quarantined. Between 1986 and 1998, a total of 1,980 people tested positive for the virus in Cuba, and a further 3,879 more were discovered to have the virus between 1998 and 2004. According to United Nations sources, the early detection of the virus has been assisted by the country's free primary care clinics. The United States embargo against Cuba has prevented Cuba from purchasing medical supplies from the US, but medical scientists in Cuba have synthesised some of the antiviral drugs used in the management of HIV/AIDS, and these have been provided to patients at no cost. In 2004, the country had thirteen AIDS sanatoriums, and a stay of between three and six months in one was compulsory for anyone found to be HIV positive. At that time, World Health Organization figures put the infection rate at less than 0.1 percent of the population, the lowest in the Western Hemisphere, one-sixth that of the US, and far below that in many neighbouring countries. A public-education campaign in schools and on television and radio promotes the use of condoms and informs people about how HIV is transmitted. Additionally, government subsidies for condoms (both domestic and imported) mean prophylactic prices remain very low. Prostitution is not considered to be a major factor in the spread of AIDS, with only a small number of people admitted to sanatoriums being former prostitutes. The low level of infection and the relatively inexpensive price of sex have made the island popular with foreigners as a sex tourism destination. Another incentive is the lack of social stigma associated with single male tourists visiting Cuba, in comparison with the better-known sex tourism destinations of Thailand and Cambodia.

== See also ==
- Crime in Cuba
- Human trafficking in Cuba
- La Macorina
- Sex tourism
- Sociolismo
- Malandragem
