= Scouting and Guiding in Cuba =

Scouting and Guiding movement in Cuba

Cuba is one of four of the world's independent countries that do not have Scouting; however, Scouting and Guiding in Cuba was served by

- Asociación de Guías de Cuba, former member of the World Association of Girl Guides and Girl Scouts
- Asociación de Scouts de Cuba, former member of the World Organization of the Scout Movement
