= Crime in Cuba =

The Cuban government does not release official crime statistics, since the Cuban Revolution, Cuba has been considered one of the safer countries in Latin America. Gun crime is virtually nonexistent, drug trafficking has been largely curtailed, and there is below-average crisis intervention from police. Murder rates are also below those of most Latin American countries, with an intentional homicide rate of 5.00/100,000 inhabitants (572 intentional homicides) in 2016, lower than any other country in the region.

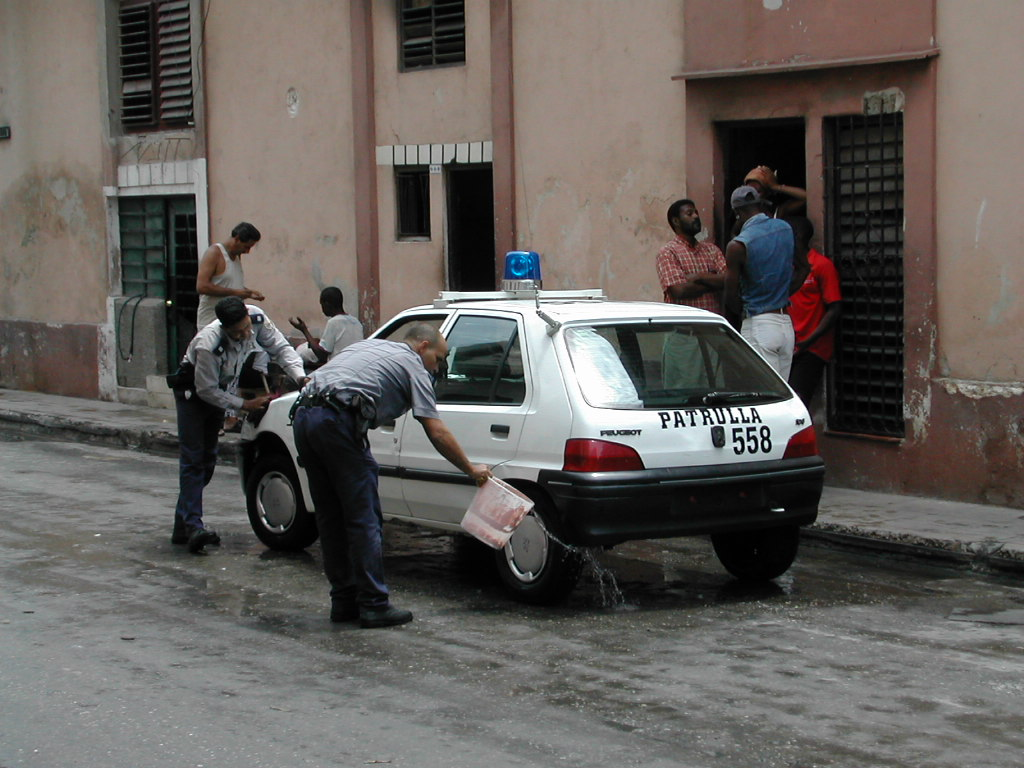
A Cuban police car getting washed in Havana, Cuba (May 2002).

Cuba's revolution led by Fidel Castro, ushered in a socialist system where the government has focused on crime prevention and addressing the root causes of crime, through focusing on poverty and inequality, and promoting social cohesion and solidarity among citizens, as well as community policing, education, and social programs.

At the same time, Cuba also has a high incarceration rate, second in the world only to El Salvador, and the authoritarian nature of the regime, being a one party communist state, has allowed for the strict surveillance of its citizens, raising questions about civil liberties infringements in the government's attempts to reduce crime. The government has also used the strong presence of law enforcement agencies, such as the National Revolutionary Police (PNR), to maintain social order and prevent crime. The government's control over law enforcement agencies, including their structure, operations, and information dissemination, has resulted in limited availability of official crime statistics and concerns about the reliability of state-reported information. These factors make it challenging to accurately assess the crime situation in Cuba. The crisis of Cuba's economy, especially after the end of subsidized oil from Venezuela in 2026, has led to anecdotal reports of a rise in what one observer (journalist Patrick Oppman) calls "relentless petty crime".

== History ==
Cuba's history has been shaped by various political and social changes, including colonization, independence struggles, revolutions, and economic challenges. These factors have influenced the crime landscape in Cuba.

=== 19th century ===
During the colonial period, Cuba was a Spanish colony and experienced high levels of crime, including piracy, smuggling, and illegal slave trading.

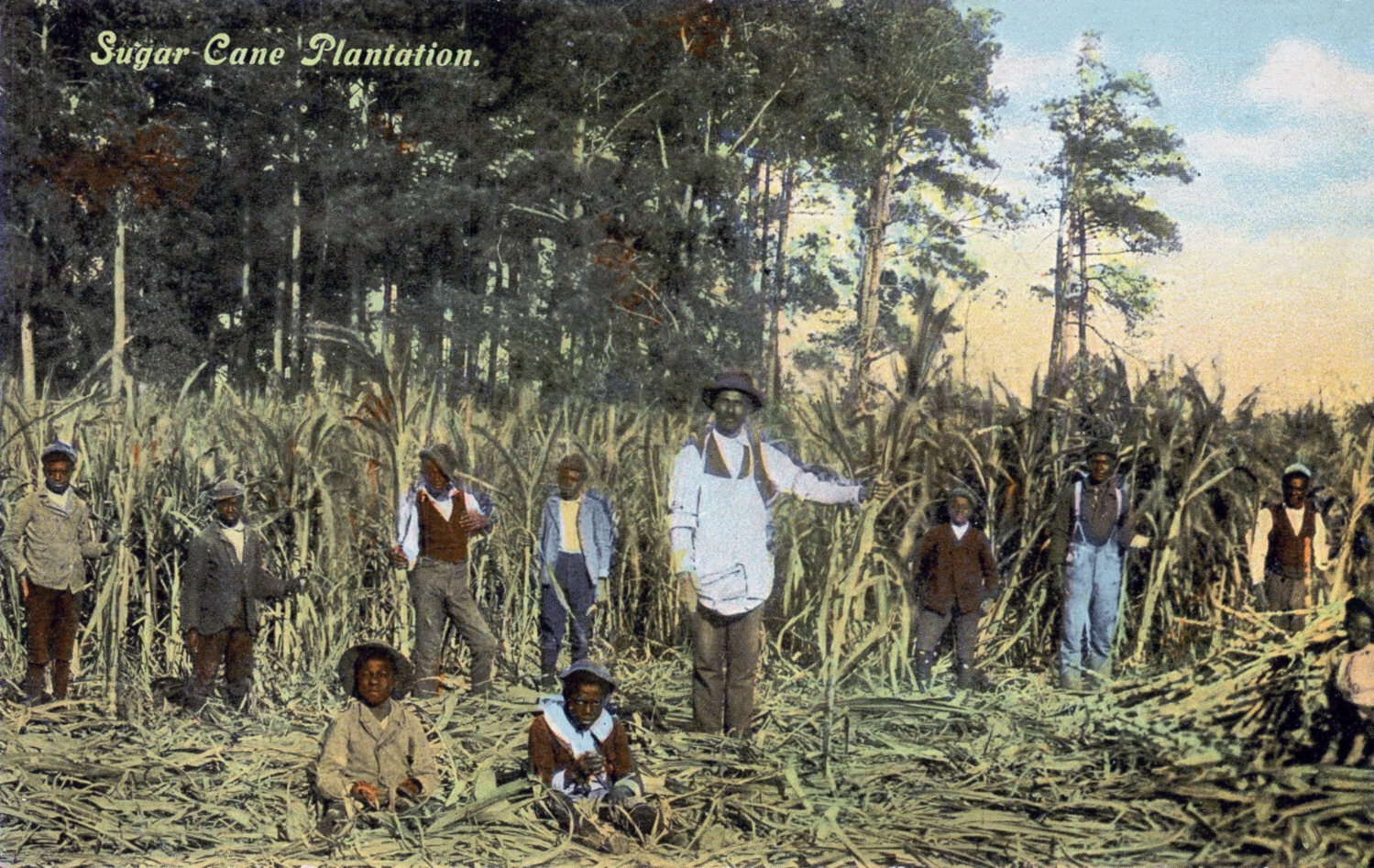
Image of a postcard depicting a Cuban Sugar Cane Plantation (circa 1908)

For instance, despite Spain declaring the abolition of the slave trade in its colonies in 1811 through the Spanish Constitution of Cádiz, slavery persisted in Cuba for the remainder of the century. One of the main reasons for the persistence of slavery in Cuba was the island's thriving sugar industry, which heavily relied on enslaved labor. The increasing demand for labor in the sugarcane plantations led to an increase in the illegal slave trade as well, with plantation owners and traders importing enslaved people from Africa despite it being banned. Additionally, the Spanish government in Cuba did not actively enforce the ban on slavery, and there was widespread corruption among local officials who turned a blind eye to the illegal slave trade. The wealthy planters in Cuba had significant influence and power, which further hindered the enforcement of the ban on slavery.

Meanwhile, the laws, crimes, and punishments pertinent to Cuba were enumerated in the Penal Laws of the Island of Cuba, issued by Spain. The penalties for crimes were subclassified as corporal penalties (including execution by the garrote upon a scaffold), correctional penalties, light penalties, penalties common to the three preceding classes, and accessory penalties. Many crimes were described in the document, under various Titles and Articles such as:

1. Crimes against the external security of the State (such as treason)
2. Crimes against the constitution (such as Lèse-majesté)
3. Crimes against public order (such as rebellion and sedition)
4. Falsitites and falsifications (such as counterfeiting of money or documents)
5. Violation of laws relating to interments, violation of sepulchers and offenses against the public health (such as adulterated medicines)
6. Gambling and raffles (such as unauthorized lotteries)
7. Offenses committed by public employees in the discharge of their office (such as bribery)
8. Crimes against persons (such as dueling)
9. Crimes against chastity (such as rape)
10. Crimes against honor (such as calumny)
11. Crimes against the civil status of persons (such as celebration of illegal marriages)
12. Crimes against liberty and security (such as abduction of infants or abandonment of children)
13. Crimes against property (such as robbery)
14. Reckless negligence

=== Independence from Spain (1902-1959) ===
After gaining independence from Spain in 1902, Cuba experienced political instability, corruption, and organized crime activities, particularly during the Prohibition era in the United States when Havana became a popular destination for American tourists seeking alcohol. The political instability coupled with the influx of American tourists looking for outlets created a conducive environment for crime to thrive, with drug smuggling, prostitution, and illegal gambling becoming rampant.

Between 1902 and 1952, Cuba faced frequent changes in its government— multiple revolutions, coup attempts, and shifts in power— leading to periods of lawlessness and increased violence. Economic factors also played a role in shaping crime in Cuba during this period. The country experienced economic disparities, with a small wealthy elite class and a large poor population, which led to social inequalities and poverty. Economic struggles and lack of opportunities for the marginalized populations are said to have contributed to the occurrence of property crimes, such as theft and robbery, as well as other forms of economic crimes.

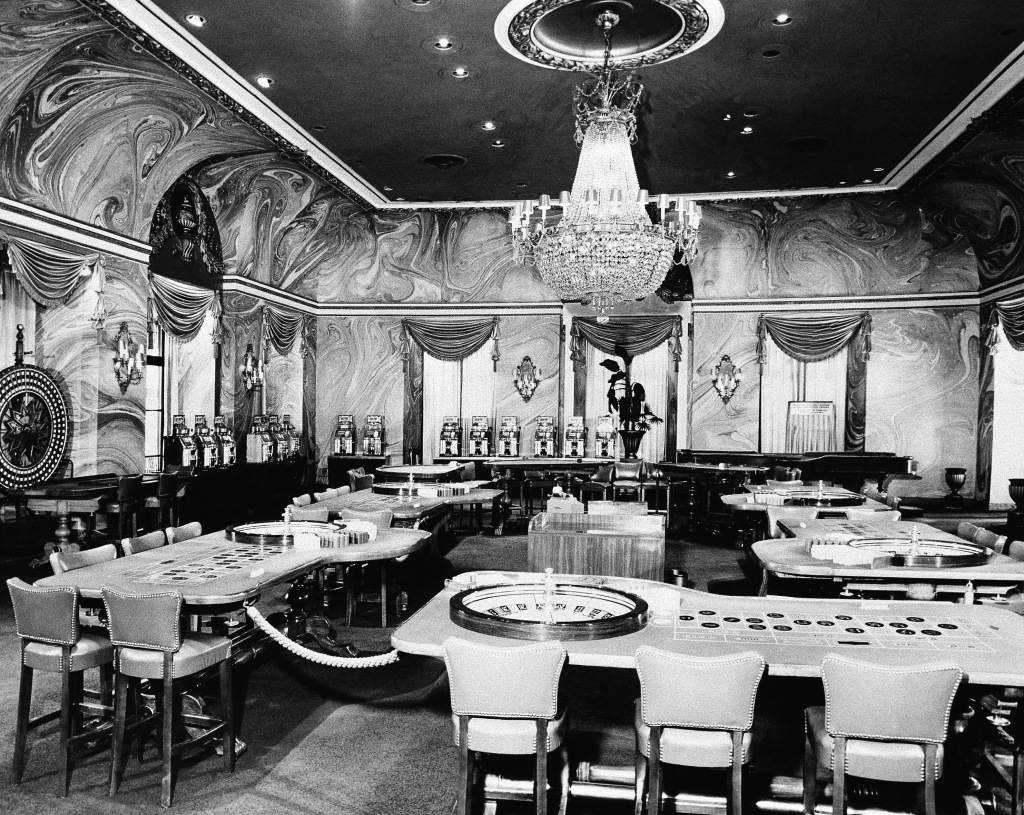
Image of the International Casino in Havana's Hotel Nacional, one of the ten big casinos in Cuba whose operations were run by North Americans (October 1958)

At the same time, American investors and entrepreneurs, including some with ties to organized crime, established a significant presence in Cuba's hospitality industry, including the ownership of casinos. Many of these US-owned casinos in Cuba became notorious for their association with illegal activities, with the mafia and other criminal gangs from the United States using it as a base for various illicit operations. For example, illegal gambling, including rigged games and illegal betting, was rampant in these US-owned casinos in Cuba. Prostitution and other forms of organized crime, such as drug trafficking, also flourished in and around these establishments. The criminal elements involved in these activities often engaged in bribery, extortion, and other corrupt practices to maintain their operations and evade law enforcement.

By the time Cuba was under the control of dictator Fulgencio Batista between 1952 and 1959, crime and corruption were pervasive in the country. Batista's regime only further exacerbated the problem, being frequently accused of engaging in corrupt practices, including embezzlement and bribery, which further fueled the culture of crime and corruption in Cuba during that period. There are numerous accounts and allegations of corruption, including embezzlement and bribery, against the Batista government during that period. Such practices are said to have contributed to the culture of crime and corruption in Cuba during Batista's rule.

=== Fidel Castro's regime (1959-2008) ===
After Fidel Castro came to power in Cuba in 1959, the country underwent significant changes, including the implementation of socialist policies and the establishment of a communist government. As part of Castro's revolution, there were efforts to eliminate corruption and crime in Cuba.

The new Cuban government implemented measures to crack down on criminal activities, including illegal gambling, drug trafficking, and organized crime. Castro's government nationalized industries, including the hospitality industry, which led to the closure of many US-owned casinos and nightclubs. The Cuban government also implemented social programs aimed at providing education, healthcare, and employment opportunities to the population, with the aim of addressing the underlying social and economic issues that were often associated with crime.

Additionally, the Castro government established a strong security apparatus, including the Ministry of the Interior, which was responsible for law enforcement and maintaining social order. This included the creation of the National Revolutionary Police (Policía Nacional Revolucionaria or PNR), which played a role in combating crime and maintaining public security.

Today, the Cuban criminal justice system is still based on a socialist legal framework with a focus on prevention, rehabilitation, and community involvement. The criminal code emphasizes collective values and social justice over individual rights, with efforts to address the root causes of crime such as poverty and social inequality. The Cuban justice system is highly centralized, with a single prosecutor's office and court system overseeing all criminal cases, and is politicized with the Communist Party exerting significant influence over legal decisions and appointments.

Concerns remain about the lack of due process protections in the Cuban criminal justice system, including limited access to legal representation and the use of pretrial detention to coerce confessions from suspects. Transparency is also lacking, with limited access to information about court proceedings and sentencing decisions.

Overall, crime rates in Cuba have declined significantly since 1959. That being said, crime remains present in various forms in Cuba today. Additionally, the Cuban government's approach to law enforcement has been subject to controversy and criticism, with allegations of political repression and human rights violations. Also, Cuban government's tight control of the media and limits on access to information make it difficult to obtain accurate and unbiased data on crime in Cuba post 1959 and information can vary greatly depending on the source.

=== Post-Fidel Castro era ===
The desperate level of poverty in the 2020s has led to crime committed by people with little or nothing to lose, but also much less to fear than in previous times from the now also impoverished police, according to CNN journalist Patrick Oppmann. As of mid-2026, Oppmann denies the increase in property crime (particularly theft of petroleum-based fuel), has been accompanied by organized crime or a widespread drug problem. Other sources note a problem with drugs and violence. The Cuban Observatory of Citizen Auditing, reported 1,319 crimes between in the first half of 2025, an increase of almost five times the level of crime in 2023. According to the Observatory, there were 721 thefts, including 193 involving the slaughter of livestock, which were attributed to the food crisis; and 63 murders. Contrary to Oppmann's report, it did find incidents of drug trafficking. The Observatory's report also contradicts the Cuban government which maintains the trend in crime is "downward". A September 2024 BBC story quotes a Cuban lamenting that among the young, “almost no-one settles an argument with their fists anymore. It’s all knives, machetes, even guns". The story also reports the aggravating effects among the young of a new cheap chemical high called “quimico”.

==== Organized crime ====
Other sources describe crime a network known as the Cuban Mafia in Quintana Roo as including or protected by members of the government. The mafia is involved outside of the island of Cuba in southwest Florida and Quintana Roo, Mexico -- it has stolen pleasure craft and other marine equipment in Florida and human trafficked of thousands (of Cubans for $10,000 per migrant) from Mexico to the United States -- but is also involved in smuggling stolen goods (outboard boat engines and vessels, and goods bought with stolen credit cards) into Cuba for sale at Cuban government stores.

According to the New York Times, the FBI and Department of Homeland Security investigations task force on the mafia named Raúl G. Rodríguez Castro, a lieutenant colonel of the MININT (Ministry of the Interior) and grandson of retired president of Cuba Raúl Castro, as someone who helped the mafia from inside Cuba. In reply to the article, the Cuban government called accusations involving Rodríguez Castro “slander”.

==== Incarceration rate ====
According to ranking by the Prison Policy Initiative, based on data from 2020, Cuba ranks second in incarceration rate worldwide at 794 per 100,000, among countries who provide data on the issue.

== Crime by type ==
=== Homicide ===
Homicide rates in Cuba are relatively low, with an estimated 4.2 homicides per 100,000 people in 2019. Homicides in Cuba remain quite rare, usually the result of interpersonal disputes or domestic violence. Violent crime in general is relatively low in Cuba compared to other countries, and the government maintains a visible police presence in urban areas.

However, due to limited public access to crime statistics and lack of transparency in the criminal justice system, the exact number of homicides and homicide rate remains in question. Additionally, concerns remain about the effectiveness of the Cuban criminal justice system in addressing violent crime and the limited resources available for victim support services. Victims of violent crime in Cuba, particularly those from marginalized or vulnerable communities, are said to face obstacles in accessing justice and receiving support services, such as lack of resources, limited access to legal representation, language barriers, discrimination, and other socio-economic challenges.

=== Human trafficking ===
Prostitution is illegal in Cuba, yet it remains a part of the economic system, particularly in tourist areas. Many women engage in sex work as a means of survival or to supplement their income, and there are concerns about the exploitation and trafficking of women and girls into the sex industry in Cuba. Cuba is both a source and destination country for human trafficking, including the sex trafficking of both Cuban citizens and foreign nationals.

The Cuban government has taken some steps to address human trafficking, including the enactment of a law in 2014 that criminalizes trafficking and establishes mechanisms for identifying and assisting victims. However, there are concerns about the government's lack of transparency and cooperation with international anti-trafficking efforts, as well as the limited resources available for victim support services. Additionally, the Cuban government has been accused of not fully meeting the minimum standards for the elimination of trafficking.

In 2026, the New York Times accused the Cuban government not of being lacks in enforcing laws against human trafficking, but in participation in it. The newspaper stated an investigation found high level Cuban officials (specifically Raúl G. Rodríguez Castro) were involved in the Cuban Mafia in Quintana Roo which had smuggled thousands of Cubans into the United States, losing the lives of 25 in the process, charging the migrants $10,000 USD for the journey, and beating and torturing those who could not pay.

=== Drug trade ===
The drug trade in Cuba has had a complex history, largely influenced by the country's geographic location in the Caribbean. Cuba's proximity to South and North America has made it a transit point for drug trafficking routes, and its history as a major trading and transportation hub has played a role in the development of the drug trade in the region.

During the 19th and early 20th centuries, Cuba was a major producer and exporter of sugar and tobacco, which were grown on large plantations and required a significant labor force. This created an environment where the drug trade, particularly in the form of smuggling of illegal drugs such as cocaine and marijuana, could thrive due to the ease of transporting goods in and out of the island.

During the 1950s the American mafia and the Corsican mafia partnered in drug trafficking in Cuba. Paul Mondoloni and Floridian mafia boss Santo Trafficante Jr. are reported to have moved between 50 and 150kg of heroin every three to six months from Cuba to the United States. Cuban dictator Batista was paid off $20,000 per week to facilitate this. Previously Trafficante's father Santo Trafficante Sr., had reached his own arrangement with Senator Francisco Prío, brother of Cuban prime minister Carlos Prío Socarrás, and Cuban Senator Indalecio Pertierra, to traffic drugs through Cuba to America.

After the Cuban Revolution in 1959, the Cuban government's shift towards socialism and its strained relationship with the United States led to increased government control over various sectors of the economy, including the drug trade. The Cuban government implemented strict drug laws and crack down on drug trafficking activities, including increasing surveillance at ports, airports, and along the coastline, as well as cooperating with international law enforcement agencies to combat drug trafficking.

Today, Cuba is not a significant producer, consumer, or transit point for illegal drugs. The Cuban government's strict control over its borders and airspace have contributed to a relatively low incidence of drug trafficking activities. The government has also launched public awareness campaigns about the dangers of drug use and has implemented drug treatment programs for individuals struggling with addiction. However, there are occasional reports of drug trafficking through Cuba, often involving small quantities of cocaine or marijuana for local consumption or onward transport to other countries.

=== Domestic violence and femicide ===
Domestic violence is a significant issue in Cuba, with many women experiencing abuse from their partners or family members. Women's rights organizations in Cuba report a high number of cases of domestic violence, with many women experiencing physical, sexual, and psychological abuse from their partners. Limited information is available about the exact prevalence of domestic violence in the country, as the government has historically been hesitant to acknowledge the problem and there is limited research on the issue.

The Cuban government has taken some steps to address domestic violence, including the enactment of a law in 2013 that criminalizes gender-based violence and establishes mechanisms for victims to report abuse and receive support services. There are however concerns about the implementation of the law and the availability of support services for victims, particularly in rural areas.

=== Corruption ===
The 2025 Transparency International Corruption Perceptions Index, rated the country 40 out of 100 in transparency (a decline from earlier ratings), and 84th out of 176 countries, tied with Bulgaria, Burkina Faso and several others. Cuba ranked lower than neighboring states Haiti and the Dominican Republic but higher than Jamaica and the Bahamas in perceived corruption.

The government has made efforts to combat corruption, and there have been instances of capturing corrupt individuals in recent years. In 2019, Cuba passed a new law on the fight against corruption, which includes measures such as the establishment of a National Committee to Prevent and Combat Corruption, the creation of specialized anti-corruption units within law enforcement agencies, and the requirement for public officials to declare their assets.

Also in 2019, the Cuban government launched "Operation Hurricane", a high-profile anti-corruption campaign aimed at tackling corruption within the public sector. The operation resulted in the arrest and prosecution of several high-ranking officials, including the former deputy minister of the Ministry of the Interior and other government officials, on charges of corruption and bribery. In recent years, there have been other cases of removal and prosecution of government officials suspected of corruption. For example, in 2020, the head of the state-run fuel company, CUPET, was removed from his position and prosecuted on corruption charges.

== Activities criminalized under the Castro regime ==
Under Fidel Castro's socialist regime, certain activities that are usually considered legal and / or permissible in democratic countries were subsequently criminalized in Cuba. For example, possessing "anti-revolutionary" materials or engaging in private sector business were made illegal in Cuba even though they would typically be allowed in most democracies, with punishment for these violations varying greatly depending on the severity of the offense as well as the specific laws in place at the time. This reflects the different approach to governance and the legal system in Cuba compared to democratic countries, where the definition of crimes and their corresponding penalties may differ due to the ideological and political context of the country.

Below are a number of such activities that were criminalized under the Fidel Castro regime, and remain criminalized to this day.

=== Political dissent ===
The Castro regime has long suppressed political dissent, criminalizing activities such as organizing or participating in protests, expressing opinions critical of the government, or forming opposition groups. Those who have spoken out against the government or advocated for democratic reforms have faced arrest, imprisonment, and harassment by state security forces, with charges such as "counter-revolutionary activities" or "enemy propaganda" used to silence dissenting voices.

=== Possessing or distributing "anti-revolutionary" materials ===
The Castro regime has criminalized the possession or distribution of materials that are deemed as "anti-revolutionary" or critical of the government, including books, newspapers, or online content. Individuals found with such materials have faced charges such as "spreading enemy propaganda" or "insulting the symbols of the revolution" and have been subject to censorship, confiscation of materials, and even imprisonment.

=== Independent journalism ===
The Castro regime has tightly controlled the media in Cuba, with strict state censorship and control over all forms of communication. Independent journalism that challenges the official government narrative or exposes corruption or human rights abuses has been criminalized, with journalists facing harassment, detention, and imprisonment on trumped-up charges such as "spreading false news" or "subversion against the state."

=== Human rights activism ===
Human rights activists who have sought to document and raise awareness about human rights violations in Cuba, including issues such as arbitrary detentions, lack of freedom of speech and assembly, and mistreatment of prisoners, have faced criminalization and persecution by the Castro regime. Charges such as "disturbing public order" or "inciting subversion" have been used to silence human rights defenders and prevent them from advocating for the protection of human rights.

=== Attempting to leave the country without permission ===
The Castro regime has tightly controlled travel and migration in Cuba, requiring individuals to obtain exit permits from the government to leave the country legally. Those who attempt to leave Cuba without permission, often in search of better economic opportunities or to flee political persecution, have faced criminal charges such as "illegal emigration" or "desertion" and have been subject to punishment, including imprisonment and confiscation of property.

On 11 April 2003, three men were executed by firing squad for hijacking a ferry in Havana Harbor and attempting to reach the United States.

=== Jineterismo ===
In Cuba, jineterismo is a category of illegal or semi-legal economic activities related to tourism in Cuba. It covers a broad range of activities including prostitution and pimping, as well as other forms of hustling, such as selling black-market and counterfeit goods, providing private taxi services and serving as informal tourist guides.

The word derives from the Spanish jinete ("horserider"). Jinetear, meaning "to jockey", refers to the competitive act of riding a horse for economic reward. A male practitioner is a jinetero, a female jinetera. The term jineterismo became widely used in the 1990s as a synonym for prostitution in Cuba, with prostitutes being referred to as jineteras. The United States Department of State defines jineteros as: street "jockeys", who specialize in swindling tourists. Most jineteros speak English and go out of their way to appear friendly, by offering to serve as tour guides or to facilitate the purchase of cheap cigars, for example.

== Law enforcement ==
Law enforcement and crime prevention strategies in Cuba are primarily implemented by the Ministry of Interior (MININT), which is responsible for maintaining public order, ensuring security, and preventing crime in the country. The Cuban government has adopted a multifaceted approach to law enforcement and crime prevention, including both traditional law enforcement methods as well as community-oriented approaches.

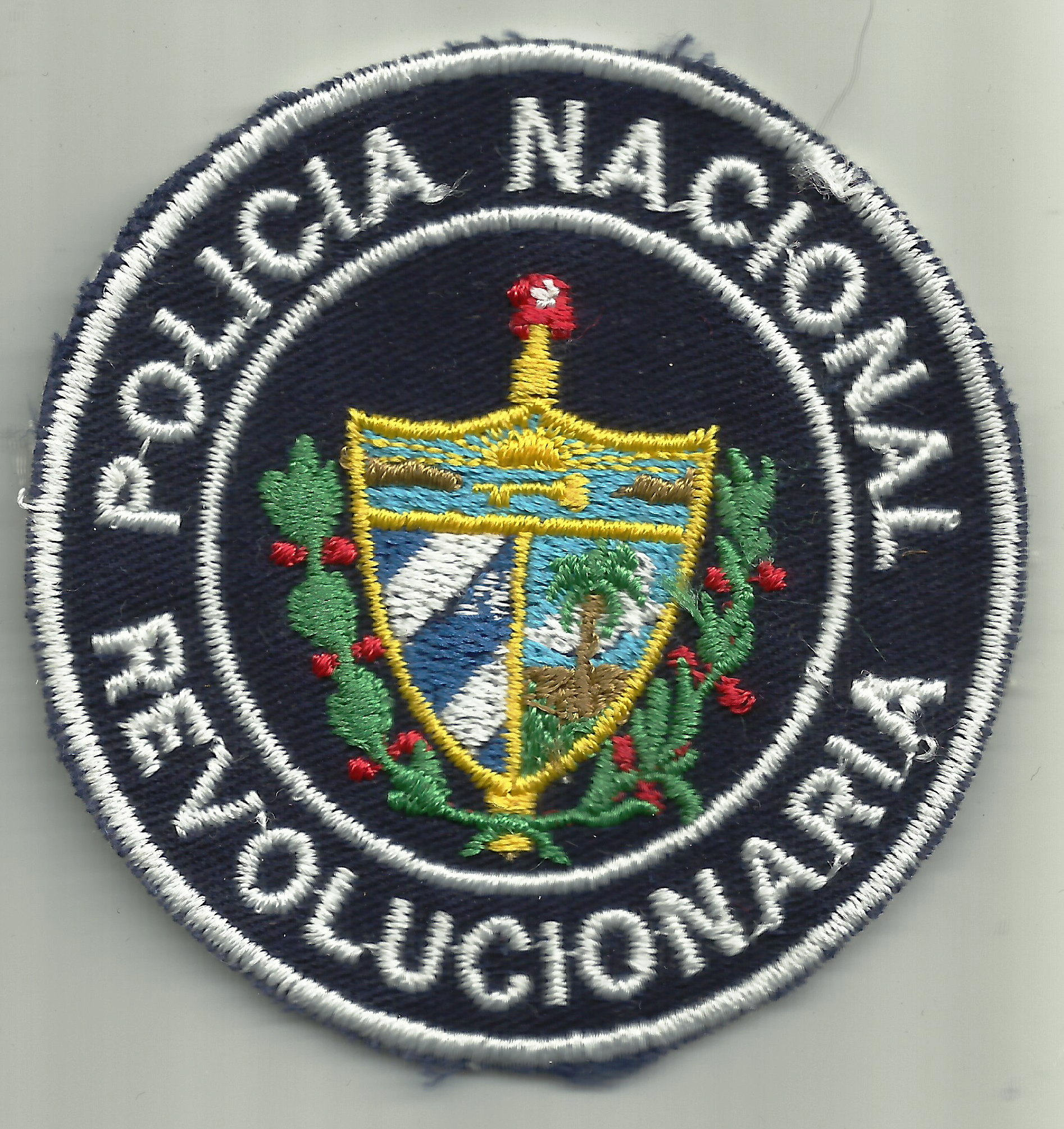
Image of a patch from the National Revolutionary Police (PNR) uniform (November, 2012)

Cuban law enforcement agencies, including the National Revolutionary Police (PNR), play a crucial role in maintaining public order and preventing crime. They are responsible for patrolling the streets, conducting investigations, and enforcing laws to prevent criminal activities. The PNR also works closely with other agencies, such as the intelligence services, to gather information and prevent potential threats to national security.

Cuba emphasizes community-oriented policing, where law enforcement officers work closely with local communities to build trust, establish relationships, and address the root causes of crime. This includes engaging in community outreach programs, building partnerships with community organizations, and involving citizens in crime prevention efforts.

Cuba also places a strong emphasis on education and social programs as crime prevention strategies. These programs aim to address the underlying social and economic factors that contribute to crime, such as poverty, lack of access to education and employment opportunities, and substance abuse. Education and social programs are seen as key components of crime prevention, as they focus on addressing the root causes of criminal behavior and promoting social inclusion. Along the same vein, Cuba emphasizes rehabilitation and reintegration programs for offenders as part of its crime prevention strategy. The country focuses on providing education, vocational training, and psychological support to offenders to help them reintegrate into society and reduce the risk of reoffending.

== Penal codes ==
The penal code in Cuba is a set of laws that outline the legal framework for criminal offenses and their corresponding penalties in the country.

=== 19th century and early 20th century ===
The Penal Code has been in force in Cuba since 1879. The Law of Criminal Procedure has been in force since 1889. In 1900 correctional courts were created for minor offenses and crimes; such cases previously went to various Audiencias for consideration. Penalties included corporal and correctional. The use of the death penalty at the time was described as:

The penalty of death is executed by means of the instrument known as the "garrote." The execution takes place upon a board platform within the walls of the jail, in the day time, within twenty-four hours after notice of the sentence is given; it is held privately and in the presence of those persons who are required to be present and those who are authorized to witness it by the president of the court. The body of the felon remains exposed upon the gallows for four hours, and is then handed over to his relatives for burial, if they request it, and the burial must take place without any pomp. The death penalty will not be executed upon a woman who is pregnant, and she will not be notified of her sentence until forty days have elapsed after her delivery.

In 1889 the military governor of Cuba revoked some of the provisions of the Penal Code of Spain which had applied to Cuba. Some of the changes included that anyone who promoted or took part in any game of chance, except purely for recreation or pastime, should be subject to a fine; and that anyone who bribed a public officer with gifts, presents, offerings, or promises should receive the same punishment as the officer bribed, except for the deprivation of office.

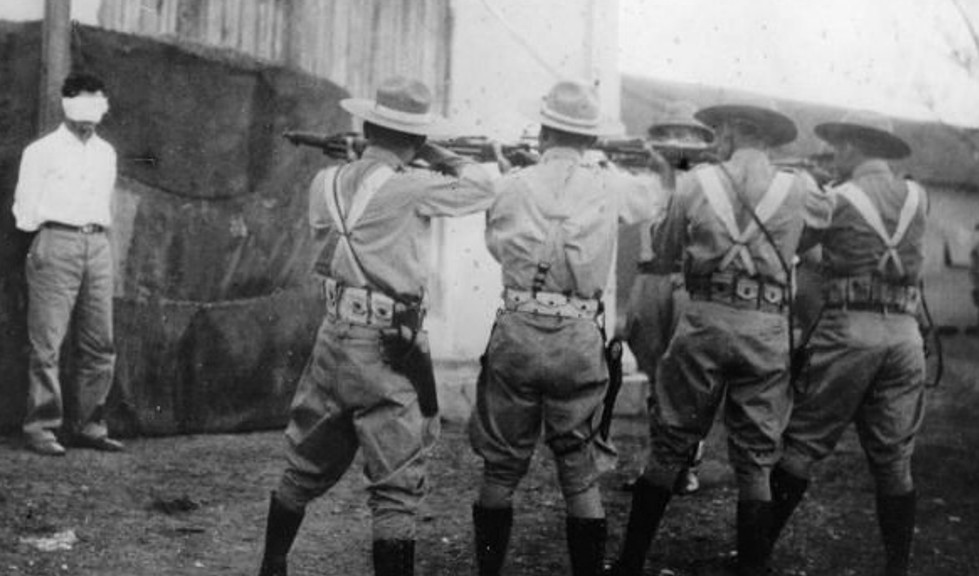
Death by firing squad (1956)

In 1926 Fernando Ortiz led a legal commission to replace the penal code from the era of Spanish regime. Modeled after Cesare Lombroso's work, Ortiz's had a nationalistic mission in which he developed a "scientific crusade against crime", emphasizing social rehabilitation instead of state retribution.

=== Current Penal Code ===
Today, Cuba's legal system is based on socialist principles, and the penal code reflects the country's unique political and social context.

The penal code in Cuba is governed by the 1979 Constitution, replacing the one created in 1936 (the 1936 Social Defense Code). It provides the basic principles for criminal law in the country. According to the new Constitution, Cuba is a socialist state, and the penal code is designed to protect the socialist system, the interests of the state, and the rights of citizens.

The penal code in Cuba classifies offenses into different categories, including crimes against the state, crimes against the person, crimes against property, and crimes against public order. Some of the offenses that are considered crimes against the state include treason, espionage, sabotage, and acts against the integrity and security of the state. Crimes against the person include offenses such as murder, assault, and rape. Crimes against property include theft, robbery, and embezzlement. Crimes against public order include acts that disrupt public order, such as public demonstrations without authorization, and incitement to violence or sedition.

It is also worth noting that, after 1959, many common crimes were reclassified as political crimes. The death penalty was reinstated, and a new criminal offense, illicit enrichment, was created. The age of criminal responsibility was placed at sixteen years.

Penalties for offenses under the penal code in Cuba can range from fines to imprisonment, and in some cases, the death penalty may be imposed. The penal code also includes provisions for rehabilitation and reintegration of offenders into society, with an emphasis on reform and reeducation rather than punitive measures.

Cuba's penal code also recognizes the importance of protecting the rights of the accused, including the right to a fair trial, the right to legal representation, and the presumption of innocence. The penal code also prohibits torture, cruel, inhuman, or degrading treatment or punishment, and guarantees the right to due process and the right to appeal.

In addition to the penal code, Cuba also has laws and regulations that govern other aspects of the criminal justice system, such as law enforcement procedures, the role of the judiciary, and the rights of victims. The penal code is regularly updated and amended to reflect changes in society, and it is enforced by the Ministry of Justice, the National Revolutionary Police, and other law enforcement agencies in Cuba.

== See also ==
- Fidel Castro
- Communist Party
- Cuban Revolution
- Law enforcement in Cuba
