= Rugby union in Cuba =

Rugby union in Cuba is a minor sport.

== Governing body ==
The Cuban Rugby Union is the governing body for rugby union in the Cuba. It was founded in 1996.

== History ==
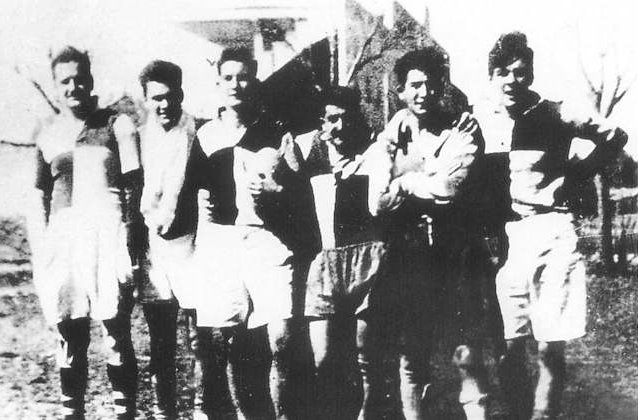
Che Guevara (first on the right) with an Argentine rugby team, c. 1948.

Rugby was played by famous Argentinian revolutionaries Alberto Granado and Che Guevara. After meeting through the game and going on to tour South America (see The Motorcycle Diaries) the pair would settle in Cuba and become national heroes. Alberto Granado later became Cuban's Rugby first Patron and helped develop the sport in the Country where it had not been traditionally played.

During the 1990s and first decade of this century Rugby slowly developed with the involvement of several touring teams from foreign countries such as Canada and France. These teams helped to provide both coaching and much needed equipment. With no olympic support at this time, Cuban rugby had no financial backing from the government with teams often playing under precarious conditions with no changing rooms, goal posts and even no markings on the pitch.

In 2002 the Cuban Rugby Union organized the Cuban Rugby Championship for the first time, with both a 15 a side and sevens tournament.

=== First IRB Sanctioned Tournament ===
In 2010 Havana hosted an 8-team International Rugby Sevens tournament, the first IRB sanctioned tournament to be performed in the country. The tournament was a big success, receiving coverage from the national press—introducing many Cubans to the sport who previously knew nothing of the game. The Cuban national team beat Mexico, showing a big improvement in playing standards on the Island but then lost to a US select side named Atlantis 0-15. The tournament also featured 3 Cuban development sides.

As of 2010 Cuban rugby is still lacking financial backing despite rugby sevens recently being given Olympic status. It is hoped this will change in the future.

In 2016 the first multi-team veterans (over 35s) rugby tournament was played in Cuba. The Copa de Amistad (Friendship Cup) was organised by a small group of Australians led by Rowan Ward, and assisted by Cuban 'rugbyistas' Osmel Hernandez and Leonid Baro, who the Australians had met and befriended in earlier trips to the Caribbean island. Played over 6 days 29 Oct to 4 Nov 2016 the tournament was a big success, with 8 teams participating from Cuba, Australia, USA (California and Colorado), Canada, Chile and Israel. There was also a barbarians team with strong representation from Argentina. The presence of the Israeli team, the Elders of Zion, was reportedly the first sporting team from Israel to tour Cuba in over 50 years. The tournament raised over US$10,000 in funds and materials supporting Cuban youth rugby, a project for adolescents with Down syndrome in Havana (Petalos de Amor) and the introduction of a science-based sustainable development course in universities in central Cuba.

== See also ==
- Cuba national rugby union team
