= List of ecoregions in Cuba =

The following is a list of ecoregions in Cuba as identified by the World Wide Fund for Nature (WWF).

== Terrestrial ecoregions ==
by major habitat type

=== Tropical and subtropical moist broadleaf forests ===
- Cuban moist forests

=== Tropical and subtropical dry broadleaf forests ===
- Cuban dry forests

=== Tropical and subtropical coniferous forests ===
- Cuban pine forests

=== Flooded grasslands and savannas ===
- Cuban wetlands

=== Deserts and xeric shrublands ===
- Cuban cactus scrub

=== Mangroves ===
- Greater Antilles mangroves

== Freshwater ecoregions ==
- Cuba - Cayman Islands

== Marine ecoregions ==
- Greater Antilles
