= Capital punishment in Cuba =

Capital punishment is a legal penalty in Cuba, however it is seldom resorted to. The last executions were carried out in 2003. National legislation provides for the death penalty for murder, threatening to commit murder, aggravated rape, terrorism, hijacking, piracy, drug trafficking and manufacturing, espionage, and treason. The typical method is execution by firing squad.

== Overview ==
The 1940 Constitution of Cuba banned capital punishment for peacetime offenses, but the penalty was officially reinstated by law as well as in practice following the Cuban Revolution, in 1959. The number of people executed remains uncertain, with most estimates around 5,000, but some sources suggest the number to be as high as 49,000. The last death sentences were officially commuted in December 2010.

The last recorded executions were on April 11, 2003. The case concerned three men who were found guilty of having hijacked a Regla ferry. The hijack occurred on April 4, 2003; during the incident, the plaintiffs were alleged to have threatened to kill passengers, demanding sufficient fuel to travel to the United States.

In 2010, the sentences of all remaining death row inmates in Cuba were commuted. The last person to have their death sentence commuted was Humberto Eladio Real, who killed a man during an attempted insurgency raid in 1994. His sentence was reduced to 30 years in prison in December 2010. To date, no further death sentences have been handed out.

== See also ==
- Crime in Cuba
- Law of Cuba
