= Qing (philosophy) =

In Chinese philosophy, qing (Chinese: 情; pinyin: qíng) is a concept translated variously as "emotion", "feeling", "sentiment", or "passion".

== In Confucianism ==
In Confucian thought, qing is interpreted as the behavioural quality of a person given their context, which may be bettered through the cultivation of ren (humaneness), li (ritual propriety), and yi (righteousness) to build de, or virtuous moral character. Confucian scholars, such as Han Yu, traditionally identified seven basic emotions (七情 qīqíng), named in the Book of Rites as happiness (喜), anger (怒), grief (哀), fear (懼), love (愛), hate (惡), and desire (欲).

Neo-Confucians understand qing as products of environmental circumstances affecting xing, or innate human nature. This interpretation of qing as an emotional concept, especially as connected to xing, arose after the Warring States period.

== In Daoism ==
Daoist teaching aims to free a person from the passions (qing), as articulated by Zhuang Zhou: “[The sage] has the shape of a man, but without qing”. (Zhuangzi ch.5)

== In Korea ==
In Korea, qing is known as jeong (정). It is a term familiar to all Korean people and appears frequently in print and media.

Writing in the Korea Times, scholar and cultural critic David Tizzard describes jeong as an "invisible hug" and says that it often manifests in acts of service and gift-giving among people: "In Korea, you learn to both give and receive. This might be a set of vitamin drinks, it might be a compliment or it might be the bill at the local barbeque joint. But it's more than money or affection. Here, those actions become a bond: a psychological umbilical cord linking people. This might be jeong."

A clear application of jeong is found in the recommendation of an educator who advises parents how to deal with emotional "meltdowns" in children. The advice follows a five-step sequence:

1 regulate yourself first
2 move closer to your child at their level
3 offer physical connection
4 match their breathing once they are calmer with your proximity
5 stay until child is fully calm; it takes time don’t rush; keep words simple

== See also ==
- Ganqing
- Xin

== Bibliography ==
- Averill, James R.; Sundararajan, Louise (2014). "Passion and qing: Intellectual histories of emotion, West and East". In Pawlik, Kurt; D’Ydewalle, Géry (eds.). Psychological Concepts: An International Historical Perspective. Abingdon, Oxfordshire: Psychology Press. pp. 101–139. doi:10.4324/9781003076384-6. ISBN 9781003076384. S2CID 51824817.
- Ivanhoe, P.J.; Van Norden, B.W., eds. (2001). Readings in Classical Chinese Philosophy (2nd ed.). Indianapolis: Hackett Publishing Co. pp. 389–393.
- Ivanhoe, Philip J. (2015). "The Historical Significance and Contemporary Relevance of the Four-Seven Debate" (PDF). Philosophy East and West. 65 (2): 401–429. doi:10.1353/pew.2015.0029. S2CID 142778304.
- Nelson, Eric S. (2018). "Confucian Relational Hermeneutics, the Emotions, and Ethical Life". In Fairfield, Paul; Geniusas, Saulius (eds.). Relational Hermeneutics: Essays in Comparative Philosophy. London: Bloomsbury. ISBN 9781350077942.
- Theobald, U. (2010). "Chinese Thought and Philosophy: Neo-Confucianism". ChinaKnowledge.de.
