= Rationing in Cuba =

Peacetime food rationing in Cuba

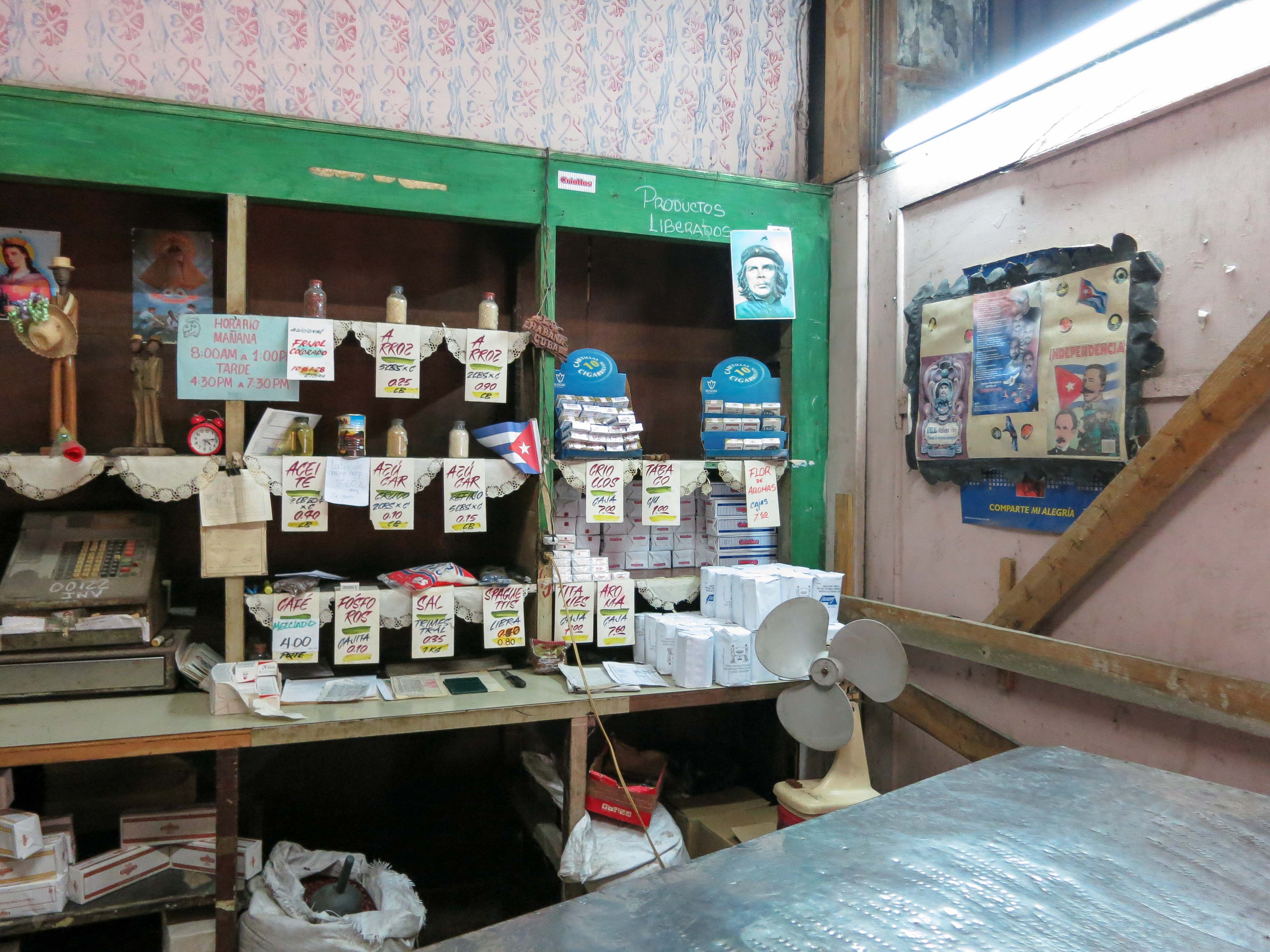
Libreta store in Havana

Rationing in Cuba was implemented in 1962 following the revolution to provide "equitable" distribution of food and some other basic products. A "supplies booklet" (libreta de abastecimiento), was assigned to every Cuban household (núcleo familiar), giving them the right to buy, for a small fraction of the actual cost, a basket of foods such as rice, meats, sugar, dairy products, coffee, tobacco, oil, and beans.

Originally intended to cover almost all food items, by the year 2000 it fulfilled only part of Cubans' dietary needs (food and other goods can also be purchased on the much more expensive free market), and by mid-2024 it provided only a fraction of what it once did, its products often arriving "late, in poor quality or not at all".

The rationing system has been described for years by Cuba's leadership as a "disincentive to work", a "crushing" and "unbearable" burden on the economy, something its leaders were determined to eliminate and that was "gradually being dismantled"; but also as "a hallmark" of the revolution and part of a "sacred covenant" with the ordinary people of Cuba. In 2024 and years following, there has been talk of "dramatic reduction", of disruption, and even of the "definitive" elimination" of the rationing system.

== History ==
Rationing started three years after revolutionaries overthrew the government of Fulgencio Batista. It was officially established by Law No. 1015 on March 12, 1962. Every household was provided with a libreta. The initial rationing plan covered almost all food items, and everyone was eligible for rationing whether or not they could afford to purchase non-rationed food. Administered the program was the Ministry of Internal Trade (MINCIN).

=== Causes ===
Among the factors given as the cause for rationing are:

- shortages resulting from an increase in demand for basics as poor people's purchasing power grew thanks to the revolution's populist policies of cutting other basic expenses such as rent and electricity (José Alvarez);
- a decrease in agricultural production resulting from the drastic changes in "farm ownership and organization" (José Alvarez);
- the need to ensure equitable distribution of basic goods in the wake of the American embargo of Cuba (cibercuba);
- economic mismanagement by the revolutionary socialist regime whose culpability in food shortages was demonstrated by the fact that even while the USSR provided Cuba with billions in subsidies, certain food items still had to be rationed (José Niño).

An estimate of how nutritionally important the rationing was (at least in the year 2000) comes from a study that found that on average, rationed food supplied around 49-61% in the calories, 40-65% of the vegetable proteins of the Cuban diet.

=== Gradual decline ===
The amount of food offered to each citizen has varied over time but decreased over the years. In its heyday rations reportedly provided everything from "hamburgers, fish and milk to chocolate and beer. ... cakes for birthdays and weddings".

Explanations for the decline of food available in rationing include the end of Cold War aid from the Soviet Union in 1991 that created the Special Period; the 2008-2009 global financial crises; the intensification of the US embargo under President Trump in 2019 and blockade in 2026. Rationing also became less essential over time. Holdings of foreign currency and remittances from abroad were legalized in 1993; free agricultural markets were established in 1994. By 2000, there were many self-employed workers and people receiving money from family members abroad. These generally did not need rationing or need it as much, but those who had only low salaries and pensions from the public sector would go hungry without it.

During the Cold War the USSR subsidized Cuba to the tune of $5 billion per year until its collapse in 1991. In the "Special Period" that followed quota amounts dropped and did not return to 1980 levels even ten years later. Rations were reduced to a bare minimum, excluding items like toiletries, cleaning goods and cigarettes. Some items were not supplied when they were due and in the quantities specified; ground meat was mixed with soy, etc.

One example of a rationing cutback was beef. Quotas originally provided 3/4 of a pound of beef weekly; during the 1980s the week became nine days, then 15 days, a month, 45 days, until it was unavailable all together through rationing. In 2009 potatoes and peas were eliminated from the rationing system, and soap, toothpaste and liquid detergents were cut from it in early 2011.

Cuba received major outside economic help again in the 21st century from Venezuela with socialist comradely discounts on oil in return for a variety of technical support. But increased sanctions during the Trump administration and finally a the blockade of the US Trump administration (and also a decline in tourism during and following the pandemic) again created an economic crisis and reduced rations.

In May 2019, Cuba imposed rationing of staples such as chicken, eggs, rice, beans, soap (some two-thirds of food in the country is imported). This was blamed on a harsher U.S. trade embargo, a massive decline of aid from Venezuela, and the mismanagement of Cuba's state-run oil company.

=== Danger of elimination ===
With the most recent crisis there has been talk of cutting back or eliminating rationing. In early 2026 the AP news agency reported that there had been "a dramatic reduction in the availability of rationed food" provided by the Libreta; Cuba-based CNN journalist Patrick Oppmann stated in a June 2026 interview that the implosion of economy meant that in contrast to earlier times, Cubans "don’t get anything through the ration book, hardly"; the Office of the United Nations High Commissioner for Human Rights warned that the fuel shortage in Cuba "has disrupted the rationing system and the regulated basic food basket". There were also reports of the "definitive" elimination of rationing in late 2024 and early 2026. According to the Havana Times, in 2024 eggs, oil, meat, and sugar were reduced or the complete eliminated from the ration quotas, and by the end of the year rice distribution ended and daily bread rolls were reduced by 25%.

== Rationing process ==
As of 2012, a coupon book taken to a ration shop provided family minimums for rice, sugar, matches, and oil, to supplement the average wage of $30/month. As of 2019, the fees averaged less than US$2 for a month of rations, or approximately 12% of their market value, While rent, healthcare, and education are free or heavily subsidized for most Cubans, wages for state employees are very low so that ration fees often take up a higher percentage of their monthly income than it first appears, and the costs of unsubsidized food are quite large in relation to the average monthly income.

The system establishes the rations each person is allowed to buy through the system, and the frequency of supplies. Most of these products are distributed at the local bodega (a food store that can be a convenience store specialized in distributing these rations or a supermarket), or placitas (usually a small outlet for the distribution of fruits and vegetables), and in the case of meat, poultry or fish, at the local carnicería (meat store). Other industrial products are also included in the libreta, such as cigarettes, cigars, matches and cooking fuels (liquified gas, alcohol, kerosene or even charcoal, depending on each person's means for cooking). Other products can also be distributed through this method, such as light bulbs and other home supplies.

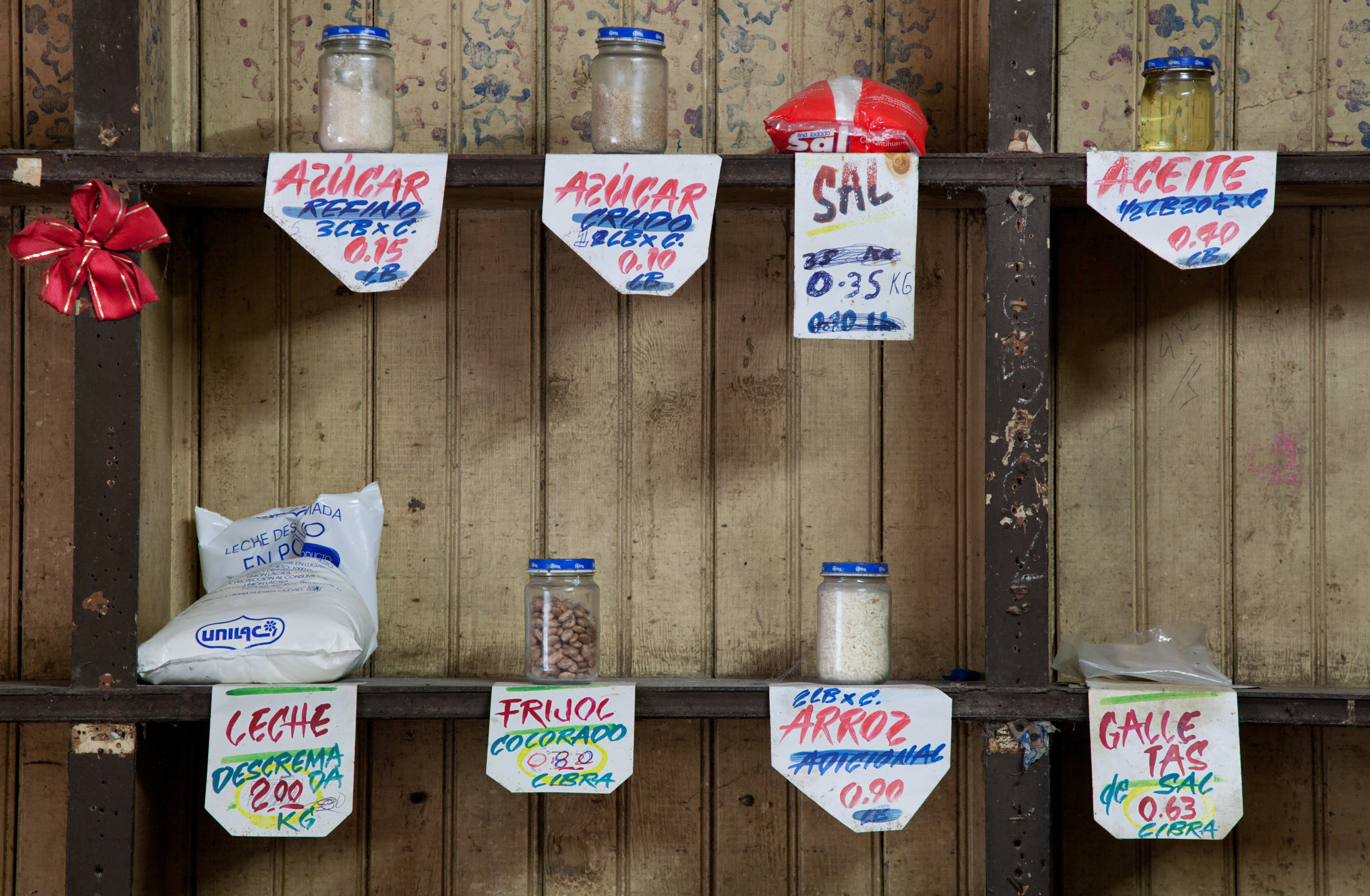
Some products and prices displayed at a bodega (as of January 2011).

A Government office, specially created for this task, the OFICODA, distributes the libreta to all citizens each year, in the form of a small booklet. This booklet contains pages indicating the exact number and age groups of persons composing the family nucleus (typically, one booklet is released per family nucleus), as well as any dietary indications. A person's products are distributed only at the bodega that serves their area of official residence. A person cannot receive their products somewhere else, so each change of address requires returning to the OFICODA to update the booklet's data, and those living away from their registered addresses have to return to the previous area for their supplies.

Products distributed through the libreta mechanism are sold at subsidized prices, which have been kept more or less stable since its inception (the mean salary of a worker has varied very little since, as well). The libreta contains a page for every month, where the clerk marks what products were withdrawn, and in which quantities. Cubans are required to present the libreta each time they buy the rations.

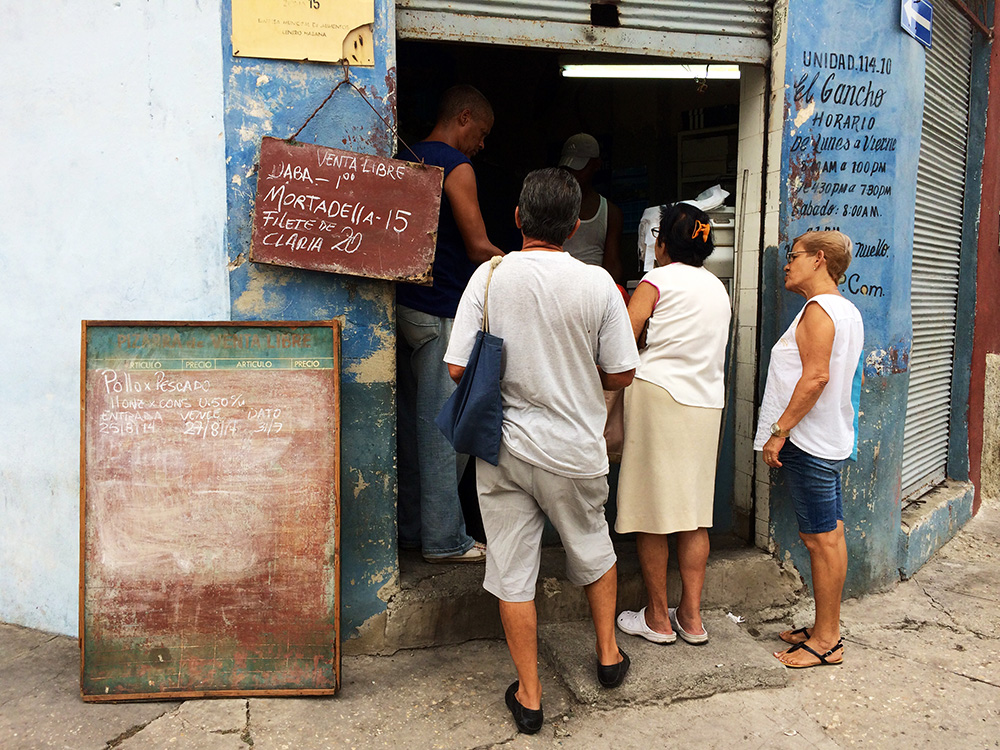
People waiting in line at a libreta store in Havana

At its inception, the rationing system included not only food products, but industrial products as well. Along with the libreta, a tear-off coupon booklet was distributed, whose purpose was to set the allowances for industrial products, mainly clothing, shoes, and home products, as well as rationing the toys sold to families with children (which were allowed 3 different toys per child per year, usually sold near or on 6 January, Three Kings Day, or Día de Reyes). After the demise of the Eastern Bloc in 1991, Cuba entered the "Special Period" and industrial products were no longer distributed through this system.

A specific set of laws regulate the functioning of the system, as well as establishing penalties for its misuse. Most irregularities deal with clerks not recording products in the booklet, or recording them incorrectly, and the weighing of the products distributed. Citizens could be legally liable if they do not promptly inform the local OFICODA of any changes in the composition of the family nucleus.

== Costs ==
The cost of operating the rationing program in annual budget expenditures, "not including control expenditures over wholesale and retail commerce, to ensure compliance with the established regulations", was reported to be 7,000,000 Cuban pesos or $300,000 in 1991.

According to another source, the Vice President of the Council of Ministers, Marino Murillo, (circa 2014) guaranteeing the basic products to the family units costs the Cuban State the equivalent of US $1.16 billion a year, plus the additional expenses of transportation and other logistics. Murillo states that the Government has assumed 88% of the cost of the rationed goods and the population another 12%.

== Variation in rationing ==
Items provided also have varied according to what is in short supply. Some fruits and/or vegetables have been taken out of the ration basket and sold freely (por la libre) as their production has increased, and then returned to the ration booklet when they become scarce again. Eggs in particular have been moved in and out of the libreta.

Products included in the libreta vary according to age and sex. For example, children below 7 years old are provided 1 litre of milk per day, as are the elderly, the ill, and pregnant women. Adults above 65 years are entitled to different allowances, as well. Granting a special diet requires presentation of a medical certificate which confirms the health condition and what product requirements this condition has. These special diets sometimes call for items such as meat, milk, tubers and fish, and are sometimes prescribed by unscrupulous doctors for unworthy recipients in exchange for a bribe.

== Standard rations ==
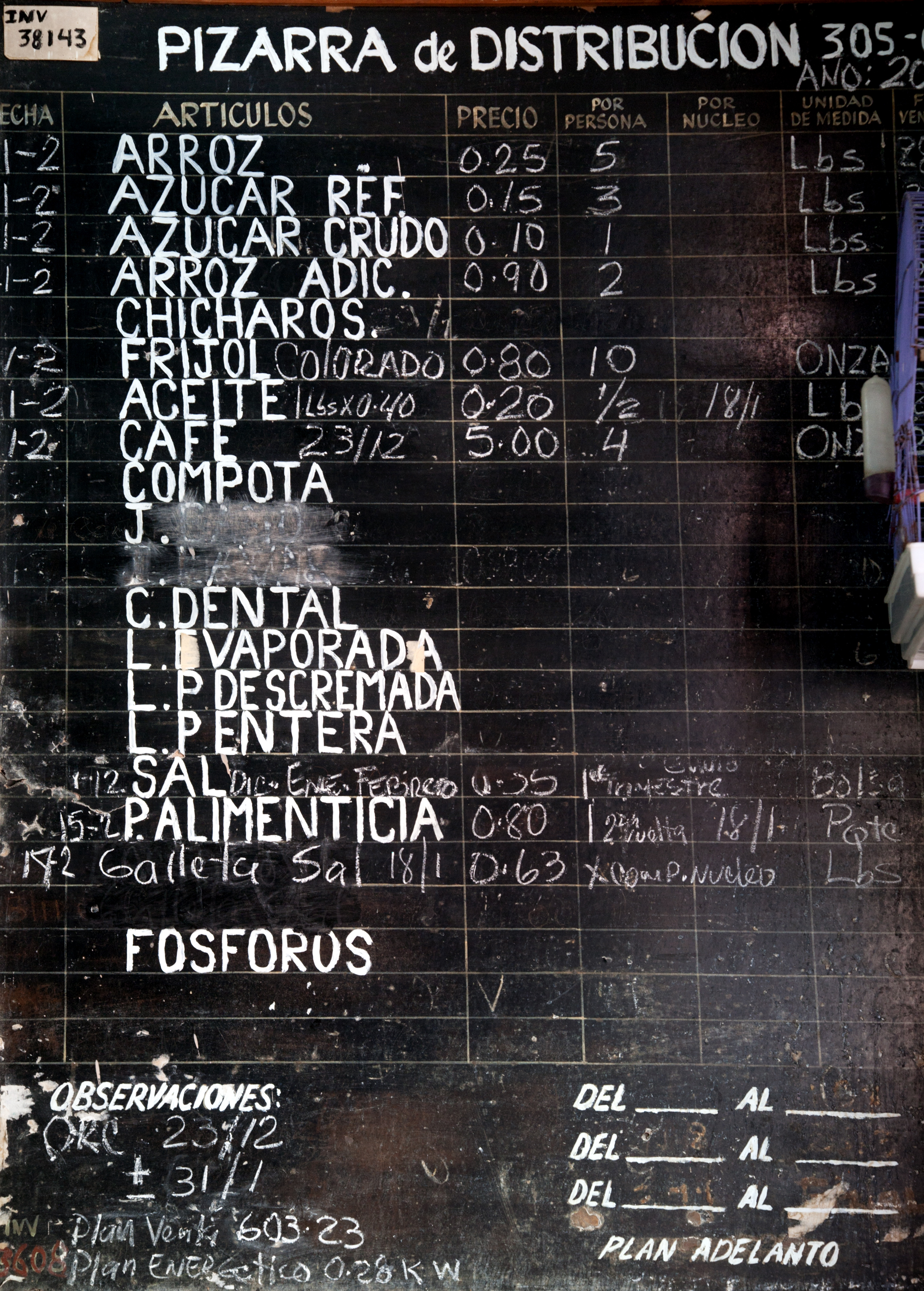
Distribution blackboard displaying the products, prices and limits (as of January 2011).

The table below illustrates the standard ration distributed through this system in 2000 (allowances vary from year to year). Figures are per person, per month. An indication of the subsidized prices is given, as well.

Product	Quantity	Price (CUP)
Rice	6 pounds (2.7 kg)	0.70 / lb
Beans	20 ounces (570 g)	0.32 / lb
White (refined) sugar	3 pounds (1.4 kg)	0.15 / lb
Dark (unrefined) sugar	3 pounds (1.4 kg)	0.10 / lb
Milk (only children under 7 years)	1 lt / day	0.25 / each
Eggs (*)	12	0.15 each
Potatoes/bananas	15 pounds (6.8 kg)	0.40 / lb
(*) Only from September through December.

It must be said that distribution is not always prompt, and product delivery is frequently delayed (for example, if one month there were no beans to distribute, they usually cumulate for next month, although this is not always the case). Such delays are most evident in beef distribution. The fact that products are not available at the bodega always, but arrive in a more or less random manner, creates long queues when products arrive, which sometimes makes buying the products a quite lengthy process. So, this required a mechanism to be invented so that people with special needs, such as old persons and pregnant women, had precedence on the queue. This mechanism became known as Plan Jaba. Jaba is a word for a flexible basket or bag taken from the vocabulary of Neo-Taino nations and originally was made of dried woven strips from palm fronds.

== Sources outside rationing ==
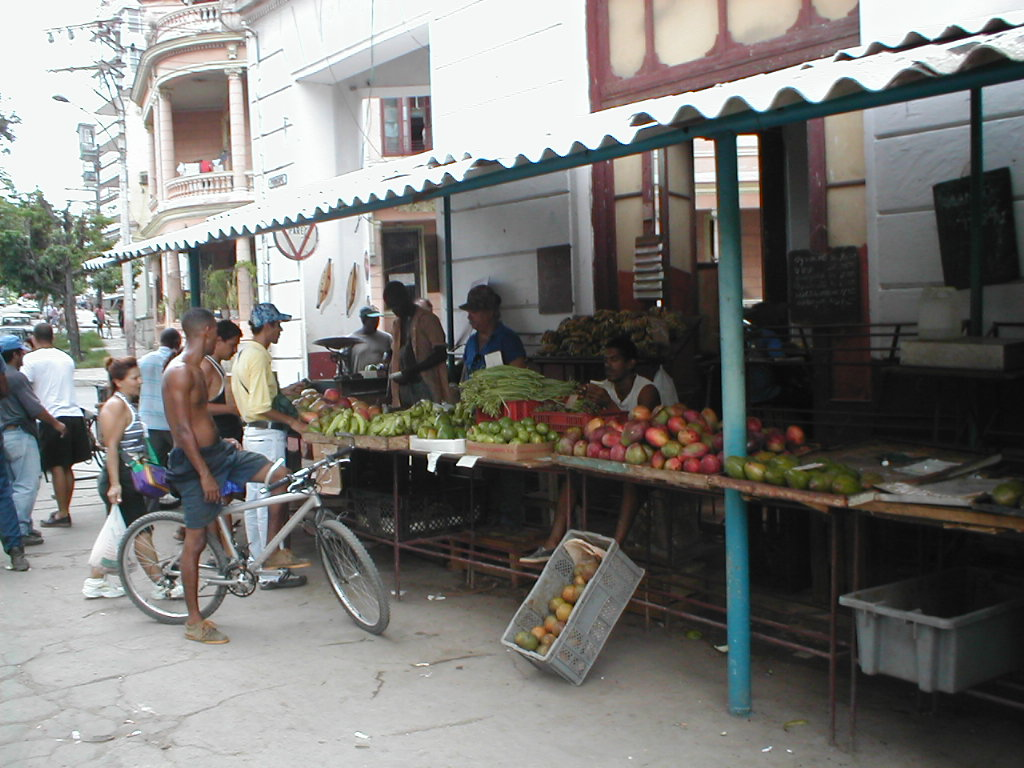
A Havana market, October 2002 - one of the other sources of goods.

Cubans generally acquired foods in "five basic ways" as of 2011, according to Hanna Garth. Besides government food rations (libreta), food comes from

- gifts and trades, sometimes called sociolismo;
- black market purchases (mercado negro, often described as por la izquierda – by the left hand, often consisting of goods stolen from the hospitality industry),
- purchases using the standard non-convertible peso, and
- purchases using convertible currency (CUC).

In 1993, the Cuban government legalized use of foreign currency by Cuban nationals, (previously the possession of hard currency was a punishable crime); Cuba operated on a dual U.S. dollar–Cuban peso economy until 2004 when dollars ceased to be accepted and the Convertible Cuban Peso (CUC or Chavitos) began to be circulated.

Many goods are freely available on the mercado libre (free market) and mercado paralelo (parallel market), and in the numerous supermarkets and stores that sell goods in convertible pesos (CUC). (Such stores were originally set up taking United States Dollars and were referred to as "dollar stores". They began catering for foreign visitors but many are used mainly by Cubans). . Black market goods may be simply items sold by unlicensed vendors (for example, fish caught and sold directly, or home-made items), or may be stolen goods. Many Cubans rely upon connections and barter, or "sociolismo", to obtain the items they need.

== Rationale and criticism ==
=== Government justification for the rationing ===
The Cuban government states this method of distribution serves to ensure each citizen a minimum intake of food, regardless of the person's social and economical status, and has publicized plans for its demise (although specific dates have not been provided). It also stresses that the libreta is not the only means of acquiring goods available to a Cuban citizen, as these and other products are freely available on the mercado libre and mercado paralelo, and of course in the numerous supermarkets and stores that sell goods in convertible pesos or euros. The prices in the ration book are about 20 times lower than the free market. It says as well that humanitarian aid received from other countries is distributed through this method in a fair and equitable manner. The official stance on this subject is that of being undesirable, but unavoidable and fair.

The government also says that rations are not used for political leverage, and distributes the subsidized food equally to all citizens, regardless of their political views or judicial status. However residents and refugees from Cuba report that their rationing books were taken away when they were perceived to be anti-revolutionary.

=== Government criticism of rationing ===
President Raúl Castro said in 2011 that the subsidies are far too costly for the Cuban government, involving more than $1 billion USD in food subsidies every year, and that he would like to eliminate the system and its "unbearable burden for the economy" which he claimed produces "a disincentive to work". These remarks were received very negatively among Cubans, and Castro eventually reversed his proposal. He has also called rationing "paternalistic, irrational and unsustainable". Some two-thirds of food in the country is imported.

== See also ==
- Rationing
- Rationing in the Soviet Union
- Rationing in the United Kingdom
- Economy of Cuba
- Cuban Cuisine
- Culture of Cuba
- Sociolismo
