= Chinese social relations =

Chinese social relations are typified by a reciprocal social network. Often social obligations within the network are characterized in familial terms. The individual link within the social network is known by guanxi (关系/關係) and the feeling within the link is known by the term ganqing (感情). An important concept within Chinese social relations is the concept of face, as in many other Asian cultures. A Buddhist-related concept is yuanfen (缘分/緣分).

As articulated in the sociological works of leading Chinese academic Fei Xiaotong, the Chinese—in contrast to other societies—tend to see social relations in terms of networks rather than boxes. Hence, people are perceived as being "near" or "far" rather than "in" or "out".

== See also ==
- Culture of China
  - Chinese tea culture
  - Kowtow
  - Red envelope
  - Chinese marriage
  - Sifu
