= Sociolismo =

Cuban term for reciprocal favors

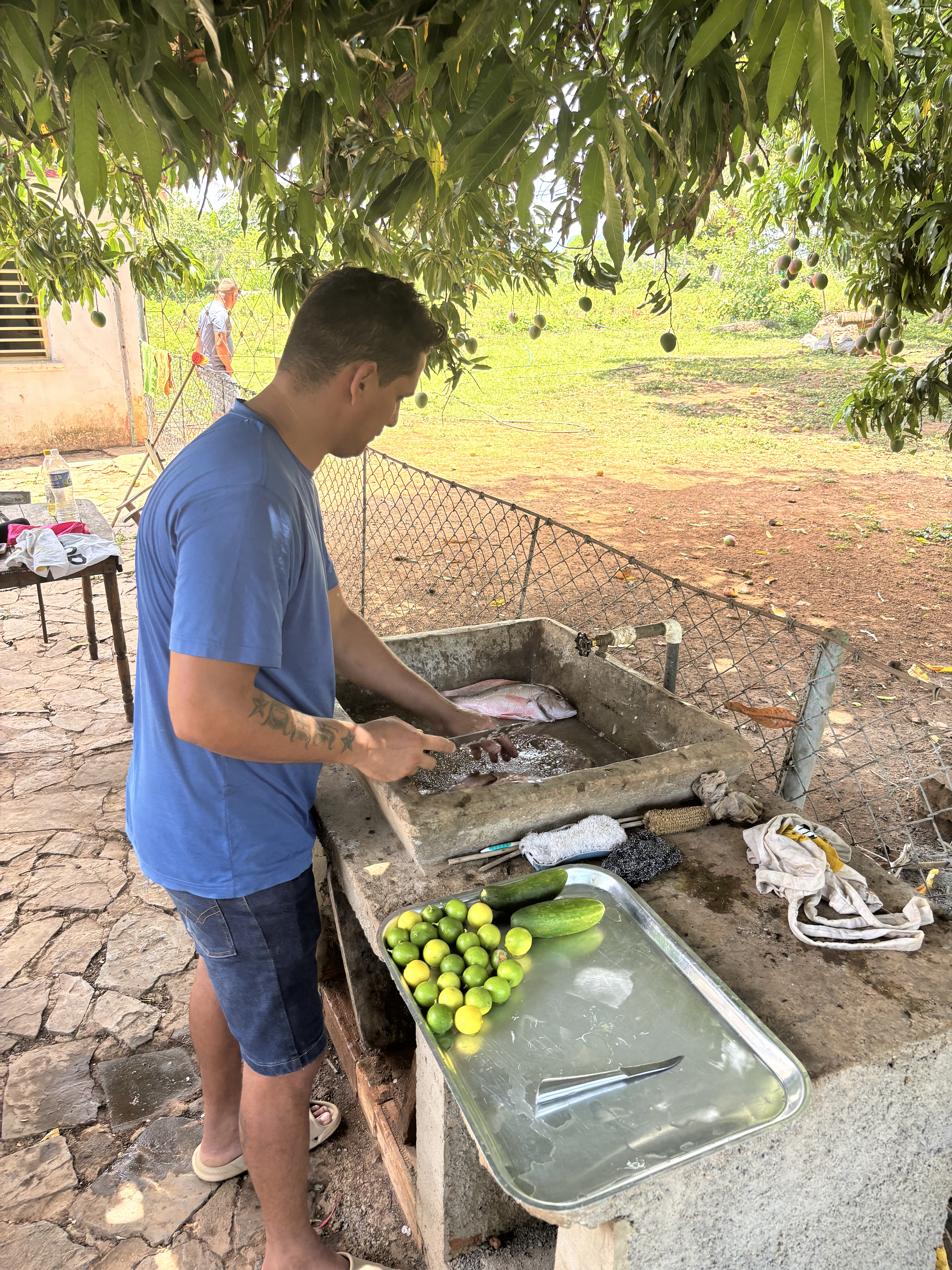
A resident of Puerto Esperanza, Cuba preparing food for others, in June 2025

Sociolismo ("partner-ism"), also known as amiguismo ("friend-ism"), is the informal term used in Cuba to describe the reciprocal exchange of favors by individuals, usually relating to circumventing bureaucratic restrictions or obtaining hard-to-find goods.

== Overview ==
It comes from the Spanish word socio which means business partner or buddy, and is a pun on the official government policy of socialismo (socialism). It is analogous to the blat of the Soviet Union or the term combina in Israel. It is a form of corruption in Cuba.

The term is particularly associated with the black market economy, and perceived cronyism in Cuba's state controlled command economy. Socios can be black market operators who "facilitate" (steal) goods that are officially reserved for the state. They can also get someone a job or obtain paperwork.

The system is used by anyone who needs to send an e-mail or print a resume but does not have a computer, or needs paint or cement but has no access to an Office Store or Home Improvement Store. Gary Marx, the Chicago Tribune's Havana correspondent, reports the system works this way: Cubans send out signals they need something, make telephone calls and visit neighbors and friends to find the right person who can get things in motion.

Few people own cars and the buses, or camellos, are slow and overcrowded; many Cubans spend hours each day arranging rides to get to work, school or accomplish a task. People often must reach out and secure what they need por fuera ("through the outside") or por la izquierda ("through the left"), slang terms that mean "outside the official system".

The system has different levels and obligations. Friends, neighbors and relatives do favors for each other without expecting anything in return. But with lesser-known acquaintances, exchange is more normal for such things as shampoo, a piece of chicken, fruit, or cash.

Sometimes the favors extend to hundreds of people. Employees of a state company in Pinar del Río were given special treatment at a local hospital in exchange for paper, pens and other scarce materials and services.

"Sociolismo" lets any person with control over some resource exchange access to the resource for some current or future personal material benefit. Complex networks of reciprocal obligations thus became an important part of the functioning of the Cuban economy.

Daily life involves maintaining the personal relationships necessary to ensure access to necessary goods and services, through unofficial channels, or through official channels but by unofficial means. Though the term became prominent during the economic downturn known as the Special Period in Cuba, usage has continued into the mid-2000s.

Aspects of Cuban sociolismo were exported to the United States via Cuban immigrants, who relied on friends and relatives in their new country for help in finding jobs, since they were not able to verify their skills or employment in Cuba. This was particularly prevalent in the largest Cuban-American community, in Florida.

== See also ==
- Economy of Cuba
- Rationing in Cuba
- Informal economy
- Compadrazgo (similar phenomenon in Latin America in general)
- Blat (similar phenomenon in Russia)
- Guanxi (similar phenomenon in China)
- System D (a similar concept of informality from European French).
