= Salt lists =

American Civil War rationing system

During the American Civil War, the Union blockade interrupted the normal sources of salt for the Confederate states. Georgia, Alabama and other southern states began a rationing process to ensure fair distribution. Many of the states handed rationing responsibility to the county courts, which created salt lists of eligible families and the amounts of salt (calculated in 1/2 bushels) that they could receive.

The rationing programs did not provide the salt for free, except for widows of soldiers. Other families were required to pay, although families of serving soldiers and widowed mothers of soldiers were given special consideration.
