= Guanxi =

Chinese term for relationship networks

- Traditional Chinese: 關係
- Simplified Chinese: 关系
Transcriptions
Standard Mandarin
- Hanyu Pinyin: guānxi
- Bopomofo: ㄍㄨㄢ ㄒㄧ˙
- Wade–Giles: kuan-hsi
- IPA: [kwán.ɕi]
Yue: Cantonese
- Yale Romanization: gwāan haih
- Jyutping: gwaan1 hai6
Southern Min
- Hokkien POJ: koan-hē

Guanxi (simplified Chinese: 关系; traditional Chinese: 關係; pinyin: guānxì) is a term used in Chinese culture to describe an individual's social network of mutually beneficial personal and business relationships. The character guan, 关, means "closed" and "caring", while the character xi 系 means "system", and together the term refers to a closed caring system of relationships that is somewhat analogous to the term old boy's network in the West. In Western media, the pinyin romanization guanxi is more widely used than common translations such as "connections" or "relationships" because those terms do not capture the significance of a person's guanxi to most personal and business dealings in China. Unlike in the West, guanxi relationships are almost never established purely through formal meetings but must also include spending time to get to know each other during tea sessions, dinner banquets, or other personal meetings. Essentially, guanxi requires a personal bond before any business relationship can develop. As a result, guanxi relationships are often more tightly bound than relationships in Western personal social networks. Guanxi has a major influence on the management of businesses based in mainland China, Hong Kong, and those owned by Overseas Chinese people in Southeast Asia (the bamboo network).

Guanxi networks are grounded in Confucian doctrine about the proper structure of family, hierarchical, and friendly relationships in a community, including the need for implicit mutual commitments, reciprocity, and trust. Guanxi is also related to the idea of "face" (面子, miànzi/mien-tzu), which refers to social status, propriety, prestige, or a combination of all three. Other related concepts include wulun (Chinese: 五倫; pinyin: wǔlún), the five cardinal types of relationships, which supports the idea of a long-term, developing relationship between a business and its client, and yi-ren and ren, which respectively support reciprocity and empathy.

== History ==
The guanxi system developed in imperial, dynastic China. Historically, China lacked a strong rule of law and the government did not hold every citizen subject to the law. As a result, the law did not provide the same legal protection as it did in the West. Chinese people developed guanxi along with the concept of face and personal reputation to help ensure trust between each other in business and personal matters. Today, the power of guanxi resides primarily within the Chinese Communist Party (CCP).

== Description and usage ==
Guanxi refers to connections among individuals involving implicit expectations of loyalty, obligation, and mutual commitment. The concept includes both formal and informal on-going relationships. These relationships include both peer relationships and hierarchal relationships.

Guanxi has three sub-dimensions, sometimes abbreviated as GRX, which stands for ganqing, a measure of the emotional attachment in a relationship, renqing (人情 rénqíng/jen-ch'ing), the moral obligation to maintain a relationship with reciprocal exchange of favors, and xinren (信任 xìnrèn/hsin-jen), or the amount of interpersonal trust.

=== In a personal context ===
Guanxi also refers to the benefits gained from social connections and usually extends from extended family, school friends, workmates and members of standard clubs or organizations. It is customary for Chinese people to cultivate an intricate web of guanxi relationships, which may expand in a huge number of directions, and includes lifelong relationships. Staying in contact with members of your network is not necessary to bind reciprocal obligations. Reciprocal favors are the key factor to maintaining one's guanxi web. At the same time failure to reciprocate is considered an unforgivable offense (that is, the more one asks of someone, the more one owes them). Guanxi can perpetuate a never-ending cycle of favors.

The term is not generally used to describe interpersonal relationships within a family, although guanxi obligations can sometimes be described in terms of an extended family. Essentially, familial relations are the core of one's interpersonal relations, while the various non-familial interpersonal relations are modifications or extensions of familial relations. Chinese culture's emphasis on familial relations informs guanxi as well, making it such that both familial relations and non-familial interpersonal relations are grounded by similar behavioral norms. An individual may view and interact with other individuals in a way that is similar to their viewing of and interactions with family members; through guanxi, a relationship between two friends can be likened by each friend to being a pseudo elder sibling–younger sibling relationship, with each friend acting accordingly based on that relationship (the friend who sees himself as the "younger sibling" will show more deference to the friend who is the "older sibling"). Guanxi is also based on concepts like loyalty, dedication, reciprocity, and trust, which help to develop non-familial interpersonal relations, while mirroring the concept of filial piety, which is used to ground familial relations.

Ultimately, the relationships formed by guanxi are personal and not transferable.

=== In a business context ===
In China, a country where business relations are highly socially embedded, guanxi plays a central role in the shaping and development of day-to-day business transactions by allowing inter-business relationships and relationships between businesses and the government to grow as individuals representing these organizations work with one another. Specifically, in a business context, guanxi occurs through individual interactions first before being applied on a corporate level (e.g., one member of a business may perform a favor for a member of another business because they have interpersonal ties, which helps to facilitate the relationship between the two businesses involved in this interaction). Guanxi also acts as an essential informal governance mechanism, helping leverage Chinese organizations on social and economic platforms. In places in China where factors like the structure of local government and the impact of government policies may make business interactions less efficient to facilitate, guanxi can serve as a way for businesses to circumvent such institutions by having their members cultivate their interpersonal ties.

X. P. Chen and C. C. Chen explore the progress of guanxi development in a business context in three stages: initiating guanxi, building and maintaining it, and then making use of it. Guanxi is important in two domains:

- social ties with managers of suppliers, buyers, competitors, and other business intermediaries; and
- social ties with government officials at various national government-regulated agencies.

In each case, an assessment would ask which of these stages had been reached in a particular business relationship. Given its extensive power in the shaping of business operations, many see guanxi as a crucial source of social capital and a strategic tool for business success.Thanks to knowledge of 'guanxi, companies obtain secret information, increase their knowledge about government regulations, and receive access to stocks and resources.

Guanxi has not always been a guaranteed way of conducting business in China and Southeast Asia, especially for foreigners from the west. During the 1990s, Guanxi was frequently disregarded for American business leaders when dealing with local officials. Knowing this, some economists have warned that Western countries and others that trade regularly with China should improve their "cultural competency" in regards to practices such as guanxi. In doing so, such countries can avoid financial fallout caused by a lack of awareness regarding the way practices like guanxi operate.

The nature of guanxi, however, can also form the basis of patron–client relations. As a result, it creates challenges for businesses whose members are obligated to repay favors to members of other businesses when they cannot sufficiently do so. In following these obligations, businesses may also be forced to act in ways detrimental to their future, and start to over-rely on each other. Members within a business may also start to more frequently discuss information that all members knew prior, rather than try and discuss information only known by select members. If the ties fail between two businesses within an overall network built through guanxi, the other ties comprising the overall network have a chance of failing as well. A guanxi network may also violate bureaucratic norms, leading to corporate corruption.

The link between guanxi and corporate corruption was very strong during the period of American foreign direct investment in the 1990s. Corruption replaced Guanxi in the form of tangible or monetary gifts. Western executives learned about the practice of guanxi during preparatory courses before leading expansions in China. Once leaders were on the ground they often experienced systemic requirements for transactional kickbacks. Securing basic operational needs like construction permits routinely required under the table payments. Furthermore, the reliance on guanxi enabled local political leaders to force foreign firms into hiring specific regional contractors, ensuring that local deputies received direct financial kickbacks from the mandated partnerships.

Note that the aforementioned organizational flaws guanxi creates can be diminished by having more efficient institutions (like open market systems that are regulated by formal organizational procedures while promoting competition and innovation) in place to help facilitate business interactions more effectually.

In East Asian societies, the boundary between business and social lives can sometimes be ambiguous as people tend to rely heavily on their closer relations and friends. This can result in nepotism in the workforce being created through guanxi, as it is common for authoritative figures to draw from family and close ties to fill employment opportunities, instead of assessing talent and suitability. This practice often prevents the most suitably qualified person from being employed for the position. However, guanxi only becomes nepotism when individuals start to value their interpersonal relationships as ways to accomplish their goals over the relationships themselves. When interpersonal relationships are seen in this light, then, it is usually the case that individuals are not viewing their cultivation of prospective business relationships without bias. In addition, guanxi and nepotism are distinct in that the former is inherently a social transaction (considering the emphasis on the actual act of building relationships) and not purely based in financial transactions, while the latter is explicitly based in financial transactions and has a higher chance of resulting in legal consequences. However, cronyism is less obvious and can lead to low-risk sycophancy and empire-building bureaucracy within the internal politics of an organisation.

Guanxi has a bigger impact on leader-subordinate relations in China's state-owned enterprises (SOEs) than in private enterprises. This is because evaluation systems in SOEs are generally more subjective than in private enterprises.

=== In a political context ===
For relationship-based networks such as guanxi, reputation plays an important role in shaping interpersonal and political relations. As a result, the government is still the most important stakeholder, despite China's recent efforts to minimise government involvement. Key government officials wield the authority to choose political associates and allies, approve projects, allocate resources, and distribute finances. Thus, it is especially crucial for international companies to develop harmonious personal relationships with government officials. In addition to holding major legislative power, the Chinese government owns vital resources including land, banks, and major media networks and wields major influence over other stakeholders. Thus, it is important to maintain good relations with the central government in order for a business to maintain guanxi. However, the issue of guanxi as a form of government corruption has been raised into question over recent years. This is often the case when businesspeople interpret guanxi's reciprocal obligations as unethical gift-giving in exchange for government approval. The line drawn between ethical and unethical reciprocal obligation is unclear, but China is currently looking into understanding the structural problems inherent in the guanxi system.

=== In a diasporic context ===
Guanxi can be used as a school of thought that influences how ethnic Chinese think of and view society. The Chinese in the diaspora are more likely to adhere and connect to the group of people with shared background. Moreover, diasporic communities might possess ties with individuals in their home country. Guanxi allows the diaspora to maintain their networks and foster close relations with people in their home country and form a subethnic enclave within society. Guanxi could also influence how the diaspora assimilates into the host country, and how the diaspora deals with racism in society. Groups that could be studied are Chinese-Americans, Chinese-Indonesians who have faced prejudice in their host countries. Marred by the Los Angeles massacre in 1871, Saigu in 1992, the Japanese American internment during World War II, and the idea of the "Hindu Invasion", the Asian Americans already in the United States faced discrimination from the wider American society. They had to find solutions based on trial and error, looking for legal, political, and social ways to find their place in society.

== Ethical concerns ==
In recent years, the ethical consequences of guanxi have been brought into question. While guanxi can bring benefits to people directly within the guanxi network, it also has the potential to bring harm to individuals, societies and nations when misused or abused. For example, mutual reciprocal obligation is a major component of guanxi. However, the specific date, time and method are often unspecified. Thus, guanxi can be ethically questionable when one party takes advantage of others' personal favors, without seeking to reciprocate. A common example of unethical reciprocal obligation involves the abuse of business-government relations. In 2013, an official of the CCP criticized government officials for using public funds of over 10,000 yuan for banquets. This totals approximately 48 billion dollars' worth of banquets per year. Guanxi may also allow for interpersonal obligations to take precedence over civic duties.

Guanxi is a neutral word, but the use or practice of guanxi can range from "benign, neutral, to questionable and corrupt". In mainland China, terms like guanxi practice or la guanxi are used to refer to bribery and corruption. Guanxi practice is commonly employed by favour seekers to seek corrupt benefits from power-holders. Guanxi offers an efficient information transmission channel to help guanxi members to identify potential and trustworthy partners; it also offers a safe and secret platform for illegal transactions. Guanxi norms help buyers and sellers of corrupt benefits justify and rationalize their acts. Li's Performing Bribery in China (2011) as well as Wang's The buying and selling of military positions (2016) analyze how guanxi practice works in corrupt exchanges.

This question is especially critical in cross-cultural business partnerships, when Western firms and auditors are operating within Confucian cultures. Western-based managers must exercise caution in determining whether or not their Chinese colleagues and business partners are in fact practicing guanxi. Caution and extra guidance should be taken to ensure that conflict does not occur as a result of misunderstood cultural agreements.

Other studies argue that guanxi is not in fact unethical, but is rather wrongly accused of an act thought unethical in the eyes of those unacquainted with it and Chinese culture. Just as how the Western juridical system is the image of the Western ethical attitudes, it can be said that the Eastern legal system functions similarly. Also, while Westerners might misunderstand guanxi as a form of corruption, the Chinese recognize guanxi as a subset of renqing, which likens the maintenance of interpersonal relationships to a moral obligation. As such, any relevant actions taken to maintain such relationships are recognized as working within ethical constraints.

The term guanxixue (关系学, the 'art' or 'knowledge' of guanxi) is also used to specifically refer to the manipulation and corruption brought about by a selfish and sometimes illegal utilization of guanxi. In turn, guanxixue distinguishes unethical usage of guanxi from the term guanxi itself.

== Guanxi research ==
Guanxi has been a subject of academic interest from both theoretical and empirical perspectives.

== Similar concepts in other cultures ==
Sociologists have linked guanxi with the concept of social capital (it has been described as a Gemeinschaft value structure), and it has been exhaustively described in Western studies of Chinese economic and political behavior.

- Blat in Russian culture
- Shurobadzhanashtina in Bulgarian society
- Wasta in Middle Eastern culture
- Sociolismo in Cuban culture
- Old boy network in Commonwealth, US and Finnish culture
- Dignitas in ancient Roman culture
- Ksharim (literally 'connections') in Israeli culture. Protektsia (from the word 'protection') is the use of ksharim for personal gain or helping another, also known in slang as 'Vitamin P'.
- Enchufe (literally 'plug in' – compare English 'hook up') in Spain, meaning to 'plug' friends or acquaintances 'into' a job or position, especially making use of an unfair advantage over others.
- Compadrazgo in Latin American culture
- Padrino system in the Philippines (basically "godfather" or patron), also known locally as kapit (Filipino word for "to hang on", "to hook on").

=== Western vs. Eastern social business relations ===
The four dimensions for a successful business networking comprise: trust, bonding, mutual relationship, and empathy. Nevertheless, the points of view in which these dimensions are understood and consolidated into business tasks are extensively disparate in the East vs the West.

From the Western point of view, trust is treated as shared unwavering quality, constancy, and correspondence. Instead, from the Eastern point of view, trust is additionally synonymous with obligation, where guanxi is required to be kept up through persistent long haul affiliation and connection. The Chinese system of wulun (the basic norms of guanxi) supports the Eastern attitude, emphasizing that one's fulfillment of one's responsibilities in a given role ensures the smooth functioning of Chinese society. Correspondence is likewise a measurement that is substantially more stressed in the East than in the West. As per Confucianism, every individual is urged to become a yi-ren (exemplary individual) and compensate some help with altogether more than one has gotten. In conclusion, compassion is a measurement that is exceedingly implanted in Eastern business bonds, the significance for dealers and clients to see each other's needs is extremely important. The Confucian understanding of ren, which also equates to "Do not do to others as one does not want others to do to him", stresses the importance for sellers and customers to understand each other's needs.

Cross-cultural differences in its usage also distinguish Western relationship marketing from Chinese guanxi. Unlike Western relationship marketing, where networking plays a more surface-level impersonal role in shaping larger business relations, guanxi plays a much more central and personal role in shaping social business relations. Chinese culture borrows much of its practices from Confucianism, which emphasizes collectivism and long-term personal relations. Likewise, guanxi functions within Chinese culture and directly reflects the values and behaviors expressed in Chinese business relations. For example, reciprocal obligation plays an intricate role in maintaining harmonious business relations. It is expected that both sides not only stay friendly with each other, but also reciprocate a favor given by the other party. Western relationship marketing, on the other hand, is much more formally constructed, in which no social obligation and further exchanges of favors are expected. Thus, long-term personal relations are more emphasized in Chinese guanxi practice than in Western relationship marketing.

== See also ==
- Blat (similar phenomenon in Russia)
- Sociolismo (similar phenomenon in Cuba)
- Compadrazgo (similar phenomenon in Latin America)
- Ubuntu philosophy (similar phenomenon in Africa)
- System D (similar concept of informality from European French)
- Bamboo network
- Chinese social relations
- Ganqing
- Mianzi
- Social capital
- Social network
- Xenia (Greek), an ancient Greek concept
