= Consumer goods in the Soviet Union =

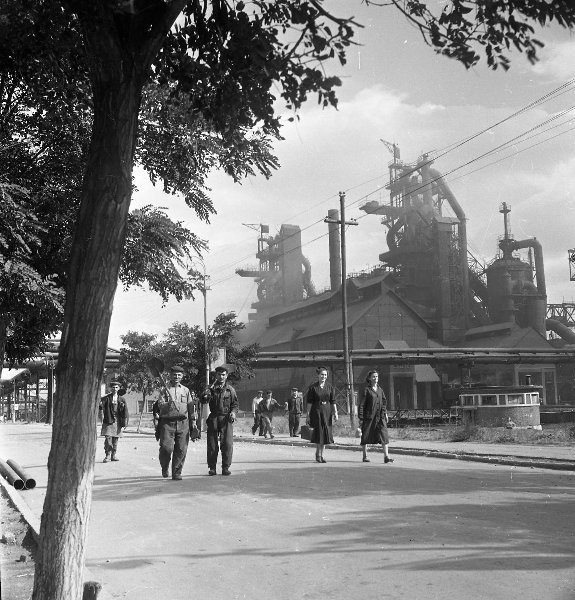
A factory in Rustavi in Soviet Georgia in 1957.

Consumer goods in the Soviet Union were usually produced by a two-category industry. Group A was "heavy industry", which included all goods that serve as an input required for the production of some other, final good. Group B was "consumer goods", final goods used for consumption, which included food, clothing and shoes, housing, and such heavy-industry products as appliances and fuels that are used by individual consumers. From the early days of the Stalin era, Group A received top priority in economic planning and allocation so as to industrialize the Soviet Union from its previous agricultural economy.

== Consumer industry and Soviet economic development ==
Following the October Revolution of 1917, the economy of the Soviet Union, previously largely agrarian, was rapidly industrialized. From 1928 to 1991 the entire course of the economy was guided by a series of ambitious five-year plans (see Economic planning in the Soviet Union). The nation was among the world's three top manufacturers of a large number of basic and heavy industrial products, but it tended to lag behind in the output of light industrial production and consumer durables. One result of this was that consumer demand was only partially satisfied.

== Consumer goods in the early Stalin years (1930s) ==
=== Introduction of consumer goods ===
The 1930s saw major changes in the supply and distribution of consumer goods in the Soviet Union. The first five-year plan focused on the industrialization of the country and the production of industrial goods. After the successful industrialization drive in the first five-year plan, the government turned its focus to improving the lives of its citizens. The introduction of the second five-year plan in 1933 attempted to accomplish this by shifting the focus of production exclusively from industrial goods to include the production of some consumer goods. The Party Congress of February 1934 bolstered the calls for improvement of both quantity and quality in food products and other consumer goods. These changes led Stalin to declare in 1935 that "Life has become more joyous".

To a Soviet consumer, a luxury item was any good with the exception of plain breads, cabbage, potatoes and vodka. By granting all citizens access to a larger variety of consumer goods, views of consumer goods shifted from representative of the elite, and therefore despised, to being desired by all citizens. This shift in opinion and perception fit into the main Marxist–Leninist goal of empowering the proletariat. The Soviet government looked to teach Soviet citizens about Marxist–Leninist ideology along with table manners and discerning taste in food and material goods. Bolsheviks were expected to be cultured and mannered. Being able to discuss luxury goods with comrades was an important social skill.

The government used consumer items as legitimate awards to honor comrades whose work contributed to the building of socialism. However, the culturalization of society legitimized the formerly despised bourgeois concerns about status and possession, and the practice of giving special goods to a subset of the population also created a new social hierarchy which received special privileges.

=== Distribution and supply ===
In the early 1930s, the closed distribution system was the primary method of consumer goods distribution. By 1933, two thirds of Moscow's population and 58 percent of Leningrad's population were served by these stores. The closed distribution system consisted of stores and cafeterias accessible only to workers registered at that enterprise. These centers distributed rationed goods. The system was set up to protect the workers from the worst effects of limited supply and shortages. It also linked the rationing system with employment.

At the same time, there were three other legal alternatives to closed distribution stores: commercial stores, Torgsin stores and Kolkhoz markets. All had higher prices than the closed distribution stores. Since the state controlled all of these distribution methods, it could exercise a distribution monopoly.

The first five-year plan caused the closure of all artisan methods of consumer goods production, such as small private factories and workshops. In the mid-1930s, these methods of production were allowed to return on a small scale. In May 1936, a law was passed that slightly improved the supply of consumer goods by legalizing individual practice of trades such as cobbling, cabinetmaking, carpentry, dressmaking, hairdressing, laundering, locksmithing, photography, plumbing, tailoring, and upholstery – it slightly improved the shortage of consumer goods. Artisanal activity related to food was still banned. Kolkhoz markets were set up for artisans and peasants to sell their homemade goods. The State regulated the amount of participation in these markets but prices were allowed to float. This floating caused the prices at these markets to normally be higher than prices in the closed distribution stores. Individual service was illegal until May 1936.

The State also set up Torgsin stores that sold scarce goods in exchange for foreign currency, gold, silver, and other valuables. The purpose of these stores was to expand Soviet hard currency reserves so that the country could import more equipment for the industrialization drive. Since these goods were scarce, consumers viewed them as treasure and selling them was a huge sacrifice. Prices were kept low to entice people to participate in the Torgsin stores. These stores ran from 1930 to 1936.

From 1929, the State ran commercial stores that functioned outside the rationing system. Goods were sold for higher prices than in the closed distribution stores, two to four times as much. The goods sold were regarded as higher quality than goods sold by the closed distribution stores.

At the end of 1933, the first department store, called the Central Department Store, opened in Moscow. It ran until the fall of the Soviet Union in 1991 as part of the commercial store network. The end of the first rationing period and the abolition of the closed distribution system in 1935 caused the commercial store network to expand. In January 1935, there were five department stores open in the USSR. A year later, fifteen more department stores had opened.

=== Foreign influence ===
The import of foreign goods was extremely limited during the 1930s. The official slogan was "There is much to be learned from the example of the advanced capitalist countries in the field of consumer goods". Small amounts of foreign goods were imported, studied, and then copied. These Soviet versions of foreign consumer goods were distributed through consumption channels. The State did not directly import large quantities of consumer goods.

During the Molotov–Ribbentrop pact period (1939–41), the Soviet citizens' primary interaction with the outside world was with the newly occupied borderlands of Finland, the Baltic States, Bessarabia, and Poland. Goods considered scarce in the USSR such as watches, bicycles, clothes and food products were plentiful in these regions. The occupying Red Army was fascinated with the diversity of goods at low prices. Viewed as a once-in-a-lifetime opportunity to acquire them, soldiers bought large quantities of these goods to send back to their families in the USSR. This flow of goods inspired civilians to seek permission to travel to these areas to acquire the goods and sell them on the black market.

== 1959 American National Exhibition ==
In the summer of 1959 the American National Exhibition was held at Sokolniki Park in Moscow. The American National Exhibition was sponsored by the American government and featured many displays of the latest "home appliances, fashions, television and hi-fi sets, a model house priced to sell [to] an 'average' family, farm equipment, 1959 automobiles, boats, sporting equipment and a children’s playground."

== See also ==
- Economy of the Soviet Union
- Ministry of Light Industry
- Shortage economy
- Soviet fashion design
