= Ganqing =

Ganqing (Chinese: 感情; pinyin: gǎnqíng; Wade–Giles: kan-ch'ing) literally means "feel" (Gǎn, 感) "affection" (Qíng, 情), and together the term is often translated as "feelings" or "emotional attachment". Ganqing refers to a friendship-like feeling that develops between two people, groups, or business partners as their relationship deepens. Ganqing is an important concept in social relations in Chinese culture that has roots in Confucianism, and is a sub-dimension to the concept of guanxi (a person's relationship network). Developing good ganqing is a critical aspect of building guanxi relationships. Good ganqing means that two people have developed a rapport, while deep ganqing means there is a considerable emotional bond within the relationship. Ganqing can also refer as "love affair" in Chinese.

The term ganqing is often used in comments by the government of the People's Republic of China, for example statements that an action "hurts the feelings of the Chinese people" which some people interpret to mean harm the relationship with the Chinese government.
