= Rationing in the Soviet Union =

Rationing in the Soviet Union was introduced twice since its creation, both instances during periods of economical hardships.

== 1931–1935 ==
Food ration cards from Kharkiv, 1931–1932.

In 1931, the Politburo introduced a unified rationing system for foodstuffs and basic commodities and norms of rationing applied throughout the entire USSR. Besides bread, rationing applied to other foodstuffs, including products like sugar, tea, oil, butter, meat, and eggs.

The rationing existed up to 1935, ending in six main stages. Beginning in May 1931, most industrial consumer goods were removed from the rationing system. Then, between March and April 1932, some food items began being removed from the rationing system. From 1932 to 1934, ration prices of foodstuffs and consumer goods were increased. The state also began selling increasing amounts of these goods off the rations at higher prices. At the beginning of 1935, the rationing of bread was abolished, followed by the end of rationing of all foodstuffs in October 1935. Rationing officially came to an end on January 1, 1936 when rationing of all industrial goods was abolished.

Foreign specialists employed in Russia were supplied through a separately established organization Insnab.

== Perestroika ==
The last, 12th Five-Year Plan that fell within the perestroika period ended with uncontrolled economical degradation, resulted in part in various ways of rationing in all Union republics.

=== Rationing of money ===
Perestroika produced a unique type of rationing: rationing of money. In 1990, Byelorussia introduced a "Consumer's Card", which was a paper sheet sectioned into tear-off coupons with various designated monetary values: 20, 75, 100, 200, and 300 roubles. These coupons were required in addition to real money when purchasing certain categories of consumer goods. The coupons had next to no protection and could be easily counterfeited on modern colour copiers. (Copiers were scarce in the Soviet Union and under strict control of KGB, which to an extent limited, but did not eliminate, forging). The coupons were distributed at workplaces together with salary and had to bear the accountant's department stamp and signatures. This was an attempt to protect from profiteering, especially from profiteering by resales abroad.

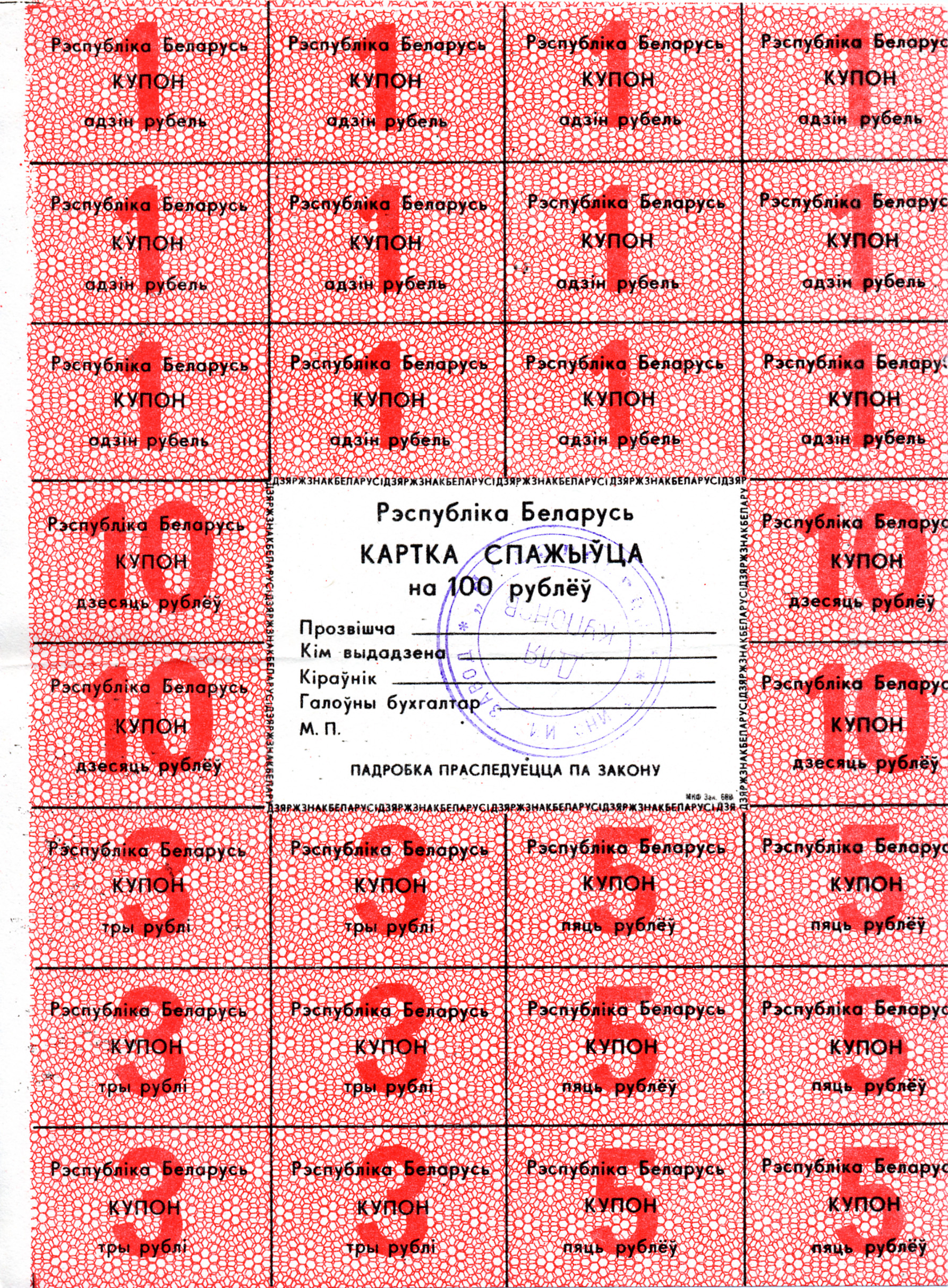
Customer's Card for 100 rubels, 1992.

During that time, coupons or tickets used for buying food and drinks were known as талон (talon, "ticket"). Each talon coupon was available for a certain month, and had a different colour.

== See also ==
- Blat
- Consumer goods in the Soviet Union
- Public grocery stores
