= Healthcare in Cuba =

The Cuban government operates a national health system and assumes fiscal and administrative responsibility for the health care of all its citizens. All healthcare in Cuba is free to Cuban residents. There are no private hospitals or clinics as all health services are government-run.

Like the rest of the Cuban economy, Cuban medical care suffered following the end of Soviet subsidies in 1991. The United States embargo against Cuba also has an effect. Difficulties include low salaries for doctors, poor facilities, poor provision of equipment, and the frequent absence of essential drugs.

The Cuban healthcare system has emphasized the export of health professionals through international missions, aiding global health efforts. However, while these missions generate significant revenue and serve as a tool for political influence, domestically, Cuba faces challenges including medication shortages and disparities between medical services for locals and foreigners. Despite the income from these missions, only a small fraction of the national budget has been allocated to public health, underscoring contrasting priorities within the nation's healthcare strategy.

== History ==
Modern Western medicine has been practiced in Cuba by formally trained physicians since at least the beginning of the 19th century and the first surgical clinic was established in 1823. Cuba has had many world-class doctors, including Carlos Finlay, whose mosquito-based theory of yellow fever transmission was given its final proof under the direction of Walter Reed, James Carroll, and Aristides Agramonte. During the period of U.S. presence (1898–1902) yellow fever was essentially eliminated due to the efforts of Clara Maass and surgeon Jesse William Lazear.

In the 1950s the number of doctors per thousand of the population ranked above Britain, France and the Netherlands. In Latin America it ranked in third place after Uruguay and Argentina. There remained marked inequalities, however. Most of Cuba's doctors were based in the relatively prosperous cities and regional towns, and conditions in rural areas, notably Oriente, were significantly worse. The mortality rate was the third lowest in the world. According to the World Health Organization, the island had the lowest infant mortality rate of Latin America.

Following the Revolution and the subsequent United States embargo against Cuba, an increase in disease and infant mortality worsened in the 1960s. The new Cuban government stated that universal healthcare would become a priority of state planning. In 1960 revolutionary and physician Che Guevara outlined his aims for the future of Cuban healthcare in an essay entitled On Revolutionary Medicine, stating: "The work that today is entrusted to the Ministry of Health and similar organizations is to provide public health services for the greatest possible number of persons, institute a program of preventive medicine, and orient the public to the performance of hygienic practices." These aims were hampered almost immediately by an exodus of almost half of Cuba's physicians to the United States, leaving the country with only 3,000 doctors and 16 professors in the University of Havana's medical college. Beginning in 1960, the Ministry of Public Health began a program of nationalization and regionalization of medical services. In 1965, Cuba became the first Latin American country to legalize abortion.

In 1976, Cuba's healthcare program was enshrined in Article 50 of the revised Cuban constitution which states "Everybody has the right to health protection and care. The State guarantees this right:

- by providing free medical and hospital care by means of the installations of the rural medical service network, polyclinics, hospitals and preventive and specialist treatment centers;
- by providing free dental care;
- by promoting the health publicity campaigns, health education, regular medical examinations, general vaccinations and other measures to prevent the outbreak of disease. All of the population cooperates in these activities and plans through the social and mass organizations." Privatization of healthcare in Cuba is illegal and unnecessary as high quality, equal, care covered by the state is available to everyone as made necessary by Cuba's constitution.

Cuba's doctor to patient ratio grew significantly in the latter half of the 20th century, from 9.2 doctors per 10,000 inhabitants in 1958, to 58.2 per 10,000 in 1999. In the 1960s the government implemented a program of almost universal vaccinations. This helped eradicate many contagious diseases including polio, tetanus, diphtheria and rubella, though some diseases increased during the period of economic hardship of the 1990s, such as tuberculosis, hepatitis and chicken pox. Other campaigns included a program to reduce the infant mortality rate in 1970 directed at maternal and prenatal care. As of 2012, infant mortality in Cuba had fallen to 4.83 deaths per 1,000 live births compared with 6.0 for the United States and just behind Canada with 4.8. Some experts have said that these statistics may reflect heavy-handed treatment of pregnant patients. Tassie Katherine Hirschfeld, an associate professor at the department of anthropology of the University of Oklahoma, said that doctors have incentives to falsify statistics, as a spike in infant mortality may cost them their jobs. She also said pregnant women may be pressured to undergo abortions if fetal abnormalities are detected or forcibly placed under monitoring if complications arise. Hirschfeld said Cuba does not allow for independent verification of its health data.

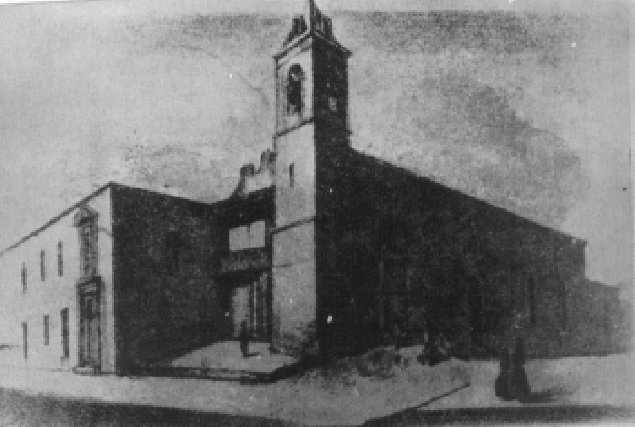
The Hospital de San Felipe in Havana (in 1900), a healthcare educational facility built by the religious order San Juan de Dios in the mid-19th century

=== Post-Soviet Union ===
Loss of Soviet subsidies brought food shortages to Cuba in the early 1990s. The famine during the Special Period was caused by an authoritarian regime that denied people the food to which they were entitled when the public food distribution collapsed; priority was given to the elite classes and the military. The Cuban government began accepting US donations of food, medicines and cash in 1993. It established a system of private farmers' markets in 1994 to provide citizens with easy access to locally grown food.

Epidemiologist Manuel Franco describes the Special Period as "the first, and probably the only, natural experiment, born of unfortunate circumstances, where large effects on diabetes, cardiovascular disease and all-cause mortality have been related to sustained population-wide weight loss as a result of increased physical activity and reduced caloric intake".

In 2007, Cuba announced that it has undertaken computerizing and creating national networks in blood banks, nephrology and medical images. Cuba is the second country in the world with such a product, only preceded by France. Cuba is preparing a computerized health register, hospital management system, primary health care, academic affairs, medical genetic projects, neurosciences, and educational software. The aim is to maintain quality health service free for the Cuban people, increase exchange among experts and boost research-development projects. An important link in wiring process is to guarantee access to Cuba's Data Transmission Network and Health Website (INFOMED) to all units and workers of the national health system.

=== United States embargo ===
During the 1990s the ongoing United States embargo against Cuba caused problems due to restrictions on the export of medicines from the US to Cuba. In 1992 the US embargo was made more stringent with the passage of the Cuban Democracy Act resulting in all U.S. subsidiary trade, including trade in food and medicines, being prohibited. The legislation did not state that Cuba cannot purchase medicines from U.S. companies or their foreign subsidiaries; however, such license requests have been routinely denied. In 1995 the Inter-American Commission on Human Rights of the Organization of American States informed the U.S. Government that such activities violate international law and has requested that the U.S. take immediate steps to exempt medicine from the embargo. The Lancet and the British Medical Journal also condemned the embargo in the 90s.

The embargo forced Cuba to use more of its limited resources on medical imports, both because equipment and drugs from foreign subsidiaries of U.S. firms or from non-U.S.sources tend to be higher priced and because shipping costs are greater. The Democracy Act of 1992 further exacerbated the problems in Cuba's medical system. It prohibited foreign subsidiaries of U.S. corporations from selling to Cuba, thus further limiting Cuba's access to medicine and equipment, and raising prices. In addition, the act forbid ships that dock in Cuban ports from docking in U.S. ports for six months. This drastically restricted shipping, and increased shipping costs some 30%.

In 1997, the American Association for World Health stated that the embargo contributed to malnutrition, poor water access, lack of access to medicine and other medical supplies and concluded that "a humanitarian catastrophe has been averted only because the Cuban government has maintained a high level of budgetary support for a health care system designed to deliver primary and preventative medicine to all its citizens."

In 2000, the Trade Sanctions Reform and Export Enhancement Act was passed. The US became Cuba's single largest source for imported food. The Cuban American National Foundation (CANF) states that should Cuba choose not to purchase from the U.S., it can purchase any medicine or medical equipment it needs from other countries. Such third-country transactions only cost an estimated 2%–3% more than purchases from the U.S. as a result of higher shipping costs. CANF also asserts the United States is the largest donor of humanitarian assistance to Cuba and much of this consists of medicines and medical equipment.

The US government states that since 1992, 36 out of 39 license requests from U.S. companies and their subsidiaries for sales of medical items to Cuba have been approved. The dollar amount of these sales is over $1,600,000. Furthermore, the U.S. government licensed more than $227 million in humanitarian donations of medicines and medical supplies to Cuba between 1993 and 1997. There are other factors beside the embargo explaining the lack of imports, in particular Cuba's lack of hard currency. Those with dollars can easily buy medicines and food in Cuba from Latin America and Canada. Cuba defaulted on its debt to Western banks in 1986 and lacks access to the international credit system in order to get foreign currency. In addition, the collapse of the Soviet Union caused the loss of several billions of dollars in yearly subsidies and overnight required hard currency for all imports.

In a 2006 report to the U.N. Secretary-General, Cuba acknowledged the authorization of medicines, though stated that they were subject to severe restrictions and complicated procedures. Cuba is obliged to make payments in cash and in advance, and is precluded from obtaining credit funding, even from private sources. The sale and transportation of the goods require licenses to be obtained for each transaction. Cuba cannot use its own merchant fleet for transporting these goods, but has to make use of vessels from third countries, primarily the United States. Payments are made through banks in third countries, since direct banking relationships are prohibited. The Cuban delegation concluded that restrictions on importing medical products were "so extensive that they make such imports virtually impossible". The World Health organization/PAHO and UNFPA concurred that it was impossible for Cuba to purchase equipment, medicines and laboratory materials produced by the United States or covered by United States patents, even though those products were purchased through multilateral cooperation. Cuba was not able to purchase the isotope I-125 that is used to treat eye cancer in children. The companies manufacturing reagents and equipment are 70 per cent United States owned, which makes it difficult to purchase necessary medical equipment and other items.

One effect of the embargo has been to make it necessary for Cuba to create its own biotech industry to produce drugs which it is unable to access. One of its innovations is the drug CimaVax, which is used to treat lung cancer. While the embargo forbids US citizens from seeking medical treatment in Cuba, some cancer patients from the US have defied the embargo and travelled to Cuba for treatment with CimaVax.

Life expectancy in Cuba

Historical life expectancy in Cuba
Years	1900	1910	1920	1930	1940	1950	1960	1970	1980	1990	2000	2010
Cuba	33.2	35.3	37.4	41.5	47.5	55.8	63.9	69.8	73.8	74.6	76.6	78.9
Increase per decade		2.1	2.1	4.1	6.0	8.3	8.1	5.9	4.0	0.8	2.0	2.3
Latin America							56.0	60.4	64.2	67.7	71.5	74.0
Difference with L.A.							7.9	9.4	9.6	6.9	5.1	4.9

== Present ==
=== National health system ===
Cuba's national health system is made up of multiple tiers: 1) the community containing individuals and families, 2) family doctor-and-nurse teams, 3) basic work teams, 4) community polyclinics, 5) hospitals, and 6) medical institutes. There are also hospitals that specifically serve the armed forces.

Cuba's Family Physician and Nurse program is made up of physician and nurse teams that serve individuals, families, and their communities. They live above their government-built family medicine offices, living directly in the communities they serve and available 24 hours a day. These teams work to improve the public health concerns in the environment as well as provide medical care. They perform a neighborhood health diagnosis biannually where community risk factors are evaluated to focus priorities for improving the health of the community. Clinically, family doctor-and-nurse teams follow the Continuous Assessment and Risk Evaluation (CARE) method which monitors individual and family health by examining community and home environments, current health, and medical history. The teams make home visits to each family at least once yearly to assess and evaluate their health. Individuals with chronic illness are seen at least every three months. These teams' role combine the importance of focusing on both public health and clinical medicine.

Cuba created a national family doctor program in charge of primary care in 1986. Polyclinics are community-based clinics that house primary care specialists. They exist in every Cuban community and are well-acquainted with the people and the communities they serve. They can see the social determinants and environment that affect the community's health, bettering their ability to serve their patients. Specialists at the polyclinic are there to support physicians when they are needed. Each clinic of specialists supports 20-40 doctor-and-nurse teams. Basic work teams within the polyclinics supervise and evaluate the neighborhood and clinical health work of the family medicine offices.

While preventive medical care, diagnostic tests and medication for hospitalized patients are free, some aspects of healthcare are paid for by the patient. Items which are paid by patients who can afford it are: drugs prescribed on an outpatient basis, hearing, dental, and orthopedic processes, wheelchairs and crutches. When a patient can obtain these items at state stores, prices tend to be low as these items are subsidized by the state. For patients on a low-income, these items are free of charge.

The Cuban health system has been promoted for decades by the government as an international role model due to its free access and broad coverage. However, in practice, there are reports indicating issues such as the deterioration of hospital facilities and the need for patients to provide basic supplies. Challenges for healthcare in Cuba include low salaries for doctors, poor facilities, poor provision of equipment, and the frequent absence of essential drugs.

In 1963, Cuba established paid leave for sickness and maternity and regulated cash benefits. For salaried workers, the employer pays. For the self-employed, the state budget pays.

In October 2023, the Miami Herald cited "insufficient healthcare" as one of the reasons why nearly 425,000 Cubans had fled the country during the previous two years.

As at 2024, Cuba spends 11.4 per cent of its GDP on healthcare, which is more than twice as much as most Latin American countries, and has nine doctors per thousand residents. Child mortality in 2023 was four per thousand, which is similar to that of rich industrialised countries.

The current public health minister of Cuba is José Angel Portal Miranda.

=== Health statistics ===
Indicators	Statistic	Date of information
Life expectancy at birth	79 (years)	2012
Life expectancy at age 60	22 (years)	2012
Fertility rate	1.4 (children born/woman)	2013
Number of live births	107.1 (thousands)	2013
Maternal mortality ratio	81 (per 100,000 live births)	2013
Under-five mortality rate	6 (deaths/1,000 live births)	2013
Number of deaths	95.9 (thousands)	2013
Deaths due to HIV/AIDS	2.6 (per 100,000 population)	2012
Total health expenditure per capita	2,475 (Intl $)	2014
Total health expenditure as % of GDP	11.1	2014

All statistics from World Health Organization figures.

Cuba had 128 physicians and dentists per 100,000 people in 1957. This was comparable to the levels in many European countries and allegedly the highest in Latin America. In 1986, Cuba had 219 doctors per 100,000 people (compared with 423.7 doctors in the Soviet Union, which had the most doctors among industrialized countries). In 2005, Cuba had 627 physicians and 94 dentists per 100,000 population. That year the United States had 225 physicians and 54 dentists per 100,000 population; the Central American isthmus had 123 physicians and 30 dentists per 100,000. As of 2005, Cuba became the world leader in the ratio of doctors to population with 67 doctors per 10,000 population as compared with 43 in the Russian Federation and 24 in the United States.

Abortion rates, which are high in Cuba, increased dramatically during the 1980s, but had almost halved by 1999 and declined to near-1970s levels of 32.0 per 1000 pregnancies. The rate is still among the highest in Latin America. The abortion rate in Cuba is 72.8 per 100 births.

=== Alternative healthcare ===
Economic constraints and restrictions on medicines have forced the Cuban health system to incorporate alternative and herbal solutions to healthcare issues, which can be more accessible and affordable to a broader population In the 1990s, the Cuban Ministry of Public Health officially recognized natural and traditional medicine and began its integration into the already well established Western medicine model.

=== Sexual health ===
A 2002 report stated that there had been a significant increase in STIs in Cuba due to an increase in prostitution and lack of prevention.

According to the UNAIDS report of 2003 there were an estimated 3,300 Cubans living with HIV/AIDS (approx 0.05% of the population). In the mid-1980s, when little was known about the virus, Cuba compulsorily tested thousands of its citizens for HIV. Those who tested positive were taken to Los Cocos and were not allowed to leave. The policy drew criticism from the United Nations and was discontinued in the 1990s. Since 1996 Cuba began the production of generic anti-retroviral drugs reducing the costs to well below that of developing countries. This has been made possible through the substantial government subsidies to treatment.

In 2003 Cuba had the lowest HIV prevalence in the Americas and one of the lowest in the world. Education in Cuba concerning issues of HIV infection and AIDS is implemented by the Cuban National Center for Sex Education.

According to a 2005 report by UNAIDS and the World Health Organization, "Cuba's epidemic remains by far the smallest in the Caribbean." They add however that,

... new HIV infections are on the rise, and Cuba's preventive measures appear not to be keeping pace with conditions that favour the spread of HIV, including widening income inequalities and a growing sex industry. At the same time, Cuba's prevention of mother-to-child transmission programme remains highly effective. All pregnant women are tested for HIV, and those testing positive receive antiretroviral drugs.

In 2015, Cuba became the first country in the world to eliminate mother-to-child transmission of HIV and syphilis, a major public health accomplishment.

=== Fertility and medical genetics ===
Following the successful 2022 Family Code referendum, surrogacy is legal in Cuba as long as money is not exchanged.

Cuba is the only country in Central and South America where medical genetics is part of the healthcare system and where there are a large number of healthcare workers in this field. In 2023, there were 474 masters-level genetic counsellors and 104 medical geneticists, all of whom work under the National Centre of Medical Genetics of the Ministry of Public Health. However, the number of genetic counsellors approximately halved between 2017 and 2023 due to emigration, retirement from the workforce, and COVID-19 deaths.

== Training doctors ==
Cuba's healthcare system survives, in part, due to its medical education system. In Cuba, the medical university is not a separate entity from health services, but it exists within the system, a model common in the rest of the developing world. In Cuba, this may include more community-based centers than large hospitals. Medical and nursing students mentor and intern within the national system from the first years of their training, specifically within primary care facilities rather than hospitals. This is supposed to create a community-based teaching method rather than a typical hospital-based teaching method. Primary care, being the first level of contact to a patient, is ideally located close to the patient's home and work. At primary care facilities, the Cuban government's ethics and values are mandatorily taught as a key part of the Cuban healthcare system, followed by the science and technology. One of the largest medical universities in the world exists in Cuba, the Latin American School of Medicine.

=== Diet and nutrition in the Cuban household ===
The traditional diet in Cuban households has raised international concerns due to its lack of micronutrients and diversity. According to the World Food Programme (WFP), an entity of the United Nations, the average diet in Cuba lacks adequate nutritional quality. This is attributed to various factors, including limited availability of nutrient-rich foods, socioeconomic issues, and poor dietary habits. The WFP's annual report on Cuba supports previous testimonies and evidence, pointing to a concerning situation. Even though the country has rolled out food subsidy programs, many backed by the WFP, the populace's diet remains nutritionally insufficient. Specifically, rationed food covers only a small percentage of the daily energy, protein, and fat requirements for the population aged 14 to 60.

Such deficiencies have led to health issues like overweight and obesity, largely due to a diet high in sugars and salts. Additionally, there is a significant disparity in accessing proper nutrition. Individuals without access to foreign currencies and remittances are the most affected. The inadequacy of the minimum wage to meet recommended nutritional requirements is another concern highlighted in the report. The political and socioeconomic landscape has influenced this scenario. The implementation of the "Tarea Ordenamiento", an economic reform that removed many food subsidies, has spurred alarming inflation, intensifying the shortage of basic foods like cereals, vegetables, dairy, and meat. As a result, Cuban households spend between 55% and 65% of their income on food, a proportion deemed disproportionate compared to international standards.

Nevertheless, the report acknowledges the Cuban government's efforts in areas like social protection and universal access to basic services. It highlights Cuba's position in the Human Development Report 2021–2022 and the extensive COVID-19 vaccination coverage. To address food security challenges, the WFP has enhanced its collaboration with Cuban authorities. In 2022, the organization procured essential foods and macronutrients worth $10.7 million in response to alarming figures about anemia prevalence in infants.

Amid this nutritional crisis, international interventions and collaborations are anticipated to alleviate the food and nutrition issues plaguing the Cuban populace.

== Cuba and international healthcare ==
Cuba provides more medical personnel to the developing world than all the G8 countries combined. In the 1970s, the Cuban state initiated bilateral service contracts and various money-making strategies. Cuba has entered into agreements with United Nations agencies specializing in health: PAHO/WHO, UNICEF, the United Nations Food and Agriculture Organization (FAO), the United Nations Population Fund (UNFPA) and the United Nations Development Fund (UNDP). Since 1989, this collaboration has played a very important role in that Cuba, in addition to obtaining the benefits of being a member country, has strengthened its relations with institutions of excellence and has been able to disseminate some of its own advances and technologies

Cuban doctors have been part of a large-scale plan by the Cuban state to provide free medical aid and services to the international community (especially third world countries) following natural disasters. Currently dozens of American medical students are trained to assist in these donations at the Escuela Latino Americana de Medicina (ELAM).

Cuba's missions in 68 countries are staffed by 25,000 Cuban doctors. Medical teams have worked in crisis such as the South Asian tsunami and the 2005 Kashmir earthquake. Nearly 2,000 Cuban doctors are currently working in Africa in countries including South Africa, Gambia, Guinea Bissau and Mali. Since the Chernobyl nuclear plant exploded in 1986, more than 20,000 children from Ukraine, Belarus and Russia have traveled to Cuba for treatment of radiation sickness and psychologically based problems associated with the radiation disaster. In response to the 2005 Hurricane Katrina disaster, Castro offered to send a "brigade" of 1,500 doctors to the U.S. to provide humanitarian aid, but the U.S. did not accept.

Cuba currently exports considerable health services and personnel to Venezuela in exchange for subsidized oil. Around 30,000 medical professionals were sent to the country in exchange for more than 100,000 barrels of oil per day. Cuban doctors play a primary role in the Mission Barrio Adentro (Spanish: "Mission Into the Neighborhood") social welfare program established in Venezuela under former Venezuelan president Hugo Chávez.

Through Operación Milagro (in English, "Operation Miracle"), Cuba began in 2004 to pay for Venezuelans with reversible blindness to travel to Cuba for free operations to restore their sight. Over 200,000 Venezuelans received this free surgery. In 2005, Cuba established a new ophthalmology center in Venezuela, and later expanded its program to 30 Venezuelan hospitals. Cuba continued to grow the program and by 2017 had established 69 Operación Milagro clinics in 15 different countries. By 2019, over 4 million people in 34 countries had received free surgery through the program.

Cuba also exports many medical products, such as vaccines.

=== Health tourism ===
Cuba provides medical services to foreigners in exchange for payment. Cuba attracts about 20,000 paying health tourists, generating revenues of around $40 million a year for the Cuban economy. Cuba has been serving health tourists from around the world for more than 20 years. The country operates a special division of hospitals specifically for the treatment of foreigners and diplomats. Foreign patients travel to Cuba for a wide range of treatments including eye-surgery, neurological disorders such as multiple sclerosis and Parkinson's disease, cosmetic surgery, addictions treatment, retinitis pigmentosa and orthopaedics. Most patients are from Latin America, Europe and Canada, and a growing number of Americans are also coming. By 1998, according to the Economic Commission for Latin America and the Caribbean, the Cuban health sector had risen to occupy around 2 percent of total tourism. Some of these revenues are in turn transferred to health care for ordinary Cubans, although the size and importance of these transfers is both unknown and controversial. At one nationally prominent hospital/research institute, hard currency payments by foreigners have financed the construction of a new bathroom in the splenic surgery wing; anecdotal evidence suggests that this pattern is common in Cuban hospitals.

=== Cuban Medical Professional Parole Program ===
President George W. Bush in 2006 initiated a program called the "Cuban Medical Professional Parole Program", this program allowed for any Cuban doctor serving outside of Cuba to be granted political asylum and permanent resident status in the United States, if only the Cuban national was able to make it to a U.S. embassy anywhere in the world. The program was ended by the Obama administration as part of an effort to warm relations between the United States and the Cuban government. 7,117 applications by Cuban doctors working abroad have been approved since 2006.

=== International medical missions ===
The Cuban healthcare system, renowned for the quality of its medical services, has largely strategized its approach around the export of health professionals through international medical missions. These missions have enabled Cuba to establish a medical presence across various regions of the world, especially in areas with healthcare deficiencies. During the COVID-19 pandemic, medical brigades were deployed to 41 territories, spanning nations in Latin America, the Caribbean, Africa, and Europe. Historically, these professionals have conducted millions of operations and have had a substantial impact on global health.

Cuban doctors, accustomed to working under resource-constrained conditions, have been requested to assist in the pandemic response abroad. Yoani Sánchez of 14ymedio wrote in 2020 that there are concerns regarding the working conditions and the distribution of their salaries when they work abroad, as a significant portion is retained by the Cuban government. According to Reason in early 2022, doctors that travel abroad on behalf of the Cuban government often do so against their will and without monetary compensation similar to doctors from other countries. Sánchez wrote that nearly 7,000–8,000 doctors since 2006 have gone into hiding or failed to return to Cuba after having gone on abroad as part of the Cuban government's "volunteering" them to provide healthcare to foreign nationals without remuneration. While Cuban doctors are sent abroad to assist in medical missions, domestically, although wages in the health sector have increased in recent years, they are still considered low compared to the prices of basic goods in Cuba.

The medical missions have also been a subject of critiques and controversies. There are testimonies from professionals indicating human rights violations during their participation in these missions across different countries. These accounts reflect concerns over limitations on fundamental freedoms and the potential instrumentalization of these doctors for political and propagandistic purposes. Although the salary on these missions is higher than what they might earn in Cuba, a significant portion is retained by the Cuban government.

Domestically, the Cuban healthcare system has faced challenges, particularly during the pandemic. The shortage of medications and other essential resources has been a recurring issue, despite Cuba's efforts to develop its own COVID-19 vaccines. Furthermore, there is a notable disparity between the medical service offered to Cuban citizens and the "health tourism" targeted at foreigners, with the latter being of higher quality and enjoying a better international reputation.

The financing and distribution of resources also raise questions about governmental priorities. Despite the revenues generated by the medical missions, only 0.8% of the national budget was allocated to public health in the first half of 2021, compared to 45.5% focused on international tourism and other business activities.

== Medical research ==
The Cuban Ministry of Health produces a number of medical journals including the Acimed, the Cuban Journal of Surgery and the Cuban Journal of Tropical Medicine. MEDICC Review is an English-language journal which works to bring Cuban medical and public health policy, research, programs, and outcomes to the attention of the global health community. Because the U.S. government restricts investments in Cuba by U.S. companies and their affiliates, Cuban institutions have been limited in their ability to enter into research and development partnerships, although exceptions have been made for significant drugs.

In the 1980s, Cuban scientists developed a vaccine against a strain of bacterial meningitis B, which eliminated what had been a serious disease on the island. The Cuban vaccine is used throughout Latin America. After outbreaks of meningitis B in the United States, the U.S. Treasury Department granted a license in 1999 to an American subsidiary of the pharmaceutical company SmithKline Beecham to enter into a deal to develop the vaccine for use in the U.S. and elsewhere.

The Center of molecular immunology (CIM) developed nimotuzumab, a monoclonal antibody used to treat cancer. Nimotuzumab is an inhibitor of epidermal growth factor receptor (EGFR), which is over-expressed in many cancers. Nimotuzumab is now being developed with international partners.

In April 2007, the Cuba IPV Study Collaborative Group reported in the New England Journal of Medicine that inactivated (killed) poliovirus vaccine was effective in vaccinating children in tropical conditions. The Collaborative Group consisted of the Cuban Ministry of Public Health, Kourí Institute, U.S. Centers for Disease Control and Prevention, Pan American Health Organization, and the World Health Organization. This is important because countries with high incidence of polio are now using live oral poliovirus vaccine. When polio is eliminated in a country, they must stop using the live vaccine, because it has a slight risk of reverting to the dangerous form of polio. The collaborative group found that when polio is eliminated in a population, they could safely switch to killed vaccine and be protected from recurrent epidemics. Cuba has been free of polio since 1963, but continues with mass immunization campaigns.

During the COVID-19 pandemic, Cuba developed two COVID-19 vaccines. Soberana 02 is produced by the Pasteur Institute of Iran and the Finlay Institute, a Cuban epidemiological research institute. Abdala was developed by the Center for Genetic Engineering and Biotechnology in Cuba.

== Assessments ==
=== Praise ===
In reviewing five books about Cuba's medical system for Family Medicine magazine, William Ventres concluded that Cuba's state-run medical system has been quite successful, due largely to its family medicine model.

In 2006, BBC flagship news programme Newsnight featured Cuba's healthcare system as part of a series identifying "the world's best public services". The report alleged that "Thanks chiefly to the American economic blockade, but partly also to the web of strange rules and regulations that constrict Cuban life, the economy is in a terrible mess: national income per head is minuscule, and resources are amazingly tight. Healthcare, however, is a top national priority" The report stated that life expectancy and infant mortality rates are nearly the same as the USA's. Its doctor-to-patient ratios stand comparison to any country in Western Europe. Its annual total health spend per head, however, comes in at $251; just over a tenth of the UK's. The report concluded that the population's admirable health is one of the key reasons why Castro is still in power. A 2006 poll carried out by the Gallup Organization's Costa Rican affiliate — Consultoría Interdisciplinaria en Desarrollo (CID) — found that about three-quarters of urban Cubans responded positively to the question "do you have confidence to your country's health care system".

In 2000, Secretary General of the United Nations Kofi Annan stated that "Cuba should be the envy of many other nations" adding that achievements in social development are impressive given the size of its gross domestic product per capita. "Cuba demonstrates how much nations can do with the resources they have if they focus on the right priorities – health, education, and literacy." The Kaiser Family Foundation, a non-governmental organization that evaluated Cuba's healthcare system in 2000-1 described Cuba as "a shining example of the power of public health to transform the health of an entire country by a commitment to prevention and by careful management of its medical resources" President of the World Bank James Wolfensohn also praised Cuba's healthcare system in 2001, saying that "Cuba has done a great job on education and health", at the annual meeting of the Bank and the International Monetary Fund. Wayne Smith, former head of the US Interests Section in Havana identified "the incredible dedication" of Cubans to healthcare, adding that "Doctors in Cuba can make more driving cabs and working in hotels, but they don't. They're just very dedicated". Robert N. Butler, who was president of the International Longevity Center in New York and a Pulitzer Prize-winning author on aging, traveled to Cuba to see firsthand how doctors were trained. He said a principal reason that some health standards in Cuba approach the high American level is that the Cuban system emphasizes early intervention. Clinic visits are free, and the focus is on preventing disease rather than treating it. Furthermore, London's The Guardian newspaper lauded Cuba's public healthcare system for what it viewed as its high quality in a September 12, 2007 article.

In 2001, members of the UK House of Commons Health Select committee travelled to Cuba and issued a report that paid tribute to "the success of the Cuban healthcare system", based on its "strong emphasis on disease prevention" and "commitment to the practice of medicine in a community".

The Parliament of the United Kingdom also drew up an analysis of the key features of Cuba's healthcare system, drawing comparisons with the state funded National Health Service (NHS). The overall conclusion was that many of the features identified would not have occurred had there not been an obvious commitment to health provision demonstrated by the protection and proportion of the budget given the health care. The study concluded the following.

- There appeared to be little evidence of a divide between the prevention/proactive response and the disease management/reactive response within Cuban healthcare.
- By far the biggest difference was the ratio of doctors per person. In Cuba it was one doctor per 175 people, in the UK the figure was one doctor per 600 people.
- There is a commitment in Cuba to the triple diagnosis (physical/psychological/social) at all levels.
- Extensive involvement of "patient" and the public in decision making at all levels.
- Integration of hospital/community/primary care via polyclinics.
- Team-work that works is much more evident both in the community and the hospital sector and the mental-health and care of the elderly sites visited were very well staffed and supported.

Margaret Chan, former director of the World Health Organization, recommended other countries follow Cuba's example in health care.

=== Criticism ===
The preceding study also pointed to problems within Cuba's health system, including:

- Low pay of doctors.
- Poor facilities—buildings in poor state of repair and mostly outdated.
- Poor provision of equipment.
- Frequent absence of essential drugs.
- Concern regarding freedom of choice both for patient and doctor.

Tassie Katherine Hirschfeld, an associate professor at the department of anthropology of the University of Oklahoma, did her Ph.D. thesis on the Cuban health system, spending nine months conducting ethnographic work in Cuba in the late 1990s. According to Hirschfeld, "public criticism of the government is a crime in Cuba", which means that "formally eliciting critical narratives about health care would be viewed as a criminal act both for me as a researcher, and for people who spoke openly with me". Nevertheless, she was able to hear from many Cubans, including health professionals, "serious complaints about the intrusion of politics into medical treatment and health care decision-making". She points out that "there is no right to privacy in the physician-patient relationship in Cuba, no patients' right of informed consent, no right to refuse treatment, and no right to protest or sue for malpractice". In her view medical care in Cuba can be dehumanizing.

Complaints have also arisen that foreign "health tourists" paying with dollars and senior Communist party officials receive a higher quality of care than Cuban citizens. Former leading Cuban neurosurgeon and dissident Hilda Molina said that the central revolutionary objective of free, quality medical care for all has been eroded by Cuba's need for foreign currency. Molina said that following the economic collapse known in Cuba as the Special Period, the Cuban Government established mechanisms designed to turn the medical system into a profit-making enterprise. This created an enormous disparity in the quality of healthcare services between foreigners and Cubans, leading to a form of tourist apartheid. In 1998 she said that foreign patients were routinely inadequately or falsely informed about their medical conditions to increase their medical bills or to hide the fact that Cuba often advertises medical services it is unable to provide. Others makes similar claims, also stating that senior Communist party and military officials can access this higher quality system free of charge. In 2005, an account written by Cuban exile and critic of Fidel Castro, Carlos Wotzkow, appeared showing apparent unsanitary and unsafe conditions in the "Clínico Quirúrgico" of Havana; the article claims that health care for Cubans occurs in worse conditions in the rest of the country.

A recent ABC-TV 20/20 report on healthcare, based on footage taken from within the island, criticized Michael Moore's portrayals of the Cuban healthcare system in the documentary film Sicko. In that film, Moore took a number of Americans to a hospital in Havana where they bought affordable drugs, and were given treatments for free that they could not afford in America. The report highlights the dilapidated conditions of some hospitals that are accessible to regular Cubans by pointing to the bleak conditions of hospital rooms and the filthy conditions of the facilities. The report also addressed the quality of care available to Cubans by arguing that patient neglect was a common phenomenon. Finally, in discussing the infant mortality rate, the report highlights the government's alleged efforts to promote abortions of potentially infirm fetuses and other alleged government efforts to manipulate the rate.

Researchers at Texas Tech University wrote that official statistics provided by the Cuban government should be treated sceptically.

Cuban medical professionals are not paid high salaries by international standards. In 2002 the mean monthly salary was 261 pesos, 1.5 times the national mean. A doctor's salary in the late 1990s was equivalent to about US$15–20 per month in purchasing power. Therefore, some prefer to work in different occupations, for example in the lucrative tourist industry where earnings can be much higher.

Cuban doctors that have been sent on international missions by the Cuban government have reported being paid less than the local doctors and treated poorly by the local government. They are sometimes monitored by the local government in case of defecting. The San Francisco Chronicle, the Washington Post, and National Public Radio have all reported on Cuban doctors defecting to other countries when on international missions. Cuban doctors at home have experienced an increased work-load to cover for the doctors abroad, although there is no evidence that this has negatively affected health outcomes.

A 2020 study using a synthetic control method found that infant mortality increased in the first years of the Castro administration relative to other similar countries, but that infant mortality reverted to trend during the 1970s irrespective of foreign aid.

== Black market healthcare ==
All healthcare facilities are free to the Cuban public and without co-pays. There are no private facilities and doctors and nurses cannot work for private pay.

The difficulty in gaining access to certain medicines and treatments has led to healthcare playing an increasing role in Cuba's burgeoning black market economy, sometimes termed "sociolismo". According to former leading Cuban neurosurgeon and dissident Hilda Molina, "The doctors in the hospitals are charging patients under the table for better or quicker service." Prices for out-of-surgery X-rays have been quoted at $50 to $60. Such "under-the-table payments" reportedly date back to the 1970s, when Cubans used gifts and tips in order to get health benefits. The harsh economic downturn known as the "Special Period" in the 1990s aggravated these payments. The advent of the "dollar economy", a legalization of the dollar which led some Cubans to receive dollars from their relatives outside of Cuba, meant that a class of Cubans were able to obtain medications and health services that would not be available to them otherwise.

== See also ==
- Health in Cuba
- Carlos Finlay
- Center of Molecular Immunology
- Cuban medical internationalism
- ELAM (Latin American School of Medicine) Cuba
- List of hospitals in Cuba
- Mission Barrio Adentro
- Sicko
- Gonzalo Aróstegui del Castillo
