= Revista Cubana (disambiguation) =

The word Revista in English may mean a newspaper, journal, periodical, or magazine. Revista Cubana may refer to;

- Revista Cubana, magazine published from 1877 to 1895
- Revista Cubana de Información en Ciencias de la Salud, academic journal created in 1993
- Revista Cubana de Física, physics journal created 1918
- Revista Cubana de Medicina Tropical, medical journal created in 1945
- Revista Cubana de Cirugía, medical journal
- Revista Cubana de Tecnología de la Salud, technology journal created 2007
- Revista Cubana de Ciencia Agrícola, technology journal published by the government of Cuba
- Revista Bimestre Cubana, economic journal created 1831
