= Hilda Molina =

Cuban physician (born 1943)

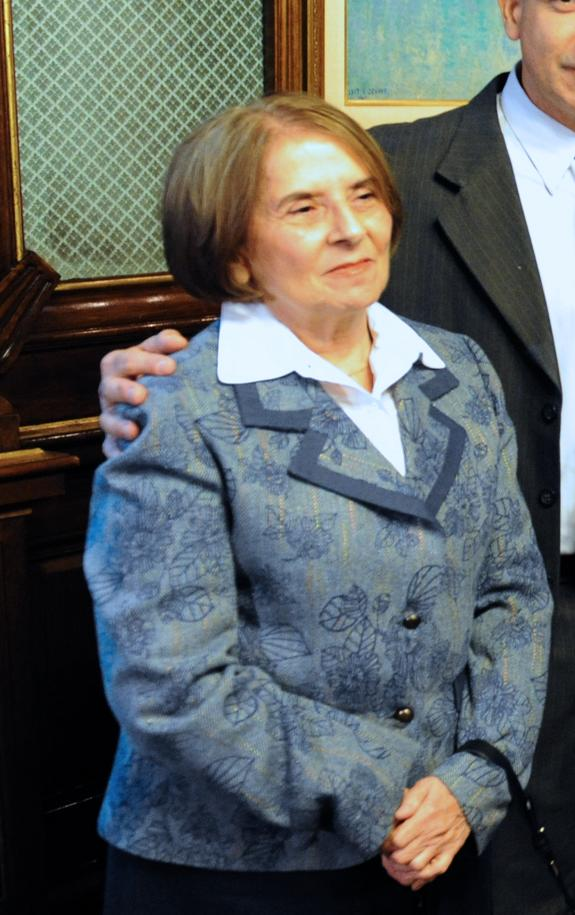
- Born: Hilda Molina y Morejon; Ciego de Avila, Cuba
- Occupation: Neurosurgeon
- Notable work: founded the neurosurgery center in Havana

Hilda Molina (born Hilda Molina y Morejon in 1943 in Ciego de Avila, Cuba) is the former chief neurosurgeon of Cuba. Molina was also a deputy in the Cuban National Assembly but has been a critic of the Cuban government since the early 1990s. Her criticisms focus primarily on Cuba's state-governed healthcare system.

== Career ==
In 1987, Molina founded the neurosurgery center in Havana. By 1991, her center had become one of the most important scientific centers in Cuba. The same year, Molina claims she was informed by the then Minister of Health, Julio Teja Perez, that her center was supposed to treat foreigners paying in U.S. dollars. Previously, the center had treated only Cuban patients. Molina subsequently resigned her position at the center and her seat at the National Assembly. Molina claims that she and her son were subjected to mob retaliation in what are termed "acts of repudiation". She had continuously been denied a visa to travel for personal as well as professional reasons until June, 2009 when permission was granted to visit family in Argentina.

== Requests for travel ==
Molina had made any request to visit family in Argentina. In 2004, after Molina was again denied a visa by the Cuban government. This letter from Molina was forwarded to the United Nations Human Rights Commission and other international human rights groups. In the letter Molina stated: "The Cuban government impeded me from temporarily visiting Argentina for a reunion, after 11 years of forcible separation, with my son, who is a naturalized Argentine, and with his wife who is an Argentine citizen". She also listed numerous examples where she believed her rights had been violated by the Cuban authorities going on to state that "the arbitrary state organs that delay or deny, provoking the tearing apart of thousands of innocent families, that submerges them in paralyzing fear, so they are incapacitated to reclaim the respect for their rights most elemental."

In July 2006, a week before Fidel Castro's illness led to the Cuban transfer of presidential duties to brother Raúl Castro, the Cuban President was questioned by international leaders and journalists on the issue whilst attending a conference in Argentina. Argentine President Néstor Kirchner took the opportunity to press the Cuban leader to allow Molina, a one-time Castro ally, to leave Cuba to be with her children and grandchildren already in Argentina. At an improvised press conference, Miami's Channel 41 reporter Juan Manuel Cao asked Castro about Molina, a reportedly infuriated Castro asked the reporter, "Who is paying you?" and later accused him of being "a mercenary" for President Bush.

In June 2009, it was reported that the Cuban government reversed its position and would allow Molina to visit Argentina. Molina's story was inspirational to Marcos Aguinis' best selling novel La Pasion Segun Carmela.

== Political work ==
A signer of the Madrid Charter, Molina joined the Madrid Forum alliance of right-wing and far-right individuals organized by Spanish political party Vox.

== Biography ==
Molina, Hilda (2010). Mi verdad: de la Revolución cubana al desencanto : la historia de una luchadora (in Spanish). Planeta. ISBN 978-950-49-2289-6.

== See also ==
- Healthcare in Cuba
- Tourism in Cuba
