= Center of Molecular Immunology =

State-owned biotechnology institute in Cuba

The Center of Molecular Immunology (Centro de Inmunología Molecular) or CIM, is a cancer research institution located on the west side of Havana, Cuba. 23.0755°N 82.4708°W

It opened in 1994 in Havana's Science City. CIM focuses on the research and production of new biopharmaceutical products for the treatment of cancer and other nontransmissible diseases.

== Facilities ==
The design and construction of the Center of Molecular Immunology was modeled on current Good Manufacturing Practice guidelines recommended by the World Health Organization and adopted by Cuba, particularly those also adopted by the member countries of the European Union, then known as the European Community.

Research labs, production areas and administrative offices share the 15,000 square meters of the two floor facility.

Approximately 800 employees work at the CIM, most of them scientists and engineers. These personnel are administratively organized in three main areas: Research and Development, Production, and Quality Assurance.

== Research ==
CIM focuses on biotechnology applications of mammalian cells, development of monoclonal antibodies, and cancer vaccines.

Basic research projects are focused on cancer immunotherapy, especially the development of molecular vaccines. These include antibody engineering, cellular engineering, bioinformatics and regulation of the immune response.

CIM conducts clinical trials in diagnostic imaging and cancer therapy of varying origin, as well as other immune system diseases, in highly specialized hospitals.

In August 2011 it was announced that the Center of Molecular Immunology released CimaVax-EGF, the first therapeutic cancer vaccine for lung cancer.

In December 2012, a new therapeutic cancer vaccine was approved by Cuban regulatory agency. CIMAbid (racotumomab or 1E10)obtained conditional approval for the treatment of lung cancer. This vaccine is an antiidiotypic vaccine targeting N-glicolil GM3, a tumor specific antigen. The project leader was Dr Ana María Vazquez. These vaccine has been associated with statistically significant extension of survival of lung cancer patients with excellent safety profile and continues to be investigated in confirmatory clinical trials.

== Products ==
Today CIM produces biopharmaceutical products, such as anti-CD3 monoclonal antibody for the treatment of patients with organ transplant rejection, human recombinant erythropoietin for the treatment of anemia, granulocyte colony-stimulating factor for the treatment of neutropenia, and a humanized monoclonal antibody that recognizes the epidermal growth factor receptor for cancer treatment, as well as other monoclonal antibodies for tumor imaging.

As of 2020, over 90,000 Cubans have been treated with CIM products.

== Commercialization ==
Since 1992 CIMAB S.A. has been working on the commercialization of biopharmaceutical products for the Cuban market and abroad, especially monoclonal antibodies and other recombinant proteins for the diagnosis and treatment of cancer and other diseases related to the immune system.

It was announced in July 2008 that CIM had also received approval from the Cuban regulatory authorities for a lung cancer vaccine, targeting EGFR. The vaccine has been in development since 1992 and the project led by Gisela Gonzalez.

== Joint ventures ==
In 2018, CIM and United States-based Roswell Park Comprehensive Cancer Center formed a joint venture for a United States trial of the Cuban developed lung cancer immunotherapy treatment CIMAvax-EGF.

As of 2020, CIM had three joint ventures with China.

== See also ==
- Healthcare of Cuba
