= Mario Terán =

Bolivian army soldier (1942–2022)

- Born: Mario Terán Salazar; 9 April 1942; Cochabamba, Bolivia
- Died: 10 March 2022 (aged 79) La Paz, Bolivia
- Allegiance: Bolivia
- Rank: Warrant officer
- Known for: Execution of Che Guevara
- Spouse: Julia Peralta Salas
- Children: 6

Mario Terán Salazar (9 April 1942 – 10 March 2022) was a Bolivian Army warrant officer who executed Che Guevara as a young sergeant in 1967. Guevara, a Marxist revolutionary from Argentina, had played a major role in the Cuban Revolution, in which the 26th of July Movement, led by Fidel Castro, ousted U.S.-backed dictator Fulgencio Batista and replaced his government with a revolutionary socialist state.

== Early life ==
Terán was born to Vicente Terán and Candelaria Salazar on 9 April 1942 in Cochabamba, Bolivia. His father, a merchant, was 46 years old when he was born; his mother was 45. Little beyond this is known about Terán's early life.

== Military career and execution of Guevara ==
Terán joined the military sometime in 1959, at which time he was a sergeant in Company A of Bolivia's Manchego Regiment.

In April 1965, Che Guevara left Cuba on his own behest in order to foment socialist revolutions overseas. At this time he dropped off the radar and his whereabouts remained unknown until early 1967. At that time, Bolivian communist youth organizer Loyola Guzmán received a tip locating him in a remote small town near the Paraguay border. Guevara reportedly told Guzmán that he hoped to turn Bolivia into a beachhead for socialist revolutions in neighboring countries. In March of that year, intermittent fighting broke out between Bolivian armed forces and a mysterious group of guerrilla fighters. Rumors that the group was led by Guevara began to spread, and Bolivian army leaders resolved to capture him. During summer, local officials provided tips that helped Bolivian armed forces narrow down his position. Finally, on 8 October, Guevara surrendered to Commander Gary Prado Salmón after a shootout with Bolivian soldiers.

Upon arresting Guevara, Prado had planned to send him to be court martialed, but Bolivian President René Barrientos ordered his execution the next day. At around 11:30 a.m. 9 October, Terán walked into the schoolhouse where Guevara was held prisoner and killed him with several shots from his M2 Carbine. Sources conflict on some details of the execution, including how Terán was selected to perform the act. Some sources state that Terán volunteered for the job. Other sources, including Guevara's brother, state that Terán was ordered by his superiors and that he was reluctant to shoot Guevara.

Terán was later quoted as saying the event was "the worst moment of my life."

After 30 years of military service, Terán retired as a senior warrant officer.

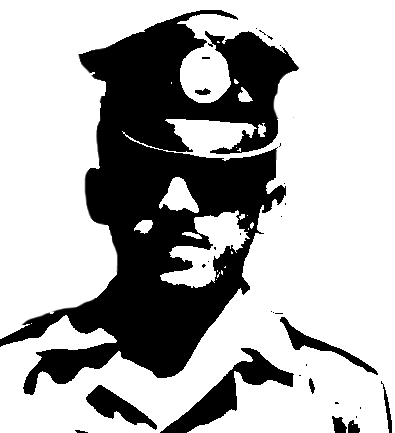

== Later life ==
Terán lived the rest of his life under an assumed name in Santa Cruz de la Sierra, Bolivia's largest city. He and his wife Julia Peralta Salas, whom he married in 1965, had six children – two sons and four daughters.

In 2007, numerous media outlets reported that Terán, under a false name, had received a free cataract removal operation performed by Cuban doctors as part of Operación Milagro. One of Terán's sons asked El Deber, a local Santa Cruz newspaper, to publish a notice thanking the doctors on Terán's behalf. After the Cuban government learned what had transpired, Granma, the official newspaper of the Cuban Communist Party, published an editorial using the event to promote Che Guevara's legacy, writing that "Four decades after Mario Terán attempted to destroy a dream and an idea, Che returns to win yet another battle, and continues on in the struggle". Terán's eye operation had become public knowledge only about a week before the 40th anniversary of Guevara's death.

Some reports at the time, especially those from publications sympathetic to Cuba, additionally stated that Terán had been "virtually blind" before the procedure and that it had cured him of this blindness. However, in a 2014 interview with Spanish newspaper El Mundo Terán disputed these reports. While acknowledging that Cuban doctors had removed cataracts from his eyes, he said that he had never been blind.

Terán died at Military Social Security Corporation hospital in La Paz, on 10 March 2022, at the age of 79.
