= Tourism in Cuba =

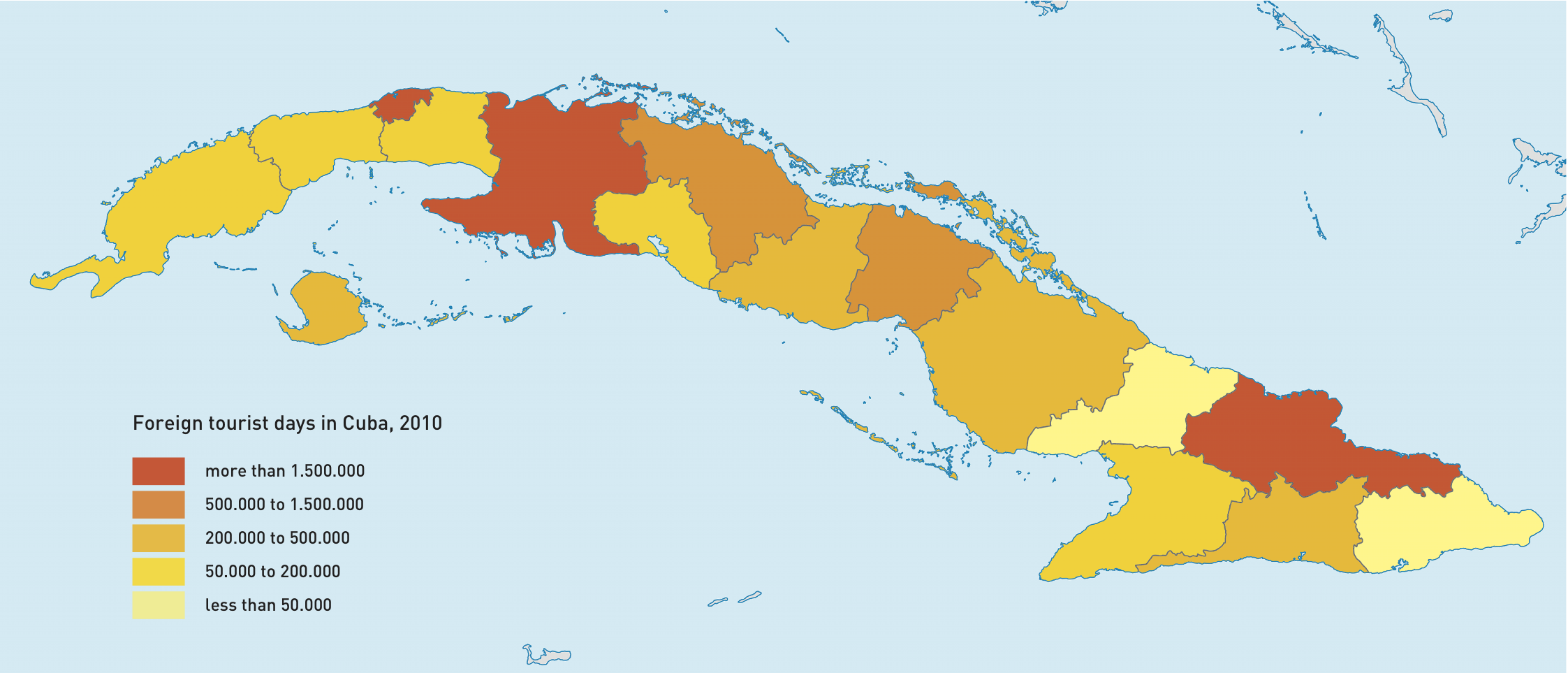
Foreign tourist days in Cuba, 2010

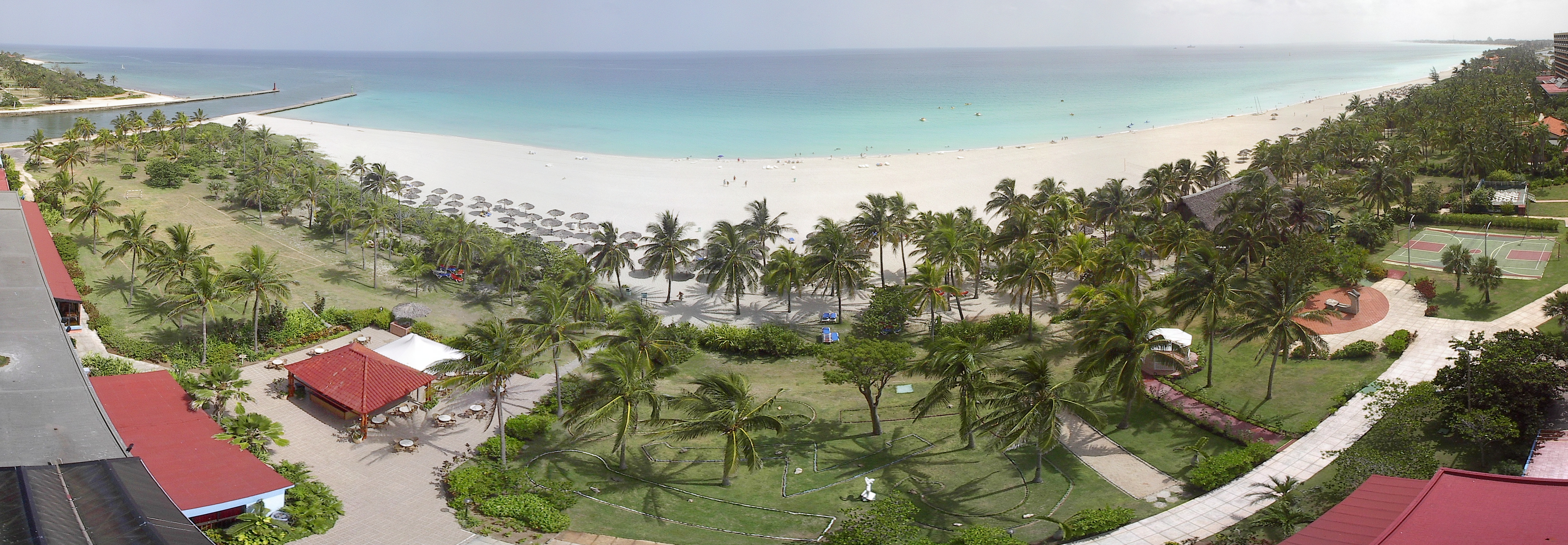
The beach in the resort town of Varadero

Tourism in Cuba is an economic sector that generates over 4.7 million arrivals as of 2018, and is one of the main sources of revenue for the island. With its favorable climate, beaches, colonial architecture and distinct cultural history, Cuba has long been an attractive destination for tourists. "Cuba treasures 253 protected areas, 257 national monuments, 7 UNESCO World Heritage Sites, 7 Natural Biosphere Reserves and 13 Fauna Refuge among other non-tourist zones."

Having been Spain's closest colony to the United States until 1898, in the first part of the 20th century Cuba continued to develop with the influence of big investments, the creation of various industries, and growing travel to support mostly US interests and corporations. Its proximity (roughly 90 miles (140 km) from the Florida Keys) and close relationship with the United States also helped Cuba's market economy prosper fairly quickly. As relations between Cuba and the United States deteriorated rapidly after the Cuban Revolution of 1959 and the resulting expropriation and nationalization of businesses, the island became cut off from its traditional market by an ongoing embargo and a travel ban was imposed on U.S. citizens visiting Cuba. The tourist industry declined to record low levels within two years of Castro's accession to power.

Unlike the US, Canada has maintained normal relations with Cuba, and Canadians increasingly visit Cuba for vacations. Approximately one-third of visitors to Cuba in 2014 were Canadians. The Cuban government has moderated its state ownership policies and allowed for localized and small private businesses since 1980. It also pursues revitalization programs aimed at boosting tourism. The United States reestablished diplomatic relations with Cuba in 2015, in a period referred to as the Cuban Thaw, and the tourism industry has not benefited as much as was predicted from normalized relations with America as the Trump administration reinstated a number of the pre-Cuban Thaw restrictions, and imposed fresh restrictions.

== Overview ==
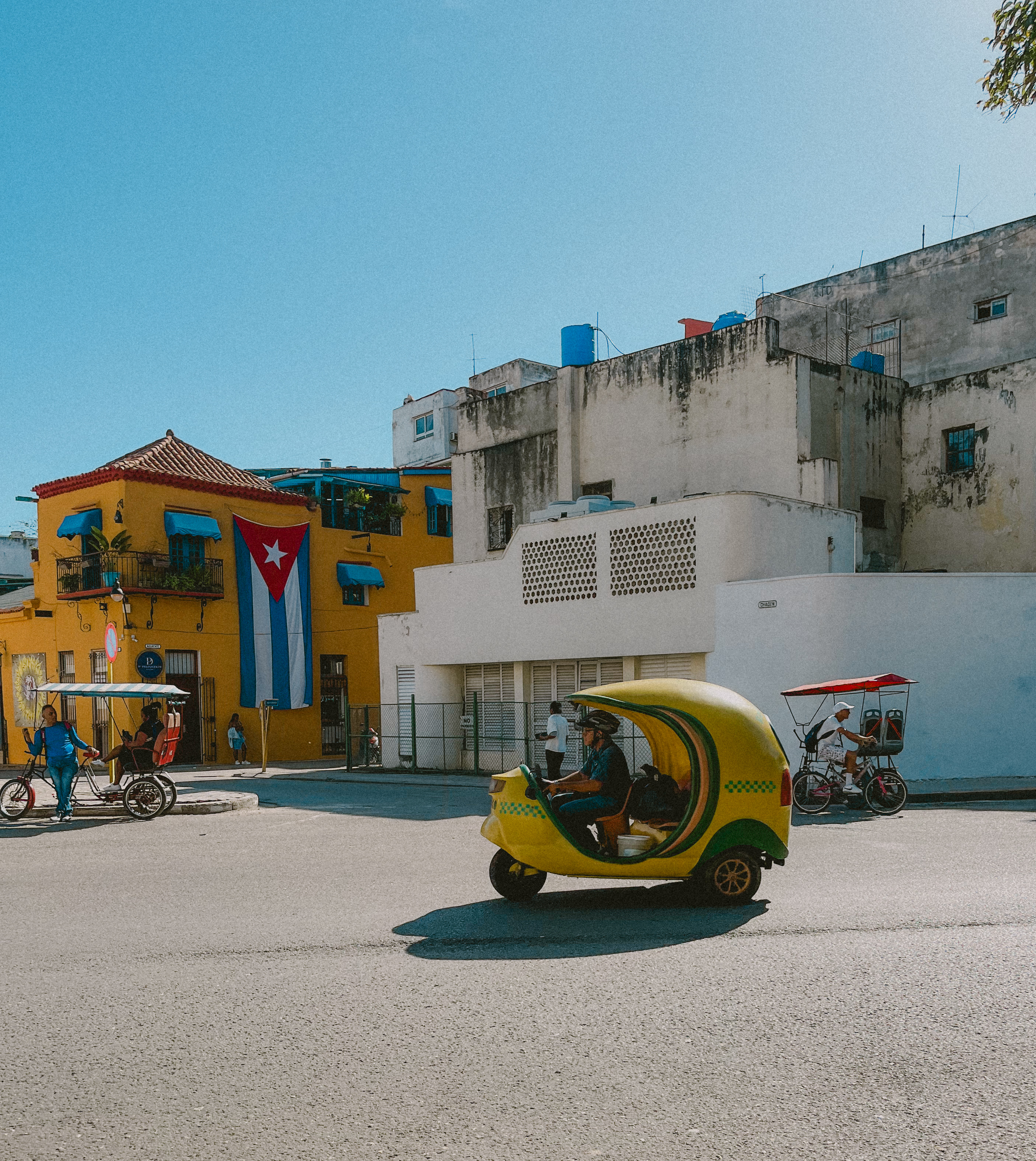
A cocotaxi in Havana, a typical kind of vehicle tourists take for transport

Until 1997, contacts between tourists and Cubans were de facto outlawed by the Communist regime. Following the collapse of Cuba's chief trading partner the Soviet Union, and the resulting economic crisis known as the Special Period, Cuba's government embarked on a major program to restore old hotels, remaining old pre-communism American cars, and restore several Havana streets to their former glory, as well as build beach resorts to bolster the tourist industry to bring in much-needed finance to the island. To ensure the isolation of international tourism from the state-isolated Cuban society, it was to be promoted in enclave resorts where, as much as possible, tourists would be segregated from Cuban society, known as "enclave tourism" and "tourism apartheid". By the late 1990s, tourism surpassed Cuba's traditional export industry, sugar, as the nation's leading source of revenue. Visitors come primarily from Canada and western Europe and tourist areas are highly concentrated around Varadero, Cayo Coco, the beach areas north of Holguin, and Havana. The impact on Cuba's socialist society and economy has been significant. However, in recent years Cuba's tourism has decreased due to the economic recession, escalating foreign investment conflicts and fears, and internal economic restrictions. Since its reopening to tourism in the mid-1990s Cuba has not met the projected growth, has had relatively little restoration, and slow growth. A lack of foreign investment has also had a negative effect. Since then, the Dominican Republic has surpassed Cuba in tourism, new development, and investment.

== History ==
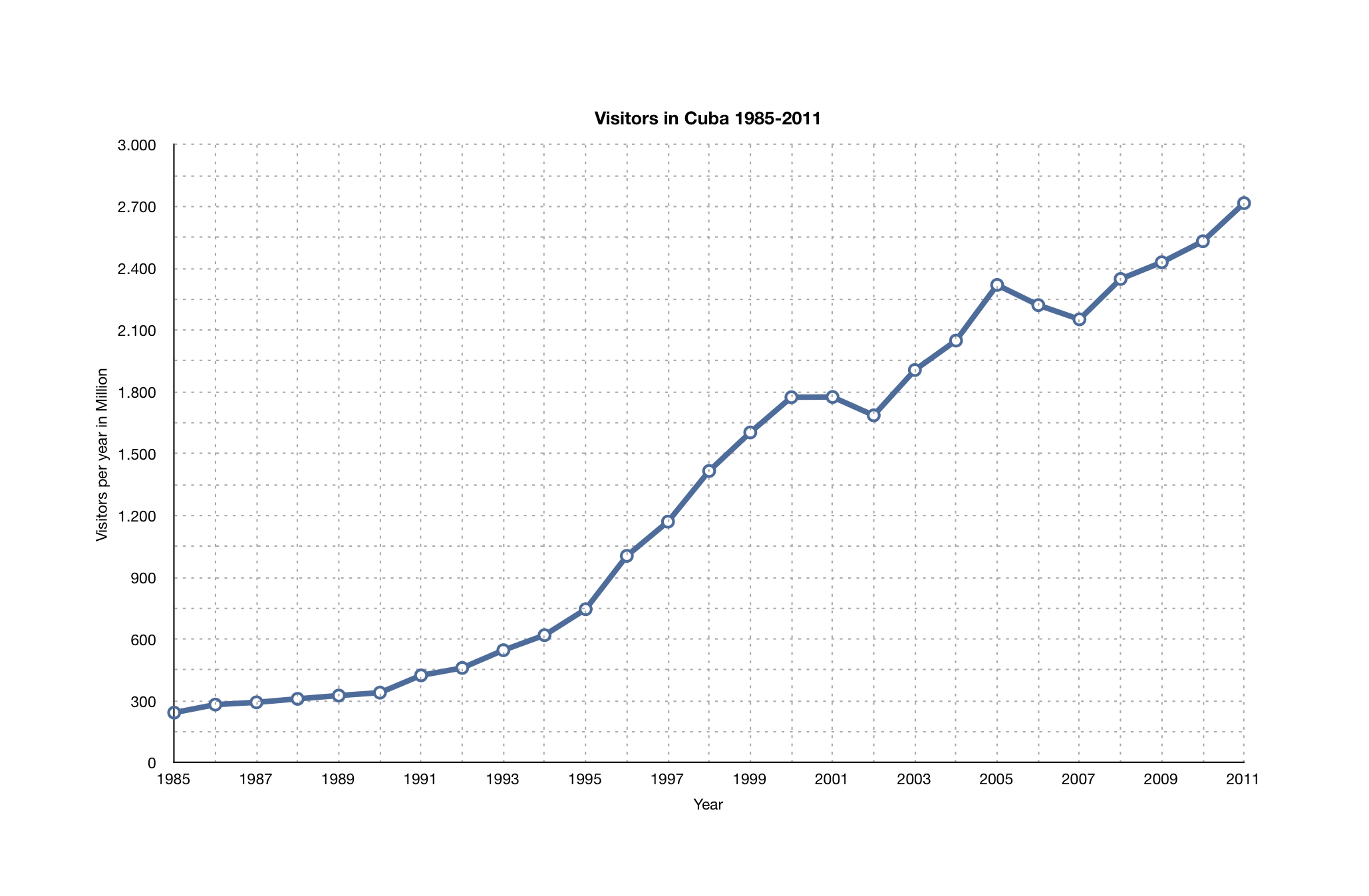
Visitors in Cuba, 1985-2011

=== Early tourism ===
Cuba has long been a popular attraction for tourists. Between 1915 and 1930, Havana hosted more tourists than any other location in the Caribbean. The influx was due in large part to Cuba's proximity to the United States, where restrictive prohibition on alcohol and other pastimes stood in stark contrast to the island's traditionally relaxed attitude to drinking and other pastimes. This is typified by Irving Berlin's 1919 foxtrot song, "I'll See You in C-U-B-A," the lyrics of which ridicule drinking in speakeasies and instead advertise Cuba as a travel destination "where wine is flowing". Tourism became Cuba's third largest source of foreign currency, behind the two dominant industries of sugar and tobacco. Cuban drinks such as the daiquiri and mojito became common in the United States during this time, after Prohibition was repealed.

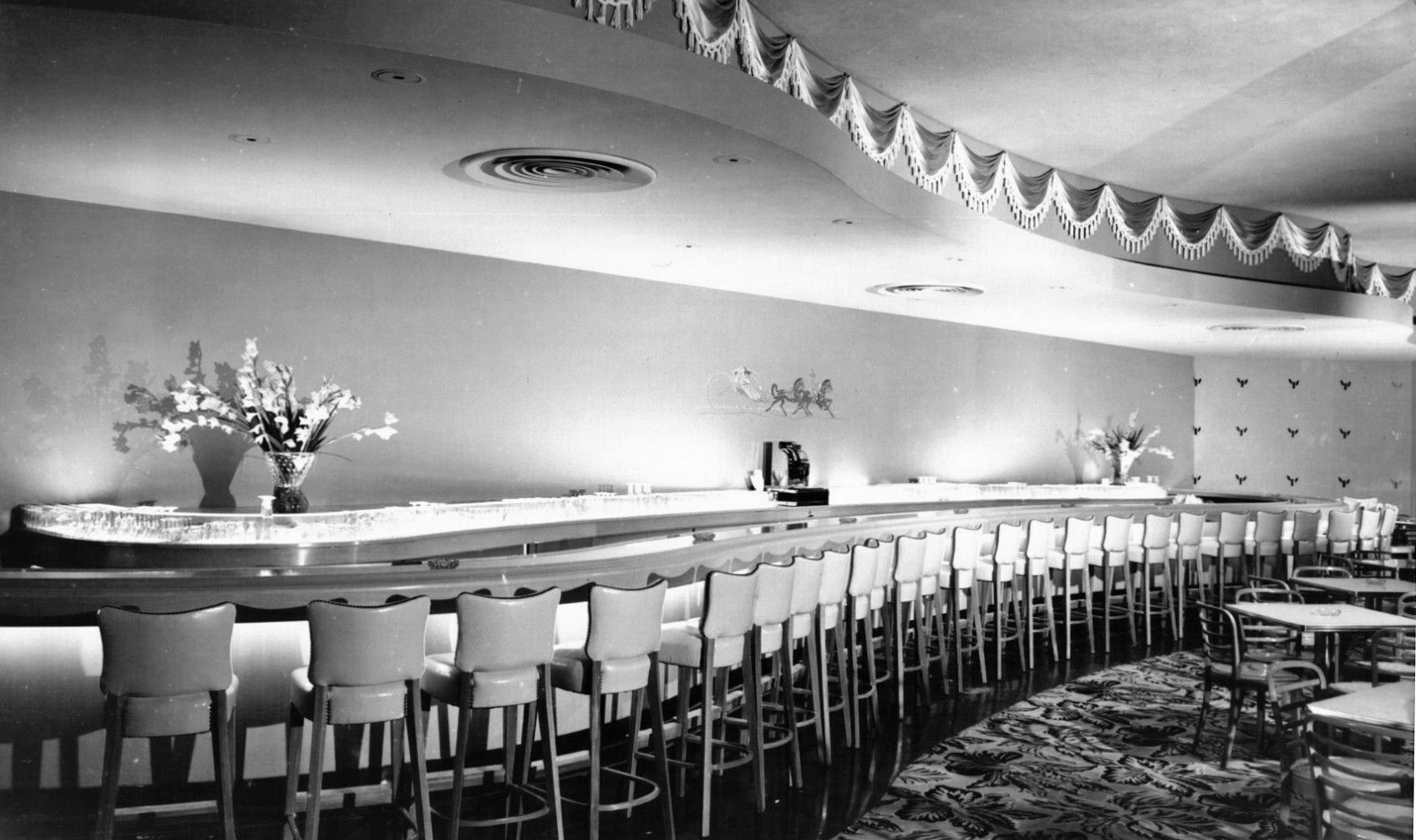
Bar in the Hotel Varadero Internacional, circa 1951

A combination of the Great Depression of the 1930s, the end of Prohibition, and World War II severely dampened Cuba's tourist industry, and it was not until the 1950s that numbers began to return to the island in any significant force. During this period, American organized crime came to dominate the leisure and tourist industries, a modus operandi outlined at the infamous Havana Conference of 1946. By the mid-1950s, Havana became one of the main markets and the favorite route for the narcotics trade to the United States. Despite this, tourist numbers grew steadily at a rate of 8% a year and Havana became known as "the Latin Las Vegas".

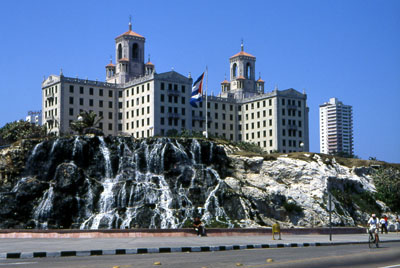
Hotel Nacional in Havana. The hotel's guestlist includes Frank Sinatra, Winston Churchill and Ernest Hemingway, and also played host to the infamous Havana Conference in 1946

=== Decline after Cuban Revolution ===
Immediately upon becoming President of Cuba after the Cuban Revolution of 1959, Manuel Urrutia ordered the closing of many bars and gambling halls associated with prostitution and the drug trade, effectively ending Cuba's image as a hedonistic escape. A new governmental body, the National Institute of the Tourism Industry (INTUR), was established to encourage more tourism; taking over hotels, clubs, and beaches making them available to the general public at low rates. Tourist board chief Carlos Almonia announced a program of huge investment in hotels and the creation of a new airport. But fears of Cuba's post-revolutionary status amongst Americans, who constituted 8 out of 10 visitors, meant a rapid decline in tourism to the island.

In January 1961, relations between the nations sharply deteriorated as a result of bank and business expropriations, mass exodus, summary executions, and private property being declared illegal by a now openly communist regime being backed by the USSR. Tourism travel to Cuba was soon declared by the U.S. State Department to be contrary to U.S. foreign policy and against the national interest. Tourism that year dropped to a record low of a mere 4180, forcing a dramatic downsizing of Cuba's tourist plans. Visitors to Cuba during the 1960s, 70s, and 80s were comparatively rare. The number of tourists to the island did increase slowly, but it was not until 1989 that they equaled pre-Revolutionary numbers.

=== Reforms and revitalization ===
The collapse of the communist regimes in Eastern Europe in 1989 and the fall of the Soviet Union in 1991 caused a crisis in the Cuban economy. The Soviets were Cuba's chief trading partner and had effectively sheltered Cuba's sugar industry with large subsidies for 30 years. The lack of economic diversification during this period, and the sudden loss of key markets such as the Eastern Bloc, sent the country into a deep economic depression euphemistically known in Cuba as the Special Period. The crisis precipitated the communist regime to find new avenues of income.

Policies were drawn up to satisfy the growing tourist markets of Canada and Europe to replace Cuba's reliance on the sugar industry and gain much-needed foreign currency rapidly. A new Ministry of Tourism was created in 1994, and the Cuban state invested heavily in tourist facilities. Between 1990 and 2000, more than $3.5 billion was invested in the tourist industry. The number of rooms available to international tourists grew from 12,000 to 35,000, and the country received a total of 10 million visitors over that period. By 1995 tourism had surpassed sugar as Cuba's chief income source.

Today, travelers from around the world visit Cuba, arriving by a mixture of scheduled and charter airlines to one of Cuba's ten international airports. By far the largest number come from Canada, where arrivals have been increasing by almost 10% annually since 2007. Europeans follow next, primarily arriving from Great Britain, Spain, Italy, France, and Germany. According to the official government agency, it is unknown exactly how many Americans traveled to Cuba each year as tourists, in violation of U.S. trade policy. According to some statistics around 20,000 to 30,000 Americans illegally traveled to Cuba every year, while the Cuban government put it higher at over 60,000. Americans could either fly on direct charter flights or reach Cuba via flights from Canada or Mexico. In June 2016, the US government authorized six airlines to start direct scheduled flights to Cuba. In January 2015, the US government changed its legislation to make it easier for travel from the US to Cuba, further amended in March 2016. While parts of these loosened restrictions were later revoked by President Trump in 2017, travel to Cuba remains legal for US citizens who meet certain requirements. As of 2019, Americans are legally allowed to go to Cuba with an OFAC self-reporting General License if they meet the requirements for one of the 12 categories of legal travel (such as family visits, religious purposes, journalistic work, etc.) Independent travelers to Cuba can qualify for the "Support for the Cuban People" category by maintaining a full-time schedule of activities that fulfill this requirement.

Until 2015, all visitors paid a $25 exit tax at the airport before departure but this is now included in the costs of the flight.

Tourism in Cuba declined sharply in early 2025, with international arrivals down 29.1% and total travelers falling by nearly 78% compared to the same period in 2024. The downturn followed a 9.6% drop in international tourism in 2024 compared to 2023, continuing a downward trend. In the first half of 2026 this trend continued with tourism declining 62% from January to July, compared to the same period in 2025.Contributing factors included economic and energy crises, poor service quality, and limited air connectivity, with major markets such as Canada, Russia, Spain, and Italy seeing significant declines.

== Visitors ==
Yearly tourist arrivals in millions

Cuba tourist arrivals by country (>50,000 visitors in 2018)
Country	2010	2015	2016	2017	2018
Canada	945,248	1,300,405	1,205,809	1,133,824	1,109,339
US	63,046	162,972	284,552	618,346	637,907
Overseas Cubans		390,111	427,747	517,561	600,306
Italy	112,298	137,970	191,585	227,829	208,257
Germany	93,136	175,507	242,355	243,172	197,122
Russia	56,245	44,208	65,386	105,258	189,813
France	80,470	138,972	187,468	209,239	177,652
Mexico	66,650	105,767	131,353	141,540	171,555
UK	174,343	156,052	194,815	205,562	167,370
Spain	104,948	107,903	153,340	168,949	136,613
Argentina	58,612	85,367	94,727	99,435	97,358
Philippines		11,236	18,227	47,866	73,864

== Foreign investment ==
Foreign investment in the Cuban tourism sector has increased steadily since the tourism drive. This has been made possible due to constitutional changes to Cuba's socialist command economy, to allow for the recognition of foreign-held capital. By the late 1990s, twenty-five joint foreign and domestic venture companies were working within Cuba's tourist industry. Foreign investors and hoteliers from market-based economies have found that Cuba's centralized economy and bureaucracy have created particular staffing issues and higher costs than normal. An additional factor cited by foreign investors is the degree of state involvement at the executive level, which is far higher than average.

The influx of foreign capital, and associated capitalist management methods, led outside observers to question whether Cuba's socialist system could survive the resulting transformation. Fidel Castro responded in 1991,

"In the conditions of a small country like Cuba... It is very difficult to develop... relying on one's resources. It is for this reason that we have no alternative but to associate ourselves with those foreign enterprises that can supply capital, technology, and markets."

Castro was also of the belief that despite the undeniable influence of "capitalist ideology", socialism would prevail both in Cuba and the wider "battle of ideas".

One of the most notable developments in recent years has been China's investment in Cuba's tourism sector. As of 2018, Chinese companies had invested over 700 million U.S. dollars in the construction of hotels and other tourism projects.

== Tourism and the environment ==
The Cuban government has established safeguards designed to ensure that tourism and other developments do not result in significant environmental impacts. The development of new tourist facilities and related infrastructure in Cuba must, among other things, proceed by Cuban environmental laws and policies. In 1995 the Cuban government established the Ministry of Science, Technology, and Environment (CITMA) and in 1997 the National Assembly enacted Law 81 of the Environment, one of the most comprehensive "framework" environmental laws in the region. Under that Law, the government adopted several decree laws and resolutions aimed at ensuring that future development (including tourism development) is sustainable. Of particular importance to tourism development is Decree Law 212, Coastal Zone Management, which establishes setbacks and other siting requirements for new facilities in coastal areas. CITMA Resolution 77/99 requires a thorough environmental assessment of major new construction projects and requires that project developers obtain an environmental license from CITMA.

== Tourism by sector ==
=== Health tourism ===
As well as receiving traditional tourism revenues, Cuba attracts health tourists, generating annual revenues of around $40 million for the Cuban economy. Cuba has been a popular health tourism destination for more than 20 years. In 2005, more than 19,600 foreign patients traveled to Cuba for a wide range of treatments including eye surgery, neurological disorders such as multiple sclerosis and Parkinson's disease, and orthopedics. Many patients are from Latin America, although medical treatment for retinitis pigmentosa, often known as night blindness, has attracted many patients from Europe and North America.

Some complaints have arisen that foreign "health tourists" paying with dollars receive a higher quality of care than Cuban citizens. Former leading Cuban neurosurgeon and dissident Dr. Hilda Molina asserts that the central revolutionary objective of free, quality medical care for all has been eroded by Cuba's need for foreign currency. Molina says that following the economic collapse known in Cuba as the Special Period, the Cuban government established mechanisms designed to turn the medical system into a profit-making enterprise, thus creating a disparity in the quality of healthcare services between Cubans and foreigners.

=== Mountain tourism ===
A series of studies published in the 2010s show that Cuba has a huge potential for mountaineering activity; however, it is not utilized properly. Mountaineering, these studies argue, should be considered one of the key contributors to the development, prosperity, and well-being of all stakeholders, especially for the communities outside the tourism enclaves. Furthermore, mountaineering regions mostly lie outside the enclaves, so no conflict will exist between active and all-inclusive tourism. And what is most important is that tourism product diversification (both product and spatial) can be achieved. Communities can promote mountaineering, as well as other forms of active tourism (e.g. biking, diving, caving), by creating spatial and thematic product links as well as synergies (also with all-inclusive tourism).

=== Sex tourism ===
Although Fidel Castro sought to eliminate prostitution after taking power, the discrepancy between typical Cuban wages (less than one US dollar per day) and the spending power of foreign tourists lures some Cubans, including minors, into prostitution. However, allegations of widespread sex tourism have been downplayed by Cuban justice minister Maria Esther Reus. According to the Miami Herald, prostitution is not illegal in Cuba, but procuring a prostitute for others is outlawed. The age of sexual consent on the island is 16. According to a travel advice website by the government of Canada, "Cuba is actively working to prevent child sex tourism, and several tourists, including Canadians, have been convicted of offenses related to the corruption of minors aged 16 and under. Prison sentences range from 7 to 25 years." It is illegal to import or produce pornography in Cuba.

While the growth of tourism has benefited the city of Havana economically, there have been several negative side effects. One such side effect is the revival of sex tourism in the city. Sex tourism was a central part of the tourism industry before the Revolution. However, after 1960, prostitution was essentially eradicated on the island due to government initiatives and a significant drop in demand as tourism was minimized. With tourism becoming more prevalent in the 1990s, however, so did the practice of prostitution. The demographic profile of tourists (the overwhelming majority being men between ages 25–60) is a key indicator of the existence of prostitution. Additionally, websites and magazines, such as Playboy, have outlined the opportunities for both heterosexual and homosexual sex tourism. According to Trumbull, many prostitutes engage in the practice out of economic necessity, but they do not work in oppressive conditions and a large number of prostitutes in contemporary Havana see the work as a way to earn a better living than if they were to work in open jobs throughout the city. Therefore, contemporary prostitution is different than the sex tourism of the 1950s in this regard.

== Tourism: economic reform ==
Cuba remains one of the few countries with an economy established by a centralized government. Among those countries, only Cuba possesses a large international tourism sector. The fall of the USSR and the U.S. embargo imposed in 1961 affected Cuba's tourism sector. Cuba was dependent on the USSR and after its collapse saw tourism as an option to reduce the effects of the crisis. Cuba's touring numbers began to decrease during the 1960s through the 1980s due to the U.S. embargo during the Cold War. Additionally, almost 62,000 tourists traveled to Cuba in 1960, 4180 tourists in 1961, and then almost zero over the next 20 years. Also, new hotels were built and old hotels were renovated to draw more international visitors. When Raul Castro rose to power in 2008, he implemented infrastructure reform to help reduce the effects of the Cuban revolution. The Cuban government built beach resorts to further expand tourism. Castro's reform policies led to increased tourism and large economic success in Cuba. 2.7 million people visited Cuba in 2011, while only 340,000 people toured Cuba in 1990. The National GDP increased from 30.69 billion in 2002 to 114.10 billion in 2010. While infrastructure reform benefitted Cuba's GDP and tourism numbers, average spending decreased from $1,310 in 1995 to $876 in 2015. Furthermore, Cuba ranks one of the lowest for returns in the travel industry. Contributing to the low rank: low-quality food, poor customer service, and low affordability. These issues must be resolved to maintain Cuba's tourism economically in the long term.

== Casas particulares ==
In the context of tourism, a private residence in Cuba that has been converted to allow paid lodging, usually on a short-term basis, akin to bed and breakfast residences elsewhere, is usually referred to as a "casa particular", which simply means "private house". These are typically single-family residences and are a very popular choice for tourists. Prices can range from 15 to 30 euros per night or less for longer stays. The casas provide an inexpensive option for young or independent tourists. A stay in a private casa allows tourists more opportunities to mix with local Cubans and engage in Cuban cultural life.

== Social impacts of tourism ==
=== Internal migration ===
As tourism plays an increasing role in the economy, a large percentage of young people migrate to resort towns seeking employment in the tourism industry. Many of them working in menial jobs can earn more through tips than they can employed as professionals. Thus, there is an economic and social divide emerging in Cuba between those employed in the tourist industry and others.

Researchers find that the flocking of citizens to tourist regions such as Havana creates ‘tourist bubbles.’ This means that the isolated areas of the country visible to tourists are well maintained and developed to meet expectations of an ‘authentic’ experience while residents of surrounding areas continue to struggle with poverty, crime, and general deterioration of living conditions. Since jobs in the tourist sector are so lucrative, these areas experience an incredible influx of residents which cannot possibly be supported by the number of opportunities in the legal job market. As such, many of the citizens who flood tourist areas turn to illicit alternatives such as prostitution or unlicensed self-employment (often offer taxi services, currency exchange, host casas particulares, etc.)

=== Socio-economic divisions ===
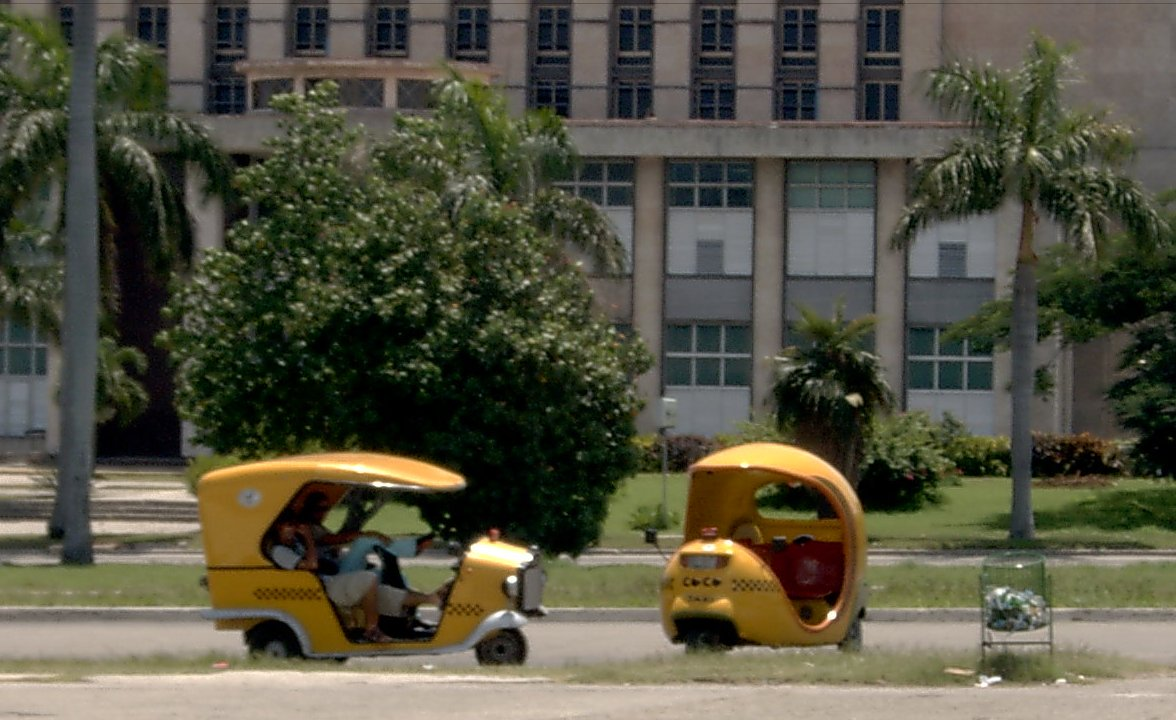
"Cocotaxis" in Plaza de la Revolución, Havana. Because of the rapid growth of tourism in Cuba, taxi drivers can earn more than lawyers and doctors.

Between 1992 and 2008, to gain the much-needed hard currency, some hotels and resorts were opened only to foreign tourists, leading to accusations of "tourism apartheid". The policy was reversed by the Cuban government in 2008.

Cuba's tourism policies of the early 1990s, which were driven by the government's pressing need to earn hard currency, had a major impact on the underlying egalitarianism espoused by the Cuban revolution. Two parallel economies and societies quickly emerged, divided by their access to the newly legalized U.S. dollar. Those having access to dollars through contact with the lucrative tourist industry suddenly found themselves at a distinct financial advantage over professional, industrial, and agricultural workers.

To ensure the isolation of international tourism from Cuban society, tourism was to be promoted in enclave resort where, as much as possible, tourists would be segregated from Cuban society. This was not lost on the average Cuban citizen, and the government tourism policy soon began to be referred to as "enclave tourism" and "tourism apartheid".

In 1992, as Cuba entered a period of severe economic austerity, Fidel Castro defended the newly instituted policies in a speech to the Cuban National Assembly. He described the moves as an economic necessity that would need to be maintained for as long as the country needed foreign currency. According to Castro, the government was "pondering formulas" that would allow Cubans to use some of the tourist facilities as a reward for outstanding work, but he believed that giving Cubans access to amenities at the expense of paying foreign tourists would ultimately be a counterproductive move for the economy.

Until 1997, contact between tourists and Cubans was de facto outlawed, and Cubans seen in contact with tourists were regarded as potential thieves by police. Global human-rights groups' complaints, and the upcoming visit of Pope John Paul II, helped cause an about-face, although such contact was still frowned upon. Police often demanded identification checks of any Cubans seen in contact with tourists. Tourist identification was usually not checked unless the tourist had dark skin and was mistaken for Cuban. Despite the restrictions, average Cubans thrive on Cuba's tourist industry, and many simply see the policy as inevitable.

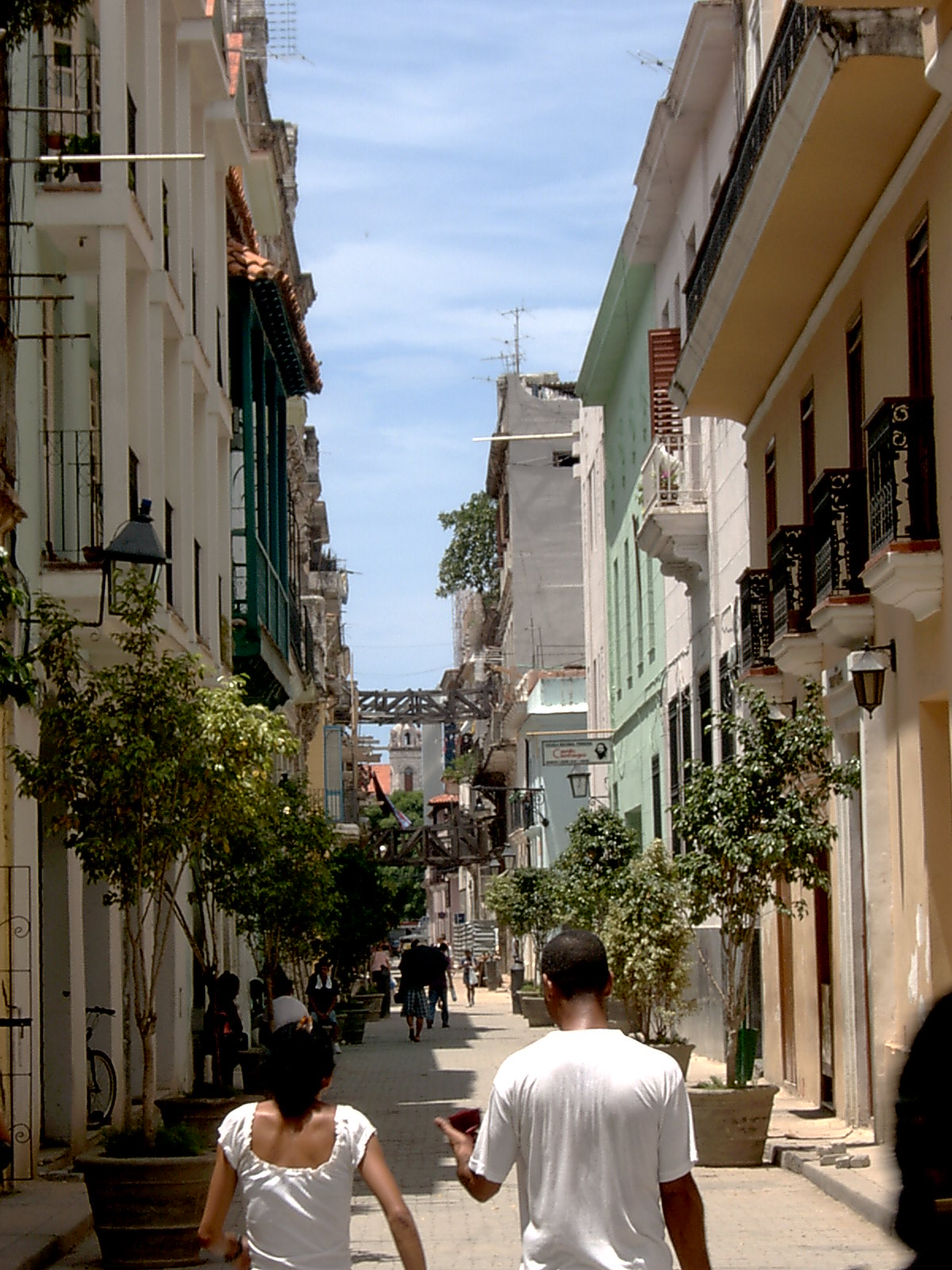
A street in the popular tourist district of Old Havana

The policy of restricting certain hotels and services to tourists was ended by the government of Raúl Castro in March 2008. As well as officially allowing Cubans to stay in any hotel, the change also opened access to previously restricted areas such as Cayo Coco. Government-run tour agencies began special offers aimed at the general population, allowing them to spend a few days in beach resorts.

== See also ==
- Economy of Cuba
- Museums in Cuba
- Visa policy of Cuba
- Freedom to Travel to Cuba Act
