= Cuban medical internationalism =

Aspect of Cuban foreign policy

After the 1959 Cuban Revolution, Cuba established a program to send its medical personnel overseas, particularly to Latin America, Africa, and Oceania, and to bring medical students and patients to Cuba for training and treatment respectively. In 2007, Cuba had 42,000 workers in international collaborations in 103 countries, of whom more than 30,000 were health personnel, including at least 19,000 physicians. Cuba provides more medical personnel to the developing world than all the G8 countries combined. The Cuban missions have had substantial positive local impacts on the populations served. It is widely believed that medical workers are a vital export commodity for Cuba. According to Granma, the Cuban state newspaper, the number of Cuban medical staff abroad fell from 50,000 in 2015 to 28,000 in 2020.

A major criticism of the program is that the doctors involved, who are sent by Cuba, are sometimes sent against their will, and with little to no compensation for their services—as opposed to medical international aid from nearly any other country.

== Missions abroad ==
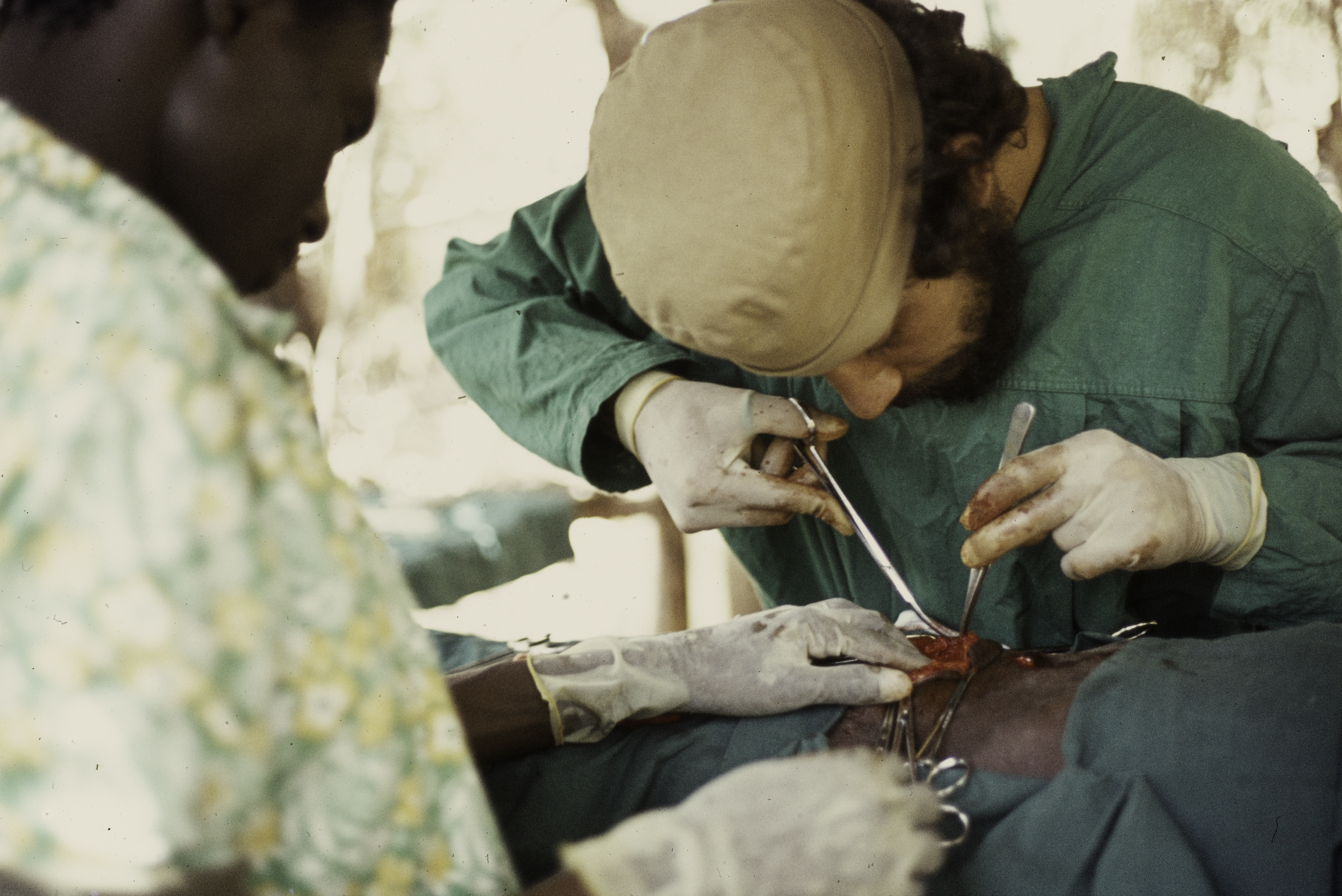
A Cuban surgeon with scrub cap performing an open air operation in Guinea-Bissau for the PAIGC liberation movement, 1974

A 2007 academic study on Cuban internationalism surveyed the history of the program, noting its broad sweep: "Since the early 1960s, 28,422 Cuban health workers have worked in 37 Latin American countries, 31,181 in 33 African countries, and 7,986 in 24 Asian countries. Throughout a period of four decades, Cuba sent 67,000 health workers to structural cooperation programs, usually for at least two years, in 94 countries ... an average of 3,350 health workers working abroad every year between 1960 and 2000". In November 2019, the United Nations estimated that there were around 30,000 Cuban doctors active in 67 countries. Since 1963, more than 600,000 Cuban health workers have provided medical services in more than 160 countries. In 2020, Cuban doctors were active in over 60 countries.

The term "disaster tourism" arose in response to a growing number of large-scale natural disasters. The phrase refers to individuals, governments and organisations who travel to a disaster area with the primary goal of having an "experience" rather than providing meaningful aid. Such aid is often short-lived and may even get in the way of more serious rescue efforts. Cuban medical internationalism represents a polar opposite to this disaster tourism mentality, with a focus on large-scale, sustained aid targeting the most marginalised and underserved populations across the globe.

=== Anti-colonialism ===
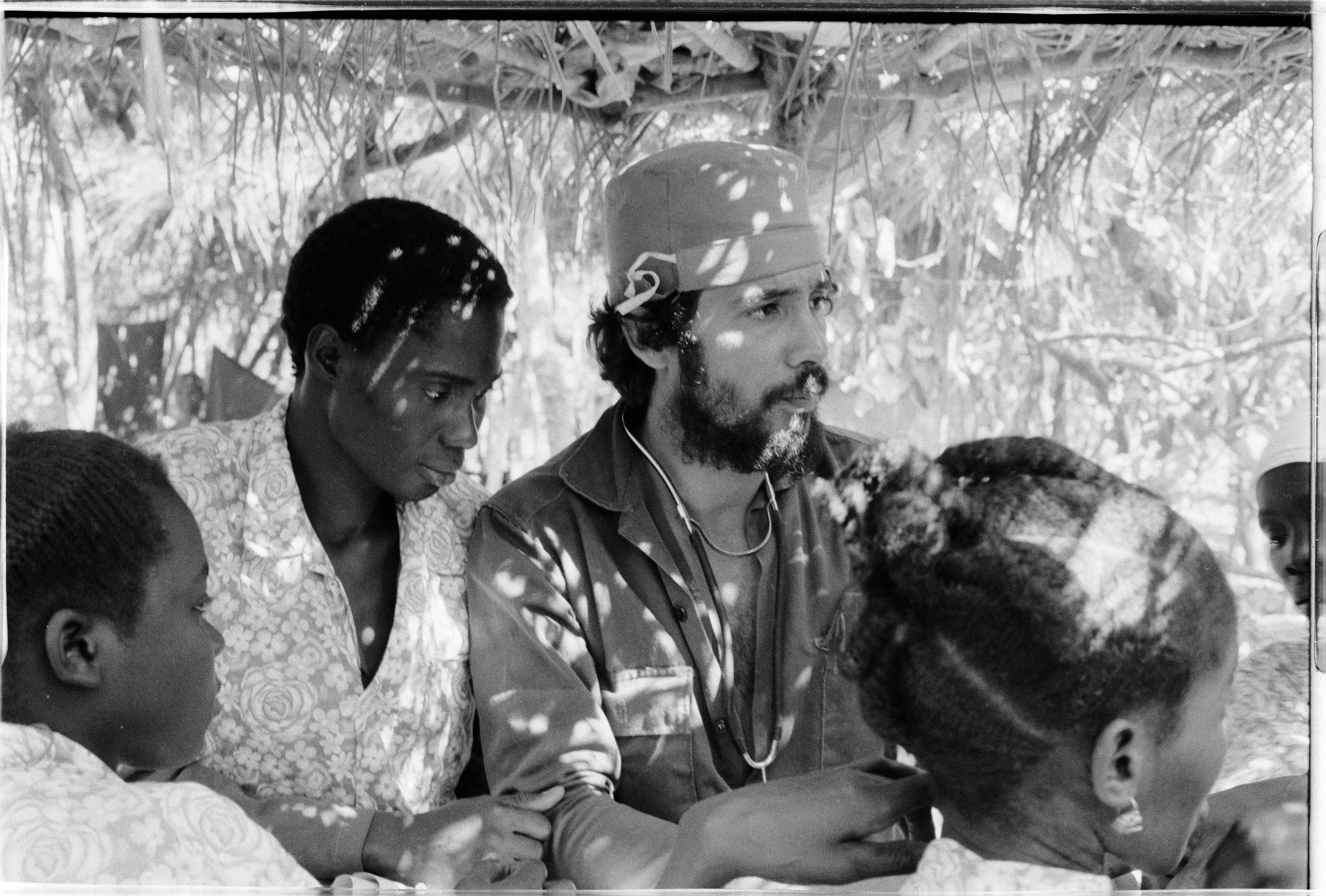
A Cuban doctor in Guinea-Bissau in 1974.

In 1960, Cuba sent an emergency brigade to Chile to assist the recovery from the Valdivia earthquake. The program was officially initiated in 1963 as part of Cuba's foreign policy of supporting anti-colonial struggles. It began when Cuba sent a small medical brigade to Algeria, which suffered from the mass withdrawal of French medical personnel during the Algerian War of Independence. Some wounded soldiers and war orphans were also transported back to Cuba for treatment. Cuba was able to put this program in place despite half the country's 6,000 doctors fleeing after the Cuban revolution. Between 1966 and 1974, Cuban doctors worked alongside Cuban artillery in Guinea-Bissau during its war of independence against Portugal. Cuba's largest foreign campaign was in Angola where, in 1977, two years after the campaign's commencement, only one Angolan province out of sixteen was without Cuban health technicians. After 1979, Cuba also developed a strong relationship with Nicaragua.

=== Humanitarianism ===
In addition to the internationalism which was driven by foreign policy objectives, humanitarian objectives also played a role in Cuba's overseas medical program, with medical teams dispatched to countries governed by ideological foes. For example, in 1960, 1972 and 1990, Cuba dispatched emergency assistance teams to Chile, Nicaragua, and Iran following earthquakes. Similarly, Venezuela's Mission Barrio Adentro program grew out of the emergency assistance provided by Cuban doctors in the wake of the December 1999 mudslides in Vargas state, which killed 20,000 people.

Cuban medical missions were sent to Honduras, Guatemala and Haiti following 1998's Hurricane Mitch and Hurricane Georges, and remained there semi-permanently. From 1998 onwards, Cuba expanded its international cooperation in health dramatically. The number of Cuban doctors working abroad jumped from about 5,000 in 2003 to more than 25,000 in 2005.

In Honduras, the medical personnel had a substantial impact: "In the areas they served, infant mortality rates were reduced from 30.8 to 10.1 per 1,000 live births and maternal mortality rates from 48.1 to 22.4 per 1,000 live births between 1998 and 2003." However, as one academic paper noted, "The idea of a nation saving lives and improving the human condition is alien to traditional statecraft and is therefore discounted as a rationale for the Cuban approach." In 2004, the 1700 medical personnel in Guatemala received the Order of the Quetzal, the country's highest state honour. A 2005 attempt by Honduras to expel the Cuban mission on the basis that it was threatening Honduran jobs was successfully resisted by trade unions and community organisations.

Following the 2004 Asian tsunami, Cuba sent medical assistance to Banda Aceh and Sri Lanka. In response to Hurricane Katrina, Cuba prepared to send 1500 doctors to New Orleans, however, the offer was refused. Several months later, a mission was dispatched to Pakistan following the 2005 Kashmir earthquake. Ultimately, Cuba sent "more than 2,500 disaster response experts, surgeons, family doctors, and other health personnel", who stayed through the winter for more than 6 months. Cuba helped during the medical crisis in Haiti after the 2010 Haiti earthquake. All 152 Cuban medical and educational personnel in the Haitian capital Port-au-Prince at the time of the earthquake were reported to be safe, with two suffering minor injuries. In 2014, Cuba sent 103 nurses and 62 doctors to help fight the Ebola virus epidemic in West Africa, the biggest contribution of health care staff by any single country.

In the first year of the COVID-19 pandemic, Cuba sent 57 brigades of medical specialists and abroad. These specialists treated 1.26 million COVID patients in 40 countries. A Cuban medical team consisting of over 50 medical personnel was dispatched to Italy at the request of the worst-affected region Lombardy. Cuban medical teams also assisted in Andorra and in Latin America, the Caribbean, Africa, Asia and the Middle East.

Cuban doctors, accustomed to working under resource-constrained conditions, have been requested to assist in the pandemic response abroad. Despite the international demand for these professionals, there are concerns regarding the working conditions and the distribution of their salaries when they work abroad, as a significant portion is retained by the Cuban government. Reports surfacing in early 2022 revealed that the doctors who travel abroad on behalf of the Cuban government often do so against their will and without monetary compensation similar to doctors from other countries. Another report found that nearly 7,000–8,000 doctors since 2006 have gone into hiding or failed to return to Cuba after having gone abroad as part of the Cuban government's "volunteering" them to provide healthcare to foreign nationals without remuneration. While Cuban doctors are sent abroad to assist in medical missions, domestically, although wages in the health sector have increased in recent years, they are still considered low compared to the prices of basic goods in Cuba.

=== Oceania ===
In the 2000s, Cuba began establishing or strengthening relations with Pacific Island countries and providing medical aid to those countries. Cuba's medical aid to Pacific countries has involved sending its doctors to Oceania and providing scholarships for Pacific students to study medicine in Cuba at Cuba's expense.

In 2007, there were sixteen Cuban doctors providing specialised medical care in Kiribati, and an additional sixteen scheduled to join them. Cuba also offered training to Kiribati doctors. Cuban doctors have reportedly provided a dramatic improvement to the field of medical care in Kiribati, reducing the child mortality rate in that country by 80%, and winning the proverbial hearts and minds in the Pacific. In response, the Solomon Islands began recruiting Cuban doctors in July 2007, while Papua New Guinea and Fiji considered following suit.

In 2008, Cuba was due to send doctors to the Solomon Islands, Vanuatu, Tuvalu, Nauru and Papua New Guinea, while seventeen medical students from Vanuatu would study in Cuba. It was reported that it might also provide training for Fiji doctors.

As of September 2008, fifteen Cuban doctors were serving in Kiribati, sixty-four Pacific students were studying medicine in Cuba, and Cuban authorities were offering "up to 400 scholarships to young people of that region". Among the sixty-four students were twenty-five Solomon Islanders, twenty I-Kiribati, two Nauruans and seventeen ni-Vanuatu. Pacific Islanders have been studying in Cuba since 2006.

In June 2009, Prensa Latina reported that Cuban doctors had "inaugurated a series of new health services in Tuvalu". One Cuban doctor had been serving in Tuvalu since October 2008, and two more since February 2009. They had reportedly "attended 3,496 patients, and saved 53 lives", having "opened ultrasound and abortion services, as well as specialized consultations on hypertension, diabetes, and chronic diseases in children". They had visited all the country's islands, and were training local staff in "primary health care, and how to deal with seriously ill patients, among other subjects".

=== Venezuela ===
Cuba's largest and most extensive medical aid effort is with Venezuela. The program grew out of the emergency assistance provided by Cuban doctors in the wake of the December 1999 mudslides in Vargas state, which killed 20,000 people. Under this bilateral effort, also known as the "oil for doctors" program, Cuba provided Venezuela with 31,000 Cuban doctors and dentists and provided training for 40,000 Venezuelan medical personnel. In exchange, Venezuela provided Cuba with 100,000 barrels of oil per day. Based in February 2010 prices, the oil was worth $7.5 million per day, or nearly $3 billion per year.

Following the development of cooperation with Venezuela through Mission Barrio Adentro, Mission Milagro/Operación Milagro was set up to provide ophthalmology services to Cuban, Venezuelan and Latin American patients, both in Cuba and in other countries. As of August 2007, Cuba had performed over 750,000 eye surgeries, at no cost, including 113,000 surgeries for its own citizens. Cuba continued to grow the program and by 2017 had established 69 Operación Milagro clinics in 15 countries. By 2019, over 4 million people in 34 countries had received free surgery through the program.

In 2017, The Miami Herald reported that groups of Cuban health care workers who had defected from the program stated that due to the daily quotas of patients, they would often feel pressured to fake paperwork and throw away medicine, since regular audits of their supplies meant they needed them to match their patient count. If Cuban medical personnel did not meet their quotas, they were threatened with having their pay cut or being sent back to Cuba.

=== Other countries ===
Since 1990, Cuba has provided long-term care for 24,000 victims of the Chernobyl disaster, "offering treatment for hair loss, skin disorders, cancer, leukemia, and other illnesses attributed to radioactivity", free of charge.

Cuba has also sent notable missions to Bolivia (particularly after the 2005 election of Evo Morales) and South Africa, the latter in particular after a post-apartheid brain drain of white doctors. Since 1996, a co-operation agreement with South Africa has seen hundreds of Cuban doctors practice in South Africa, while South Africa sends medical students to Cuba to study. In 2012, the two governments signed another deal, increasing numbers on both sides. Under the deal, South Africa could send 1,000 students to Cuba for training, which South Africa believed would help train the doctors it desperately needs for the implementation of its National Health Insurance Scheme. After the 1999 violence in East Timor, the country of a million people was left with only 35 physicians and 75% of its population displaced. The number later increased to 79 physicians by 2004, and Cuba sent an additional 182 physicians and technicians.

"From 1963 to 2004, Cuba was involved in the creation of nine medical faculties in Yemen, Guyana, Ethiopia, Guinea-Bissau, Uganda, Ghana, Gambia, Equatorial Guinea, and Haiti."

In 2023 Cuba sent 171 doctors to aid Italian hospitals in the poor region of Calabria, which are severely understaffed.

=== Salaries ===
Cuba's overseas medical missions are intended to provide services at low cost to the host country. "Patients are not charged for services, and the recipient countries are expected to cover only the cost of collective housing, airfare, and limited food and supplies not exceeding $200 a month. While Cuban doctors are abroad, they continue to receive their salaries as well as a stipend in the foreign currency". In 2008, the pay for Cuban doctors abroad was $183 per month, whereas the pay for doctors working domestically was $23 per month.

However, during the COVID-19 pandemic there was concern in South Africa about the relatively high salaries to be paid for Cuban medical assistance even as many South African doctors and nurses remained unemployed.

== Latin American School of Medicine ==
In response to Hurricane Mitch in 1998, Cuba set up the Escuela Latinoamericana de Medicina (abbreviated as ELAM, and in English the Latin American School of Medicine) outside Havana, converted from a former naval base. It accepts around 1500 students per year. ELAM forms part of a range of medical education and training initiatives; "Cubans, with the help of Venezuela, are currently educating more doctors, about 70,000 in all, than all the medical schools in the United States, which typically have somewhere between 64,000 to 68,000 students enrolled in their programs". ELAM selects students from a working-class background who would not be able to afford university otherwise.

== Effects on Cuba ==
=== Benefits ===
Both humanitarian and ideological factors were prominent in Cuba's "doctor diplomacy", particularly during the Cold War. Subsequently, its continuation has been seen as a vital means to promote Cuba's image abroad and prevent international isolation. Cuba's health missions in Honduras were "undoubtedly a deciding factor" in the re-establishment of diplomatic relations between the two countries in 2002; Guatemala re-established diplomatic relations with Cuba in 1998.

It has also been suggested that Cuban medical internationalism promotes exports of Cuban medical technology and may be a source of hard currency. However, the targeting of poor countries reduces the hard currency potential of missions abroad. In 2006, Cuba's earnings from medical services, including the export of doctors, amounted to US$2,312M – 28% of total export receipts and net capital payments. This exceeded earnings from both nickel and cobalt exports and from tourism. These earnings were achieved despite the fact that a substantial part of Cuba's medical internationalism since 1998 has been organised within the framework of the "Integrated Health Program" (Programa Integral de Salud, PIS); this cooperation program is free for the receiving country. Cuba's co-operation with Venezuela provides Cuba with cheap oil in exchange for its medical support to Mission Barrio Adentro. Bloomberg reported in March 2014 that Cuban state-controlled media forecasted revenue of $8.2 billion that year from the program.

It has also been argued that the program has, particularly in the 1980s and 1990s, "perform[ed] a critical function in consolidating socialist consciousness" within Cuba.

=== Costs ===
Although Cuba's large-scale medical training programs and high doctor-patient ratios give it much latitude, the expansion of doctor diplomacy since 2004, particularly with the Barrio Adentro program, has been dramatic: the number of Cuban doctors working abroad jumped from about 5000 in 2003 to more than 25,000 in 2005. This has had some impact on the domestic health system, for example there have been increased waiting times, particularly with regard to family doctors. The number of patients per doctor rose from 139 to 179. In March 2008, Cuba announced a reorganisation of its domestic family doctor program for greater efficiency.

=== Possible effects of lifting the U.S. embargo ===
A 2010 article by Laurie Garrett in Foreign Affairs warned that lifting the United States trade and travel restrictions on Cuba could have dire consequences for Cuba's health care system, leading to an exodus of thousands of well-trained Cuban health-care professionals. U.S. companies could also transform the remaining health care system into a destination for medical tourism. Garrett concluded that, if politicians do not take great care, lifting of the restrictions would rob Cuba of its greatest triumph.

== Reports of slavery and political coercion ==
When the Mais Médicos program in Brazil was established in 2013, of the one thousand dollars paid by the Brazilian government per doctor, 400 dollars would go to the doctor and 600 to the Cuban government (these numbers would be revised in 2014 after outrage), with the Cuban medics being the only ones in the program prohibited to bring their families to the country. The president of the Brazilian union of medics, FENAM, said that the program had "characteristics of slavery".

According to a 2019 The New York Times article, sixteen Cuban doctors from Mission Barrio Adentro in Venezuela denied medicine and other treatments in order to secure votes for the United Socialist Party of Venezuela (PSUV) during elections through coercion. The report said this occurred during 2018 Venezuelan presidential election in which Nicolás Maduro won reelection. Cuban doctors would have been instructed to go door to door, warning residents that medical treatments would be cut off if they did not vote for Maduro. They were also asked to register people into the Venezuelan government homeland card, to secure medical services, and refuse treatment to those who did not apply for it. Some doctors report having provided counterfeit ID cards to patients to be able to vote. According to four doctors, the Maduro administration established electoral command centers next to clinics led by members of the PSUV to dispatch doctors to pressure residents.

According to Human Rights Watch "the Cuban government imposes draconian rules on doctors deployed in medical missions globally that violate their fundamental rights".

== Defection of Cuban medical professionals ==
In the summer of 2000, two Cuban doctors working in Zimbabwe denounced the Cuban government and declared their intention to defect to Canada. After submitting their applications, they were assigned to a Zimbabwean refugee camp near Harare. The doctors left the camp nine days later, unaware that this was illegal under Zimbabwean law. Zimbabwean police arrested the doctors and took them to the O. R. Tambo International Airport in South Africa for deportation back to Cuba. The doctors gave a note to the flight attendants stating that they were being kidnapped, leading South African authorities to demand that the doctors and police return to Zimbabwe. The pair were briefly imprisoned upon returning to Harare but were allowed to continue their refugee application process. They fled to Sweden in July and eventually received asylum in the United States. The case drew attention from the international press and the United Nations High Commissioner for Refugees criticized Zimbabwe for violating the rights of the doctors as refugees. A spokesperson for the Cuban government said Cuba was not involved in the attempted deportation and has no "authority to extract people from one country and take them to another".

According to a 2007 paper published in The Lancet medical journal, "growing numbers of Cuban doctors sent overseas to work are defecting to the USA", some via Colombia, where they have sought temporary asylum. In February 2007, at least 38 doctors were requesting asylum in the U.S. embassy in Bogotá after asylum was denied by the Colombian government. Cuban doctors who defected said that they were monitored by "minders" and subject to curfew.

=== Cuban Medical Professional Parole program ===
In August 2006 the United States under George W. Bush created the Cuban Medical Professional Parole program (CMPP), specifically targeting Cuban medical personnel and encouraging them to defect while working outside Cuba. From an estimated 40,000 eligible medical personnel, over 1000 had entered the United States under the program by October 2007, according to the chief of staff for U.S. Rep. Lincoln Díaz-Balart. By 2017, more than 7000 had entered the program. An estimated 2% of Cuban medical personnel defected between 2006 to 2017. The promised fast-track visa was not always forthcoming, with at least one applicant having to wait a year for his visa; although according to Julio César Alfonso of the Cuban dissident organisation "Outside the Barrio," the U.S. government has rejected only a handful of the hundreds of applications for visas. Critics of the US program described it as "immoral" because it takes medical professionals from the world's poorest nations to one of the world's wealthiest nations. On 12 January 2017, President Obama announced the end of the program, saying that both Cuba and the US work to "combat diseases that endanger the health and lives of our people. By providing preferential treatment to Cuban medical personnel, the medical parole program contradicts those efforts, and risks harming the Cuban people".

== See also ==
- CARICOM
- Cuban military internationalism
- Humanitarianism in Africa
- List of medical schools in the Caribbean
- Médecins Sans Frontières

== Sources ==
- Robert Huish and John M. Kirk (2007), "Cuban Medical Internationalism and the Development of the Latin American School of Medicine", Latin American Perspectives, 34; 77 doi:10.1177/0094582x07308119
- C Muntaner, RM Guerra-Salazar, J Benach and F Armada,(2006) "Venezuela's barrio adentro: an alternative to neoliberalism" in health care, Int J Health Services 36(4), pp. 803–811 doi:10.2190/c4ew-x8rp-gum4-p5ad
- Cooper R.S., Kennelly J.F., Ordunez-Garcia P., (2006) "Health in Cuba", International Journal of Epidemiology, 35 (4), pp. 817–824.
- De Vos et al. (2007), "Cuba's International Cooperation in Health: an Overview", International Journal of Health Services, Volume 37, Number 4, Pages 761–776 doi:10.2190/HS.37.4.k
- John M. Kirk and H. Michael Erisman (2009), Cuban Medical Internationalism: Origins, Evolution, and Goals, Palgrave Macmillan ISBN 978-0-230-62222-7
