= CimaVax-EGF =

Vaccine used to treat cancer

Hu-rhEGF-rP64k/Mont
Vaccine description
- Target: Human epidermal growth factor
- Vaccine type: protein "subunit" / conjugate

Clinical data
- Trade names: CimaVax-EGF; CIMAVAX
- Other names: recombinant human EGF-rP64K/montanide ISA 51 vaccine
- Routes of administration: intramuscular

Legal status
- Legal status: Not approved / Rx-only

Identifiers
- DrugBank: DB15781

CimaVax-EGF is a vaccine used to treat cancer, specifically non-small-cell lung carcinoma (NSCLC). CIMAvax-EGF is composed of recombinant human epidermal growth factor (EGF) conjugated to a protein carrier.

The vaccine was developed by the Center of Molecular Immunology, Havana, Cuba, and made available to the Cuban population in 2011. There are agreements in place to test it in the United States, Japan, and some European countries. It is currently available in Cuba, Belarus, Colombia, Bosnia and Herzegovina, Peru and Paraguay. In October 2015 Serbia's Institute of Virology, Vaccines and Sera (AKA Torlak Institute) signed a memorandum for use in 30 patients as part of a study. CimaVax is relatively cheap to produce and store, and has low toxicity. It costs approximately US$1 per shot to manufacture. Side effects of the vaccine appear to be mild, and include chills, fever, and feeling sick.

== Mechanism ==
CimaVax is an active vaccine with which patients are immunized with epidermal growth factor (EGF), thus raising antibodies targeting EGF itself. The EGF is chemically linked to the Neisseria meningitidis outer protein P64k for immunogenicity; Montanide ISA 51 is used as an adjuvant to potentiate the immune response. The epidermal growth factor receptor (EGFR) is hijacked by many types of cancer, including cancers of the lung, colon, kidney, and head and neck. By raising antibodies against EGF, which is EGFR's major ligand, the concentrations of EGF in the blood are reduced. Thus CimaVax does not target the cancer cells directly, but is expected to work against these cancers by denying the cancers the growth stimulus they require. For this reason, the Roswell Park Comprehensive Cancer Center group thinks that it may prove most useful as a preventive vaccine rather than as a cancer therapy per se.

== Research ==
=== Cuba ===
Early trials showed a trend towards improved survival among vaccinated test subjects. A direct correlation between the level of antibodies that a vaccinated patient raises against EGF and survival has been observed in several trials, and in one of the largest trials there was also an age-dependence, with only subjects under the age of 60 benefiting in terms of survival. More antibodies are raised when the vaccine is formulated with Montanide ISA 51 rather than aluminum hydroxide as an adjuvant, and when patients receive a low dose of cyclophosphamide three days before vaccine administration. Cyclophosphamide is thought to temporarily block the body's natural immune tolerance to EGF, thereby increasing antibody titers.

Researchers caution that the early results to date have been in relatively small, early-stage trials with patients that were carefully selected based on predefined inclusion and exclusion criteria, and given specialized oncology care; they may therefore not be representative of most patients who might benefit from the vaccine. It has been urged that CimaVax be tested in patients with earlier-stage NSCLC cancer and in patients who are not candidates for chemotherapy, and that research be conducted to determine which subgroups of NSCLC patients do and don't respond to the vaccine. It has been suggested that CimaVax may also be effective in other types of cancer that are dependent on EGF/EGFR, including many cases of prostate cancer.

In Cuba, CimaVax-EGF has completed a phase IV clinical trial for NSCLC in 2017. It is approved as a "maintenance treatment for patients with stage IIIB/IV NSCLC".

=== International ===
The United States embargo against Cuba forbids US citizens from seeking medical treatment in Cuba. However, some cancer patients from the US have defied the embargo and travelled to Cuba for treatment with CimaVax.

Trials are being organized in the United States, the European Union, Japan, and Serbia. In late October 2016, the United States Food and Drug Administration authorized Roswell Park Comprehensive Cancer Center to conduct a PhaseI/II clinical trial of CimaVAX in patients with non-small cell lung cancer. By the middle of the following month, nearly 200 people had volunteered to be subjects in the trial.

In September 2018, Principal Investigator Grace Dy shared the initial results of the first Roswell Park trial. They found that the combination of CIMAvax with the PD-1 inhibitor checkpoint inhibitor nivolumab was safe and well tolerated in 13 people with advanced non-small cell lung cancer (NSCLC) when administered at the doses normally recommended for each agent individually. Notably, they observed durable responses to the combination treatment in patients who were unlikely to benefit from nivolumab alone due to low tumor levels of PD-L1, suggesting that the combination may work better than either agent individually.

The final results of this early trial were released in March 2019. The results were in line with the September 2018 report, with the additional finding that patients receiving combination therapy in this trial were more likely to develop robust early antibody responses to CIMAvax as compared with what had been observed in earlier studies with CIMAvax alone.

An ongoing Phase II clinical trial (clinicaltrials.gov identifier NCT02955290) has been expanded to include patients with advanced, recurrent head and neck squamous-cell carcinoma, as well as patients with advanced NSCLC but with high PD-L1 levels, who will be treated with pembrolizumab in combination with CIMAvax instead of nivolumab. As of 2023, accrual for this phase II trial is ongoing.

== See also ==
- Racotumomab
