= Gonzalo Aróstegui del Castillo =

Prominent Cuban doctor (1859–1940)

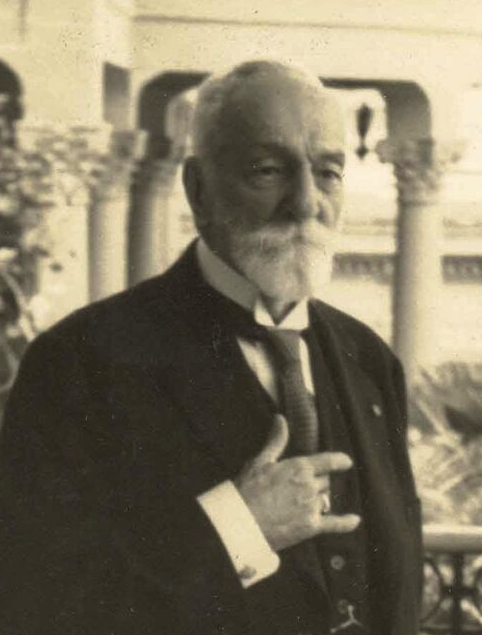

Physician at the Casa de Beneficencia (House of Charity)
- In office 45 years

Consular Officer
- In office 30 years

Personal details
- Born: June 27, 1859 Puerto Principe, Camaguey, Cuba
- Died: November 18, 1940 (aged 81) Havana
- Awards: Medalla de Instrucción Pública de Venezuela (Venezuela's Medal of Public Instruction); Cruz Roja de Brasil (Brazil's Red Cross); "Favorite Son of Camagüey"; "Adopted Son" of Matanzas

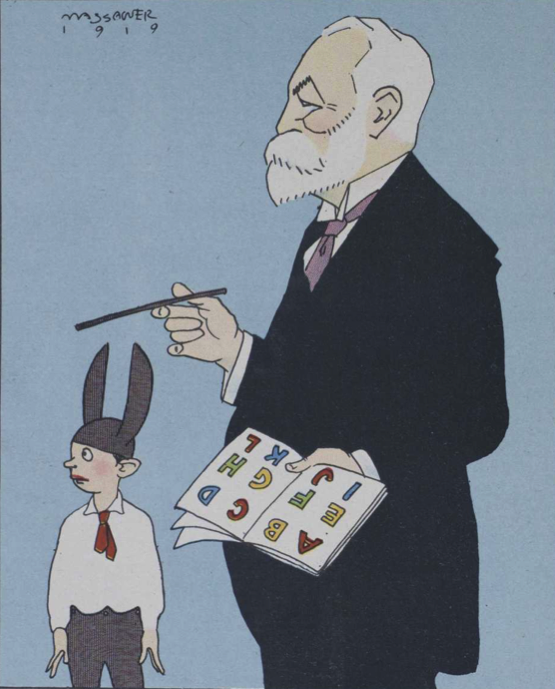
Gonzalo Aróstegui del Castillo, drawn by Conrado Walter Massaguer

Gonzalo Aróstegui del Castillo (1859–1940) was a prominent doctors and figure in Cuba's scientific community. He played a foundational role in the establishment of the Junta Superior de Sanidad (Cuban Superior Board of Health) – appointed by President Tomás Estrada Palma – and the Cuban Society of Pediatrics. He was an active member of the Sociedad Económica de Amigos del País (Economic Society of Friends of the Country). Additionally, he served as President of the La Liga contra la Tuberculosis en Cuba (Cuban League Against Tuberculosis). He was also a member of the Ateneo of Mexico, the Institute of Assistance and Social Prevention, and the Havana School Council and Board of Education.

He was also a prolific writer, who became president of the Association of American Writers and Artists, where he contributed to the publication of several important works, including those of Gonzalo de Quesada, José Martí (in eleven volumes), Rafael Montoro, Emilia Bernal, and Vidal Morales. He also reviewed articles by Enrique Piñeyro for publication in El Fígaro. Upon his death, the association declared three days of mourning and suspended all activities in his honor.

He wrote for numerous political newspapers in Camagüey and Havana, including La Luz, El Pueblo, El Camagüey, Nuevo Mundo, El Triunfo, El País, Diario de la Marina, and El Mundo. He also contributed to and edited various medical journals, such as the Revista de Ciencias Médicas, El Progreso Médico, Vida Nueva, and the Revista de Medicina y Cirugía de la Habana. Additionally, he translated medical texts from English, French, Italian, and Portuguese.

== Life ==
Born in Port-au-Prince, now known as Camagüey, he received his early childhood education in his hometown. At the age of nine, he enrolled in the Institute of Secondary Education to begin his high school studies.

When the Ten Years' War led to the closure of that institution, he continued his education at the Colegio San Francisco, run by the Piarist Fathers. He completed his Baccalaureate at the San Carlos Seminary as an external student and graduated from the Institute of Havana.

He pursued medical studies at the Royal University of Havana, but transferred to Spain during his fourth year, completing his degree at the University of Madrid in 1881 at the age of 22. Seeking further specialization, he traveled to Paris, where he studied at Sorbonne University and gained hands-on experience through internships at the Hôtel-Dieu hospital and other medical institutions.

His academic journey also took him to the United States, where he explored medical practices in New York. There, he visited renowned Postgraduate Children's Clinics, including those of Jacobij, Holt, Kerley, and Caillé, at both the Post-Graduate Hospital and the New York Policlinic.

He later returned to Madrid, initially focusing on general medicine and psychiatry before shifting his attention to pediatrics.

By 1886, he was back in Cuba, where he was appointed as a physician at the Casa de Beneficencia (House of Charity), a role he held for 45 years. During this time, he also provided medical care at Colegio La Inmaculada and the Asylum for the Helpless Elderly.

As a member of the Society of Clinical Studies, he presented his first paper on May 23, 1890, on the mental state of epileptics. His research remained relevant for years, culminating in his development of a simple and innovative technique for addressing certain cases of foreign objects in the nostrils, which he introduced on November 30, 1935.

On July 1, 1894, he was inducted as a full academic member of the Medicine Section of the Royal Academy of Medical, Physical, and Natural Sciences of Havana, after presenting his work entitled: Conditions of Medical Production in Cuba. From December 17, 1894 to January 26, 1896, he served as director of the Academy's annals, and as the Academy's librarian from March 22, 1903, to April 28, 1905. On May 11, 1923, he was appointed director of the Medicine, Dentistry, and Veterinary Section, a position he held until his death.

As an academician, he was appointed to represent the institution on numerous occasions, including: the burial of the remains of Federico Capdevila (1903); the National Commission for Intellectual Cooperation (1939); and the commission to Stimulate the Fight Against Drugs (1935), among others. Likewise, he was commissioned to deliver scientific speeches at special commemorations, such as the anniversary of the founding of the Royal Academy of Havana on May 19, 1904, and the tribute session to the Honorary Academician and Secretary of the Academy, Dr. Luis Montané, on the occasion of the first anniversary of his death in 1938.

Recognized for his authority in the field, he participated in academic evaluation panels for teaching positions at institutions including the Normal Schools of Havana, Pinar del Río, Matanzas, and Camagüey, as well as the Schools of Medicine, Pharmacy, Letters, and Philosophy at the University of Havana. In 1938 and 1939, he was part of the jury for the National Literature Award, organized by the Ministry of Education.

In 1919, he was appointed Secretary of Public Instruction and Fine Arts. During his tenure, he played a crucial role in founding the Institutes of Camagüey and Matanzas, earning the titles "Favorite Son of Camagüey" and "Adoptive Son of Matanzas." As part of his official duties, he represented the government at the 160th-anniversary commemoration of the Academy of Sciences of Havana in 1921.
