= Operación Milagro =

Cuban Humanitarian project

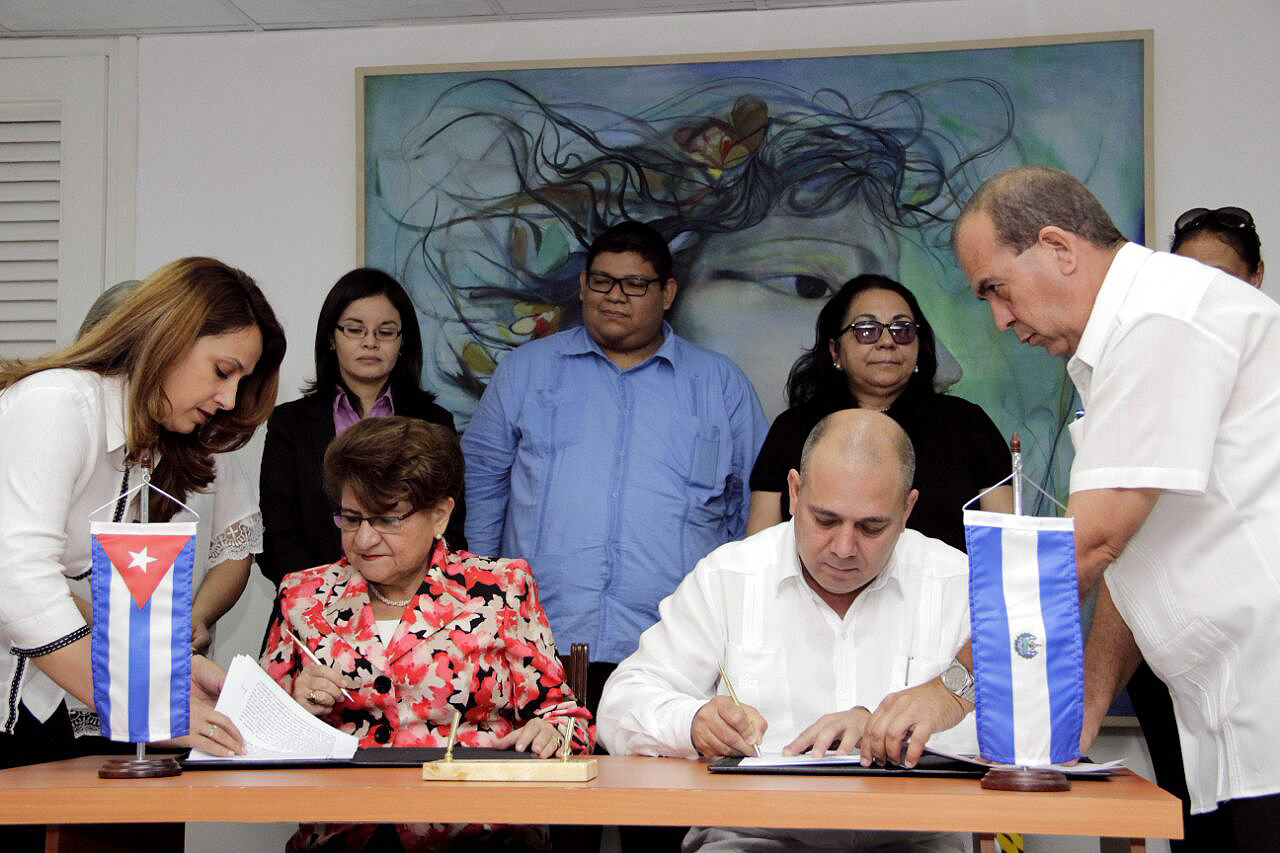
- Violeta Menjivar, minister of health in El Salvador (left) and minister of health in Cuba Roberto Morales (right) signing an agreement regarding eyecare through the program.
- English name: Operation Miracle
- Time: 2004–2026
- Location: Cuba and Venezuela (domestic), Latin America and Africa (foreign missions)
- Organized by: The Governments of Cuba and Venezuela
- Outcome: 3 million patients cured of visual impairment (2015)

Operación Milagro (English: Operation Miracle; also Misión Milagro in Venezuela) is a program of international solidarity launched in 2004 by the governments of Cuba and Venezuela to provide free medical treatment for people with eye problems. It additionally provides the countries it operates in with new medical equipment and infrastructure. By 2019, over 4 million people in 34 countries had received free treatment through the program. The program is integrated into the programs of the ALBA.

While in the initial phase of the program patients were transported to Cuba to be attended there, by 2017 there were 69 ophthalmological centers in 15 countries, carrying out vision-saving and restoring surgery.

== Origins ==
Vision impairment is a greater issue in the Global South, as in 2015 ninety percent of all visually impaired people lived in the developing world. Latin America specifically struggles with a lack of access to healthcare and malnourishment, directly affecting the eyesight of millions in the region. Eye surgeries can cost upwards of $10,000 in medical costs. Issues regarding poor medical systems has led to many of the twentieth century Latin American revolutions addressing gaps in medicine. Since the Cuban Revolution, the government in Cuba has committed itself to advances in healthcare. This includes internationalist missions to Latin America and Africa, which have been an aspect of Cuba's foreign policy and relationship to the Global South during the twentieth century.

In the post-Soviet world, Cuban medical internationalism has greatly expanded for both political recognition and economic incentive. After Hugo Chávez became the President of Venezuela in 1998, Cuba and Venezuela began an organization in 2003 called the ALBA, economically and politically connecting left-wing Latin American governments. To combat illiteracy, the two governments created an initiative called "Yo, sí puedo," or "Yes, I can." However, the program reached a roadblock, as poor vision from a lack access to healthcare in Latin America hampered the ability to read. In 2004, the Cuban and Venezuelan governments then reached an agreement to create a new program to combat the issue of poor vision and blindness, known as Operación Milagro, or Operation Miracle.

== Phases and objectives ==
Operación Milagro can be characterized by three "distinct phases" in its history. The first deals with relations solely between Cuba and Venezuela, that being from 2004 to 2005. During that period, 14,000 Venezuelans were treated in Havana. The first Venezuelan patients were flown to Pando Ferrer Hospital in Havana for treatment.

The second phase occurred in 2005, where Cuba greatly expanded its scope of patients and medical infrastructure, encompassing twenty countries in Latin America. The last phase, starting in 2006, has led to Cuba building eyecare centers in countries where patients are treated, as well as expansion of the program into Africa. By 2008, one million had been treated by the program, and two million received care by 2011. Over 4 million people in 34 countries had received free surgery through the program by 2019.

The program's main objective is to provide eyecare at no cost to any of the patients, largely through Cuban medical personnel and Venezuelan subsidization. A crucial aspect of this main goal is creating the medical systems in the "host nation" in order to ensure that the patients in question are not relying solely on the Cuban government. Operación Milagro achieves this through the creation of ophthalmological centers throughout Latin America, including the José Martí Ophthalmology Clinic in Uruguay. Clinics like in Uruguay will scout out patients in rural areas, performing surgeries that would cost at least $5,000 for free. Hospital Saint Bois in Uruguay, which houses the José Martí Ophthalmology Clinic, reported 50,000 surgeries in seven years.

In accordance with Cuban internationalist medical programs created at this time, an ulterior motive to the program is political legitimacy for Cuba and greater economic agency. Working in programs like Operación Milagro instills patriotism in Cuban doctors, furthered by the Cuban government's monetary incentives for participating personnel. The program also fits within the ALBA, strengthening economic ties with Venezuela in the face of the U.S. Blockade. The United States embargo on Cuba is also a major catalyst for the economic union between Cuba and Venezuela, as Venezuela helps to purchase the medical capital needed to perform the surgeries in Cuba and elsewhere.

== Impacts ==
=== International reaction ===
In May 2006, Prime Minister Kenny Anthony of Saint Lucia praised the Cuban government for its ongoing medical support through the program, 1,700 Saint Lucians had been operated on in Cuba and a further 14,000 operated on in St. Lucia. He stated that although Cuba had taken on millions of dollars in costs to treat St. Lucians, it had not asked Saint Lucia for any funding.

The United States, critical of the Cuban government and the ALBA's function in Latin America, remains steadfast in attempting to maintain its sphere of influence. Leaked diplomatic cables revealed that the United States government was influencing Mexican president Felipe Calderón to resist medical assistance in Mexico through Operación Milagro. Right wing governments have also shown pushback against the expansion of the program, including Panama, where the government created its own program to combat Cuba's. In Peru, the conservative government of Alan García ended ties with Operación Milagro, also noting that they had their own program, which was not only domestic but also more limited in scope. Other nations have accused Cuba of overtaking their professional healthcare systems, worried that Cuban doctors would overshadow medical competition.

=== Accomplishments and limitations ===
Regardless of international criticism, the impact of Operacion Milagro has been tremendous, as millions in Latin America, Africa, and Asia have received surgeries and treatment for eye problems like cataracts, pterygium, strabismus, glaucoma, and other ocular conditions. Countries in the scope of the program include Cuba, Venezuela, Uruguay, Bolivia, Guatemala, El Salvador, Angola, Panama, Nicaragua, and Ecuador, among many others. Among the patients of the program was Mario Terán, the Bolivian man who executed Che Guevara. Overall, by 2019, over four million people in 34 countries had been cured of their ailments.
