= Revista Cubana de Cirugía =

The Revista Cubana de Cirugía (English: Cuban Journal of Surgery) is a medical journal of surgery published in Spanish in Havana, Cuba. The journal is abstracted and indexed in Excerpta Medica, Index Medicus, and Biological Abstracts.
