= Revista Cubana de Medicina Tropical =

The Revista Cubana de Medicina Tropical (English: Cuban Journal of Tropical Medicine) is a Cuban medical journal concerning tropical medicine. The journal was first published in 1945 and is published in Spanish, although abstracts are available in English. Electronic versions in PDF format are available of articles published after 1995 online. The journal is abstracted and indexed in Excerpta Medica, Biological Abstracts, Index Medicus, and SciELO.
