= Revista Cubana de Información en Ciencias de la Salud =

- Discipline: Medicine
- Language: Spanish
- Edited by: Jehová Oramas Díaz

Publication details
- Former name(s): Acimed
- History: 1993–present
- Publisher: Centro Nacional de Información de Ciencias Médicas (Cuba)
- Frequency: Quarterly
- Open access: Yes

Standard abbreviations
- ISO 4: Rev. Cuba. Inf. Cienc. Salud

Indexing
- ISSN: 2307-2113
- LCCN: 2016240223
- OCLC no.: 947076510

Links
- Journal homepage

Revista Cubana de Información en Ciencias de la Salud (formerly Acimed before 2013) is a Spanish language journal of medical informatics published by the National Center of Information on Medical Sciences in Cuba. It was first published in 1993 and is the first Spanish-language journal to be published on the subject of medical informatics.

It is published with the purpose of disseminating the results of the research of information and communication professionals, in particular those related to health services in the country, as well as to promote the exchange of experiences among Latin American countries.
