= Banking in Cuba =

This article discusses banking in Cuba and gives an overview of the recent past. For details on the Cuban economy in general, see economy of Cuba.

== History ==
In the late 1800s, banking in Cuba was mainly carried out by merchant firms together with a small number of banks. After the Spanish–American War in 1898, financial organizations from the United States and Canada increased their activities on the island. The North American Trust Company set up branches in Santiago de Cuba and Havana and looked after government deposits and payments during the American occupation. After Cuba gained independence in 1902, the privately owned Banco Nacional de Cuba took over and acted as the government's fiscal agent and depositary. At first, most of the shares in the bank were owned by investors from the United States, Canada, and Europe. The people who set up the bank, Samuel M. Jarvis and Roland R. Conklin, used government deposits to finance their own projects in utilities and construction. The Royal Bank of Canada, which had opened a branch in Havana in 1899, grew by taking over Cuban banks and built up business relationships with North American railway and sugar companies. The merchant banks that already existed also reorganized and expanded as the Cuban economy recovered from the war.

Following the Cuban Revolution of the 1950s, the Cuban banking sector came under the control of the new regime. The new authorities famously appointed Che Guevara as President of the National Bank of Cuba (Spanish: Banco Nacional de Cuba) in 1959. Guevara often retold the apocryphal story of how he gained the job at the bank; Fidel Castro had asked if there were an economista in the room and he had put his hand up – much to Castro's surprise. Guevara had mistakenly thought that Castro had asked for a comunista.

Guevara's appointment seemed somewhat ironic, as he often condemned money, favored its abolition, and showed his disdain by signing Cuban banknotes with his nickname, "Che."

The 1990s saw the restructuring of the Cuban banking system, with new commercial banks created, and a new central bank, "Banco Central de Cuba" set up. The architect of this restructuring, Francisco Soberón, became the first president of the new central bank.

== Central Bank of Cuba ==
The Central Bank of Cuba (Spanish: Banco Central de Cuba - "BCC") functions as the central bank of Cuba. The Cuban government set it up in 1997 to take over many of the functions of the National Bank of Cuba (Spanish: Banco Nacional de Cuba - BNC). Francisco Soberón Valdés served as the Bank's president from its creation until he stepped down in 2009. He was replaced by Ernesto Medina, who had served as president of the state-run Banco Financiero Internacional since 2003 The President of the Central Bank serves ex officio as a member of the Council of Ministers of Cuba.

As with most Cuban government ministries, the Central Bank acts as both banking regulator and shareholder of much of the Cuban banking system.

== Current system ==
Cuba has eight commercial banks, categorisable as follows:

=== Retail banks ===
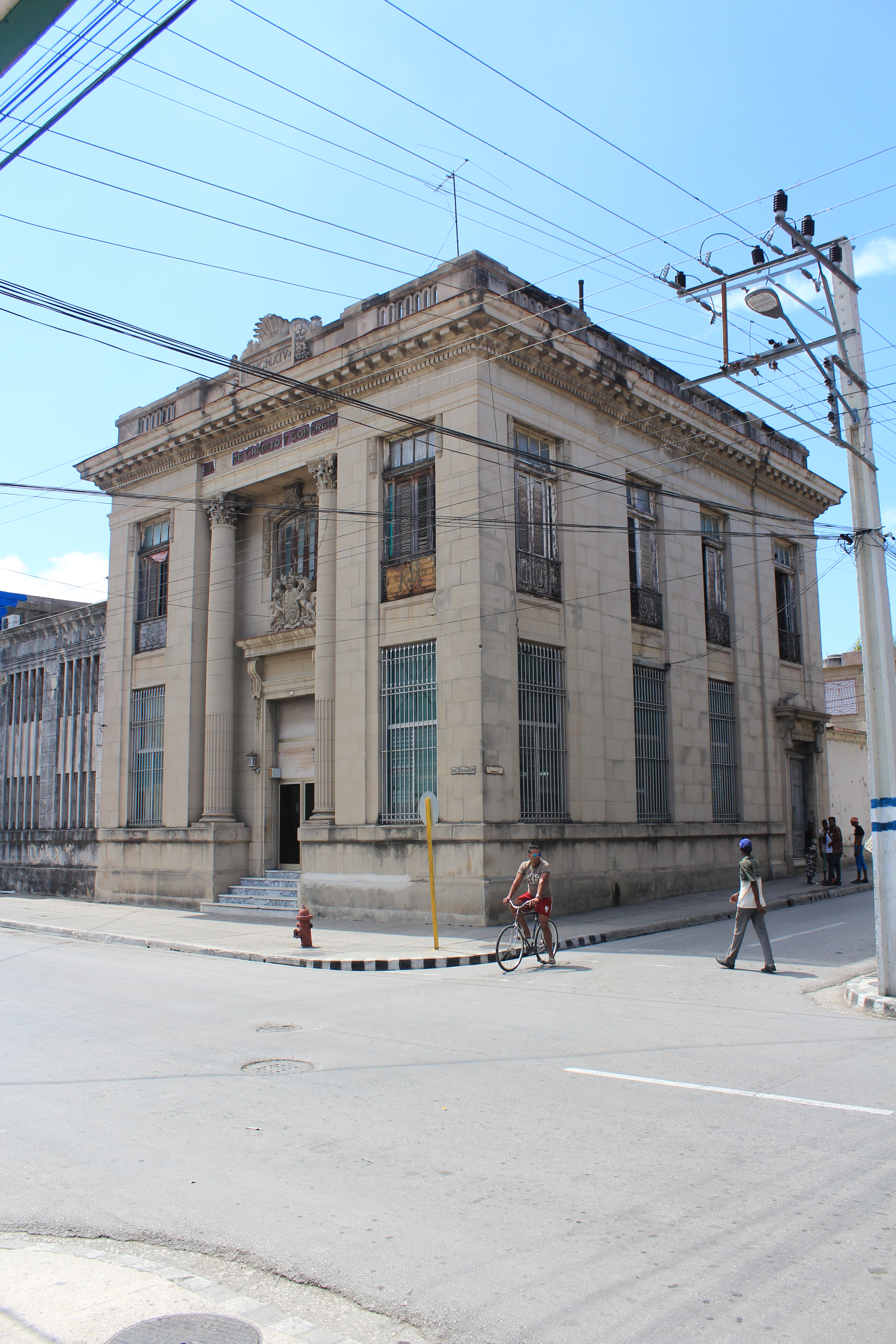
Banco de Crédito y Comercio (BANDEC), Guantánamo, Cuba

- Banco de Crédito y Comercio (BANDEC)
- Banco Popular de Ahorro (BPA)
- Banco Financiero Internacional (BFI)
- Banco Internacional de Comercio S.A. (BICSA)
- Banco Metropolitano S.A.

=== Investment bank ===
- Banco de Inversiones S.A.

=== Other ===
- Banco Nacional de Cuba (BNC)
- Banco Exterior de Cuba (BEC)

In addition, the Havana International Bank is registered in London.

== Non-banking financial institutions ==
The Central Bank also regulates a number of other financial institutions, most notably:

- Grupo Nueva Banca, S.A. (New Bank Group) - the principal shareholder of the following entities: Banco Internacional de Comercio, S.A., Financiera Nacional, S.A., Compañía Fiduciaria, S.A., InCreFin, S.A. It also holds 50.0% in the joint venture Financiera Iberoamericana, S.A. and held 40% percent in Caribbean Finance Investments Ltd. (CariFin) (the latter was subsequently dissolved).
- Casas de Cambio, S.A. (CADECA), formed in 1994, this company operates money-exchange kiosks

== See also ==
- Cuban peso
- Cuban convertible peso
