= Association for the Study of the Cuban Economy =

Professional association

- Company type: Not-for-profit
- Founded: United States (1990)
- Headquarters: Washington, D.C.
- Services: Economic reports, conferences
- Website: www.ascecuba.org/

The Association for the Study of the Cuban Economy (ASCE) is a professional association for the study of the Cuban economy. The association was incorporated on 3 August 1990 by Cuban American economists interested in the post-Cold War prospects for Cuba.
