= Central Bank of Cuba =

Monetary Authority of Cuba

Coordinates: 23.1393°N 82.3533°W

Central Bank of Cuba Banco Central de Cuba
- Logo of the Central Bank of Cuba

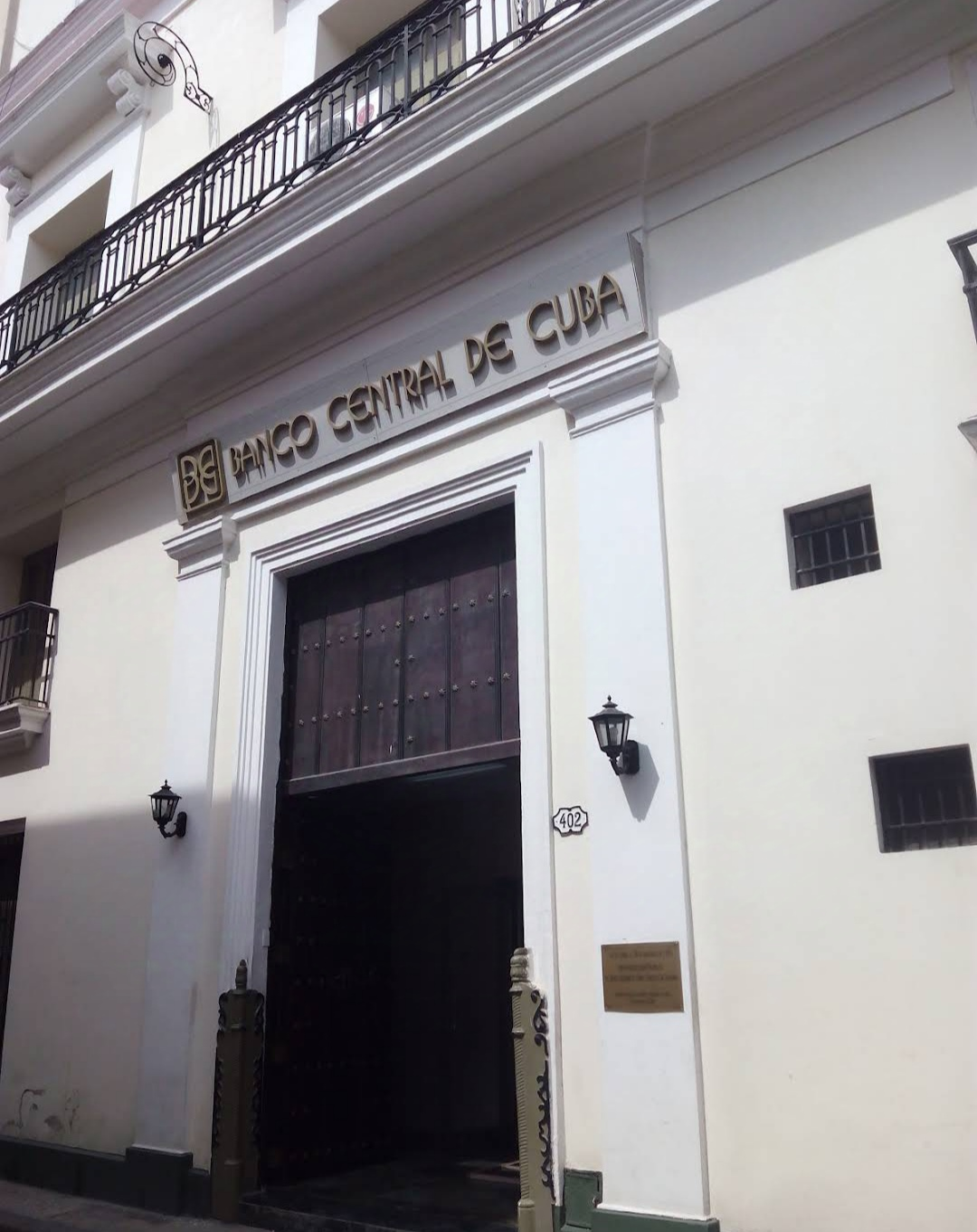
- Central bank of: Cuba
- Established: 28 May 1997
- Ownership: 100% state ownership
- President: Juana Lilia Delgado Portal
- Currency: Cuban peso CUP (ISO 4217)
- Reserves: $8 billion
- Preceded by: National Bank of Cuba
- Website: www.bc.gob.cu

The Central Bank of Cuba (Spanish: Banco Central de Cuba, BCC) is the central bank of Cuba. It was created in 1997 to take over many of the functions of the National Bank of Cuba (Spanish: Banco Nacional de Cuba), which was established on 23 December 1948 and began operations on 27 April 1950.

The current president of the bank is Joaquín Alonso Vázquez.

== Organization ==
The bank is headed by a single president with five vice-presidents:

- First Vice President
- Administrative Vice President
- Vice President, Analysis and Strategic Objectives of the Cuban Bank System
- Vice President, Macroeconomics
- Vice-president, Operations

The president of the Central Bank is a member of the Council of Ministers of Cuba.

== Presidents ==
Presidents of the National Bank of Cuba and of the Central Bank of Cuba.

No.	Image	Name	Term
1		Felipe Pazos	1950 – April 1952
2		Joaquín Martínez Sáenz	April 1952 – 1958
(1)		Felipe Pazos	January 1959 – November 1959
3		Che Guevara	26 November 1959 – 23 February 1961
4		Raúl Cepero Bonilla	1961–1962
5		Orlando Pérez Rodríguez	1962–1973
6		Raúl León Torrás	1973–1985
7		Héctor Rodríguez Llompart	1985–1995
8		Francisco Soberón Valdés	1995–2009
9		Ernesto Medina Villaveiran	2009–2017
10		Irma Margarita Martínez Castrillón	2017–2020
11		Marta Sabina Wilson González	2020–2023
12		Joaquín Alonso Vázquez	15 February 2023 – 2 February 2024
13		Juana Lilia Delgado Portal	2 February 2024 – present

== See also ==
- Ministry of Finance and Prices
- Banco Nacional de Cuba v. Sabbatino
- Banking in Cuba
- Central banks and currencies of the Caribbean
- Cuban convertible peso
- Economy of Cuba
- List of central banks
