= Taxation in Cuba =

Taxation in Cuba is regulated by the Law 113 of 2012. The law establishes the form and basis of taxation in Cuba.

== Income tax ==
Income tax is levied to natural persons who engage on economic activities outside employment for the government. For those persons, there are two tax regimes: one is based on accounted profits, and the other is a fixed monthly fee adjusted per occupation.

The tax regime based on accounted profits is imposed to people with income over 100000 CUP (equivalent to US$4000) and to people in some particular occupations, for example food retailing. In this regime, deductions are allowed for costs up to a limit arbitrarily set by the Minister of Finances, but also for other taxes and some base deductions.

The second form is imposed to the rest of the retailers, and does not require that the entrepreneur do any kind of accounting. This form of tax is possible because the Cuban legislation only allows for rudimentary forms of economic association involving very few people, also, the kinds of activity per occupation and the occupations themselves are limited per law.

The Finance Minister sets preliminary monthly tax quotas based on occupation. If the amount of the preliminary tax paid during the fiscal year is higher than the final tax according to income and tax rate, no tax refund is made. That is, tax refunds are not made in any case.

Income from remittances made from abroad to natural persons is not taxed, but income from contracts taken abroad is taxed at a 4% rate without right to any deductions.
