= Cuban convertible peso =

Secondary Cuban currency used between 1994 and 2021

peso cubano convertible (Spanish)

ISO 4217
- Code: CUC
- Subunit: 0.01

Unit
- Symbol: $, CUC or CUC$
- Nickname: dollar, cuc or chavito

Denominations
- Subunit
- 1/100: centavo convertible
- Symbol
- centavo convertible: ¢ or c
- Banknotes
- Freq. used: $1, $3, $5, $10, $20, $50, $100
- Coins
- Freq. used: 5¢, 10¢, 25¢, 50¢, $1
- Rarely used: 1¢, $5

Demographics
- Date of introduction: 1994
- Date of withdrawal: 1 January 2021
- User(s): Cuba

Issuance
- Central bank: Central Bank of Cuba
- Website: www.cadeca.cu

Valuation
- Inflation: 5%
- Source: The World Factbook, 2006 est.
- Pegged with: 1.00 CUC = 1.00 U.S. dollar
- This infobox shows the latest status before this currency was rendered obsolete.

The convertible peso (sometimes given as CUC$ and informally called a cuc or a chavito) was one of two official currencies in Cuba, the other being the Cuban peso. It had been in limited use since 1994, when its value was pegged 1:1 to the United States dollar.

On 8 November 2004, the U.S. dollar ceased to be accepted in Cuban retail outlets and left the convertible peso as the only currency in circulation in many Cuban businesses. Officially exchangeable only within the country, its value was increased to US$1.08 in April 2005, but reverted to US$1.00 on 15 March 2011. The convertible peso was, by the pegged rate, the twelfth-highest-valued currency unit in the world and the highest-valued "peso" unit. It was a type of foreign exchange certificate.

On 22 October 2013, it was announced that the currency was to be scrapped. On 10 December 2020, it was announced that monetary unification would take effect from 1 January 2021. From that date, the CUC was no longer accepted in many Cuban businesses; it could be exchanged only in banks or CADECAs (casas de cambios), or used in certain shops, for a six-month period. On 15 June 2021, it was announced that the CUC would remain exchangeable in banks for a further six months but that no shops would accept them from 1 July. The final date for exchanging CUCs was 30 December 2021.

== History ==
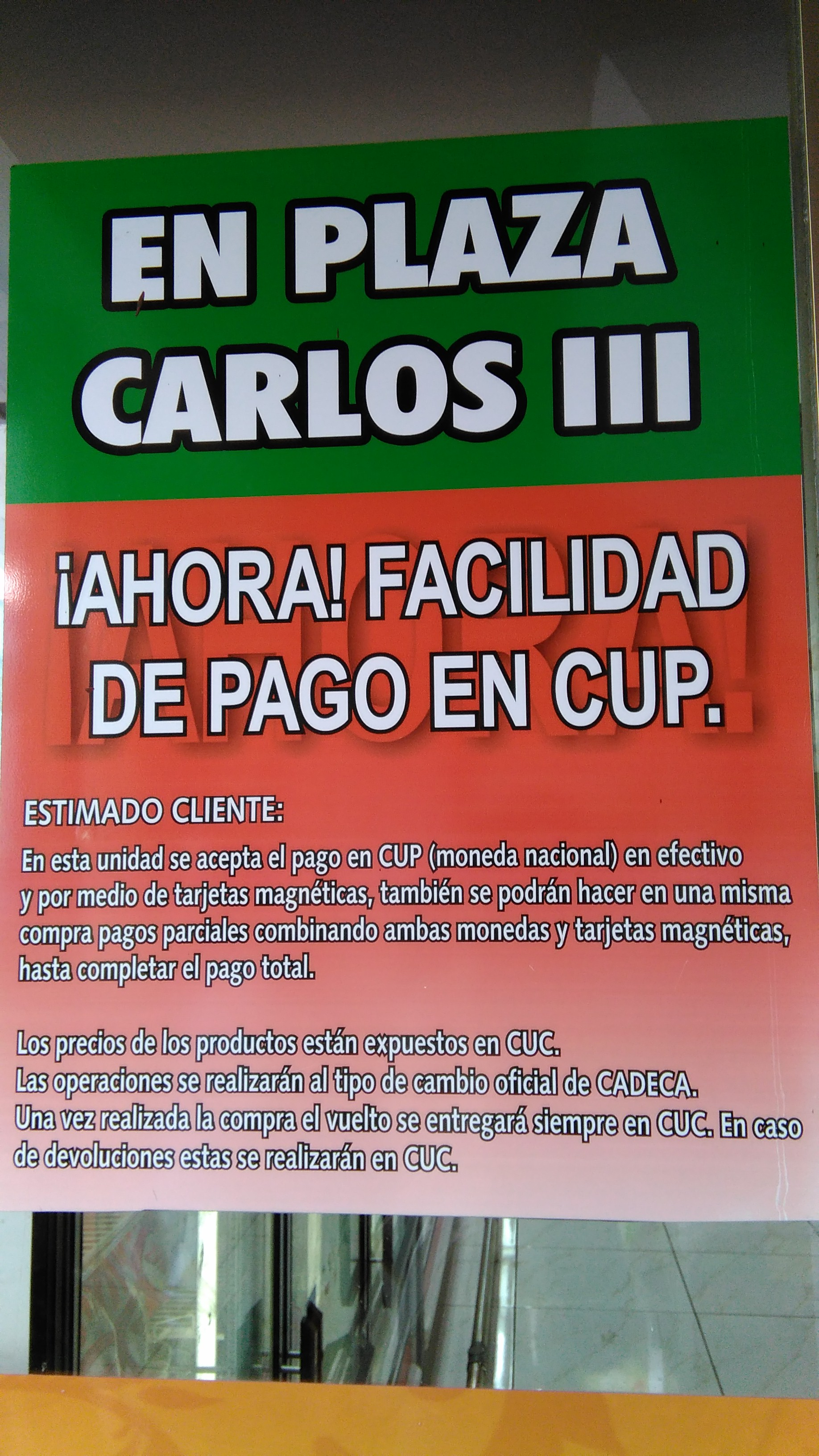
A sign in 2016 informing that prices are in CUC but can be paid in CUP (cash and card admitted). Change was returned in CUC.

In 1981–1989, Cuba used so-called INTUR coins and cheques. Convertible foreign currency was exchanged into these cheques rather than the national currency, which could be used to buy some luxury goods not available for purchase in the national currency.

Also, from 1985, Banco Nacional de Cuba issued foreign exchange certificates of various types.

Because of the economic problems during the Special Period, the Cuban government allowed the possession of U.S. dollars (which had previously been illegal) and began selling goods and services in U.S. dollars, initially for tourism and for luxury items.. In 1994, they began issuing the convertible peso, to circulate together with the U.S. dollar.

This was separate from the Cuban peso (CUP), which was used for staple items. The Cuban peso (CUP) can be exchanged to the convertible peso (CUC) at exchange offices (CADECA) at a fixed rate. Since the early 2000s the rates have been 24 CUP to 1 CUC (sell) and 25 CUP to 1 CUC (buy); but for state bookkeeping purposes, both pesos are valued at a 1:1 rate.

On 8 November 2004, the Cuban government withdrew the U.S. dollar from circulation, citing the need to retaliate against further sanctions from the Helms–Burton Act. After a grace period ending on 14 November 2004, a 10% surcharge began to be imposed when converting U.S. dollars into convertible pesos. The change was announced some weeks beforehand, and was extended by the grace period. It has been claimed that it was because the amounts of U.S. dollars being exchanged were more than anticipated. The measure helped the Cuban government collect hard currency.

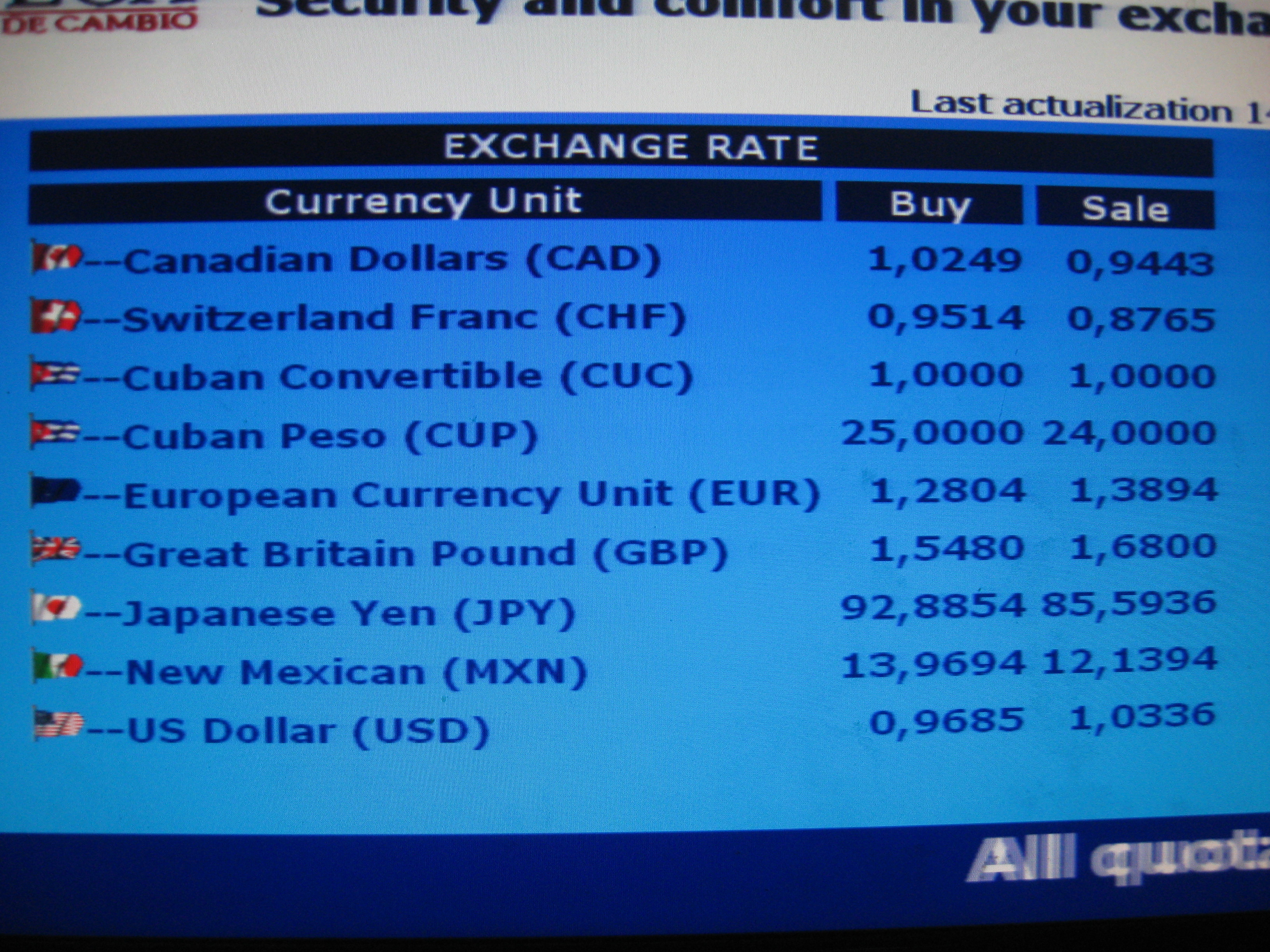
Exchange rates in 2013 at the airport.

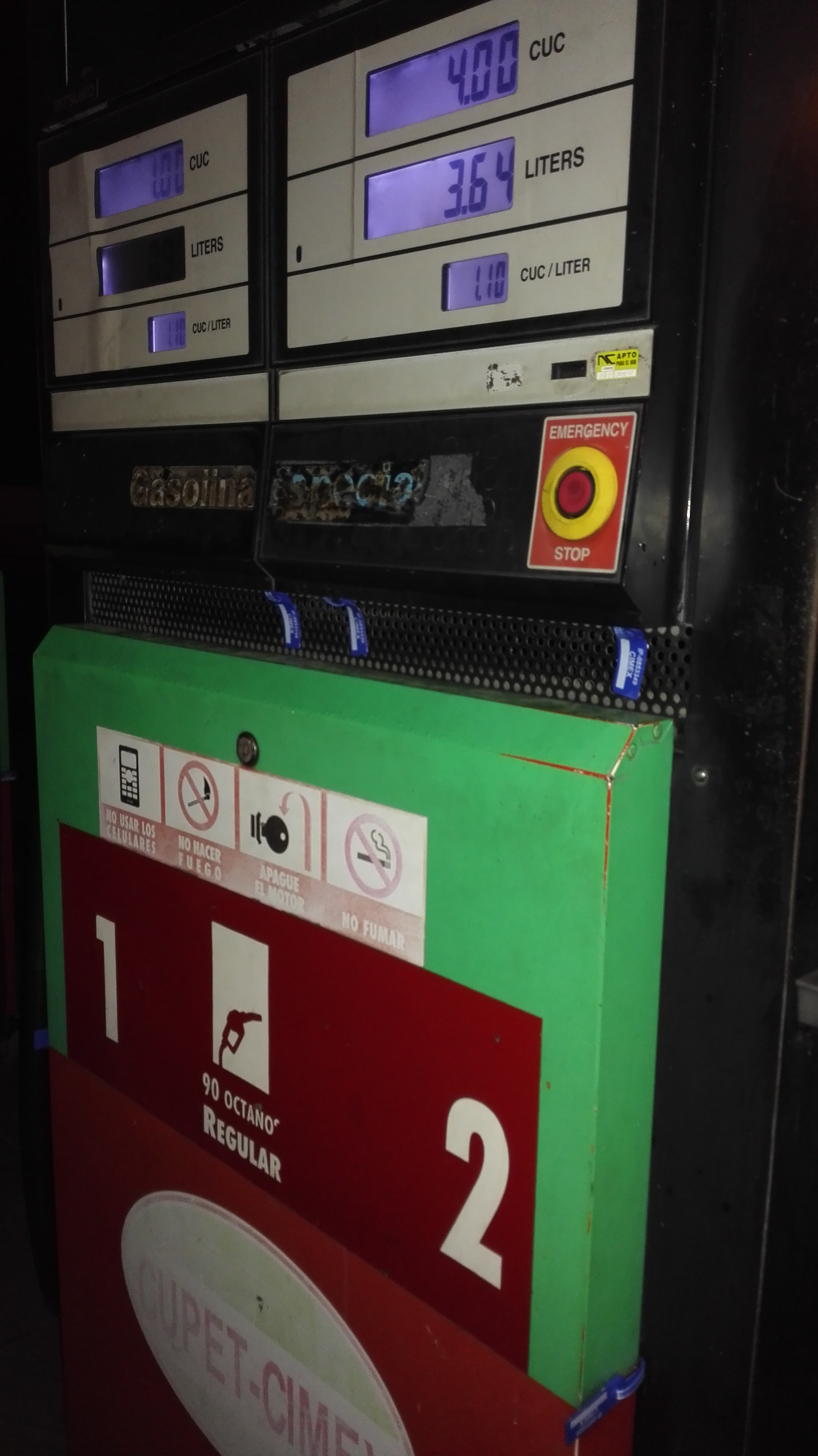
Gasoline pump showing prices in CUC (1.10 CUC/liter) in 2015.

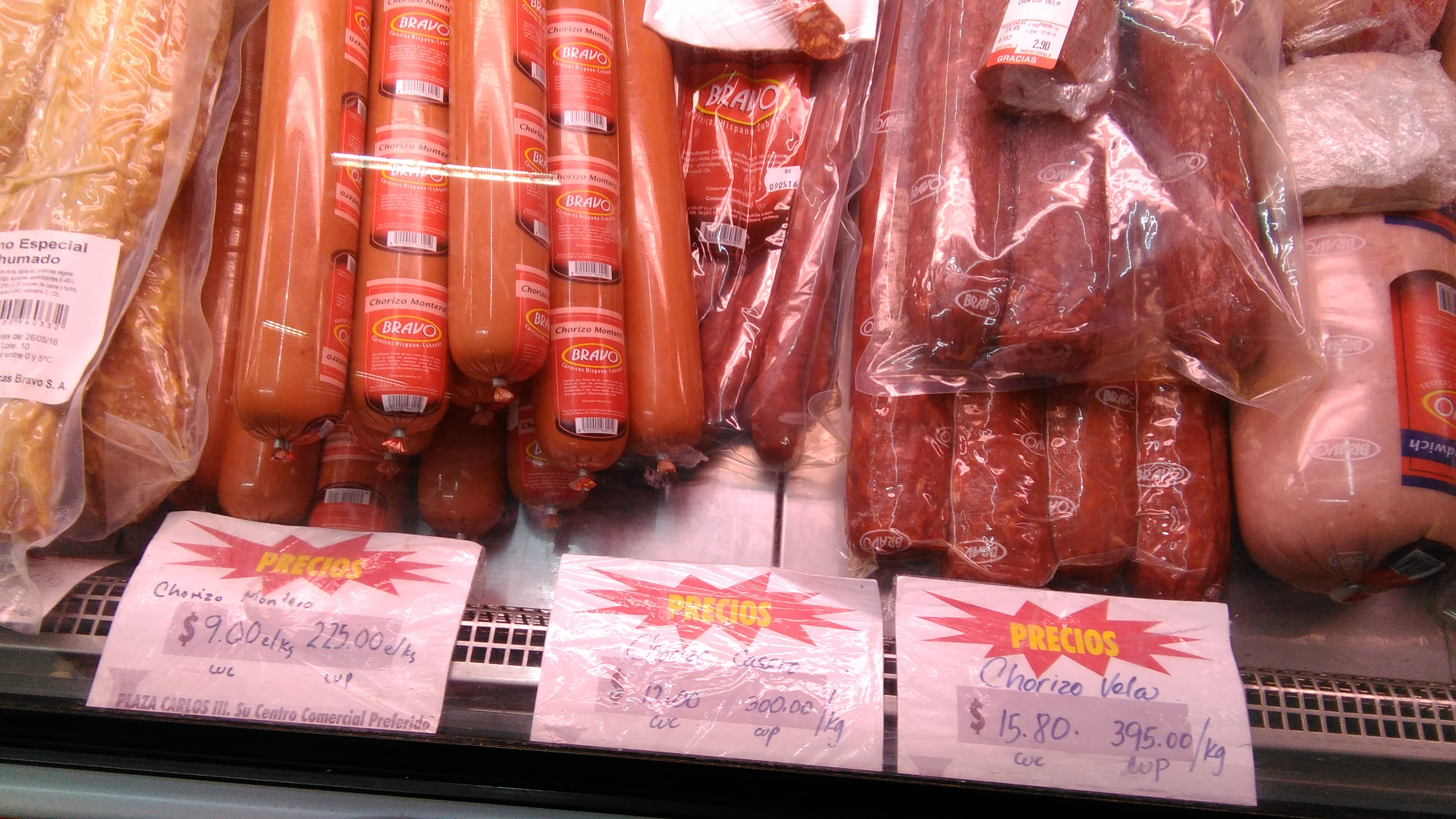
Shop in 2016 showing prices in CUP and CUC.

From 2014, some state-owned shops began to set the prices in both CUC and CUP, and accept payment in either. The 10% surcharge on converting US dollars was removed in July 2020.

Cuba's economic difficulties since the end of 2019 have resulted in shortages of goods in CUP and CUC stores, the opening of stores priced in US dollars and only accepting payment by cards backed by foreign currencies, the waiving of the 10% penalty for exchanging US dollars, the resumption of US dollars as unofficial medium of exchange, and the plunge in the value of the CUC below US$1 in unofficial street exchanges.

== Coins ==
The first minting of convertible coins took place in 1994 with face values of 5, 10, 25, and 50 convertible cents and 1 convertible peso, with their issuance taking place at the beginning of the following year.

Convertible peso coins that were minted in 1994 outside of the country (Canada) have the characteristic that when a vertical turn is made starting from the obverse of the coin, the coat of arms minted on the reverse appears upside down.

But since 1996, these coins were minted in Cuba, with the characteristic that when a vertical turn is made starting from the obverse, the coat of arms minted on the reverse appears in its normal position.

1994 Serie of Cuban convertible peso coins
Image		Value	Physical Characteristics				Description		Years of Issue
Obverse	Reverse	Value	Diameter	Weight	Composition	Edge	Obverse	Reverse	Years of Issue
CUC $0.05 obverse coin	CUC $0.05 reverse coin	$0.05	18 mm	2.65 g	Compact disc with a steel core and a shiny nickel coating.	Reeded	Colonial House, its face value of 5¢ in numbers, and the vignette "CASA COLONIAL".	The Cuban coat of arms, the legend "REPUBLICA DE CUBA", its face value in letters "five cents," and the year of issuance.	1994, 1996, 1998, 1999, 2000, 2002, 2006, 2008, 2009, 2013, 2016, 2017, 2018
CUC $0.10 obverse coin	CUC $0.10 reverse coin	$0.10	20 mm	4 g	Compact disc with a steel core and a shiny nickel coating.	Reeded	View of the Castle of the Royal Force and the Giraldilla, its face value of 10¢ in numbers, and the vignette "CASTILLO DE LA FUERZA."	The Cuban coat of arms, the legend "REPUBLICA DE CUBA," its face value in letters "ten cents," and the year of issuance.	1994, 1996, 1999, 2000, 2002, 2008, 2009, 2013, 2016, 2017, 2018
CUC $0.25 obverse coin	CUC $0.25 reverse coin	$0.25	23 mm	5.65 g	Compact disc with a steel core and a shiny nickel coating.	Reeded	View of Trinidad, its face value of 25¢ in numbers, and the vignette "TRINIDAD."	The Cuban coat of arms, the legend "REPUBLICA DE CUBA," its face value in letters "twenty-five cents," and the year of issuance.	1994, 1998, 2000, 2001, 2002, 2003, 2004, 2006, 2007, 2008, 2017, 2018
CUC $0.50 obverse coin	CUC $0.50 reverse coin	$0.50	25 mm	7.5 g	Compact disc with a steel core and a shiny nickel coating.	Reeded	View of the Cathedral of Havana, its face value of 50¢ in numbers, and the vignette "CATEDRAL DE LA HABANA."	The Cuban coat of arms, the legend "REPUBLICA DE CUBA," its face value in letters "fifty cents," and the year of issuance.	1994, 2002, 2007, 2016, 2017, 2018
CUC $1.00 obverse coin	CUC $1.00 reverse coin	$1.00	27 mm	8.5 g	Compact disc with a steel core and a shiny nickel coating.	Reeded	View of a cabin from the Guama tourist center, its face value of $1 in numbers, and the vignette "GUAMA"	The Cuban coat of arms, the legend "REPUBLICA DE CUBA," its face value in letters "one peso," and the year of issuance.	1994, 1998, 2000, 2007, 2012, 2016, 2017, 2018

In 2000, the 1 convertible cent (1¢) coin began to be issued.

2000 Serie of Cuban 1 cent coins
Image		Value	Physical Characteristics				Description		Years of Issue
Obverse	Reverse	Value	Diameter	Weight	Composition	Edge	Obverse	Reverse	Years of Issue
CUC $0.01 obverse coin	CUC $0.01 reverse coin	$0.01	16.76 mm	0.75 g	Aluminium	Plain	The Revolution Square, its face value of 1¢ in numbers, and the vignette "PLAZA DE LA REVOLUCION".	The Cuban coat of arms, the legend "REPUBLICA DE CUBA", its face value in letters "one cent," and the year of issuance.	2000, 2001, 2002, 2003, 2005, 2007, 2015, 2019
CUC $0.01 obverse coin	CUC $0.01 reverse coin	$0.01	15 mm	1.7 g	Copper plated steel	Reeded	The Revolution Square, its face value of 1¢ in numbers, and the vignette "PLAZA DE LA REVOLUCION".	The Cuban coat of arms, the legend "REPUBLICA DE CUBA", its face value in letters "one cent," and the year of issuance.	2000, 2002, 2006, 2007, 2013, 2016, 2017

A bimetallic coin with a face value of 5 Convertible Pesos was circulated in 2004. It was minted by the Cuban Mint in 1999, in commemoration of the 40th anniversary of Ernesto Che Guevara’s appointment as President of the National Bank of Cuba in 1959. The coin was minted in limited quantities, mainly for commemorative or collector purposes, rather than for daily transactions. While it was legal tender, it was rarely seen in circulation.

1999 (2004 in circulation) Serie of Cuban convertible 5 pesos coin
Image		Value	Physical Characteristics				Description		Years of Issue
Obverse	Reverse	Value	Diameter	Weight	Composition	Edge	Obverse	Reverse	Years of Issue
CUC $1.00 obverse coin	CUC $1.00 reverse coin	$5	23 mm	4.5 g	Outer ring made of armored brass steel, Core made of armored nickel steel.	Reeded	Commander Ernesto Guevara effigy with his face value in numbers on the right. At the top, the legend 'ERNESTO “CHE” GUEVARA DE LA SERNA' and at the bottom, the year 1999.	The Cuban coat of arms, the legend "REPUBLICA DE CUBA", its face value in letters "five pesos convertibles".	1999 (2004 in circulation)

== Banknotes ==
In 1994 the National Bank of Cuba introduced notes in circulation of the new Cuban convertible peso. It is equivalent to one American dollar and allows consumers to facilitate transactions in foreign exchange with a monetary sign of their own.

=== First Series (1994) ===
They were issued by Banco Nacional de Cuba with the face values of 1, 3, 5, 10, 20, 50, and 100 convertible pesos to be accepted by the commercial network of assets and services operating in foreign exchange.

General Aspects:

Front:

- As the main vignette a partial view of monuments of heroes of Cuban independence and liberation wars.
- Different colors for each denomination.
- Denominations in letters, Arabic numbers, and Braille system.
- The series is composed of two letters and two digits, and the number is integrated by six digits.
- The signature of the president of the Banco Nacional de Cuba.
- Year of printing: 1994.
- Text stating its monetary and exchange guarantee for freely convertible currency.

Back:

- Common design to all denominations.
- The vignette corresponding to the national shield of the Republic of Cuba.
- Denomination in numbers.
- Text stating its unlimited legal tender.

Security items for all denominations:

CUC $100 (1994)

CUC $100 (1994)

1. Water mark (Visible against the light José Martí's effigy).
2. Security thread microprinted with the text “PATRIA O MUERTE VENCEREMOS ”.
3. Motive with perfect coincidence front/back (5 points star).
4. Latent Image. The legend BNC can be read at a certain visual angle.
5. Calcographic Microprinted (en relieve).
6. Lithographic Microprinted luminescent under ultraviolet light.

1994 First Serie of Cuban convertible peso
Image		Value	Dimensions	Main Color	Description		Printer	Date of		Watermark
Obverse	Reverse	Value	Dimensions	Main Color	Obverse	Reverse	Printer	Issues	Withdrawal	Watermark
CUC $1 (1994)	CUC $1 (1994)	$1	150 x 70 mm	Dark green, tan, and yellow	Monument to José Martí, at Revolution Square, Havana City.	The Cuban coat of arms		1994	January 1, 2021	Visible against the light José Martí's effigy
CUC $3 (1994)	CUC $3 (1994)	$3	150 x 70 mm	Red, pink, and light green	Monument to Ernesto 'Che' Guevara, at Che Guevara Square in Santa Clara City, in Villa Clara Province.	The Cuban coat of arms		1994	January 1, 2021	Visible against the light José Martí's effigy
CUC $5 (1994)	CUC $5 (1994)	$5	150 x 70 mm	Green, orange and yellow	Monument to Antonio Maceo, at Antonio Maceo Park in front of Havana’s Sea Wall, Havana City.	The Cuban coat of arms		1994	January 1, 2021	Visible against the light José Martí's effigy
CUC $10 (1994)	CUC $10 (1994)	$10	150 x 70 mm	Brown, blue and green	Monument to Máximo Gómez, in front of the entrance of Havana’s Bay.	The Cuban coat of arms		1994	January 1, 2021	Visible against the light José Martí's effigy
CUC $20 (1994)	CUC $20 (1994)	$20	150 x 70 mm	Dark blue, light blue, and yellow/green	Monument to Camilo Cienfuegos	The Cuban coat of arms		1994	January 1, 2021	Visible against the light José Martí's effigy
CUC $50 (1994)	CUC $50 (1994)	$50	150 x 70 mm	Purple, orange, and yellow	Monument to Calixto García e Iñiguez, in front of Havana’s Sea Wall.	The Cuban coat of arms		1994	January 1, 2021	Visible against the light José Martí's effigy
CUC $100 (1994)	CUC $100 (1994)	$100	150 x 70 mm	Red, orange, and bright yellow	Monument to Carlos Manuel de Céspedes	The Cuban coat of arms		1994	January 1, 2021	Visible against the light José Martí's effigy

=== 2004 Series ===
In the year 2004, the Central Bank of Cuba issued its first series of convertible peso bills with face values of 5 and 10 convertible pesos. The printing is flat, and the front and back design is generally similar to the 1994 series issued by the National Bank of Cuba, showing the legend "Central Bank of Cuba" and its logo. The security elements present are the localized watermark with the effigy of José Martí and the security thread with the text "PATRIA O MUERTE - VENCEREMOS"

2004 Serie of Cuban convertible peso
Image		Value	Dimensions	Main Color	Description		Printer	Date of		Watermark
Obverse	Reverse	Value	Dimensions	Main Color	Obverse	Reverse	Printer	Issues	Withdrawal	Watermark
CUC $5 (2004)	CUC $5 (2004)	$5	150 x 70 mm	Green, orange and yellow	Monument to Antonio Maceo, at Antonio Maceo Park in front of Havana’s Sea Wall, Havana City.	The Cuban coat of arms		2004	January 1, 2021	Visible against the light José Martí's effigy
CUC $10 (2004)	CUC $10 (2004)	$10	150 x 70 mm	Brown, blue and green	Monument to Máximo Gómez, in front of the entrance of Havana’s Bay.	The Cuban coat of arms		2004	January 1, 2021	Visible against the light José Martí's effigy

=== 2005 Series ===
Once again, the face values of 5 and 10 convertible pesos were issued in the year 2005. The main motifs on the front and back and the predominant colors are the same as the previous issues. For the printing of the main elements on the front, the Intaglio system was used, which gives them higher quality, security, and aesthetics, as well as a tactile relief.

Security items:

- Watermark with the effigy of José Martí.
- Vertically located security thread with the text "PATRIA O MUERTE-VENCEREMOS".
- Latent image with the initials "BCC" visible when changing the angle of observation.
- Continuous microtext with the legend "CUBA TERRITORIO LIBRE DE AMERICA" on the front and back.
- Security fibers in red, blue, and yellow distributed throughout the paper's surface, visible only under ultraviolet light.

2005 Serie of Cuban convertible peso
Image		Value	Dimensions	Main Color	Description		Printer	Date of		Watermark
Obverse	Reverse	Value	Dimensions	Main Color	Obverse	Reverse	Printer	Issues	Withdrawal	Watermark
CUC $5 (2005)	CUC $5 (2005)	$5	150 x 70 mm	Green, orange and yellow	Monument to Antonio Maceo, at Antonio Maceo Park in front of Havana’s Sea Wall, Havana City.	The Cuban coat of arms		2005	January 1, 2021	Visible against the light José Martí's effigy
CUC $10 (2005)	CUC $10 (2005)	$10	150 x 70 mm	Brown, blue and green	Monument to Máximo Gómez, in front of the entrance of Havana’s Bay.	The Cuban coat of arms		2005	January 1, 2021	Visible against the light José Martí's effigy

=== 2006 Socialist History and Achievements Series ===
A new series encompassing all denominations was put into circulation starting December 18, 2006. The Central Bank of Cuba new series of notes themed to "Socialist History and Achievements". The front of the notes are similar to its previous series, but on the back of the notes, instead of depicting the Cuban coat of arms on all denominations, each of the notes now has an individualized design.

A new security feature has been incorporated into all the bills of this new series providing greater security:

- The watermark (image of José Martí on the left) is now personalized with the denomination number of the bill.

On the front of the bills, the monuments to the heroes of our liberation struggles are maintained, along with the main elements that appear in previous issues, displaying great precision and clarity, as well as tactile relief.

Main security features present in this series:

1. Watermark with the effigy of José Martí on the left, personalized with the denomination number of the bill.

Jose Marti watermark

1. Security thread with the text "PATRIA O MUERTE – VENCEREMOS" located to the left of the monument.
2. Latent image with the initials "BCC" that becomes visible in the lower right corner of the front when the viewing angle is changed.

These new bills entered circulation alongside the previous issues, which retained their legal validity.

2006 Series "Socialist History and Achievements"
Image		Value	Dimensions	Main Color	Description		Printer	Date of		Watermark
Obverse	Reverse	Value	Dimensions	Main Color	Obverse	Reverse	Printer	Issues	Withdrawal	Watermark
CUC $1 (2006)	CUC $1 (2006)	$1	150 x 70 mm	Dark green, tan, and yellow	Monument to José Martí, at Revolution Square, Havana City.	CAIDA EN COMBATE DE JOSE MARTI: Death of José Martí in combat at the Battle of Dos Rios.		2006, 2007, 2011, 2013, 2016, 2017	January 1, 2021	Visible against the light José Martí's effigy and number "1".
	CUC $3 (2006)	$3	150 x 70 mm	Red, pink, and light green	Monument to Ernesto 'Che' Guevara, at Che Guevara Square in Santa Clara City, Villa Clara Province.	LA BATALLA DE SANTA CLARA: Battle of Santa Clara.		2006, 2007, 2016, 2017	January 1, 2021	Visible against the light José Martí's effigy and number "3".
	CUC $5 (2006)	$5	150 x 70 mm	Green, orange and yellow	Monument to Antonio Maceo, at Antonio Maceo Park in front of Havana’s Sea Wall, Havana City.	PROTESTA DE BARAGUA: Cuban general Antonio Maceo Grajales and Spanish Captain General Arsenio Martínez Campos in hammocks.		2006, 2007, 2008, 2011, 2012, 2013, 2017	January 1, 2021	Visible against the light José Martí's effigy and number "5".
	CUC $10 (2006)	$10	150 x 70 mm	Brown, blue and green	Monument to Máximo Gómez, in front of the entrance of Havana’s Bay.	REVOLUCION ENERGETICA: Electric power plant, pick-up truck, and linesman.		2006, 2007, 2008, 2011, 2012, 2013	January 1, 2021	Visible against the light José Martí's effigy and number "10".
	CUC $20 (2006)	$20	150 x 70 mm	Dark blue, light blue, and yellow/green	Monument to Camilo Cienfuegos.	OPERACION MILAGRO: Eye surgeons performing a procedure and passengers deplaning from a jet.		2006, 2008	January 1, 2021	Visible against the light José Martí's effigy and number "20".
	CUC $50 (2006)	$50	150 x 70 mm	Purple, orange, and yellow	Monument to Calixto García e Iñiguez, in front of Havana’s Sea Wall.	LA BATALLA DE IDEAS: Marchers carrying flags and banners that read “TRINCHERAS DE IDEAS VALEN MAS QUE TRINCHERAS DE PIEDRA” and “LA BATALLA DE IDEAS”.		2006, 2007, 2011	January 1, 2021	Visible against the light José Martí's effigy and number "50".
	CUC $100 (2006)	$100	150 x 70 mm	Red, orange, and bright yellow	Monument to Carlos Manuel de Céspedes.	ALTERNATIVA BOLIVARIANA PARA LAS AMERICAS (ALBA): Satellite dish, Latin America map, woman and man reading, oil refinery.		2006, 2007	January 1, 2021	Visible against the light José Martí's effigy and number "100".

== CUC and U.S. dollar ==
The convertible peso was officially pegged at US$1.00 from 1994 to 2005, at US$1.08 from April 2005 to March 2011, and again at US$1.00 since 2011. Since the end of 2019 the CUC traded below US$1.00 in unofficial street exchanges.

From 2005, when U.S. banknotes were exchanged, a 10% tax was applied, plus an exchange commission. The 10% tax was not applied to other currencies; From June 2020 this 10% tax on US dollars was eliminated.

== See also ==
- Central banks and currencies of the Caribbean
- Economy of Cuba
