= 5th Politburo of the Communist Party of Cuba =

The 5th Politburo of the Communist Party of Cuba (PCC) was elected in 1997 by the 1st Plenary Session of the 5th Central Committee, in the immediate aftermath of the 5th Party Congress.

== Members ==
| Rank | Name | 4th POL | 6th POL | Birth | Gender |
|---|---|---|---|---|---|
| 1 | Fidel Alejandro Castro Ruz | Old | Retired | 1926 | Male |
| 2 | Raúl Modesto Castro Ruz | Old | Reelected | 1931 | Male |
| 3 | Juan Esteban Lazo Hernández | Old | Reelected | 1944 | Male |
| 4 | Carlos Aurelio Lage Dávila | Old | Removed | 1951 | Male |
| 5 | Ricardo Alarcón de Quesada | New | Reelected | 1937 | Male |
| 6 | Ulises Rosales del Toro | Old | Retired | 1942 | Male |
| 7 | Juan Almeida Bosque | Old | Died | 1927 | Male |
| 8 | José Ramón Machado Ventura | Old | Reelected | 1930 | Male |
| 9 | José Ramón Balaguer Cabrera | New | Not | 1932 | Male |
| 10 | Pedro Alcántara Ross Leal | Old | Retired | 1939 | Male |
| 11 | Concepción Campa Huergo | Old | Retired | 1951 | Female |
| 12 | Abel Prieto Jiménez | Old | Retired | 1950 | Male |
| 13 | Julio Casas Regueiro | Old | Reelected | 1936 | Male |
| 14 | Leopoldo Cintra Frías | Old | Reelected | 1941 | Male |
| 15 | Pedro Saez Montejo | New | Removed | 1953 | Male |
| 16 | Abelardo Colome Ibarra | Old | Reelected | 1939 | Male |
| 17 | Jorge Luis Sierra Cruz | New | Removed | 1961 | Male |
| 18 | Misael Enamorado Dager | New | Not | 1953 | Male |
| 19 | Ramón Espinosa Martín | New | Reelected | 1939 | Male |
| 20 | Yadira García Vera | Old | Removed | 1955 | Female |
| 21 | Juan Carlos Robinson Agramonte | New | Removed | 1956 | Male |
| 22 | Marcos Javier Portal León | New | Removed | 1945 | Male |
| 23 | Roberto Robaina González | Old | Removed | 1956 | Male |
| 24 | Alfredo Jordán Morales | Old | Died | 1950 | Male |

== Changes ==
| Name | Change | Year | 6th POL | Birth | Gender |
|---|---|---|---|---|---|
| Miguel Mario Díaz-Canel Bermúdez | Added | 2003 | Reelected | 1961 | Male |
| Yadira García Vera | Removed | 2010 | Not | 1955 | Female |
| Carlos Lage Dávila | Removed | 2009 | Not | 1951 | Male |
| Álvaro Lopez Miera | Added | 2008 | Reelected | 1943 | Male |
| Marcos Javier Portal León | Removed | 2006 | Not | 1945 | Male |
| Roberto Robaina González | Removed | 2002 | Not | 1956 | Male |
| Juan Carlos Robinson Agramonte | Removed | 2006 | Not | 19?? | Male |
| Pedro Saez Montejo | Removed | 2009 | Not | 1953 | Male |
| Jorge Luis Sierra Cruz | Removed | 2010 | Not | 1961 | Male |
| Ramiro Valdés Menéndez | Added | 2008 | Reelected | 1932 | Male |
| Salvador Antonio Valdés Mesa | Added | 2008 | Reelected | 1945 | Male |
