= 6th Politburo of the Communist Party of Cuba =

Government body elected in 2011

The 6th Politburo of the Communist Party of Cuba (PCC) was elected in 2011 by the 1st Plenary Session of the 6th Central Committee, in the immediate aftermath of the 6th Party Congress.

== Members ==
Rank	Name	5th POL	7th POL	Birth	Gender
1	Raúl Castro Ruz	Old	Reelected	1931	Male
2	José Ramón Machado Ventura	Old	Reelected	1930	Male
3	Ramiro Valdés Menéndez	Old	Reelected	1932	Male
4	Abelardo Colomé Ibarra	Old	Retired	1939	Male
5	Julio Casas Regueiro	Old	Died	1936	Male
6	Juan Esteban Lazo Hernández	Old	Reelected	1944	Male
7	Ricardo Alarcón de Quesada	Old	Removed	1937	Male
8	Miguel Díaz-Canel Bermúdez	Old	Reelected	1961	Male
9	Leopoldo Cintra Frías	Old	Reelected	1941	Male
10	Ramón Espinosa Martín	Old	Reelected	1939	Male
11	Álvaro López Miera	Old	Reelected	1943	Male
12	Salvador Antonio Valdés Mesa	Old	Reelected	1945	Male
13	Lázara Mercedes López Acea	New	Reelected	1964	Female
14	Marino Alberto Murillo Jorge	New	Reelected	1961	Male
15	Adel Izquierdo Rodríguez	New	Not	1945	Male

== Changes ==
Name	Change	Date	7th POL	Birth	Gender
Bruno Eduardo Rodríguez Parrilla	Elected	11 December 2012	Reelected	1958	Male
Ricardo Alarcón de Quesada	Removed	3 July 2013	Retired	1958	Male
