= 3rd Politburo of the Communist Party of Cuba =

Government body elected in 1986

The 3rd Politburo of the Communist Party of Cuba (PCC) was elected in 1986 by the 1st Plenary Session of the 3rd Central Committee, in the immediate aftermath of the 3rd Party Congress.

== Members ==
Rank	Name	2nd POL	4th POL	Birth	Death	Gender
1	Fidel Castro Ruz	Old	Reelected	1926	2016	Male
2	Raúl Castro Ruz	Old	Reelected	1931	—	Male
3	Juan Almeida Bosque	Old	Reelected	1927	2009	Male
4	José Ramón Machado Ventura	Old	Reelected	1930	—	Male
5	Carlos Rafael Rodríguez Rodríguez	Old	Reelected	1913	1997	Male
6	Osmany Cienfuegos Gorriarán	Old	Reelected	1931	2025	Male
7	Abelardo Colomé Ibarra	Alt.	Reelected	1939	—	Male
8	Pedro Miret Prieto	Old	Not	1927	2016	Male
9	Armando Hart Dávalos	Old	Not	1930	2017	Male
10	Jorge Risquet Valdés-Saldaña	Old	Not	1930	2015	Male
11	Julio Camacho Aguilera	Old	Not	1932	2024	Male
12	Vilma Lucila Espín Guillois	Alt.	Not	1930	2007	Female
13	Juan Esteban Lazo Hernández	New	Reelected	1944	—	Male
14	Roberto Veiga Menéndez	Alt.	Not	1936	—	Male

== Alternate members ==
Rank	Name	2nd POL	4th POL	Birth	Death	Gender
1	Luis Alvarez de la Nuez	New	Not	1938	2015	Male
2	Senén Casas Regueiro	Alt.	Not	1934	1996	Male
3	José Ramón Fernández Alvarez	New	Not	1923	2019	Male
4	María Yolanda Ferrer Gómez	New	Not	1946	?	Male
5	Raúl Michel Vargas	New	Not	19??	—	Male
6	José Ramírez Cruz	Alt.	Not	1922	2014	Male
7	Julián Rizo Alvarez	New	Member	19?	—	Male
8	Ulises Rosales del Toro	New	Member	1942	—	Male
9	Rosa Elena Simeón Negrín	New	Not	1943	2004	Male
10	Lázaro Vázquez García	New	Not	19?	—	Male
