= 4th Politburo of the Communist Party of Cuba =

1991–1997 Politburo of the Communist Party of Cuba

The 4th Politburo of the Communist Party of Cuba (PCC) was elected in 1991 by the 1st Plenary Session of the 4th Central Committee, in the immediate aftermath of the 4th Party Congress.

== Members ==
Rank	Name	3rd POL	5th POL	Birth	Death	Gender
1	Fidel Castro Ruz	Old	Reelected	1926	2016	Male
2	Raúl Castro Ruz	Old	Reelected	1931	—	Male
3	Juan Almeida Bosque	Old	Reelected	1927	2009	Male
4	Carlos Aldana Escalante	New	Not	1942	—	Male
5	Conception Campa Hergo	New	Reelected	1951	—	Female
6	Julio Casas Regueiro	New	Reelected	1936	2011	Male
7	Osmany Cienfuegos Gorriarán	Old	Not	1931	2025	Male
8	Leopoldo Cintra Frías	New	Reelected	1941	—	Male
9	Abelardo Colome Ibarra	Old	Reelected	1939	—	Male
10	Maria de los Angeles Garcia Alvarez	New	Not	1944	—	Female
11	Yadira Garcia Vera	New	Reelected	1955	—	Female
12	Alfredo Hondal Gonzalez	New	Not	1942	—	Male
13	Alfredo Jordan Morales	New	Reelected	1950	2005	Male
14	Carlos Lage Davila	New	Reelected	1951	—	Male
15	Juan Esteban Lazo Hernández	Old	Reelected	1944	—	Male
16	Jorge Lezcano Perez	New	Not	1936	—	Male
17	Jose Ramon Machado Ventura	Old	Reelected	1930	—	Male
18	Candido Palmero Hernandez	New	Not	1947	—	Male
19	Abel Prieto Jimenez	New	Reelected	1950	—	Male
20	Julian Rizo Alvarez	Alt.	Not	1932	—	Male
21	Roberto Robaina Gonzalez	New	Reelected	1956	—	Male
22	Carlos Rafael Rodríguez Rodríguez	Old	Not	1913	1997	Male
23	Ulises Rosales del Toro	Alt.	Reelected	1942	—	Male
24	Pedro Alcántara Ross Leal	New	Reelected	1939	—	Male
25	Nelson Torres Perez	New	Not	1949	—	Male
