= Julio César Gandarilla Bermejo =

Cuban military official and politician (1943–2020)

Minister of the Interior of Cuba
- In office 10 January 2017 – 24 November 2020
- President: Raul Castro; Miguel Diaz-Canel
- Preceded by: Carlos Fernández Gondín
- Succeeded by: Lázaro Alberto Álvarez Casas

Personal details
- Born: 1943 Matanzas Province, Cuba
- Died: 24 November 2020 (aged 76–77) Havana, Cuba
- Occupation: Politician

Julio César Gandarilla Bermejo (1943 – 24 November 2020) was a Cuban politician who served as Minister of the Interior from January 2017 until his death.

== Life and career ==
Gandarilla Bermejo was born in 1943 in Matanzas Province, Cuba.

Gandarilla Bermejo was a founder of the National Revolutionary Militia. He was a vice admiral in the Cuban Revolutionary Armed Forces, and fought in the Angolan Civil War. He was head of the Military Counterintelligence Directorate for 16 years. Gandarilla Bermejo was a member of the Communist Party of Cuba, and a deputy in the National Assembly of People's Power.

In 2015, Gandarilla Bermejo became First Deputy Minister of the Ministry of the Interior, replacing Carlos Fernández Gondín, who became Minister of the Interior. In January 2017, he became Minister of the Interior, succeeding Carlos Fernández Gondín who had died earlier that month, becoming the sixth Minister of the Interior since the role was created in 1961. In the same month, he signed a memorandum of understanding with outgoing US president Barack Obama. Whilst Minister of the Interior, he introduced legislation aimed at repressing opposition and dissent. Some of the legislation was criticised by human rights organisations for allegedly violating freedom of speech.

In October 2019, Gandarilla Bermejo signed a memorandum of understanding with the Russian Security Council. The following month, the US banned Gandarilla Bermejo from entering the country due to Cuba's support for socialist Nicolás Maduro during the Venezuelan presidential crisis. His two sons were also sanctioned by the US. Gandarilla Bermejo did not have a Twitter account, even though Cuban president Miguel Díaz-Canel said all senior leaders should have one.

== Death ==
Gandarilla Bermejo died of cancer on 24 November 2020. He was cremated without a public funeral ceremony.
