= Arocha (surname) =

Arocha is a Spanish surname. Notable people with the surname include:

- Ángel Arocha (1907–1938), Spanish footballer
- Arnaldo Arocha (1936–2022), Venezuelan politician
- Arsenio Arocha (1912–1990), Spanish footballer
- Carla Arocha (born 1961), Venezuelan artist
- Cecilia García Arocha (born 1953), rector of the Central University of Venezuela (UCV)
- César Ignacio Arocha (born 1959), Cuban politician
- Jessica Lopez Arocha (born 1986), Venezuelan international artistic gymnast
- Mercedes Carvajal de Arocha (1902–1994), Trinidadian-born Venezuelan writer, politician, and diplomat
- René Arocha (born 1964), Cuban former professional baseball pitcher
- Rubén Arocha (born 1987), Venezuelan footballer
- Sebastian Arocha Morton, Grammy-nominated American record producer and composer
- Simón de Arocha (1731–1796), Tejano cowboy and militia commander
