= National Defense College of Cuba =

Cuban military institution

The National Defense College of Cuba (Spanish: Colegio de Defensa Nacional de Cuba, CODEN) is a military institution of the Cuban Revolutionary Armed Forces located in Havana, and a center of higher education within the Ministry of the Revolutionary Armed Forces (MINFAR). It is led by Brigadier General Manuel de Jesús Rey Soberón.

== Overview ==
It was founded on 30 October 1990 and is in charge of Cuban military postgraduate education. Among the functions of the CODEN are to direct and develop the educational process in the specialty of National Security and Defense. Many of its students come from the Nico Lopez Central School of the Cuban Communist Party. At the time of its foundation, it was modeled on the Canadian Forces College in Toronto and offers a curriculum similar to that of the American National Defense University at Fort McNair. It the first of the higher level of the MINFAR to receive its certification status, issued by the National Accreditation Board attached to the Ministry of Higher Education. The CODEN currently manages 15 postgraduate study programs. The faculty of the college includes military officials as well as civilian professors. Among the notable visitors to the college include defense minister Leopoldo Cintra Frías, Chief of the General Staff Álvaro López Miera and Iranian ambassador Kambiz Sheikh Hassani. Nearly five thousand Cuban civilians and soldiers have graduated from the CODEN since its creation.

== Notable alumni ==
- Gil Ramón González González, current Vice Minister of Higher Education
- Colonel Marino Alberto Murillo Jorge, Chief Permanent Commission for the Implementation and Development of the Improvement of the economic and social model

== See also ==
- National Defense Research University
