= Álvaro Pérez =

Álvaro Pérez may refer to:

- Álvaro Pérez de Castro (died 1240), Castilian nobleman
- Álvaro Pérez Intriago (1936–2016), Ecuadorian politician, vice-presidential candidate in 2002
- Álvaro Pérez de Lara (died 1172), Castilian nobleman
- Álvaro Pérez López (born 1973), Spanish politician
- Álvaro Pérez Morales (born 1948), Cuban army officer and politician
- Álvaro Pérez Treviño (1930–2016), Mexican politician, presidential candidate in 1994
- Álvaro Pérez Vázquez (1916–1997), Spanish footballer
