= 8th Politburo of the Communist Party of Cuba =

Government body elected in 2021

The 8th Politburo of the Communist Party of Cuba (PCC) was elected on 19 April 2021 by the 1st Plenary Session of the 8th Central Committee in the immediate aftermath of the 8th Party Congress.

== Members ==
Members of the Political Bureau of the 8th Central Committee of the Communist Party of Cuba
| Name | 7th | Birth | PM | Death | Gender | Ref. |
|---|---|---|---|---|---|---|
| Lázaro Alberto Álvarez Casas | Newcomer | 1963 | — | Alive | Male | |
| Teresa María Amarelle Boué | Member | 1963 | — | Alive | Female | |
| Marta Ayala Ávila | Member | 1966 | — | Alive | Female | |
| Miguel Díaz-Canel Bermúdez | Member | 1960 | 1991 | Alive | Male | |
| Ramón Espinosa Martín (Note: Ramón Espinosa Martín, a member of the 7th Politburo, was elected as a member of the 8th Politburo by a decision of the 4th Session of the 8th Central Committee on 26 April 2022. He died of natural causes on 25 September 2024.) | Comeback | 1939 | 1965 | 2024 | Male | |
| Ulises Guilarte de Nacimiento | Member | 1964 | — | Alive | Male | |
| Juan Esteban Lazo Hernández | Member | 1944 | 1963 | Alive | Male | |
| Roberto Legrá Sotolongo | Member | 1954 | — | Alive | Male | |
| Álvaro López Miera | Member | 1943 | 1966 | Alive | Male | |
| Manuel Marrero Cruz | Newcomer | 1963 | 1991 | Alive | Male | |
| Gladys Martínez Verdecia | Newcomer | 1970 | 1997 | Alive | Female | |
| Roberto Morales Ojeda | Member | 1967 | 1994 | Alive | Male | |
| José Amado Ricardo Guerra | Newcomer | 1952 | — | Alive | Male | |
| Luis Alberto Rodríguez López-Calleja (Note: Luis Alberto Rodríguez López-Calleja died of natural causes on 1 July 2022.) | Newcomer | 1961 | 1987 | 2022 | Male | |
| Bruno Eduardo Rodríguez Parrilla | Member | 1958 | 1985 | Alive | Male | |
| Salvador Antonio Valdés Mesa | Member | 1945 | 1965 | Alive | Male | |
