= Gustavo Rizo Airport =

Domestic airport serving Baracoa, Cuba

Gustavo Rizo Airport Aeropuerto Gustavo Rizo
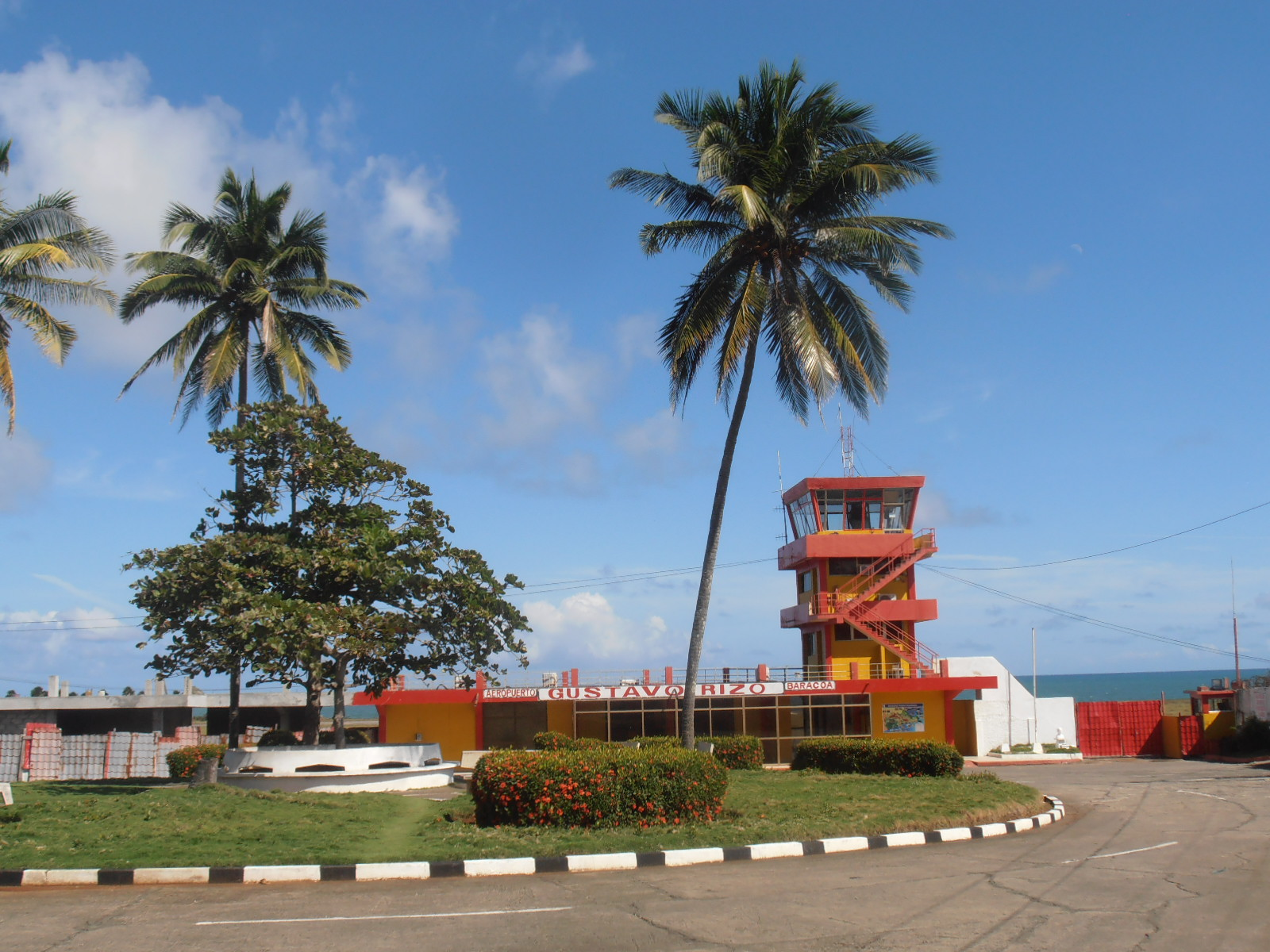
- IATA: BCA; ICAO: MUBA

Summary
- Operator: ECASA
- Serves: Baracoa, Guantánamo, Cuba
- Elevation AMSL: 8 m (26 ft)
- Coordinates: 20°21′55″N 074°30′22″W

Map
- Location in Cuba

Runways
Direction	Length		Surface
Direction	m	ft	Surface
16/34	1,850	6,070	Concrete

Statistics (2013)
- Aircraft movements: 377
- Passengers: 19,524

Gustavo Rizo Airport (Spanish: Aeropuerto Gustavo Rizo) (IATA: BCA, ICAO: MUBA) is a domestic airport serving Baracoa, a city in the Cuban province of Guantánamo. It is located about 2 kilometres (1.2 mi) north of the city and has one runway and a passenger terminal.

== History ==
The runway was damaged by debris during flooding in Baracoa in March 2008, in which waves over 5 metres (16 ft) in height struck the city.

The airport received flights from Havana with Cubana de Aviación until 2018, and by Aerogaviota until 2020. It handled over 19,500 passengers in 2013.

== Infrastructure ==
Gustavo Rizo Airport has a passenger terminal and a concrete runway, 16/34, with dimensions 1,850 by 30 metres (6,070 ft × 98 ft). The runway is not able to handle flights at night.

== Airlines and destinations ==
Airlines	Destinations
Aerogaviota	Havana

== Statistics ==
Gustavo Rizo Airport received 19,524 passengers in 2013, more than it had handled in any past year. Airport officials attributed the rise to Cubana de Aviacion's increase in frequency from two to three weekly flights on its Havana–Baracoa route. The airport also saw 377 aircraft movements in 2013.
