= 7th Politburo of the Communist Party of Cuba =

Government body elected in 2016

The 7th Politburo of the Communist Party of Cuba (PCC) was elected in 2016 by the 1st Plenary Session of the 7th Central Committee in the immediate aftermath of the 7th Party Congress.

== Members ==
Rank	Name	6th POL	8th POL	Birth	Gender
1	Raúl Castro Ruz	Old	Retired	1931	Male
2	José Ramón Machado Ventura	Old	Retired	1930	Male
3	Miguel Díaz-Canel Bermúdez	Old	Reelected	1961	Male
4	Juan Esteban Lazo Hernández	Old	Reelected	1944	Male
5	Ramiro Valdés Menéndez	Old	Retired	1932	Male
6	Salvador Antonio Valdés Mesa	Old	Reelected	1945	Male
7	Leopoldo Cintra Frías	Old	Retired	1941	Male
8	Bruno Eduardo Rodríguez Parrilla	Old	Reelected	1958	Male
9	Marino Alberto Murillo Jorge	Old	Not	1961	Male
10	Lázara Mercedes López Acea	Old	Not	1964	Female
11	Álvaro López Miera	Old	Reelected	1943	Male
12	Ramón Espinosa Martín	Old	Not	1939	Male
13	Ulises Guilarte de Nacimiento	New	Reelected	1964	Male
14	Roberto Morales Ojeda	New	Reelected	1967	Male
15	Miriam Nicado García	New	Not	1959	Female
16	Teresa María Amarelle Boué	New	Reelected	1963	Female
17	Marta Ayala Ávila	New	Reelected	1966	Female
