= 8th Politburo =

8th Politburo may refer to:

- 8th Politburo of the Chinese Communist Party
- 8th Politburo of the Communist Party of Cuba
- 8th Politburo of the Lao People's Revolutionary Party
- 8th Politburo of the Communist Party of Vietnam
- 8th Politburo of the League of Communists of Yugoslavia
- 8th Politburo of the Workers' Party of Korea
