= Torrado =

Torrado is a Spanish surname. Notable people with the surname include:

- Carlos Manuel Pazo Torrado (born 1963), Cuban politician
- Gerardo Torrado (born 1979), Mexican footballer
- José Asensio Torrado (1892–1961), Spanish general
- Osvaldo Dorticós Torrado (1919–1983), Cuban politician
- Ramón Torrado (1905–1990), Spanish film director and screenwriter
