= 2nd Politburo of the Communist Party of Cuba =

Government body elected in 1980

The 2nd Politburo of the Communist Party of Cuba (PCC) was elected in 1980 by the 1st Plenary Session of the 2nd Central Committee, in the immediate aftermath of the 2nd Party Congress.

== Members ==
Rank	Name	1st POL	3rd POL	Birth	Death	Gender
1	Fidel Castro Ruz	Old	Reelected	1926	2016	Male
2	Raúl Castro Ruz	Old	Reelected	1931	—	Male
3	Juan Almeida Bosque	Old	Reelected	1927	2009	Male
4	Ramiro Valdés Menéndez	Old	Not	1932	2026	Male
5	Guillermo García Frías	Old	Not	1928	—	Male
6	José Ramón Machado Ventura	Old	Reelected	1930	—	Male
7	Blas Roca Calderío	Old	Not	1908	1987	Male
8	Carlos Rafael Rodríguez Rodríguez	Old	Reelected	1913	1997	Male
9	Osvaldo Dorticós Torrado	Old	Died	1919	1983	Male
10	Pedro Miret Prieto	Old	Reelected	1927	2016	Male
11	Sergio del Valle Jiménez	Old	Not	1927	2007	Male
12	Armando Hart Dávalos	Old	Reelected	1930	2017	Male
13	Arnaldo Milián Castro	Old	Died	1913	1983	Male
14	Jorge Risquet Valdés-Saldaña	New	Reelected	1930	2015	Male
15	Julio Camacho Aguilera	New	Reelected	1924	2024	Male
16	Osmany Cienfuegos Gorriarán	New	Reelected	1931	2025	Male

== Alternate members ==
Rank	Name	1st POL	3rd POL	Birth	Death	Gender
1	Abelardo Colomé Ibarra	New	Member	1939	—	Male
2	Senén Casas Regueiro	New	Alt.	1934	1996	Male
3	Sixto Batista Santana	New	Not	1927	2009	Male
4	Antonio Pérez Herrero	New	Not	19?	?	Male
5	Humberto Pérez González	New	Not	1937	—	Male
6	Jesús Montané Oropesa	New	Not	1923	1999	Male
7	Miguel Cano Blanco	New	Not	19?	—	Male
8	Vilma Lucila Espín Guillois	New	Member	1930	2007	Female
9	Roberto Veiga Menéndez	New	Member	1936	—	Male
10	José Ramírez Cruz	New	Alt.	1922	2014	Male
11	Armando Acosta Cordero	New	Not	1920	2009	Male
