= Ciudad libertad =

Ciudad libertad may refer to;

- Liberty City (Miami), neighborhood of Miami, Florida
- Ciudad Libertad Airport, first airport in Cuba
- Camp Columbia (Havana), military base in Cuba, renamed Ciudad Libertad after the Cuban Revolution
