= Mokgadi Maphoto =

South African naval officer

Mokgadi Alpheus Maphoto
- Military career
- Allegiance: South Africa
- Branch: South African Navy
- Service years: 1994 -
- Rank: Rear Admiral (junior grade)
- Commands: Provost Marshal General of the SANDF

Rear Admiral (junior grade) Mokgadi Maphoto is a South African naval officer currently serving as Provost Marshal General of the SANDF.

Maphoto received military training with Umkhonto we Sizwe and integrated into the SANDF in 1994. He joined the Naval Police in 1995 and received his commission in 2000.

Between 2012 and 2017 he served as Senior Staff Officer of Provost Services.

== Education ==
He completed the Defence and Security Programme (SDSP) at the Máximo Gómez Command Academy in Cuba.
