= Camilo Cienfuegos Military Schools System =

Type of boarding school in the Cuban Revolutionary Armed Forces

The Camilo Cienfuegos Military Schools System (Spanish: Escuelas Militares Camilo Cienfuegos, EMCC) are a type of boarding school in the Cuban Revolutionary Armed Forces. Founded 1966, it has 20 campuses in many cities, and is an official military high school. They provide pre-military training to students aged 11 to 17. They forge of more than 70% of officers and 50% of the generals and colonels in the FAR. It is named after Camilo Cienfuegos, a Cuban revolutionary who, along with Fidel Castro, Che Guevara, Juan Almeida Bosque, and Raúl Castro, took part in the 1956 Granma expedition. Unlike the Russian Suvorov Military Schools, they are co-educational, modeled on United States military high schools and preparatory pre-college institutes.

== Overview ==
They were created on September 23, 1966, at the initiative of General of the Army Raúl Castro. Honorific names that were considered were that Ignacio Agramonte or Quintín Bandera. The initial purpose was the need for the formation of schools that would nurture the military education centers with young people who would be trained as future officer cadets of the CRAF. By 1968, there were hundreds of students, and later the then boys-only school became co-ed with the admission of the first female cadets. Over its four decades, 3,800 Camilitos students graduated from pre-university education.

The Schools marked their Golden Jubilee in 2016.

== Location ==
The first EMCC campus buildings were located at the entrance of the town of Punta Brava, but soon after it was decided to transfer it to a facility in Playa Baracoa (Bauta) in the old province of La Habana, currently in the province of Artemisa. Other campuses are located in the following localities in the country:

- Guantánamo
- Sancti Spíritus, formed in 1978
- Baracoa (Havana)
- Cubanacán (Villa Clara)
- Civic Wings (Camagüey)
- Palma Soriano (Santiago de Cuba)

The Antonio Maceo Military College, the ITM José Martí, the Granma Naval Academy, the Military Medical University of Cuba and the Comandante Arides Estévez Sánchez Superior Military School constitute the higher military educational institutions that the schools' graduates enter following the completion of their studies.

The Havana City battalion of the Military Schools participates in military parades and ceremonies of state.

== School uniform ==
The Armed Forces service green uniform is worn by cadets during their study days. During parades a full dress uniform is worn which is khaki brown with olive green pants and a side cap.

== See also ==
- Suvorov Military School
