= 4th Politburo =

4th Politburo may refer to:

- 4th Central Bureau of the Chinese Communist Party
- 4th Politburo of the Communist Party of Cuba
- 4th Politburo of the Lao People's Revolutionary Party
- 4th Politburo of the Communist Party of Vietnam
- 4th Political Committee of the Workers' Party of Korea
