= 2nd Politburo =

2nd Politburo may refer to:

- 2nd Central Bureau of the Chinese Communist Party
- 2nd Politburo of the Communist Party of Cuba, 1980–1986
- 2nd Politburo of the Lao People's Revolutionary Party, 1972–1982
- 2nd Politburo of the Workers' Party of Vietnam, 1951–1960
- 2nd Political Committee of the Workers' Party of Korea, 1948–1956
