= Yzquierdo =

Yzquierdo is a Spanish surname. Notable people with the surname include:

- Adel Yzquierdo (born 1945), Cuban engineer and politician
- Rafael Yzquierdo (1885–1942), Spanish singer
- Ramón Yzquierdo Perrín (born 1948), Spanish art historian and professor
