= 6th Politburo =

6th Politburo may refer to:

- 6th Politburo of the Chinese Communist Party
- 6th Politburo of the Communist Party of Cuba
- 6th Politburo of the Lao People's Revolutionary Party
- 6th Politburo of the Communist Party of Vietnam
- 6th Politburo of the League of Communists of Yugoslavia
- 6th Politburo of the Workers' Party of Korea
