= Harry Villegas Tamayo =

Cuban revolutionary

Harry Villegas Tamayo (March 10, 1938 - January 2020) was a soldier and revolutionary fighter from Cuba who was awarded Hero of the Republic of Cuba, Highest Decoration of Cuba. He was one of the two soldiers of Cuba who survived and escaped when Che Guevara himself was killed.

== Personal life ==
He was born in March 10, 1938 in Yara, Cuba. His father was a carpenter and student of Cuban history. He died in January 2020.
