= Roberto Legrá Sotolongo =

Cuban politician

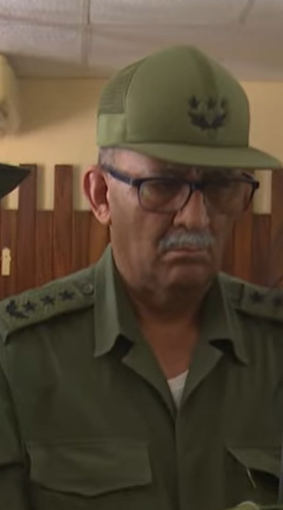
- Legrá in 2025
- Born: 5 June 1954 (age 72); Baracoa, Cuba
- Military career
- Allegiance: Cuba
- Branch: Cuban Revolutionary Armed Forces
- Rank: Major General
- Conflicts: Angolan Civil War; 2026 Cuban Crisis

General Roberto Legrá Sotolongo (born 5 June 1954) is a Cuban military officer and politician who is the current chief of the general staff of the armed forces.

== Military career ==
He graduated from the Antonio Maceo Military College specializing in tactical command. From 1983 to 1987, he studied in the Soviet Union at the Frunze Military Academy and the Military Academy of the General Staff. He served Battalion Commander of Infantry, Commander of Tank Brigade, Commander of the Villa Clara and Santiago de Cuba military regions, Chief of Staff of the Western Army, Director of the Antonio Maceo Military College at the Máximo Gómez Command Academy, Deputy Chief of the General Staff, and Chief of the Operations Directorate of the Cuban Revolutionary Armed Forces. He served on an internationalist mission in Angola as a Tactical Group Commander. He completed the Specialization in Defense and National Security at the National Defense College of Cuba. He was a delegate to the 6th, 7th, and 8th Congresses of the Communist Party of Cuba, and was elected to the Central Committee at the latter. He has been a Deputy to the National Assembly of People's Power since 2018. On 19 August 2021, López Miera was added to the United States' OFAC sanctions list.

== Awards ==
- Ignacio Agramonte Medal, 1st, 2nd, 3rd class
- Internationalist Combatant, 2nd class
- For the Victory Cuba-Angola Medal
- Commemorative Medal "40th Anniversary of the FAR"
- Commemorative Medal "50th Anniversary of the FAR"
- Commemorative Medal "60th Anniversary of the FAR"
- Medal "For Service in the FAR" (10, 15, and 20 years)
