= Julio Casas Regueiro =

Cuban politician

Corps General Julio Casas Regueiro
- Born: February 18, 1936; Santiago de Cuba, Cuba
- Died: September 3, 2011 (aged 75); Havana, Cuba
- Military career
- Allegiance: Cuba
- Branch: Cuban Revolutionary Armed Forces
- Service years: 1958–2011
- Rank: Corps General
- Commands: Minister of the Revolutionary Armed Forces (2008–2011)

Corps General Julio Casas Regueiro (February 18, 1936 – September 3, 2011) was a Cuban politician. He was a vice-president of the Council of State and the minister of defense.

Previously, Regueiro was the deputy minister of MINFAR in charge of economic activity and was in charge of Cuba's holding company, GAE SA, which is the holding company for the commercial activities belonging to MINFAR, the Cuban Armed Forces Ministry. It manages much of Cuba's lucrative tourist industry (such as the company Gaviota) along with agriculture, import-export businesses, retail stores and other enterprises.

On February 24, 2008, he was named as one of Cuba's vice-presidents and as minister of defense, succeeding long-time defense minister Raúl Castro, who was named as President of Cuba on the same day. On this occasion, Castro said: "I have always had criticism for generals in our armed forces, but in 50 years I don't recall having ever criticized General Julio Casas Regueiro". His older brother was Senén Casas Regueiro.

== Military ==
With the creation of the Second Eastern Front "Frank País" in March 1958, he joined the ranks of Commander Raúl Castro. Subsequently, he went to Column No. 6, participating in multiple combats and in the capture of the city of Guantánamo on January 1, 1959. With the victory of the Cuban Revolution, he commanded the headquarters of the National Revolutionary Police, with whose troops he participated in the defense of Playa Girón.

Since 1961 he held various logistical positions in the Revolutionary Armed Forces. He was promoted in 1969 to Vice Minister. He studied at various military schools, including the Academy of the General Staff of the USSR “Voroshilov”. He served as chief of the Eastern Army, chief of the Antiaircraft Defense Troops ا Anti-aircraft and Revolutionary Air Force, substitute for the minister for economic activity, first deputy minister and from February 2008 until his death in 2011 minister of the Revolutionary Armed Forces. He fought in the Ogaden War fighting for Ethiopia as substitute for the chief of the military mission (Major General Arnaldo Ochoa).

He received various national and international decorations, including the title of Hero of the Republic of Cuba and the Playa Girón Order that was awarded to him on April 16, 2001, on the occasion of the 40th anniversary of the Victory of Playa Girón.

== Politics ==
He was founder of the Communist Party of Cuba and delegate and member of the Central Committee since the First Congress until his death. In the IV Congress he was elected a member of the Political Bureau, a condition ratified by the V and VI congresses. Since 1981 he has been a deputy to the National Assembly of People's Power of Cuba, member of the Council of State since 1986 and in 2008 he was elected vice president of the Council of State.

Since 1961 he held various logistical positions in the Revolutionary Armed Forces. He was promoted in 1969 to vice minister. He studied at various military schools, including the Military Academy of the General Staff of the Armed Forces of Russia.

== Death ==
General Julio Casas Regueiro died in Havana, Cuba, on September 3, 2011, as a consequence of a cardiorespiratory arrest. His mortal remains were cremated and they were deposited in the Granma Room of MINFAR until their transfer to the Mausoleum of the II Frank País Eastern Front,

== Burial of the mortal remains ==
Shortly before 8:30 a.m. On Saturday, November 5, the burial ceremony of his mortal remains began. There, Army General Raúl Castro Ruz waited for the relatives who brought with them the urn with the ashes of the Army Corps General.

The Generals of the Army Corps Abelardo Colomé Ibarra, minister of the interior, Leopoldo Cintra Frías, Álvaro López Miera and Joaquín Quintas Solá, Vice Minister of the Revolutionary Armed Forces carried out the last honor guard.

Inhabitants of the II Front, members of the Revolutionary Armed Forces, leaders of the Party and the Government in the province and the municipality, arrived here to, on behalf of the Cuban people bury Julio Casas, who died on September 3.

Political offices
Preceded by Raúl Castro	Defense Minister of Cuba; 2008–2011	Succeeded by Leopoldo Cintra Frías
