= Ministry of the Revolutionary Armed Forces (Cuba) =

Government ministry of Cuba

Ministry of the Revolutionary Armed Forces of Cuba
- Ministerio de las Fuerzas Armadas Revolucionarias
- Cuban Revolutionary Armed Forces emblem

- Flag of the Minister of the Revolutionary Armed Forces of Cuba

- Logo of this ministry

Agency overview
- Formed: 16 February 1959; 67 years ago
- Superseding agency: Ministry of National Defense
- Jurisdiction: Cuban Revolutionary Armed Forces
- Headquarters: Plaza de la Revolución, Havana
- Minister responsible: Álvaro López Miera, Minister of the FAR
- Agency executives: Lieutenant Gen. Roberto Legrá Sotolongo, Chief of the General Staff
- Website: www.cubadefensa.cu

The Ministry of the Revolutionary Armed Forces of Cuba (Spanish: Ministerio de las Fuerzas Armadas Revolucionarias – MINFAR), also known as the Ministry of the FAR, is a Cuban military agency which is the executive body of the Cuban Revolutionary Armed Forces. The current Minister of the FAR is Corps General and longtime Chief of Staff Álvaro López Miera.

== Leadership structure ==
- First Secretary – Miguel Díaz-Canel
- Commander in Chief – Miguel Díaz-Canel
- Minister of the FAR – Álvaro López Miera
- Chief of the General Staff – Roberto Legrá Sotolongo

== Responsibilities ==
The MINFAR directs, controls, and executes the policy of the Communist Party of Cuba and the government regarding the activities of the readiness of the nation to defend itself. It is responsible for the budget of the military, as well as for making arms deals with other countries. This ministry fulfills these obligations in coordination with other government agencies and institutions. The powers and functions of the MINFAR are regulated in legislation from the National Assembly of People's Power.

== Ministers ==
† denotes people who died in office.

No.	Portrait	Minister	Took office	Left office	Time in office	Party	Ref.
1	Raúl Castro	Comandante; Raúl Castro (born 1931)	16 February 1959	24 February 2008	49 years, 8 days	PCC	—
2	Julio Casas Regueiro	Corps General; Julio Casas Regueiro (1936–2011)	24 February 2008	3 September 2011 †	3 years, 191 days	PCC	
3	Leopoldo Cintra Frías	Corps General; Leopoldo Cintra Frías (born 1941)	9 November 2011	15 April 2021	9 years, 157 days	PCC	
4	Álvaro López Miera	Corps General; Álvaro López Miera (born 1943)	15 April 2021	Incumbent	5 years, 197 days	PCC	

== See also ==
- Council of Ministers of Cuba
- Intelligence Directorate (G2)
- Military Counterintelligence Directorate
- Ministry of Foreign Affairs (MINREX)
- Ministry of Science, Technology and Environment (CITMA)
- Ministry of the Interior (MININT)
