= Máximo Gómez Command Academy =

Cuban military institution

Coordinates: 23.174°N 82.247°W

- Spanish: Academia de las FAR General Máximo Gómez
- Established: 1963
- Affiliations: Ministry of the Revolutionary Armed Forces (Cuba)
- Students: Officers of the Cuban Forces
- Location: Havana, Cuba
- Campus: Former convent
- Language: Spanish

Máximo Gómez Command Academy is a military institution of the Cuban Revolutionary Armed Forces. The academy, which is located to the east of Havana, is the principal senior service school for the training of soldiers in the FAR. It currently bears the name of Major General Máximo Gómez, who was a 19th-century Cuban independence fighter. It was founded in 1963 and is under the orbit of the Ministry of the Revolutionary Armed Forces (MINFAR), whose employees are trained by the school. The command academy has been decorated with many military and state awards such as the Order of Antonio Maceo and the Order of Carlos J. Finlay.

== Overview ==
The command academy was founded in July 1963 in the western La Habana Province as the successor to the El Morro Academy, which operated under the former Batista regime. In the 1980s, attendance at the school became an exclusive for those who were preparing to be assigned to the FAR General Staff. In the 1990s, a period when the FAR increased its influence in the management of Cuba's economy, the academy introduced civilian economists who were hired by the MINFAR to spread and teach the economic reforms that they favored. During that same period, the academy also grew increasingly in importance, eventually becoming second in precedence next to the recently established National Defense College, which was modeled on the Canadian RMC and the Canadian Forces College.

Although organized for senior MINFAR officials, civilians who work for the government and/or the Communist Party of Cuba also are invited to attend the courses.

== Curriculum ==
The school's curriculum is comparable to courses offered by the United States Army Command and General Staff College or the United States Army War College. The main courses that are taught at the academy are:

- Specialties in Command and Tactical Staff (1st Degree)
- Specialties in Command and Tactical Staff (2nd Degree)
- Specialties in Command and Tactical Staff (3rd Degree)
