= Carlos Fernández Gondín =

Cuban revolutionary and politician

- Carlos Fernández Gondín

Minister of the Interior of Cuba
- In office 26 October 2015 – 7 January 2017
- Preceded by: Abelardo Colomé Ibarra
- Succeeded by: Julio César Gandarilla Bermejo

Personal details
- Born: 1 July 1938 Santiago de Cuba, Cuba
- Died: 7 January 2017 (aged 78)
- Occupation: Politician
- Known for: Cuban Minister of the Interior (2015–2017)

Carlos Fernández Gondín (1 July 1938 – 7 January 2017) was a Cuban politician. He was a founding member of the Communist Party of Cuba, and served as the country's Minister of the Interior from 2015 until his death.

== Career ==
Fernández Gondín was born in Santiago de Cuba into a working class family. He joined the Cuban Revolutionary Armed Forces in 1958, which was led by Raúl Castro, and fought against Fulgencio Batista and later, against the United States in the Bay of Pigs Invasion. He was a founding member of the Communist Party of Cuba in 1965. In 1975, Fernández Gondín helped Angola to gain independence from Portugal; he was one of the first Cubans to visit Angola, and was appointed second chief of the military mission there. Fernández Gondín was a Major general and counterintelligence chief of the Cuban Army. From 1989, Fernández Gondín was the First Deputy Minister, and in 1993, he became a representative of the National Assembly of People's Power, a role that he held until his death. From 2015 until his death, he was the country's Minister of the Interior, replacing Abelardo Colomé Ibarra, who resigned for health reasons; Fernández Gondín had previously been the Deputy Interior Minister. In 2015, Fernández Gondín met with then United States Deputy Secretary of Homeland Security Alejandro Mayorkas. Fernández Gondín was awarded the titles "Hero of the Cuban Republic" and the Máximo Gómez Order.

== Illness ==
In 2015, Fernández Gondín was reported to have had a stroke, and in 2016, Fernández Gondín did not attend a 55th anniversary celebration for the Cuban Interior Ministry, due to ill-health. Fernández Gondín died on 7 January 2017 from "complications of a long chronic disease." On 10 January 2017, Julio César Gandarilla Bermejo took over the role of Minister of the Interior.

== See also ==
- Ministry of the Interior of Cuba
