= Military Counterintelligence Directorate =

Cuban military intelligence department

The Dirección de Contra-Inteligencia Militar (Military Counterintelligence Directorate) is the military intelligence department of the Ministry of the Revolutionary Armed Forces (MINFAR) of Cuba. It only provides military intelligence for the Cuban Revolutionary Armed Forces, unlike its non-military counterpart, the Dirección de Inteligencia.

It is closely connected with the Russian Foreign Intelligence Service, based upon a June 1993 agreement on military cooperation between the two countries.

It is focused on collecting information on the United States Armed Forces operations at Guantanamo Bay Naval Base. It has an attached elite troop unit: the Special Destination Unit (UDE). Its chief for several years was Major General Jesús Bermúdez Cutiño, as well as General Gandarilla Bermejo.

== See also ==
- Intelligence Directorate (G2)
