= 1st Politburo of the Communist Party of Cuba =

Government body elected in 1975

The 1st Politburo of the Communist Party of Cuba (PCC) was elected in 1975 by the 1st Plenary Session of the 1st Central Committee, in the immediate aftermath of the 1st Party Congress.

== Members ==
| Rank | Name | PRO POL | 2nd POL | Birth | Death | Gender |
|---|---|---|---|---|---|---|
| 1 | Fidel Castro Ruz | Old | Reelected | 1926 | 2016 | Male |
| 2 | Raúl Castro Ruz | Old | Reelected | 1931 | — | Male |
| 3 | Juan Almeida Bosque | Old | Reelected | 1927 | 2009 | Male |
| 4 | Osvaldo Dorticós Torrado | Old | Reelected | 1919 | 1983 | Male |
| 5 | Guillermo García Frías | Old | Reelected | 1928 | — | Male |
| 6 | Armando Hart Dávalos | Old | Reelected | 1930 | 2017 | Male |
| 7 | Ramiro Valdés Menéndez | Old | Reelected | 1932 | 2026 | Male |
| 8 | Sergio del Valle Jiménez | Old | Reelected | 1927 | 2007 | Male |
| 9 | Blas Roca Calderío | New | Reelected | 1908 | 1987 | Male |
| 10 | José Ramón Machado Ventura | New | Reelected | 1930 | — | Male |
| 11 | Carlos Rafael Rodríguez Rodríguez | New | Reelected | 1913 | 1997 | Male |
| 12 | Pedro Miret Prieto | New | Reelected | 1927 | 2016 | Male |
| 13 | Arnaldo Milián Castro | New | Reelected | 1913 | 1983 | Male |
