= Hero of the Republic of Cuba =

Highest award of the Republic of Cuba

- The award of the Hero of the Republic of Cuba
- Type: Single-grade order
- Presented by: the Republic of Cuba
- Eligibility: Citizens of Cuba, foreigners
- Status: Active
- Established: 1979
- First award: 1980
- Related: Order of José Martí; Order of Cienfuegos

The honorary title Hero of the Republic of Cuba (Spanish: Héroe de la República de Cuba) is the highest decoration awarded by the Republic of Cuba. It is equivalent to other hero titles common in the Socialist Bloc. The decoration is physically represented with the Gold Star Medal (Spanish: Medalla Estrella de Oro), hanging in a gold plaque enamelled with the colors of the national flag.

It was established by the Decree-Law Number 30 of 10 December 1979, and it is "awarded to Cuban and foreign citizens in recognition of extraordinary merits achieved in productive labour or in struggles for conquests and in defense of the achievements and interests of the working class, as well as for consistent practice and valuable contributions to proletarian internationalism."

== Recipients ==
=== Individuals ===
It has been received by over forty individuals, also posthumously, including:

- Arnaldo Tamayo Méndez (1980)
- Yuri Romanenko (1980)
- Leonid Popov (1980)
- Valery Ryumin (1980)
- Leonid Brezhnev (1981)
- Abelardo Colomé Ibarra (1984)
- Arnaldo Ochoa Sánchez (1984)
- Ulises Rosales del Toro (1989)
- Leopoldo Cintra Frías (1989)
- Ramón Espinosa Martín (1989)
- Enrique Carreras Rolás (1989)
- Rafael Moracén Limonta (1989)
- Fidencio González Peraza (1989)
- Orlando Cardoso Villavicencio (1989)
- Rolando Pérez Quintosa (1992)
- Raúl Modesto Castro Ruz (1998)
- Juan Almeida Bosque (1998)
- Ramiro Valdés Menéndez (2001)
- Guillermo García Frías (2001)
- José Ramón Fernández Álvarez (2001)
- Sergio del Valle Jiménez (2001)
- Pedro Miret Prieto (2001)
- Julio Casas Regueiro (2001)
- Santiago Ceballos (1983)
- Joaquín Quintas Solá (2001)
- Efigenio Ameijeiras Delgado (2001)
- Antonio Enrique Lussón Batlle (2001)
- Samuel Rodiles Planas (2001)
- Raúl Menéndez Tomassevich (2001)
- Vilma Espín Guillois (2001)
- Melba Hernández Rodríguez del Rey (2001)
- Delsa Esther Puebla Viltre (2001)
- Gerardo Hernández Nordelo (2001)
- Ramón Labañino Salazar (2001)
- Fernando González Llort (2001)
- René González Sehwerert (2001)
- Antonio Guerrero Rodríguez (2001)
- José Ramón Machado Ventura (2013)
- Carlos Fernández Gondín (2015)
- Raúl Díaz-Argüelles García (2015)
- Víctor E. Schueg Colás (2015)
- Romárico V. Sotomayor García (2016)
- Álvaro López Miera
- Harry Villegas Tamayo

=== Localities ===
On 1 January 1984, the title was awarded to the city of Santiago de Cuba.

== See also ==
- Hero of the Soviet Union
- Orders, decorations, and medals of Cuba
