= ITM José Martí =

Coordinates: 23.0963°N 82.4176°W

Military Technical Institute
- Instituto Técnico Militar "Jose Marti"
- Other names: ITM Jose Marti
- Established: 1 February 1967
- Location: Marianao, Havana, Cuba
- Campus: Former convent

The ITM Jose Marti in Cuba, which may be translated as Military Technical Institute (Spanish: Instituto Técnico Militar), is a cadet school of the Cuban Revolutionary Armed Forces. It is located in Marianao, Havana and has served as a convent and was also a secondary school. The school was founded on 1 February 1967 by Cuban leader Fidel Castro. It is a recipient of the Antonio Maceo Order and holds the honorific of Cuban national hero José Martí. In 1998, the Cuban Academy of Sciences awarded it the status of Sponsor of Science and Technology.

== Program ==
It is intended for the training of higher and middle level officers, as well as technical non-commissioned officers. In addition, it trains highly qualified command teams and engineers for the different weapons and troops of the Anti-aircraft Defense and the Revolutionary Air Force. Students spend about five years in the institute just to graduate as a lieutenant.

There are three main divisions of cadets:

- Engineers
- Technicians
- Training of soldiers

== Cooperation ==
It has a cooperation agreement with the University of Information Science.
