= César Ignacio Arocha =

Cuban politician

César Ignacio Arocha Masid

Cuban Minister of Transportation
- In office 3 May 2010 – 9 September 2015
- Preceded by: Jorge Luis Sierra Cruz
- Succeeded by: Adel Yzquierdo Rodríguez

Personal details
- Born: 1959 (age 66–67)
- Party: Communist Party of Cuba
- Profession: military, railway engineer

César Ignacio Arocha Masid (born 1959) is a Cuban politician who served as Minister of Transportation from 3 May 2010 until 9 September 2015. He graduated military school and worked in the Soviet Union as a railway engineer. Later was also the commander of military transport units and military logistics and director general of bulk food in Cuba.
