= Cecilia García Arocha =

Venezuelan academic administrator

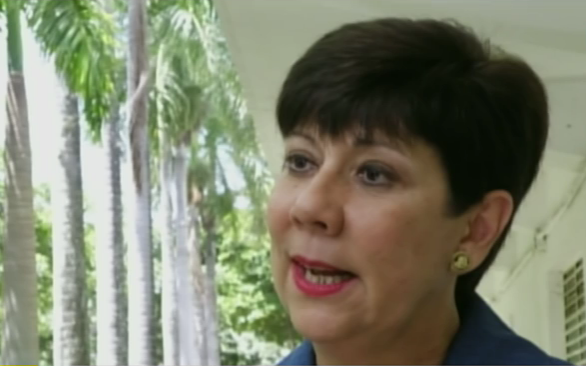

Former Rector of the Central University of Venezuela
- In office 16 May 2008 – 19 Jul 2023
- Preceded by: Antonio París

Personal details
- Born: Cecilia Carlota García Arocha Márquez; 16 September 1953 (age 73) Caracas, Venezuela
- Education: Central University of Venezuela
- Occupation: Professor, Dean, Secretary, Rector
- Known for: First female rector of UCV

Academic background
- Thesis: Evolution and current situation of human physiology teaching at the Dental School of the Universidad Central de Venezuela. (1981)

Cecilia Carlota García Arocha Márquez (Caracas, Venezuela, 16 September 1953) was the rector of the Central University of Venezuela (UCV). She is also a dentist who graduated from the same university in 1976. She uses both of her father's surnames.

== Early life ==
García was born in Caracas, to a family of UCV alumni. Her father, Raúl García Arocha, was a dentist and she soon picked up the skills from him. The García Arocha family have a long history of dentistry in Caracas. Her mother is Acela Márquez.

== Career ==
García graduated with honours in 1976 from the UCV school of dentistry, she became a professor at the university in the School of Medicine. She later held relevant positions within the Faculty of Dentistry as an academic coordinator, the school director, and then became the first female Dean of the faculty. After her first term in this role, she was re-elected and held the position for additional three consecutive terms; the terms of three years each meant she headed Dentistry for twelve years (1993-2004).

In her last year of Deanship, in 2004, García became part of the presidential ticket of Antonio París, and París won the election for that term (2004-2008). García was appointed university secretary, becoming the fourth woman to take this role. As secretary, she made considerable contributions to the restructuring of the Student Welfare Organization (OBE); she was a fighter for student rights and benefits, achieving improvements in the cafeteria services, transportation, and scholarships. In 2008, the team stood again, with García at the head, winning the second round of elections with 75% of the vote and so making history, with García as the first woman to be President of the Central University of Venezuela in its entire 286-year history.

It was around the time of her departure from the Faculty of Dentistry that García completed a PhD in Management, also at UCV. She has been given multiple awards and recognitions for her continued contributions to the university and for significant scientific and academic conferences; for example, she has been inducted to both the Order "José María Vargas" and the Order "Merit of Work".

During her time in office, there have been many attacks at the university. From 2008 to 2014 García reported nearly 100 crimes to the authorities, which were not looked at until the 2014 protests that saw many students rebel against the government. When García was called to testify, the blame was put on her. The government recommended an armed military presence around the campus, despite the latest acts of violence being from the National Guard, which García successfully resisted.. At the hearing administrative irregularities were also reported, and in October 2014 an investigation was opened by the government alleging inconsistencies in staff payments made by García.

During the 2019 presidential crisis, García lent her support and that of UCV to Juan Guaidó, and spoke out against the government preventing aid from entering Venezuela.
