= Álvaro Pérez Morales =

Cuban Minister of Transportation and Ports
- In office 7 March 1997 – 20 June 2003
- Preceded by: Maj. Gen. Senén Casas Regueiro
- Succeeded by: Carlos Manuel Pazo Torrado

Personal details
- Born: 26 November 1948 (age 77)
- Party: Communist Party of Cuba

Colonel Álvaro Pérez Morales (born 26 November 1948) is a retired Cuban official. He was the Cuban Minister of Transportation from 7 March 1997 till 20 June 2003. He replaced minister Senén Casas Regueiro.
