= Jorge Luis Sierra Cruz =

Cuban politician

Cuban Minister of Transportation
- In office 20 October 2006 – 3 May 2010
- Preceded by: Carlos Manuel Pazo Torrado
- Succeeded by: César Ignacio Arocha

Personal details
- Born: September 4, 1961 Banes, Holguin
- Died: October 28, 2014 Age 54 C.Habana
- Party: Communist Party of Cuba
- Profession: Mechanical engineer

Jorge Luis Sierra Cruz (born 4 September 1961 – died 27 October 2014) was a Cuban politician. He was the Cuban Minister of Transportation (since 20 October 2006), the Member of the Political Bureau of the Communist Party of Cuba and the Member of the Executive Committee of CPC. He was a Cuban Vice President since 19 February 2009 till 3 May 2010. He is also a deputy in National Assembly of People's Power. He died after complications from knee surgery, followed by a massive heart attack.
