= Carlos Manuel Pazo Torrado =

Cuban politician

Cuban Minister of Transportation
- In office 20 June 2003 – 20 October 2006
- Preceded by: Álvaro Pérez Morales
- Succeeded by: Jorge Luis Sierra Cruz

Personal details
- Born: June 6, 1963 (age 63)
- Party: Communist Party of Cuba
- Profession: photographic aerial geodesy surveyor

Carlos Manuel Pazo Torrado (born 6 June 1963) is a Cuban politician. He was the Cuban Minister of Transportation from 20 June 2003 till 20 October 2006. He started his career in 1984 in a cadastral office. In 1993 he was promoted to the Member of the Provincial Bureau of the CPC in Las Tunas. He is an expert in geodesics and cartography. Before the nomination he was the head of the Department of Construction, Transport and Communications of the Central Committee of CPC.
