= José Martí International Airport =

Cuban airport serving Havana located in Boyeros

José Martí International Airport Rancho Boyeros Airport
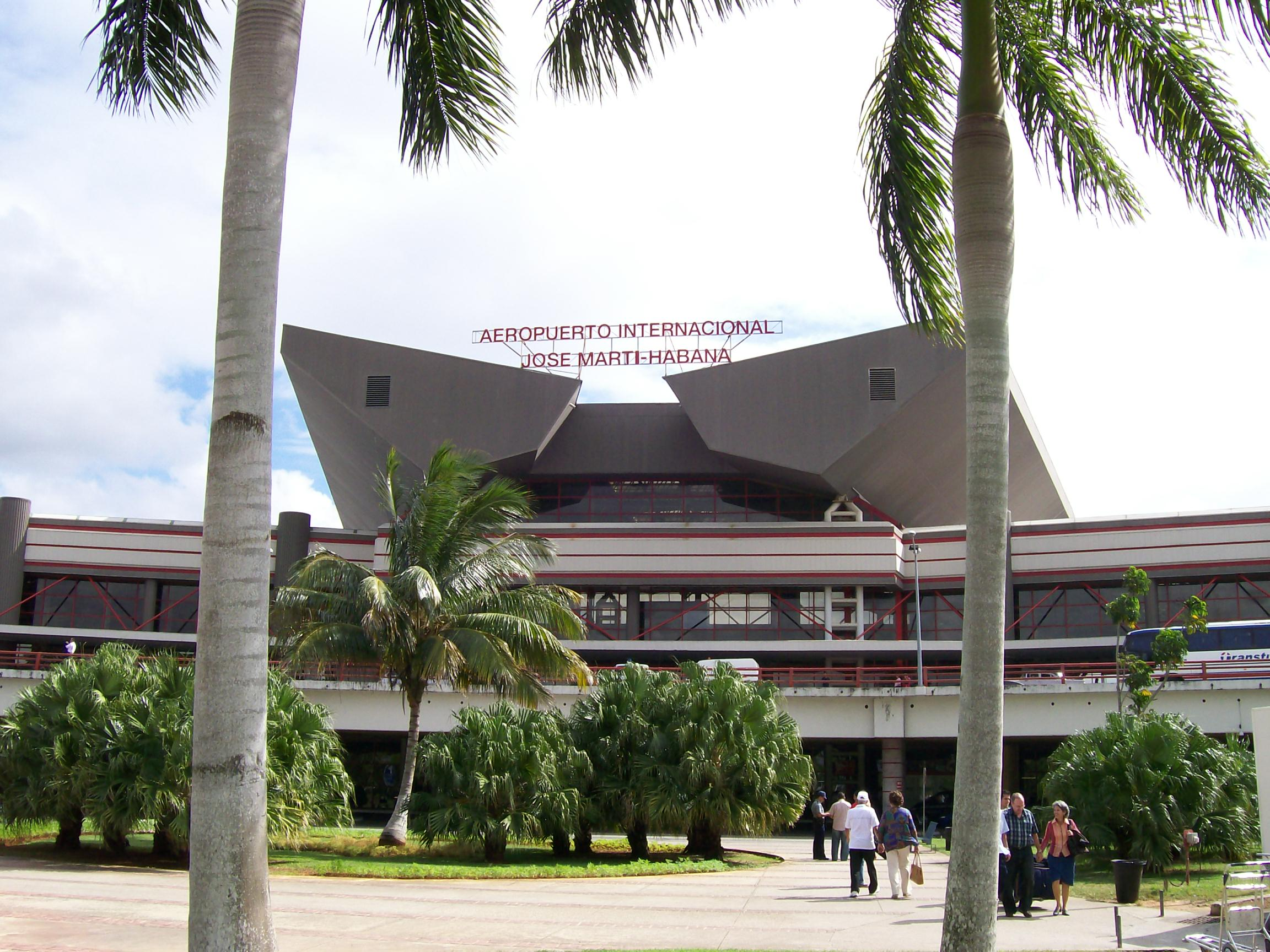
- IATA: HAV; ICAO: MUHA

Summary
- Airport type: Public
- Operator: ECASA
- Serves: Havana
- Location: Boyeros
- Hub for: Cubana de Aviación; Aerogaviota
- Built: 24 February 1930
- Elevation AMSL: 64 m (210 ft)
- Coordinates: 22°59′21″N 082°24′33″W

Map
- Location in Cuba

Runways
| Direction | Length | | Surface |
| Direction | m | ft | Surface |
|---|---|---|---|
| 06/24 | 4,000 | 13,123 | Asphalt |

Statistics (2022)
- Passengers: 9,649,624
- Source: Aerodrome chart

José Martí International Airport (IATA: HAV, ICAO: MUHA; Spanish: Aeropuerto Internacional José Martí), sometimes known by its former name Rancho Boyeros Airport (Aeropuerto de Rancho Boyeros), is an international airport located in the municipality of Boyeros, 20 kilometres (12 mi) southwest of the centre of Havana, Cuba, and is a hub for Cubana de Aviación and Aerogaviota, and former Latin American hub for the Soviet (later Russian) airline Aeroflot. It is Cuba's main international airport, and serves several million passengers each year. The facility is operated by Empresa Cubana de Aeropuertos y Servicios Aeronáuticos (ECASA).

The airport lies in the municipality of Boyeros and connects Havana with the rest of the Caribbean, North, Central and South America, as well as Europe. It is named in memory of patriot and poet José Martí.

Private Cuban citizens are not allowed to own aircraft; all aircraft in Cuba belong to state-owned airlines or the military. Only government and foreign-owned aircraft are allowed to use the facilities. As of 2020, Copa Airlines was the foreign airline with most flights to the airport, operating 34 flights a week (roughly five daily flights) from Panama City, Panama, and Bogotá, Colombia.

== History ==
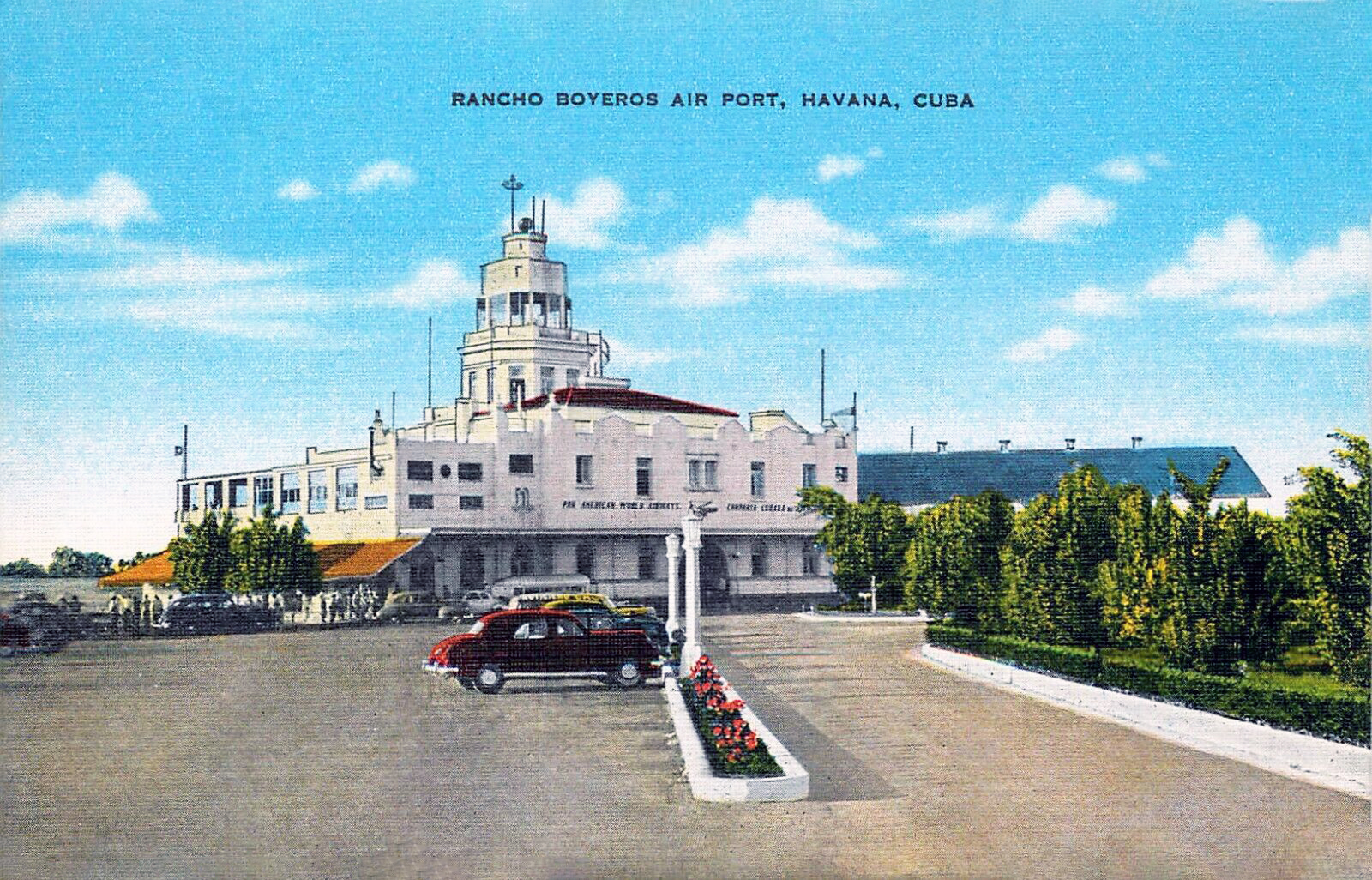
The airport depicted on a historic postcard, c. 1940

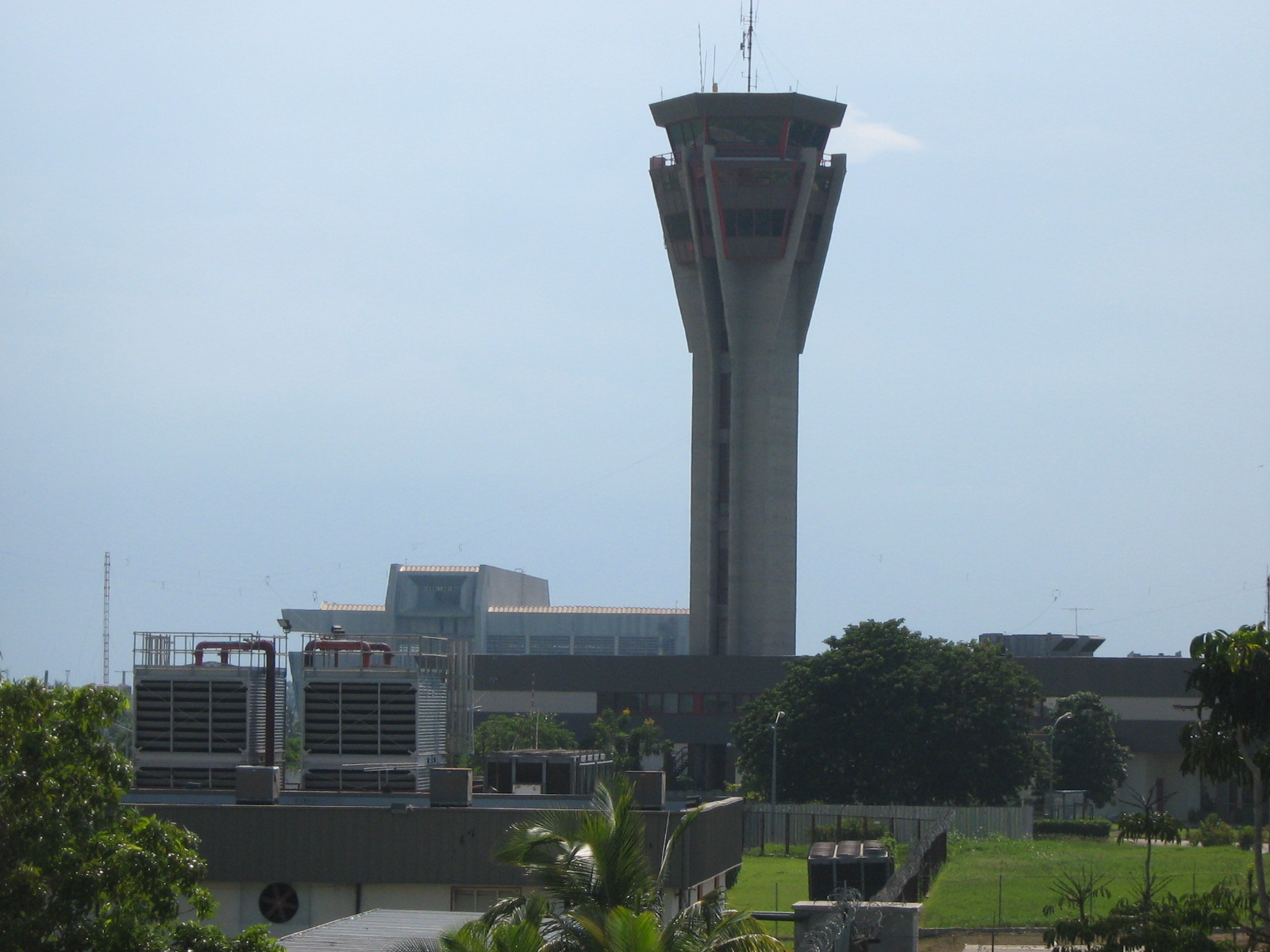
Air traffic control tower

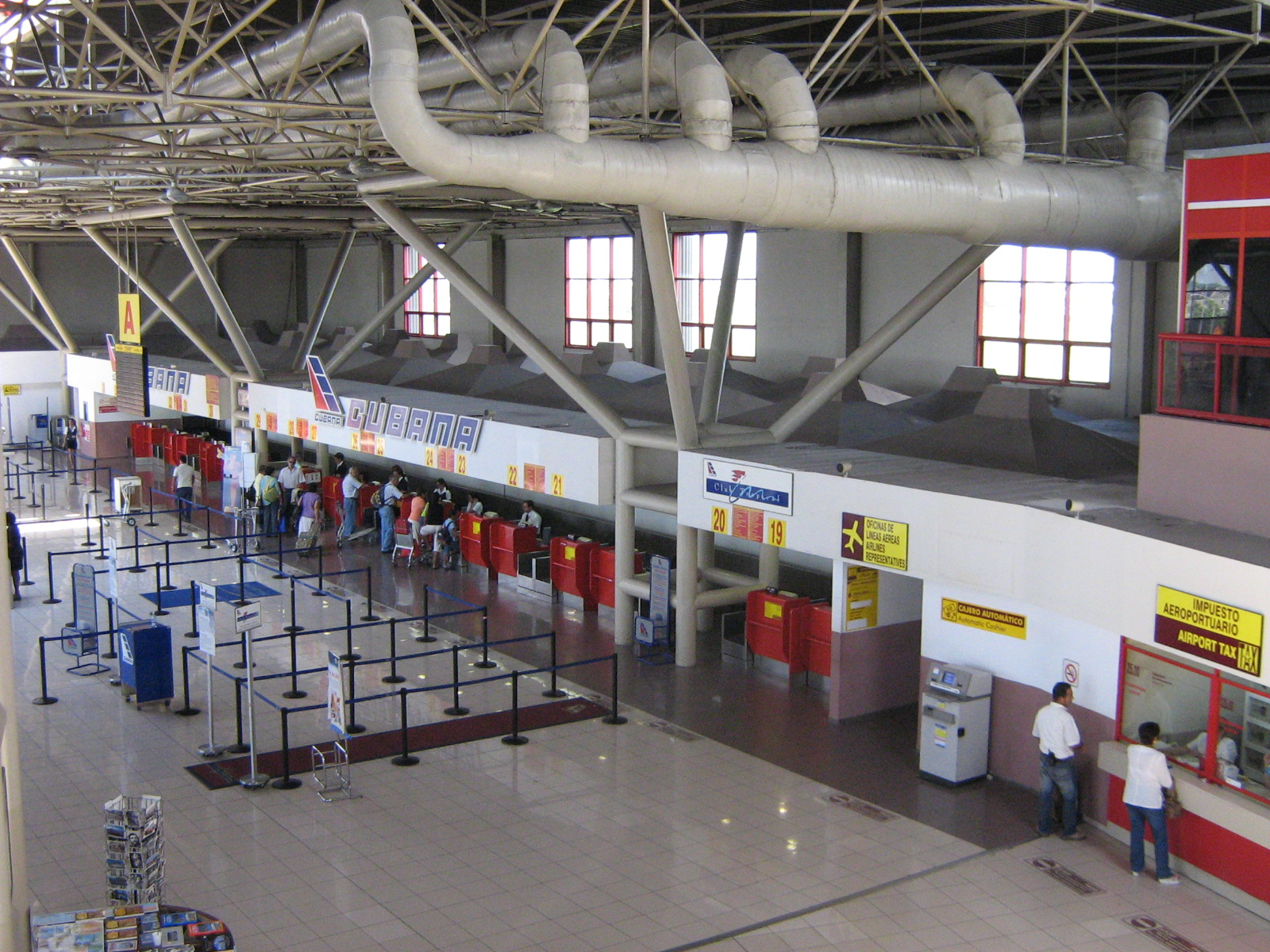
Terminal 3 interior

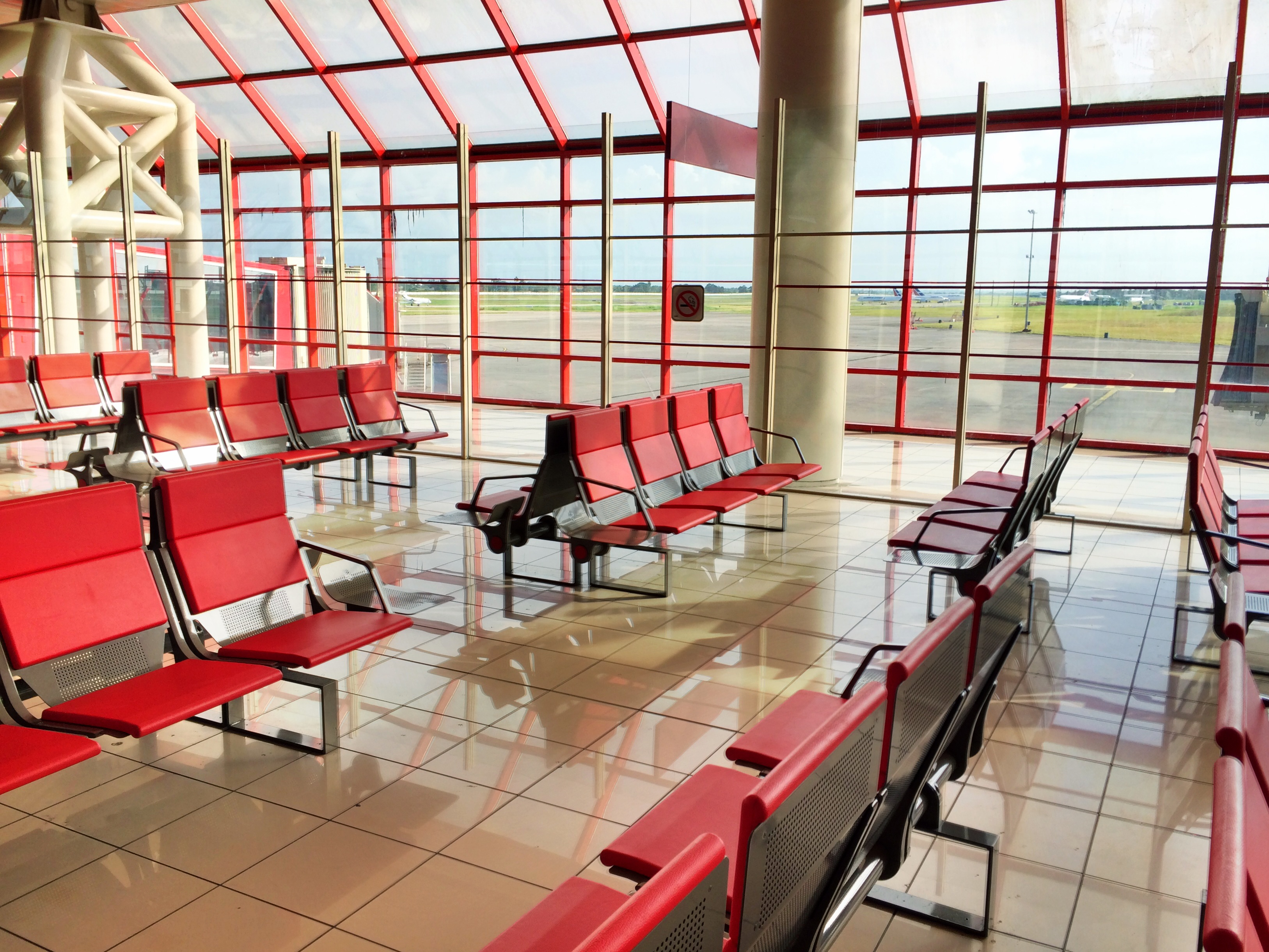
Terminal 3 interior

=== Foundation and early years ===
The current José Martí Airport in 1930 replaced the Columbia Airfield, which was the first airport to serve Havana. The original name of the airport, Rancho Boyeros, meaning the "(Bull) Drover Ranch", was in reference to the name of the plains where the airport was being built. It was known as the Rancho Boyeros because in colonial times a local family had built a thatched hut and provided meals and an inn to the weary drovers that brought agricultural products to the capital from Batabanó and Vuelta Abajo. To give a progressive environment to the airport, the old ranch homes were transformed into a small town that would serve as an industrial, livestock, agriculture and commercial centre, rising comfortable homes, an industrial technical school, a paint factory and other facilities. The town today is known as the Boyeros Municipality.

The construction of José Martí Airport, formerly Rancho Boyeros Airport, was authorized in March 1929 by General Order No. 223. On 24 February 1930, the airport opened, replacing the former Ciudad Libertad Airport. On 30 October of the same year, the first flight by Cubana de Aviación (formerly Compañía Nacional Cubana de Aviación Curtiss) from Havana to Santiago de Cuba carried the mail on a Ford Trimotor with stops in Santa Clara, Morón and Camagüey. Flights to Madrid started in 1936 with a Lockheed Sirius named 4 September, commanded by Capt. Antonio Menéndez Pélaez. She was flown via Venezuela, Natal, Brazil, and Dakar, Senegal.

By January 1943 the airport had its first control tower, the first in the country. vIn 1945, the International Air Transport Association (IATA) was formed in Havana. Cubana's first international flight out of the airport was a Douglas DC-3 to Miami on 15 May of the same year. The first transatlantic flight from any Latin American country to Europe took place in 1946 from Havana to Madrid on a Douglas DC-4, operated by Aerovias Cubanas Internacionales (Cunnair), founded by Cuban pioneer Reinaldo Ramirez Rosell. On 2 April 1950 the airport received a second route to Europe with flights to Rome on a Cubana de Aviación DC-4. The first night flight landed at the airport from Santiago de Cuba with a Douglas DC-3 in 1951. The first route to Mexico City was inaugurated in 1953 by Cubana, utilizing a Lockheed Constellation.

=== Embargoes since the 1960s ===
In 1961, diplomatic relations with the United States deteriorated substantially and with the United States embargo against Cuba, airlines from the United States were not permitted to operate regular scheduled flights to the airport. That year, two days prior to the failed Bay of Pigs Invasion organized by the CIA with the participation of Cuban exiles, Douglas A-26 Invader aircraft from Brigade 2506 bombarded José Martí Airport and Antonio Maceo Airport in Santiago de Cuba.

Because of Cuba's relationship with the Soviet Union, the airport during the 1970s and 1980s enjoyed the presence of many Eastern Bloc airline companies, such as Aeroflot, Czechoslovak Airlines, Interflug, and LOT Polish Airlines. In 1977 an Aeroflot Ilyushin Il-62 operating a scheduled flight from Moscow to Havana via Frankfurt and Lisbon crashed after takeoff from Lisbon, killing 68 of the 70 on board and one person on the ground.

In 1988, Terminal 2 was constructed in anticipation of future charter flights to the United States. In the 1990s the special charter flights were approved by the US government, to operate from Miami for Cuban citizens living in the United States that have close relatives in Cuba. Today, various airlines operate non-stop scheduled charter service between Havana and Miami. On 31 December 1997 a Concorde landed in Cuba for the first time, landing at José Martí Airport. The London-Paris-Barbados-Havana Air France flight was received at the airport by Fidel Castro, who boarded the aircraft and greeted the crew and passengers. On 26 April the following year, the new International Terminal 3 was inaugurated by Canada's Prime Minister Jean Chrétien and Cuba's President Fidel Castro.

=== Development in the 2000s ===
In 2002 Air Freight Logistics Enterprise (ELCA S.A.) opened José Martí's first freight terminal known as the Aerovaradero Freight Terminal. The terminal has a 600 t (590 long tons; 660 short tons) capacity, 2,000 m^{3} (71,000 cu ft) of space in two refrigeration and freezing chambers, with humidity and gas controls.

In 2007, three young recruits who deserted from the Cuban Army tried to hijack a commercial passenger aircraft aiming to defect to the United States. At Terminal 1, the would-be hijackers killed one of the hostages, a lieutenant colonel. Terminal 2 was remodeled and expanded in 2010.

Special charter service to the United States were allowed from the 1990s, but were required to be operated by travel companies licensed by the U.S. government, largely from Florida. In March 2015, Sun Country Airlines started operating regularly scheduled charter flights from New York during the Cuban Thaw. Delta resumed its flights to New Orleans in March 2015, after not flying the route for over 50 years. Regularly scheduled commercial service to and from the United States began again in the fall of 2016, with such airlines as American, Delta, JetBlue and, after January 2017, Alaska, flying to Havana. However, several airlines had dropped, if not cut back, flights to Cuba by late 2017 due in part to President Trump's decision to reimpose stricter travel regulations, therefore partially ending the Cuban Thaw. Several other reasons that the airlines ended the flights were because of weaker-than-expected demand and a paucity of tourist infrastructure.

In February 2016, a VIP room at the airport was used as the location for the historic meeting of Pope Francis and Patriarch Kirill.

In March 2020, Cuba announced that it was closing its borders because of the COVID-19 pandemic. Only humanitarian flights were then permitted. On 10 November 2020, it was announced that the airport would re-open to commercial flights on 15 November. Some airlines started operations again, but not all those which had flown previously. In January 2021, the Cuban authorities placed restrictions on the number of flights from a number of countries, and halted flights from a few. Separately, Canadian airlines stopped flying to Caribbean destinations, including Cuba.

== Terminals ==
There are currently three passenger terminals in general use at the airport.

=== Terminal 1 ===
Domestic Terminal 1 was the main international and domestic terminal building in the airport prior to the opening of Terminals 2 and 3. It is located on the east side of Runway 6, and is now used primarily for domestic flights.

=== Terminal 2 ===
Terminal 2 handles some long-distance international flights, such as to Zürich, Frankfurt, and Helsinki, along with a few Caribbean flights, such as to Aruba, Trinidad and Tobago, and most scheduled charter flights to and from Miami, Tampa, Ft. Lauderdale, and New York City. The scheduled charter flights to the United States are operated by Gulfstream Air Charters, ABC Charters, Marazul Charters, CTS Charters, and C & T Charters. The terminal is located on the north side roughly 2 kilometres (1.2 mi) from Terminal 3, and is just in front of the threshold of runway 24. It was constructed in 1988 when the first charter flights after the revolution were opened from Miami. There are bars, bookshops, newsagents, a restaurant, and car rentals.

=== Terminal 3 ===
International Terminal 3 is the main international terminal and was designed by Mario Girona, it opened in 1998. It is the largest and most modern of all terminals. Ticketing and departures are located on the upper level; arrivals and baggage carousels are located on the lower level. There are several car rentals located in the arrivals area.

== Airlines and destinations ==
The following airlines operate regular scheduled and charter flights at Havana Airport:

| Airlines | Destinations |
|---|---|
| Aerogaviota | Baracoa, Cayo Coco, Nueva Gerona, Santiago de Cuba |
| Aeroméxico | Mexico City–Benito Juárez |
| Air Century | Santo Domingo–La Isabela |
| Air China | Beijing–Capital, Madrid |
| Air Europa | Madrid |
| American Airlines | Miami |
| Caribbean Airlines | Port of Spain |
| Conviasa | Caracas |
| Copa Airlines | Panama City–Tocumen |
| Cubana de Aviación | Holguín, Nueva Gerona, Santiago de Cuba |
| Delta Air Lines | Miami |
| Rutaca Airlines | Valencia (VE) |
| Sky High | Georgetown–Cheddi Jagan, Santo Domingo–Las Américas |
| Southwest Airlines | Tampa |
| TAAG Angola Airlines | Luanda–Agostinho Neto |
| Turkish Airlines | Istanbul |
| Viva | Cancún, Mérida, Mexico City–Felipe Ángeles, Monterrey |
| Wingo | Bogotá, Panama City–Balboa |

== Accidents and incidents ==
- On 9 August 1961, shortly after takeoff, five hijackers stormed the cockpit of a Cubana de Aviación Curtiss C-46 Commando in which the captain was killed as well as a hijacker and a guard. The co-pilot attempted to go back to Havana Airport and made an emergency landing in a sugar cane field, four hijackers fled the scene. Three died during the hijacking, all others survived the emergency landing.
- On 14 May 1973, Cubana de Aviación Flight CU 707, an Antonov An-24, crashed in bad weather on landing at Havana Airport because of pilot error and miscommunication by the co-pilot. Three occupants died, four were seriously injured and another ten had minor injuries.
- The 1977 Aeroflot Ilyushin 62 crash on 27 May killed 68 of the 70 on-board and one person on the ground. At the time, the accident was the deadliest aviation accident in Cuba's history; it remains the third deadliest. One of the victims was José Carlos Schwarz, a poet and musician from Guinea-Bissau.
- On 3 September 1989, Cubana de Aviación Flight 9046, an Ilyushin Il-62M (CU-T1281) operating a non-scheduled international passenger flight to Cologne (Cologne Bonn Airport), West Germany, crashed shortly after take-off. 114 passengers and all 11 crew members, as well as 24 persons on the ground were killed. Only one of the passengers survived the crash initially, succumbing to his injuries nine days later.
- On 3 May 2007, two army recruits hijacked a plane destined for Miami at José Martí International Airport in Havana. The men killed a hostage before being arrested prior to takeoff. It was the first Cuban hijacking attempt reported since the spring of 2003.
- On 18 May 2018, a Global Air (Mexico) Boeing 737-200 operating as Cubana de Aviación Flight 972 crashed after takeoff, killing 112 of the 113 people on board (107 passengers and 6 crew).

== See also ==
- List of airports in the Caribbean
- List of the busiest airports in the Caribbean
