= Aerogaviota =

Cuban airline

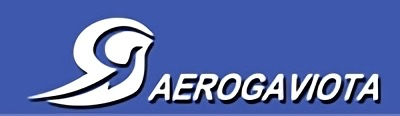
| IATA | ICAO | Call sign |
|---|---|---|
| — | GTV | GAVIOTA |
- Founded: 1994; 32 years ago
- Hubs: Playa Baracoa Airport
- Fleet size: 4
- Destinations: 7
- Parent company: GAVIOTA, S.A. (GAESA)
- Headquarters: Havana, Cuba
- Founders: Cuban Revolutionary Armed Forces

Aerogaviota is a Cuban regional airline based in Havana. It operates domestic flights within Cuba and formerly also served Jamaica. Its main base is Playa Baracoa Airport.

== History ==
The airline was established by the Cuban army and started operations in 1994, and is wholly owned by the Government of Cuba, run by Corporación de la Aviación Civil S.A of Cuba.

Aerogaviota was forced to suspend operations in 2022 due to a lack of available aviation fuel but in late 2023 resumed a network of domestic destinations with future plans to resume international flights to Jamaica in support of the receding Cuban tourism.

== Destinations ==
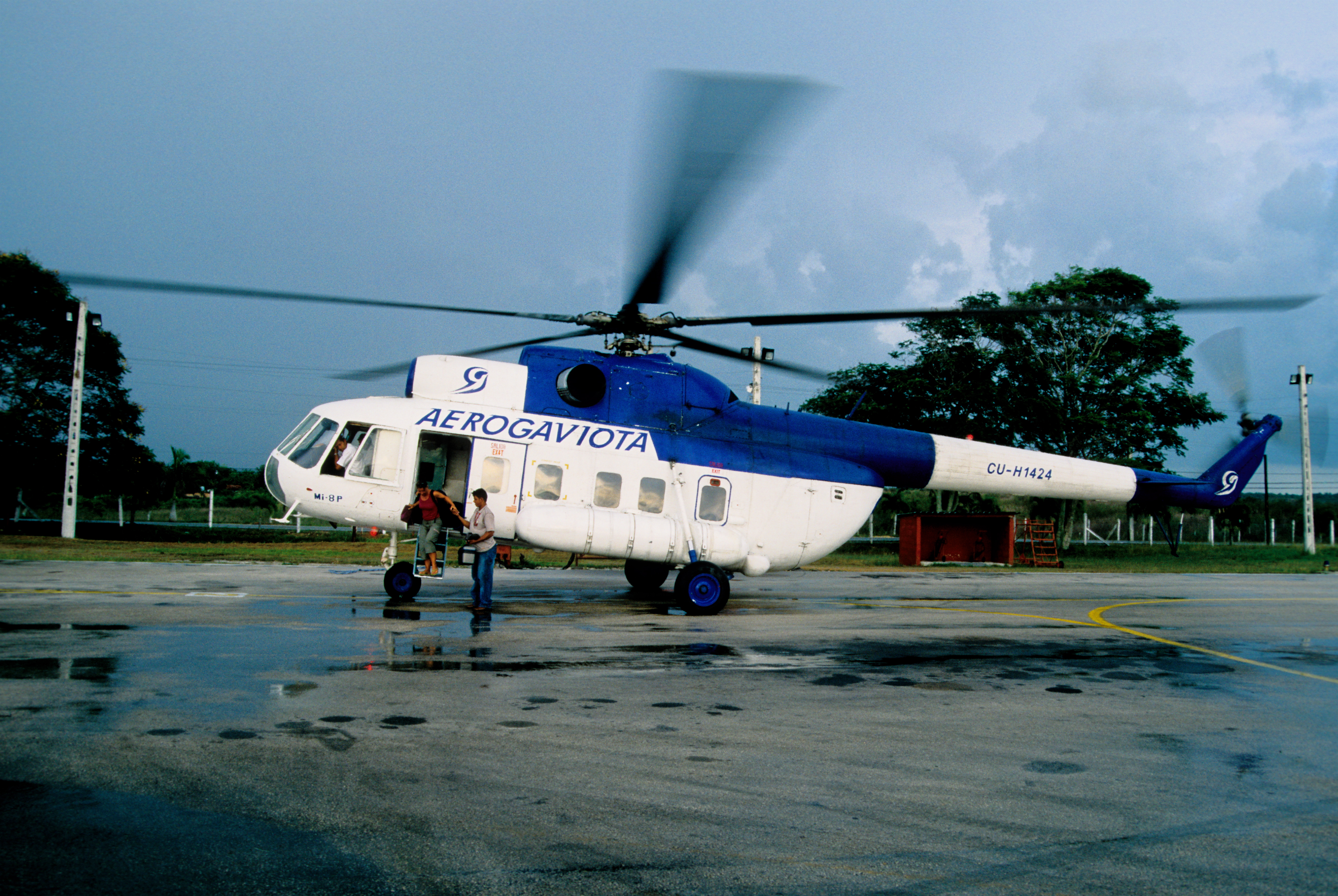
A former Aerogaviota Mi-8 helicopter in 2004.

As of August 2023, Aerogaviota serves scheduled domestic destinations:

- Baracoa
- Cayo Coco
- Cayo Las Brujas
- Havana
- Manzanillo
- Nueva Gerona
- Santiago de Cuba

== Fleet ==
=== Current fleet ===
As of July 2026, Aerogaviota operates the following aircraft:

| Aircraft | In service | Orders | Notes |
|---|---|---|---|
| ATR 42-500 | 4 | — | |
| Total | 4 | — | |

=== Former fleet ===
As of August 2025, Aerogaviota operated the following aircraft:

- 4 ATR 42-500 (1 operated for Cubana de Aviación, 1 stored)

== Accidents and incidents ==
- On 29 April 2017, an Antonov An-26 chartered by Cuban military crashed at Las Lomas de San Cristóbal, killing all 8 people on board.
