= Álvaro Pérez López =

Spanish politician (born 1973)

Member of the Congress of Deputies
- Incumbent
- Assumed office 17 August 2023
- Constituency: A Coruña

Personal details
- Born: 13 February 1973 (age 53)
- Party: People's Party

Álvaro Pérez López (born 13 February 1973) is a Spanish politician serving as a member of the Congress of Deputies since 2023. He has served as parliamentary coordinator of the People's Party since 2022.
