= Juan Carlos Robinson Agramonte =

Cuban politician (born 1956)

Juan Carlos Robinson Agramonte (born July 16, 1956), was a member of the Cuban politburo and First Secretary of the Provincial Committee of the Cuban Communist Party in Santiago de Cuba. In April 2006 he was dismissed from the Politburo, and in June he was sentenced to 12 years in prison for corruption. . He was released from prison in 2010.
