= Ministry of the Interior (Cuba) =

Government ministry of Cuba

Ministry of the Interior of the Republic of Cuba
- Ministerio del Interior de la República de Cuba
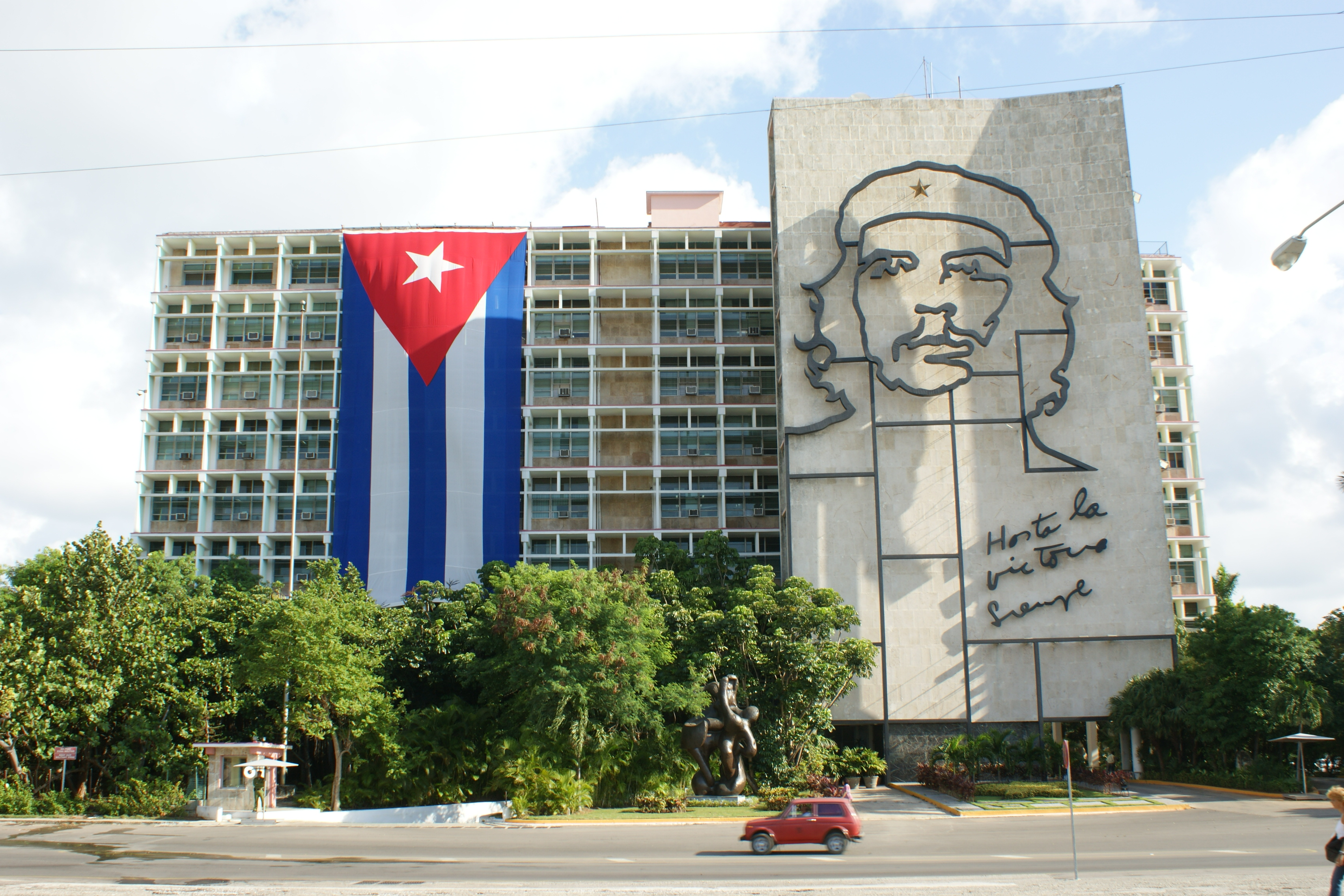
- The MININT building in Havana.

Agency overview
- Formed: June 6, 1961; 65 years ago
- Headquarters: Plaza de la Revolución, Havana
- Minister responsible: Lázaro Alberto Álvarez Casas (PCC)
- Website: archive

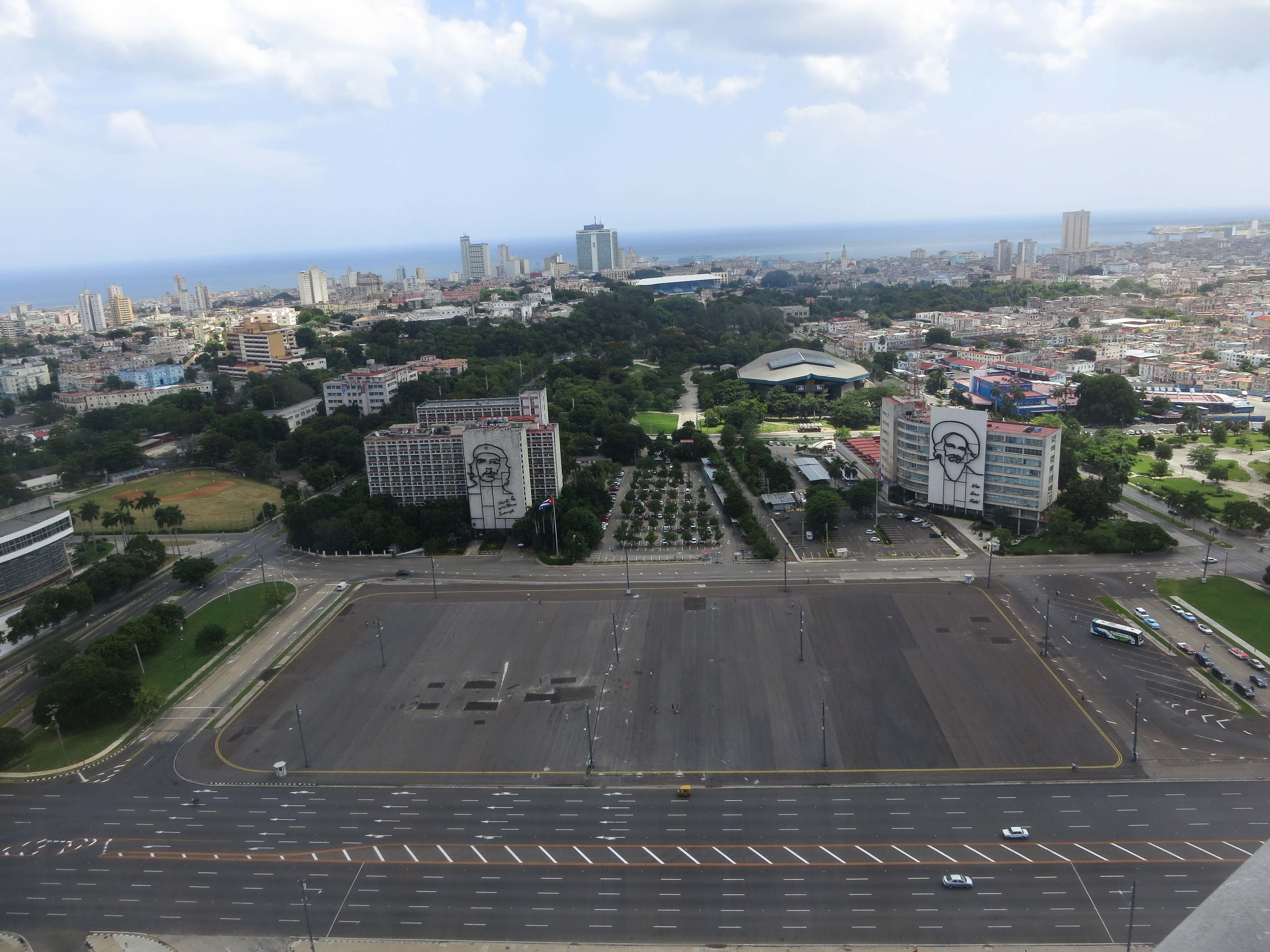
A panoramic view of Plaza de la Revolución and central Havana. MININT's building is in the left, next to Che Guevara sculpture by Enrique Ávila.

The Ministry of the Interior of the Republic of Cuba (Spanish: Ministerio del Interior de la República de Cuba), also known as MININT, is the Cuban government ministry which oversees the home affairs of Cuba. Its headquarters is in a building of Plaza de la Revolución, a central and famous square of Havana.

== History ==
It was founded on June 6, 1961, replacing and expanding the old Ministry of the Interior (Ministerio de Gobernación), inherited by the Cuban Revolution from the previous governments.

== Functions ==
The organs and structures that are part of the Minister fulfill functions of citizen security, and the establishment of the internal order. The MININT also includes various logistics agencies, force preparation, etc. It has commercial companies that provide security services as SEPSA (Specialized Protection Services, S.A.), SEISA or ACERPROT), which include chain stores selling to the population.

The Ministry oversees the functions of security and public order through the National Revolutionary Police Force (PNR) and the auxiliary body of the Committees for the Defense of the Revolution (CDR).

The MININT has its own teaching system, with several national schools (higher institutes) and schools in the provinces. In Havana, it has a polytechnic institute, named Instituto Superior del MININT Eliseo Reyes Rodríguez, for the training of media technicians in specialties related to criminal and police investigation lines.

== Structure ==
The following structure is in place with MININT as of 2021:

- National Revolutionary Police Force
- Dirección de Inteligencia
- Special National Brigade (or Black Berets)
- State Security Department
- Technical Directorate of Investigations
- Directorate of Border Guard Troops
- Cuban Fire Corps
- Directorate of Personal Security
- Directorate of Criminal Investigation and Operations
- Directorate of Penitentiary Establishments
- Directorate of Attention to Minors
- Directorate of Identification, Immigration and Aliens

== Special National Brigade ==
The Special National Brigade (Spanish: BRIGADA ESPECIAL NACIONAL DEL MINISTERIO DEL INTERIOR, BEN), also referred to as the Black Berets (Spanish: Boinas Negras) or SNB, is a special forces brigade run by the MININT. It performs missions that deal with riot control, hostage rescue, and counterterrorism. The SNB was deployed in response to pro-democracy protests that began on July 11, 2021. The United States government sanctioned them because of human rights concerns related to mass arrests and physical violence used against the protesters, which the Cuban government opposes. The Black Berets celebrated the fortieth anniversary of its founding on August 9, 2020.

As of April 4, 2022, the Special National Brigade is led by Brigadier General Noaldo Arcas Rodríguez. The Black Berets have trained with China's People's Armed Police (PAP), who trained them in hand-to-hand combat, hostage rescue, tactical shooting, and handling large riots.

== Ministers ==
† denotes people who died in office.

| No. | Portrait | Minister | Took office | Left office | Time in office | Party | Ref. |
|---|---|---|---|---|---|---|---|
| 1 | Ramiro Valdés Menéndez | Ramiro Valdés Menéndez (1932–2026) | 1961 | 1968 | 6–7 years | PCC | — |
| 2 | Sergio del Valle Jiménez | Sergio del Valle Jiménez (1927–2007) | 1968 | 1979 | 10–11 years | PCC | — |
| (1) | Ramiro Valdés Menéndez | Ramiro Valdés Menéndez (1932–2026) | 1979 | 1985 | 5–6 years | PCC | — |
| 3 | José Abrantes Fernández [es] | José Abrantes Fernández (1931–1991) | 1985 | 1989 | 3–4 years | PCC | — |
| 4 | Abelardo Colomé Ibarra | Corps General; Abelardo Colomé Ibarra (born 1939) | 1989 | 2015 | 25–26 years | PCC | — |
| 5 | Carlos Fernández Gondín | Divisional General; Carlos Fernández Gondín (1938–2017) | 26 October 2015 | 7 January 2017 † | 1 year, 73 days | PCC | |
| 6 | Julio César Gandarilla Bermejo | Divisional General; Julio César Gandarilla Bermejo (1943–2020) | 10 January 2017 | 24 November 2020 † | 3 years, 319 days | PCC | |
| 7 | Lázaro Alberto Álvarez Casas [es] | Divisional General; Lázaro Alberto Álvarez Casas (born 1963) | 24 November 2020 | Incumbent | 5 years, 340 days | PCC | |
