= Chief of the General Staff (Cuba) =

Highest-ranking military officer in Cuba

- Jefe del Estado Mayor General de las Fuerzas Armadas de Cuba (Spanish)
- Flag of the Chief of the General Staff
- Incumbent; Major general Roberto Legrá Sotolongo since 19 April 2021
- Type: Chief of staff
- Reports to: President of Cuba; Minister of Defense
- Seat: MINFAR
- Appointer: First Secretary of the Communist Party of Cuba President of Cuba
- Formation: 19 April 1972
- First holder: Major general Senén Casas Regueiro
- Deputy: First Deputy Chief of the General Staff

The Chief of the General Staff of the Revolutionary Armed Forces is the head of the General Staff and the highest-ranking officer of the Cuban Revolutionary Armed Forces or is also the senior-most uniformed military officer. He is appointed by the President of Cuba, who is the Commander-in-Chief. He also serves as First Deputy Minister of the MINFAR. The current Chief of the General Staff is Major Gen. Roberto Legrá Sotolongo.

== List ==
No.	Portrait	Name (Birth–Death)	Term of office			Ref.
No.	Portrait	Name (Birth–Death)	Took office	Left office	Time in office	Ref.
1		Major general Senén Casas Regueiro (1934–1996)	19 April 1972	April 1982	9 years, 11 months	
2		Major general Ulises Rosales del Toro (born 1942)	April 1982	11 October 1997	15 years, 6 months	
3		Corps general Álvaro López Miera (born 1943)	11 October 1997	15 April 2021	23 years, 6 months	
–		Major general Roberto Legrá Sotolongo (born 1955)	15 April 2021	19 April 2021	4 days	
4		Major general Roberto Legrá Sotolongo (born 1955)	19 April 2021	Incumbent	5 years, 193 days	

== See also ==
- Chief of Defence Staff (Jamaica)
