= Senén Casas Regueiro =

Cuban politician

Minister of Transportation
- In office circa 12 June 1989 – 6 August 1996
- Preceded by: Diocles Torralba Gonzalez
- Succeeded by: Álvaro Pérez Morales

Personal details
- Born: 30 July 1934 Bombí, El Salvador, Cuba
- Died: 6 August 1996 (aged 62)
- Party: Communist Party of Cuba

Major General Senén Casas Regueiro (30 July 1934 in Bombí - 6 August 1996) was a Cuban politician. He was the Cuban Minister of Transportation from 1989 till his death. He was also the first deputy minister of defence and the chief of staff of the Cuban army. He was a brother of another Cuban politician, Julio Casas Regueiro.

== Legacy ==
The railway station of Santiago de Cuba, rebuilt in 1997, was named after him.

== Sources ==
- solvision.co.cu (Senén Casas Regueiro: Un General guantanamero, Agustín Pérez)
