= Adel Yzquierdo =

Cuban politician and engineer (born 1945)

Minister of Transport
- Incumbent
- Assumed office 9 September 2015
- Preceded by: César Ignacio Arocha

Personal details
- Born: 12 June 1945 (age 81)
- Party: Communist Party of Cuba
- Profession: military, engineer

Adel Onofre Yzquierdo Rodríguez (born 12 June 1945) is a Cuban politician and engineer.

== Early life ==
Yzquierdo Rodríguez studied at the V.V. Kuybyshev Institute of Civil Engineering in Moscow.

He has held several positions in the Council of Ministers: Minister of Economy and Planning from 2011 to 2014; First Vice-Minister of Economy and Planning from 26 September 2014 to 9 September 2015; and Minister of Transport from 9 September 2015 to date.

Yzquierdo was appointed vice-president of the Council of Ministers on 20 February 2012.

On 18 April 2019, he was elected to the National Assembly of People's Power, representing the municipality of Playa in Havana.
