= Cuban Revolutionary Armed Forces =

Military forces of Cuba

Revolutionary Armed Forces
- Fuerzas Armadas Revolucionarias (Spanish)
- The emblem of the Cuban Revolutionary Armed Forces
- Founded: 1868; 158 years ago
- Current form: 1960; 66 years ago
- Service branches: Cuban Revolutionary Army; Cuba Air Force; Cuban Revolutionary Navy
- Headquarters: Havana, Cuba

Leadership
- Commander in Chief: First Secretary Miguel Díaz-Canel
- Minister of the Revolutionary Armed Forces: Corps Gen. Álvaro López Miera
- Chief of the General Staff: Lieutenant Gen. Roberto Legrá Sotolongo

Personnel
- Military age: 17-28 years of age for compulsory military service
- Conscription: 2-year service obligation for both genders
- Active personnel: 50,000 (2022 est.)
- Reserve personnel: 40,000

Expenditure
- Percent of GDP: 4.2% (2020 est.)

Industry
- Domestic suppliers: Union de Industrias Militares
- Foreign suppliers: China; Russia

Related articles
- History: Escambray rebellion; Bay of Pigs Invasion; Sand War; Guinea-Bissau War of Independence; First Yemenite War; Fourth Arab-Israeli War; Cuban intervention in Angola; Ogaden War; United States invasion of Grenada; 2026 United States intervention in Venezuela
- Ranks: Military ranks of Cuba

The Cuban Revolutionary Armed Forces (Spanish: Fuerzas Armadas Revolucionarias; FAR) are the military forces of Cuba. They include the Revolutionary Army, Revolutionary Navy, and the Revolutionary Air and Air Defense Force.

Paramilitary bodies include the Territorial Troops Militia (Milicias de Tropas Territoriales – MTT), Youth Labor Army (Ejército Juvenil del Trabajo – EJT), and the Defense and Production Brigades (Brigadas de Producción y Defensa – BPD), plus the Civil Defense Organization (Defensa Civil de Cuba – DCC) and the National Reserves Institution (Instituto Nacional de las Reservas Estatales – INRE). All these groups are subordinated to the Ministry of the Revolutionary Armed Forces (Ministro de las Fuerzas Armadas Revolucionarias – MINFAR) and controlled by the Communist Party of Cuba.

The armed forces have long been the most powerful institution in Cuba. The military manages many enterprises in key economic sectors representing about 4% of the Cuban economy. The military has also served as former Cuban Communist Party First Secretary, and former President of the Council of State, Raúl Castro's base. In numerous speeches, Raúl Castro emphasized the military's role as a "people's partner".

== History ==
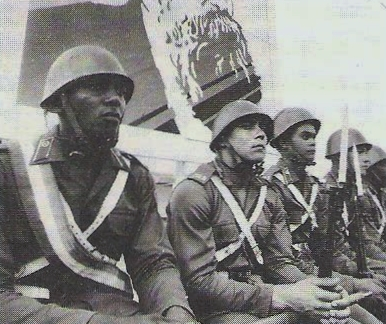
Soldiers of the FAR

The Cuban Army in its original form was first established in 1868 by Cuban revolutionaries during the Ten Years' War. It joined the Allies in the World War I in April 1917 and supplied sugar to several countries, mainly the United States of America. It was involved in the Battle of the Caribbean during World War II when it was part of the Allies supported by the United States. After the Cuban Revolution overthrew Fulgencio Batista's government, the Cuban Rebel Army under Fidel Castro's leadership was reorganized into the current armed forces of Cuba.

During the Cold War, the Soviet Union granted military and financial aid to Cuba. From 1966 until the late 1980s, Soviet Government military assistance enabled Cuba to upgrade its military capabilities to number one in Latin America and project power abroad. In 1961, the first Cuban military mission in Africa was established in Ghana. In 1963, Cuba's military forces appeared in Algeria, when a military medical brigade came to support the government.

In 1966 and 1967, Cuban forces landed in Venezuelan coast to support the leftist guerilla of the FALN. Since the 1960s, Cuba sent military forces to African and Arab countries – Syria in 1973, Ethiopia in 1978, Angola from 1975 to 1989, and Nicaragua, El Salvador and reportedly Afghanistan during the 1980s. The tonnage of Soviet military deliveries to Cuba throughout most of the 1980s exceeded deliveries in any year since the military build-up during the 1962 Cuban Missile Crisis.

In 1989, the government instituted a clean-up of the armed forces and the Ministry of Interior, convicting army Major General and Hero of the Republic of Cuba Arnaldo Ochoa, Ministry of Interior Colonel Antonio de la Guardia (Tony la Guardia), and Ministry of Interior Brigadier General Patricio de la Guardia on charges of corruption and drug trafficking. This judgment is known in Cuba as "Causa 1" (Cause 1). Ochoa and Antonio de la Guardia were executed. Following the executions, the Army was drastically downsized, the Ministry of Interior was moved under the informal control of Revolutionary Armed Forces chief General Raúl Castro (Fidel Castro's brother), and large numbers of army officers were moved into the Ministry of Interior.

In 1998, the U.S. Defense Intelligence Agency reported that Cuba's paramilitary organizations, the Territorial Militia Troops, the Youth Labor Army, and the Naval Militia had suffered considerable morale and training degradation over the previous seven years but still retained the potential to "make an enemy invasion costly." Cuba adopted a militia focused "war of the people" strategy that highlights the defensive nature of its capabilities.

Cuban military power was sharply reduced by the loss of Soviet subsidies following the end of the Cold War, and today the Revolutionary Armed Forces number 39,000 regular troops.

In April 2021, longtime Chief of Staff Álvaro López Miera took over as the Minister of the Revolutionary Armed Forces.

== Army ==
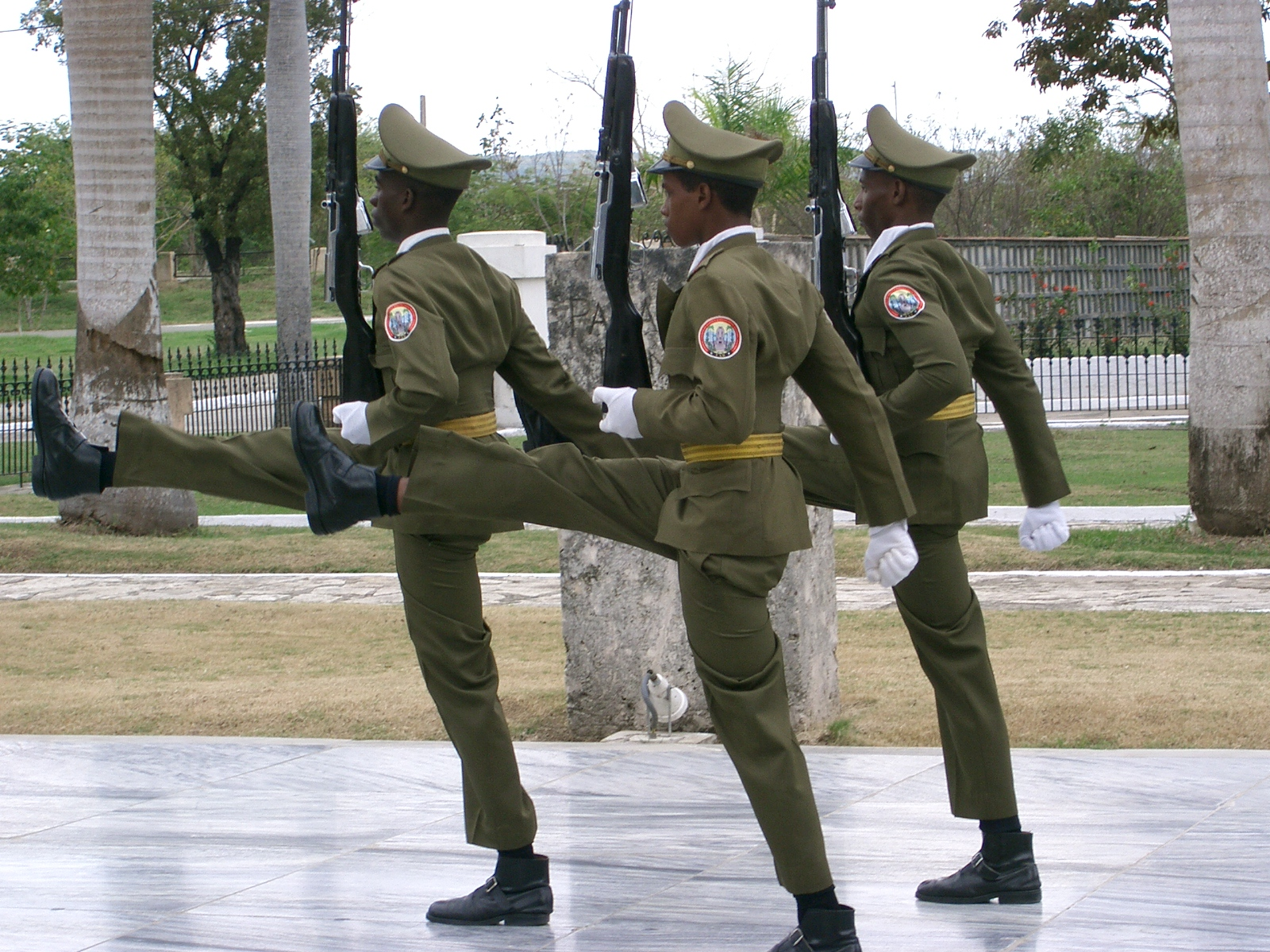
Guards at the Mausoleum of José Martí, Santiago de Cuba

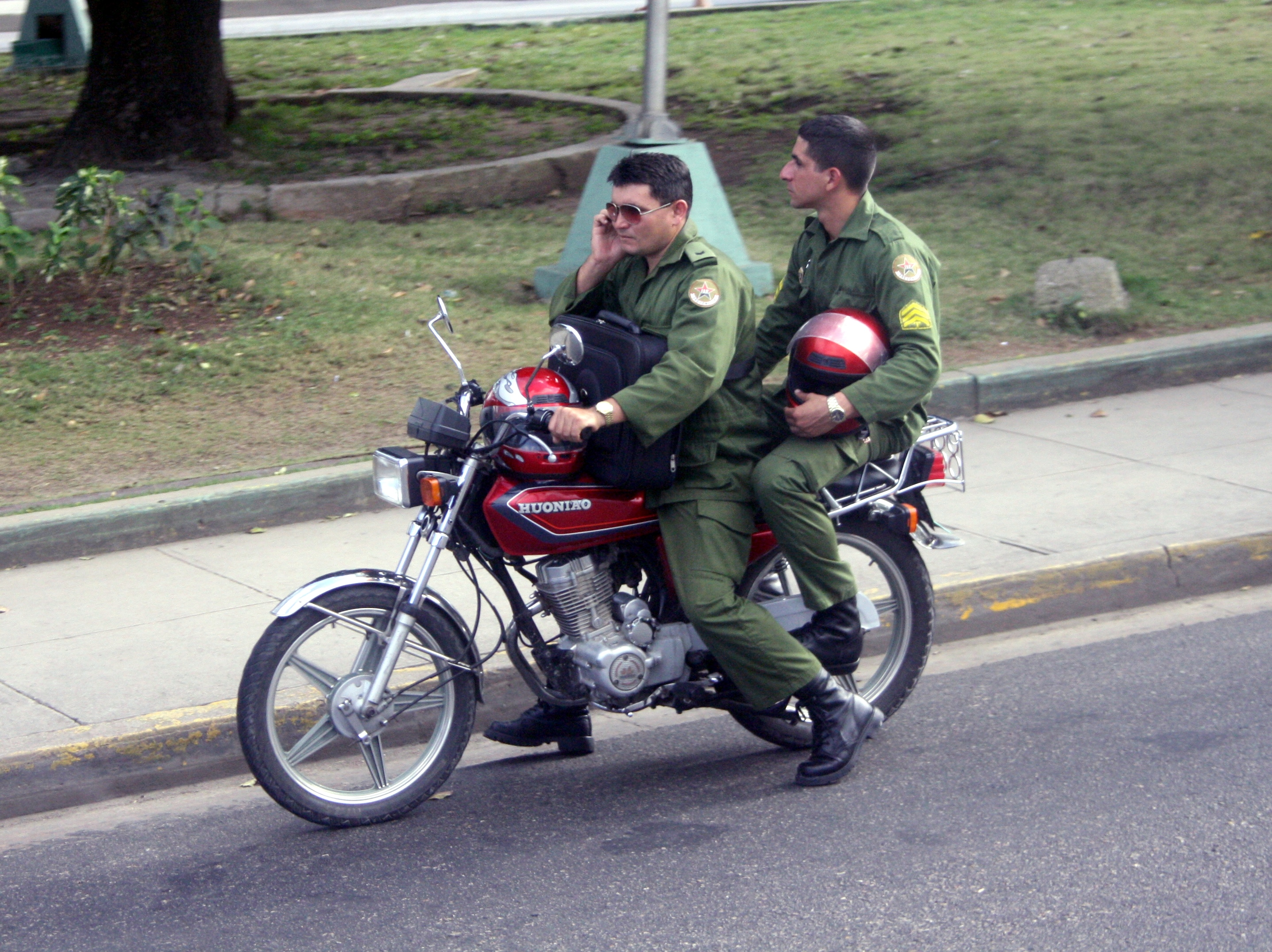
Soldiers of Fuerzas Armadas Revolucionarias on a motorbike

In May 1979, the Central Intelligence Agency wrote that when "the economy took a downturn in 1970, the Castro regime, partly at Soviet urging, reduced its forces by some 60 per cent, eventually freeing more than 150,000 people for full-time civilian employment. All branches of the armed services except the Air Force were affected noticeably. The Air Defence Force shrank from six brigades and 24 occupied SA-2 surface-to-air missile sites, down to three brigades and 18 sites, leaving eastern Cuba unprotected by surface-to-air missiles. The Navy lost a number of radar surveillance posts, again to the detriment of eastern Cuba. The Army was more than halved in size and reorganised."

In 1984, there were three major geographical commands, Western, Central, and Eastern. There were 130,000 personnel. Each command was garrisoned by an army, comprising a single armored division, a mechanized division, and a corps of three infantry divisions. The Eastern Command had two corps, totaling six divisions. There was also an independent military region, with a single infantry division, which garrisoned the Isle of Youth.

In 1998, a U.S. Defense Intelligence Agency assessment said that the army's armor and artillery units were at low readiness levels due to 'severely reduced' training, generally incapable of mounting effective operations above the battalion level, and that equipment was mostly in storage and unavailable at short notice. The report said that Cuban special operations forces continue to train but on a smaller scale than beforehand, and that while the lack of replacement parts for its existing equipment and the current severe shortage of fuel were increasingly affecting operational capabilities, Cuba remained able to offer considerable resistance to any regional power.

== Air and Air Defence Force ==
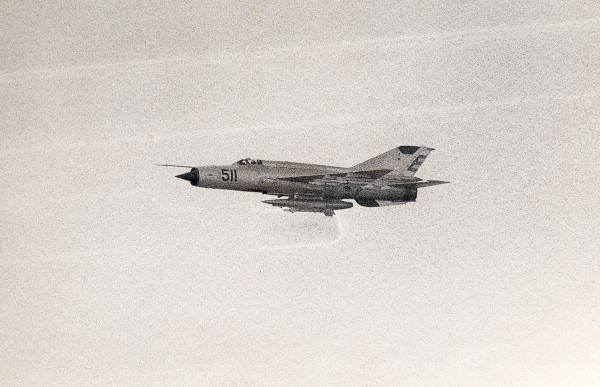
A Cuban MiG-21MF in the 1970s

In the 1980s, the Cuban Revolutionary Air and Air Defence Force (DAAFAR) projected power abroad, with Soviet assistance, especially in Africa. Cuba sent jet fighters and transports for deployment in conflict zones such as Angola and Ethiopia.

In 1990, Cuba's Air Force was the best equipped in Latin America. The modern Cuban Air Force had approximately 230 fixed-wing aircraft. In the early 2000s, with no exact figure available, Western analysts estimated that at least 130 of these planes were still in service, with only 25 operational, spread out among the thirteen military airbases on the island.

In 1996, fighters from the DAAFAR shot down two Cessna aircraft based in Florida which were incorrectly suspected of dropping leaflets into Cuban airspace. The air force was criticised for not giving the pilots of the aircraft options other than being shot down. One aircraft escaped.

In 1998, according to the same DIA report mentioned above, the air force had "fewer than 24 operational Mikoyan-Gurevich (MiG) fighters; pilot training barely adequate to maintain proficiency; a declining number of fighter sorties, surface-to-air missiles and anti-aircraft guns to respond to attacking air forces."

In 2007, the International Institute for Strategic Studies assessed the force as 8,000 strong, with 41 combat capable aircraft and a further 188 stored. DAAFAR is known now to have acquired another MiG-29 and a few MiG-23s, giving it 58 combat aircraft in active service. These are listed as 6 MiG-29s, 40 MiG-23s, and 12 MiG-21s. The IISS also estimated that DAAFAR had 12 operational transport aircraft, plus trainers which include 8 L-39C, and helicopters, mainly Mil Mi-8, Mil Mi-17, and Mil Mi-24 Hind.

In 2010, Raúl Castro ordered that all MiG-29 pilots had to have full training. They now have from 200–250 hours of flight annually, together with real dogfight training and exercises. Up to 20 MiG-23 units have this kind of training. The other 16 MiG-23 units spend more time in simulators than real flight. MiG-21 units have limited time in these training exercises and spend more time in simulators and maintain their skills flying with Aerogaviota, the commercial brand of the air force.

== Navy ==
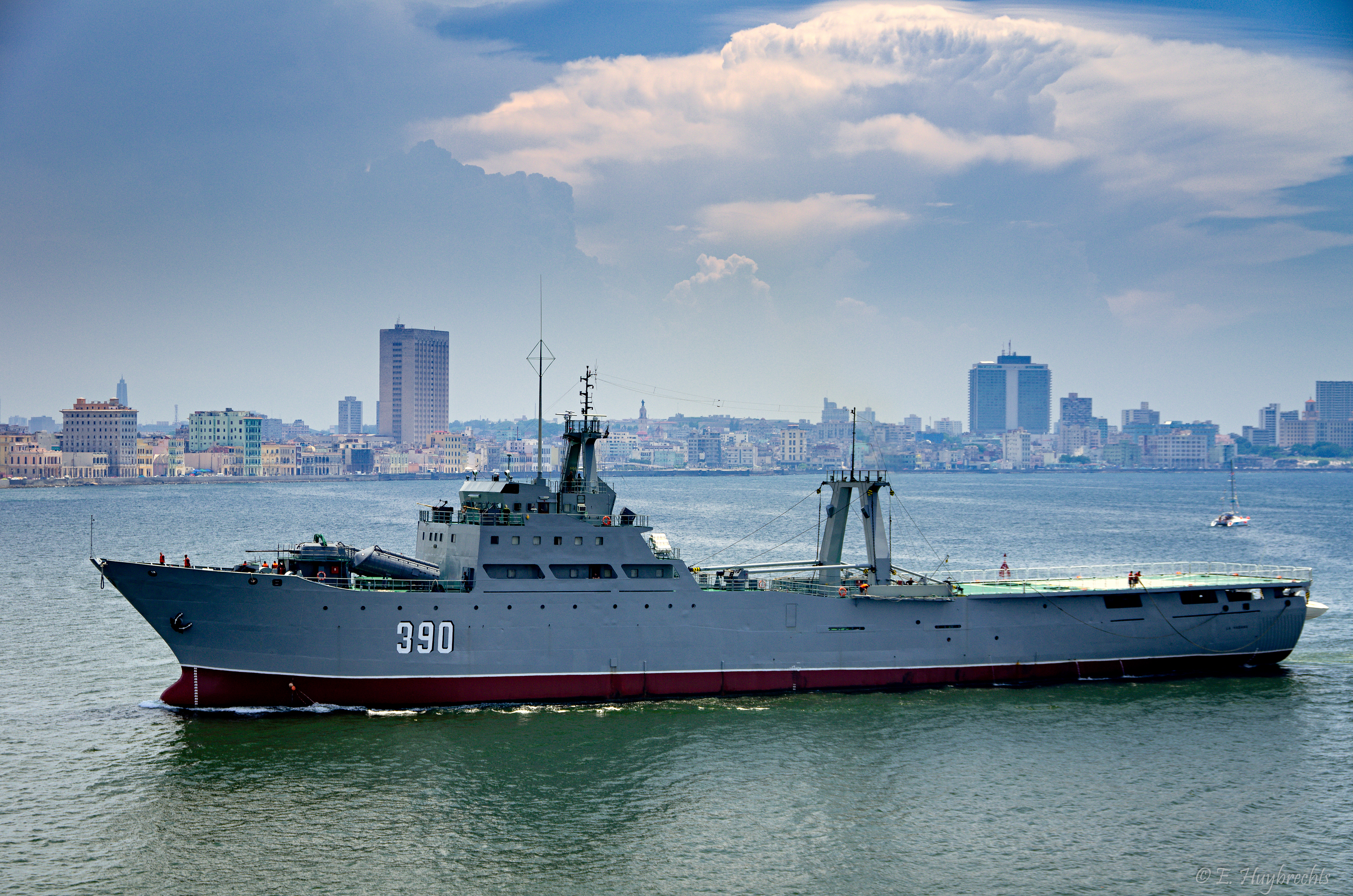
The helicopter carrier patrol vessel Rio Damuji n° 390 in Havana, July 2011

In 1988, the Cuban Navy had 12,000 men, three submarines, two modern guided-missile frigates, one intelligence vessel, and a large number of patrol craft and minesweepers. However, most of the Soviet-made vessels have been decommissioned or sunk to make reefs. By 2007, the Cuban Navy was assessed as being 3,000 strong (including up to 550+ Navy Infantry) by the IISS with six Osa-II missile boats and one Pauk-class corvette. The Cuban Navy also includes a small marine battalion called the Desembarco de Granma. It once numbered 550 men, though its present size is not known.

After the old Soviet submarines were put out of service, Cuba searched for help from North Korea's experience in midget submarines. North Korean defectors claimed to have seen Cubans in mid to late 1990s in a secret submarine base. Years later, a single picture became public of a small black native submarine in Havana harbor. It is rumored to be called 'Delfin' and is to be armed with two torpedoes. Only a single boat is in service and the design appears original, even if influenced both by North Korea and Soviet designs.

The Cuban Navy rebuilt one, large ex-Spanish Rio Damuji fishing boat. BP-390 is now armed with two C-201W missiles, one twin 57 mm gun mount, two twin 25 mm gun mounts and on 14.5 mm machine gun. This vessel is larger than the Koni class, and it is used as a helicopter carrier patrol vessel. A second unit (BP-391) was converted and entered service in 2016.

The Cuban Navy today operates its own missile systems, the made-in-Cuba Bandera (a copy of the dated Styx Soviet missiles) and Remulgadas anti-ship missile systems, as well as the nationally produced Frontera self-propelled coastal defence multiple rocket launcher. The navy's principal threats are drug smuggling and illegal immigration. The country's geographical position and limited naval presence has enabled traffickers to utilise Cuban territorial waters and airspace.

The Cuban Navy's air wing is an ASW helicopter operator only and is equipped with 2 Mi-14 Haze helicopters.

== Air and Naval air bases ==
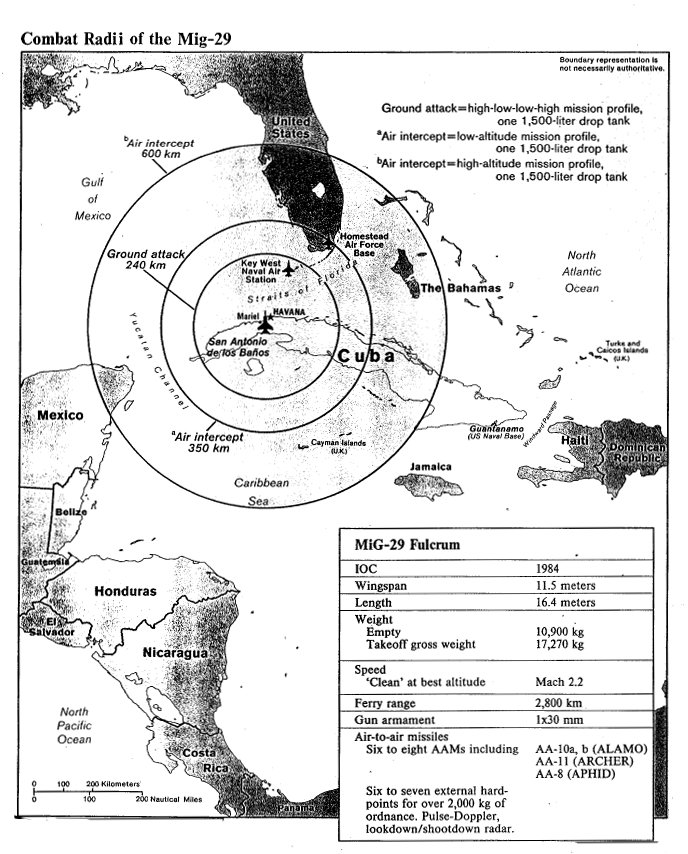
A 1990 CIA map showing the estimated range of Cuban MiG-29 Fulcrum jets.

=== Active bases ===
- Cabañas (HQ Western Command) – San Julián Air Base (MUSJ)
  - 23rd Regiment (Mikoyan-Gurevich MiG-23ML)
  - Primary Training (Antonov An-2)
  - 1650 Combat Training (Mikoyan-Gurevich MiG-21UM)
  - Combat Training Squadron (Mikoyan-Gurevich MiG-21PFMA and Mikoyan-Gurevich MiG-21MF)
  - Rwy 01/19 2,041 m (6,695 ft)
  - Rwy 08/26 2,584 m (8,479 ft)
  - Naval Base?
- Alameda del Siboney
  - 23° 5'25"N, 82°28'45"W and 22°58'45"N, 82°59'15"W
- Holguín (HQ Eastern Command) – Frank País Airport (MUHG)
  - 1724 Interceptor Regiment (Mikoyan-Gurevich MiG-23BN bomber)
  - 3710 Interceptor Squadron and Training
  - 34th Tactical Regiment
  - Naval Base?
- Havana – Playa Baracoa Airport (MUPB)
  - 3405th Executive Squadron
  - 3404 Transport Squadron
  - 3688 Transport Regiment
- Havana – José Martí Airport (MUHA)
  - 25th Transport Regiment (Ilyushin Il-76 and Antonov An-32)
  - Rwy 06/24, Size: 4,001 m (13,125 ft)
- La Coloma Airport (MULM)
  - 1660 Training Squadron (Aero L-39 AlbatrosC)
- Casablanca, Havana naval base
  - homeport for the navy's two frigates
- there are naval facilities in Cienfuegos (patrol vessels docked near Museo Historico Naval Nacional in Cayo Loco area), Mariel (near shipyard/container port), Nicaro and Punta Movida.

=== Inactive bases ===
- Mariel – Mariel Airfield (MUML) – now container terminal
  - former anti-submarine helicopter squadron (Ka-32 and Mil Mi-14PL)
- Campo de Columbia – renamed Campo Libertad in 1961 (MULB)
  - 26th Transport Regiment (Mil Mi-2 and Mil Mi-8)
  - Training Squadron (Aero L-39 AlbatrosC and Z-326T)
  - 2,065 m (6,775 ft runway)
- Campo Teniente Brihuega
- Playa Baracoa – Playa Baracoa Airfield (MUPB)
  - 22nd Regiment
- Nicaro Airport (MUNC)
  - abandoned airfield 1,315 m (single 4,314 ft runway)
- Punta Movida
  - Soviet built base
- Cienfuegos Airport (Jaime González Air Station) (MUCF)
  - single 2/20 runway 1,510 m (4,954 ft)
  - 15th Transport Regiment (Antonov An-2 and Antonov An-26)
  - 16th Helicopter Regiment (Mil Mi-8, Mil Mi-14, Mil Mi-17)
- Güines
  - 24 Tactical Regiment (Mikoyan-Gurevich MiG-23BN)
- Santiago de Cuba – Antonio Maceo Airport (MUCU)
  - 35th Transport Regiment (Antonov An-2 and Antonov An-26)
  - 36 Helicopter Regiment (Mil Mi-8 and Mil Mi-24)
  - Rwy 09/27 4,000 m (13,123 ft)
  - Rwy 18/36 1,296 m (4,252 ft)
- San Antonio de los Baños Airport (MUSA)
  - 21st Regiment (Mikoyan-Gurevich MiG-21B)
  - 1724 Regiment
  - 3 Runways
    - Rwy 01/19 2,400 m (7,873 ft)
    - Rwy 05/23 3,596 m (11,799 ft)
    - Rwy 12/30 2,482 m (8,144 ft)
- Santa Clara – Abel Santa María Airport (MUSC)
  - 14th Tactical Regiment (Mikoyan-Gurevich MiG-23BN) bomber
  - Rwy 08/26 3,017 m (9,898 ft)
- Santa Cruz
  - 11 Regiment (Mikoyan-Gurevich MiG-21B)
- Sancti Spíritus – Sancti Spiritus Airport (MUSS)
  - 12th Regiment (Mikoyan-Gurevich MiG-21MF)
  - Rwy 03/21 1,801 m (5,908 ft)
- Camagüey – Ignacio Agramonte Airport (MUCM)
  - 31st Regiment – Mikoyan-Gurevich MiG-21MF fighters
  - Rwy 07/25 3,000 m (9,842 ft)

== Special Forces ==
The Avispas Negras (English: Black Wasps), also known formally as the Mobile Brigade of Special Troops (BMTE) is a special forces unit in the Cuban Revolutionary Armed Forces. It is often identified as Military Unit 4895.

Desembarco de Granma is a small marine battalion with a Marines like role.

== Paramilitary forces ==
=== Territorial Troops Militia ===
The Territorial Troops Militia is composed exclusively of civilian volunteers, under the command of MINFAR. It reinforced the notion of the popular will to defend the Revolution. In general, the militia is a part-time force with only light arms that are issued only on occasion.

=== Youth Labor Army ===
The Youth Labor Army (Ejercito Juvenil del Trabajo – EJT) is, by law, a paramilitary organization under the direct control of MINFAR. It was established in August 1973 by combining the Centennial Youth Column (CJC) and the Permanent Infantry Divisions (DIP). Cuba's compulsory service laws require all male citizens to serve for three years in the EJT. The formation of the EJT allowed the army to devote itself full time to military matters. The EJT served as a reserve force in its first 20 years. In 1993, it was assigned the responsibility of managing the state farms.

=== Border Troops ===
The Border Troops of the Republic of Cuba (Spanish: Tropas Guardafronteras, TGF) protect the state borders and territorial waters. They are subordinate to the Interior Ministry (MININT). The Border Troops were established in September 1970. In the late 1970s, several agreements were signed relating to border protection, including a 1976 agreement between Cuba and Mexico on the delimitation of the exclusive economic zone in the sector of the Cuban-Mexican maritime border, and a 1977 agreement on the maritime border between Cuba and Haiti. The Border Troops are de facto both a border guard and a coast guard force. All new officers are commissioned from the Granma Naval Academy.

== Military schools ==
- Technical Military Institute, originally designed as the Colegio de Belén, Havana, is located at 45th and 66th streets in Marianao, Havana, Cuba.
- Máximo Gómez Command Academy – succeeded the El Morro Academy, current command college of the CRAF
- National Defense College of Cuba
- Camilo Cienfuegos Military Schools System – founded 1962, with 20 campuses in many cities, official military high school
- Jose Maceo Military College – officer cadet school of the Ground Force
- Antonio Maceo Military College
- Granma Naval Academy
- Jose Marti Military Technical Institute – current officer cadet school of the technical services and the Air Force
- Military Medical University of Cuba
- Arides Sánchez Military Justice School

== See also ==
- Cuban military internationalism
- List of wars involving Cuba
- Military history of Cuba
- National Revolutionary Police Force
