= Ciudad Libertad Airport =

Defunct airport in Cuba

- IATA: none; ICAO: MULB

Summary
- Airport type: Defunct
- Serves: Havana, Cuba
- Elevation AMSL: 30 m (98 ft)
- Coordinates: 23°05′38″N 082°26′17″W

Map
- Location in Cuba

Runways
Direction	Length		Surface
Direction	m	ft	Surface
08/26	2,065	6,775	Asphalt
- Source: DAFIF

Ciudad Libertad Airport (ICAO: MULB) is a defunct airport near Havana, Cuba. and formerly known as El Aeropuerto de Columbia. Located in the borough of Playa, it was Cuba's main airport until 1930, when it was replaced by José Martí International Airport. The airport was also the location of the 1960 Cuban Grand Prix. Two days prior to the Bay of Pigs Invasion in 1961 the airport was bombed by US planes. It previously had two runways, but only one remains. It is now a school.

== Facilities ==
The former airport resides at an elevation of 30 m (98 ft) above mean sea level. It had one runway designated 08/26 with an asphalt surface measuring 2,065 m × 50 m (6,775 ft × 164 ft).
