= Leopoldo Cintra Frías =

Cuban military and political leader

Corps General Leopoldo Cintra Frías
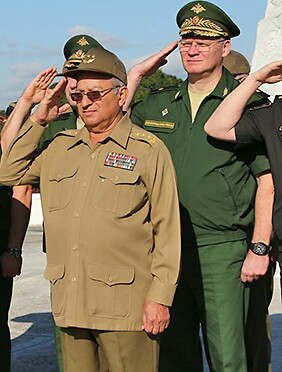
- Frías (left) in 2015
- Born: 17 July 1941 (age 85); Yara, Cuba
- Military career
- Allegiance: Cuba
- Branch: Cuban Revolutionary Armed Forces
- Service years: 1957–2021
- Rank: Corps General
- Commands: Minister of the Revolutionary Armed Forces
- Conflicts: Cuban Revolution; Battle of Pino del Agua; Bay of Pigs Invasion; Ethiopian Civil War; Angolan Civil War; Battle of Cuito Cuanavale
- Awards: Hero of the Republic of Cuba

Leopoldo Cintra Frías (born 17 July 1941) is a retired Cuban military officer and political leader. Cintra was the former Minister of the Revolutionary Armed Forces of Cuba.

== Military career ==
He participated in the Cuban Revolution in November 1957 at the age of 16. His first actions were to sell bonds, distribute bread in a van, and transport people to the mountains. He later joined the Column 1 José Martí, which was commanded by Fidel Castro, where he remained until the end of the revolution. He accompanied Fidel Castro on his journey from the Oriente Province to Havana, in the commonly known Freedom Caravan. Cintra was sent to Prague (Czechoslovakia) to study Artillery in 1960. Upon his return to Cuba, he was appointed head of the artillery and infantry units in the FAR.

He finished his studies at the Superior Basic School in 1962 and passed the Superior Academic Course in 1967. Cintra led a large unit of Cuban tanks in Angola and Ethiopia in the late 1970s and in the early 1980s. He graduated in 1982 from the Military Academy of the General Staff of the Armed Forces of the USSR. In 1990, he was appointed the Chief of the Western Army, one of the three regional districts of the FAR. Upon his return to Cuba, he continued lead of the Western Army.

In 2001, he was promoted to the rank of Corps General. In October 2008, Cintra held the position of First Deputy Minister of the Revolutionary Armed Forces. President Raúl Castro promoted him to the post of Minister of the Revolutionary Armed Forces on November 9, 2011, following the death of General Julio Casas Regueiro. On April 15, 2021, Cintra departed as Minister of the FAR and was replaced with his Chief of Staff Álvaro López Miera.

== See also ==
- Cuban Revolutionary Armed Forces
- Raúl Castro
- Julio Casas Regueiro
- Ministry of the Revolutionary Armed Forces (Cuba)
- Council of Ministers of Cuba
