= Abelardo Colomé Ibarra =

Cuban politician

Corps General Abelardo Colomé Ibarra (born 13 September 1939 in Santiago de Cuba, Oriente Province, Cuba) was a Vice President of the Council of State of Cuba and the Cuban Minister of the Interior, serving in the latter position from 1989, until his retirement in October, 2015.

== Career ==
Ibarra was a founding member of the 26th of July Movement. Following the collapse of the Batista regime in Cuba, Ibarra attempted to organise Cuban military expeditions to help local revolutionaries overthrow the governments of Bolivia and Argentina. In December 1975, he was named the head of the first Cuban military mission to Angola. Ibarra reportedly drove to the Cuban and Angolan front lines to personally supervise the defence against National Union for the Total Independence of Angola (UNITA) forces, backed by invading South African troops.

Ibarra is a member of the Central Committee of the Communist Party of Cuba. He bears the title Hero of the Republic of Cuba, and holds the Order of Máximo Gómez in recognition of, in Fidel Castro's own words, "his extraordinary merits in the insurrectional struggle against the tyranny and the imperialist neocolonial domination, the struggle for the consolidation and defense of the socialist state, and the accomplishment of heroic internationalist missions."

== Victory of the Cuban Revolution ==
At the victory of the Cuban Revolution, in April 1959 Abelardo was appointed Chief of the Intelligence Directorate of the Rebel Army. He was part of Fidel Castro's support after the visit of the United Nations Organization.

It is believed that it was Colomé Ibarra who informed Fidel Castro in Havana that Hubert Matos would take up arms. In 1961, Efigenio Ameijeiras requested his support for the National Revolutionary Police, where he assumed the leadership of the Motorized Police, the same with which he fought during the Invasion of the Bay of Pigs.

In 1962 he began to work in the Military Counterintelligence of the Armed Forces, fulfilling internationalist combat missions in Bolivia and Argentina, where he entered with a false Algerian passport to meet Jorge Masetti. In Bolivia, he bought a 4-hectare farm in Cochabamba, close to Emborozu, south of Tarijas and close to Argentina.

He fought alongside Samuel Rodiles Planas and Raúl Díaz-Argüelles in the Cuban military brigade in Algeria, participating in the same way in the preparation of the guerrillas that fought with Che Guevara in the Congo, former Zaire in addition to getting involved in the organization of guerrilla groups in Guinea-Bissau for the African Party for the Independence of Guinea and Cape Verde.

Colomé participated in the location of military and intelligence devices in South Yemen and Somalia, in addition to fulfilling infiltration and combat missions from Mexico and Central America to Venezuela.

He was Division Chief in the Eastern Army, participating in Operation Mambí in 1968. He organized the Northern Army Corps in Holguín until his appointment as Head of the Directorate of Military Counterintelligence. In 1972, he was appointed Vice Minister of the Armed Forces with powers to replace Minister Raúl Castro in his absence. In 1975, on the death of Raúl Díaz-Argüelles in Angola, he was sent to combat replacing him against South African forces and UNITA. In 1976 he was Military Chief of all Cuban troops in Angola.

Colomé was Head of the 10th. Directorate of Military Intelligence. He was in charge of the espionage carried out between the socialist countries and members of NATO. Colomé Ibarra was in charge of carrying out the investigations and arrests in the case of General Arnaldo Ochoa Sánchez. After the trial against General José Abrantes, he was appointed Minister of the Interior until October 26, 2015, when he requested his resignation, in a letter sent to President Raúl. The Council of State agreed to award him the First Degree Order for the Service to the Fatherland for his standard career.

== See also ==
- Ministry of the Interior of Cuba

Political offices
Preceded by Ramiro Valdés Menéndez	Minister of the Interior (1989–2015)	Succeeded by Carlos Fernández Gondín
