= Álvaro López Miera =

Cuban politician

Corps General Álvaro López Miera
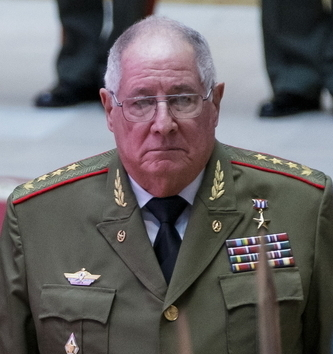
- Born: 26 December 1943 (age 82); Havana, Cuba
- Military career
- Allegiance: Cuba
- Branch: Cuban Revolutionary Armed Forces
- Service years: 1957–present
- Rank: Corps General
- Commands: Minister of the Revolutionary Armed Forces
- Conflicts: Cuban Revolution; Angolan Civil War; Ethiopian Civil War; 2026 Cuban Crisis
- Awards: Hero of the Republic of Cuba

Corps General Álvaro López Miera (born December 26, 1943) is a Cuban military and political leader and has served as the Minister of the Revolutionary Armed Forces of Cuba since 15 April 2021.

== Military career ==
He was born in the City of Havana on December 26, 1943 into a family of progressive Republican Spaniards who escaped the Spanish Civil War. Later he moved to the city of Santiago de Cuba, where he spent part of his childhood and attended primary school.

While still a child, he collaborated with the 26th of July Movement, joining at just 14 years of age the Forces of the II Eastern Front "Frank País" as a combatant during the Cuban Revolution. After the revolution, he served in the first Artillery units. In the 70s, he served in the Angolan Civil War, participating in combative actions in Catofe, Morros del Tongo, Santa Comba, Altohama, Tchipipa, Nova Lisboa, Catata, Caconda, Sa da Bandeira and Cahama. Upon his return, he was appointed Chief of Operations of the High Command's Reserve Artillery Brigade.

In 1977 he completed his second mission in the Derg of Ethiopia. From 1982 to 1984, he studied at the General Staff Academy, at the end of which he began to work as Chief of General Troops. In 1987, he returned to the People's Republic of Angola, to fulfill his third internationalist mission, this time as Chief of General Troops. Upon returning to Cuba, he was appointed Substitute Chief of Staff for the Chief of the Eastern Army until 1993, when he was promoted to Deputy Chief of the General Staff. In 1997, he replaced General Ulises Rosales del Toro as Chief of the General Staff. In 2001 he was promoted to the rank of Corps General. On April 15, 2021, Álvaro López Miera became the Minister of the FAR, replacing Leopoldo Cintra Frías.

== Other information ==
He is a member of the Communist Party of Cuba, being a delegate from the II Congress and being appointed to the Politburo of the Communist Party of Cuba in 1997. He is a Deputy to the National Assembly of People's Power. He was decorated in Moscow by the Russian Union of Veterans of Angola.

On 22 July 2021, López Miera was added to the United States' OFAC sanctions list.
