= Battle of Quifangondo =

Battle of the Angolan Civil War

- Part of the Angolan Civil War
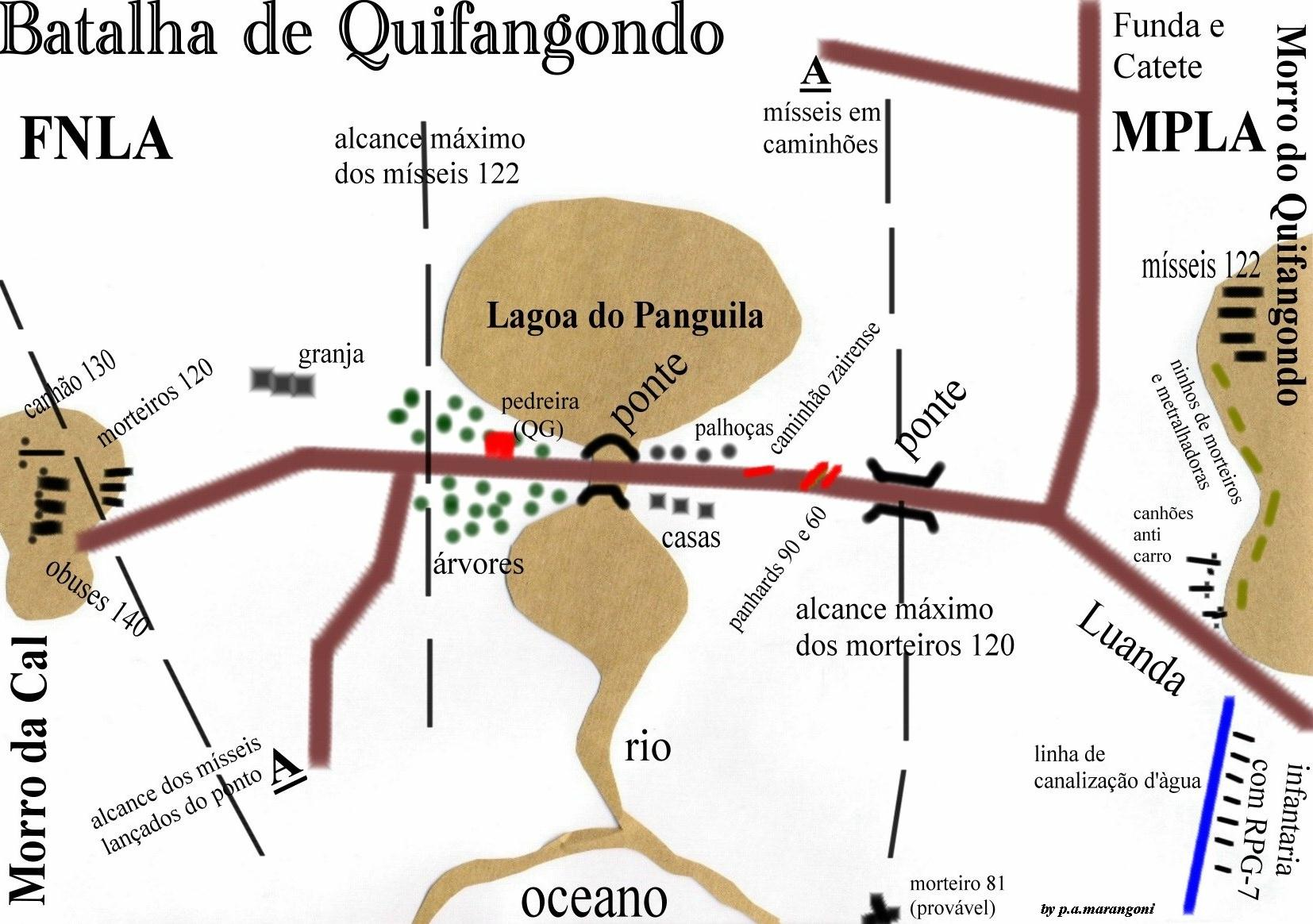
- Map depicting ELNA's advance along the Caxito-Luanda highway towards Quifangondo, by Pedro Marangoni.
Date	10 November 1975
Location	Quifangondo, Luanda Province, Angola 8°45′29″S 13°25′21″E
Result	FAPLA victory

Belligerents
MPLA (FAPLA); Cuba	FNLA (ELNA); Zaire; South Africa

Commanders and leaders
Roberto Leal Ramos Monteiro "Ngongo"; António França "N'Dalu"; David Moises "Ndozi"; Raúl Díaz-Argüelles	Holden Roberto; Gilberto Manuel Santos e Castro; Manima Lama; Ben Roos; Jack Bosch

Units involved
FAPLA 9th Brigade	4th Zairean Commando Battalion; 7th Zairean Commando Battalion; 14 South African Field Artillery Regiment

Strength
~1,000; FAPLA 850–1,000 militants 6 Grad-P rocket launchers 12 field guns; Cuba 88 artillerymen and advisers 6 BM-21 rocket launchers	3,000+; ELNA 1,000–2,000 militants 120 Portuguese volunteers 12 armoured vehicles 6 jeeps; Zaire 1,200 army regulars 2 field guns; South Africa 52 artillerymen and advisers 3 field guns 3 bomber aircraft

Casualties and losses
FAPLA 1 dead 3 wounded; Cuba 2 wounded	ELNA 120 confirmed dead (Note: ELNA's official casualty count confirms 120 dead at Quifangondo. South African and Western estimates of the total number of ELNA dead usually run into the hundreds.) 200 wounded 4 armoured vehicles destroyed 6 jeeps destroyed; Zaire 8 confirmed dead (Note: 8 Zairean artillerymen were killed at Quifangondo. No estimates of the total number of Zairean dead have ever been released; the combined Zairean and ELNA infantry death toll may run into the multiple hundreds.) 8 confirmed wounded 1 captured 2 field guns destroyed; South Africa 1 wounded

The Battle of Quifangondo (popularly known as Nshila wa Lufu, or Battle of Death Road in Kikongo) was fought on 10 November 1975, near the strategic settlement of Quifangondo, Luanda Province, between the People's Armed Forces of Liberation of Angola (FAPLA), armed wing of the People's Movement for the Liberation of Angola (MPLA), and the National Liberation Army of Angola (ELNA), armed wing of the National Liberation Front of Angola (FNLA). The engagement marked the first major deployment of rocket artillery in the Angolan Civil War, as well as the last serious attempt by ELNA forces to seize Luanda, the Angolan capital. It occurred on the last day of Portuguese colonial rule in the country, which formally received independence only hours later.

After defeating a FAPLA garrison at the nearby town of Caxito, an army of ELNA militants led personally by Holden Roberto began advancing southwards towards Luanda. Roberto's forces included a composite battery of three BL 5.5-inch Medium Guns and two 130 mm Type 59 field guns manned by Zairean and South African artillery crews. Their objective was to dislodge FAPLA from the vital waterworks at Quifangondo and an adjoining bridge which spanned the Bengo River. Air cover for the ELNA offensive was provided by a squadron of South African English Electric Canberra bombers. The defenders consisted of FAPLA's 9th Brigade and just under a hundred Cuban military advisers, bolstered by a composite battery of ZiS-3 anti-tank guns and Grad rocket launchers.

Following a poorly coordinated artillery bombardment and an ineffectual South African air strike, ELNA and Zairean infantry attacked the bridge early on the morning on 10 November, but became trapped in the open while crossing an elevated roadway and shelled by the defenders' rockets. The ELNA advance stalled, and the attackers were unable to regain their initiative. Roberto committed his reserves, but by noon his entire force had been routed with heavy casualties and nearly all their vehicles destroyed. The ELNA forces broke into a disorderly retreat and could only be re-mustered the following day. Realising the battle was lost, the South African and Zairean artillery crews withdrew to the nearby port of Ambriz and were later evacuated by their respective governments.

While the battle was taking place, Portugal renounced its claims to Angolan sovereignty and withdrew the remainder of its colonial administrative and military personnel from Luanda. On the morning of 11 November, the MPLA proclaimed the People's Republic of Angola, which was immediately recognised by Cuba, the Soviet Union, Brazil, and several sympathetic African states. ELNA had suffered such a catastrophic defeat at Quifangondo that Roberto was unable to launch another major offensive; over the next two months his forces were gradually scattered and destroyed by FAPLA and its Cuban allies.

== Background ==
Since the late fifteenth century, Portugal had administered Angola as part of an African empire which included Mozambique and Portuguese Guinea (modern Cape Verde and Guinea-Bissau). Following the loss of Brazil and the erosion of its influence in the Americas during the early nineteenth century, Portugal increasingly refocused on the consolidation of its African colonies. As the largest, most developed, and most heavily populated colony in the Portuguese Empire, Angola came to replace Brazil as Lisbon's most valuable overseas possession. Angolan nationalists, led by the nascent Angolan Communist Party, periodically challenged colonial rule, to little avail. The trend towards global decolonisation during the late 1940s and 1950s delivered an unprecedented boost to nationalist confidence and ambitions, and in January 1961 the Angolan War of Independence broke out when radicalised peasants launched the Baixa de Cassanje revolt.

Between 1961 and 1964, three major nationalist movements rose to prominence in the fighting between the Portuguese security forces and local anti-colonial militants supported to varying degrees by the Soviet Union, China, and several newly independent African states. The National Front for the Liberation of Angola (FNLA) was led by Holden Roberto and recruited mostly from the Bakongo population of northern Angola and the Cabinda exclave, an area traditionally dominated by the Kingdom of Kongo. In the central highlands and southern Angola, the National Union for the Total Independence of Angola (UNITA) was formed by Jonas Savimbi and drew its recruits from Ovimbundu farm labourers and peasants. The Popular Movement for the Liberation of Angola (MPLA), was formed by the Angolan Communist Party and targeted the embryonic upper working class of public sector workers in Luanda. Most of its senior leaders, namely Agostinho Neto, were professionals and intellectuals educated in European universities. It was in this educated elite that the combination of anti-colonial resentment and exposure to international political theory came to be most articulated; for example, the MPLA invested heavily in lobbying campaigns overseas which won it support and recognition among political leaders in Africa and the Middle East. Its use of Marxist political language and open criticism of the United States in particular proved effective at winning support with the Soviet Union and leftist governments elsewhere.

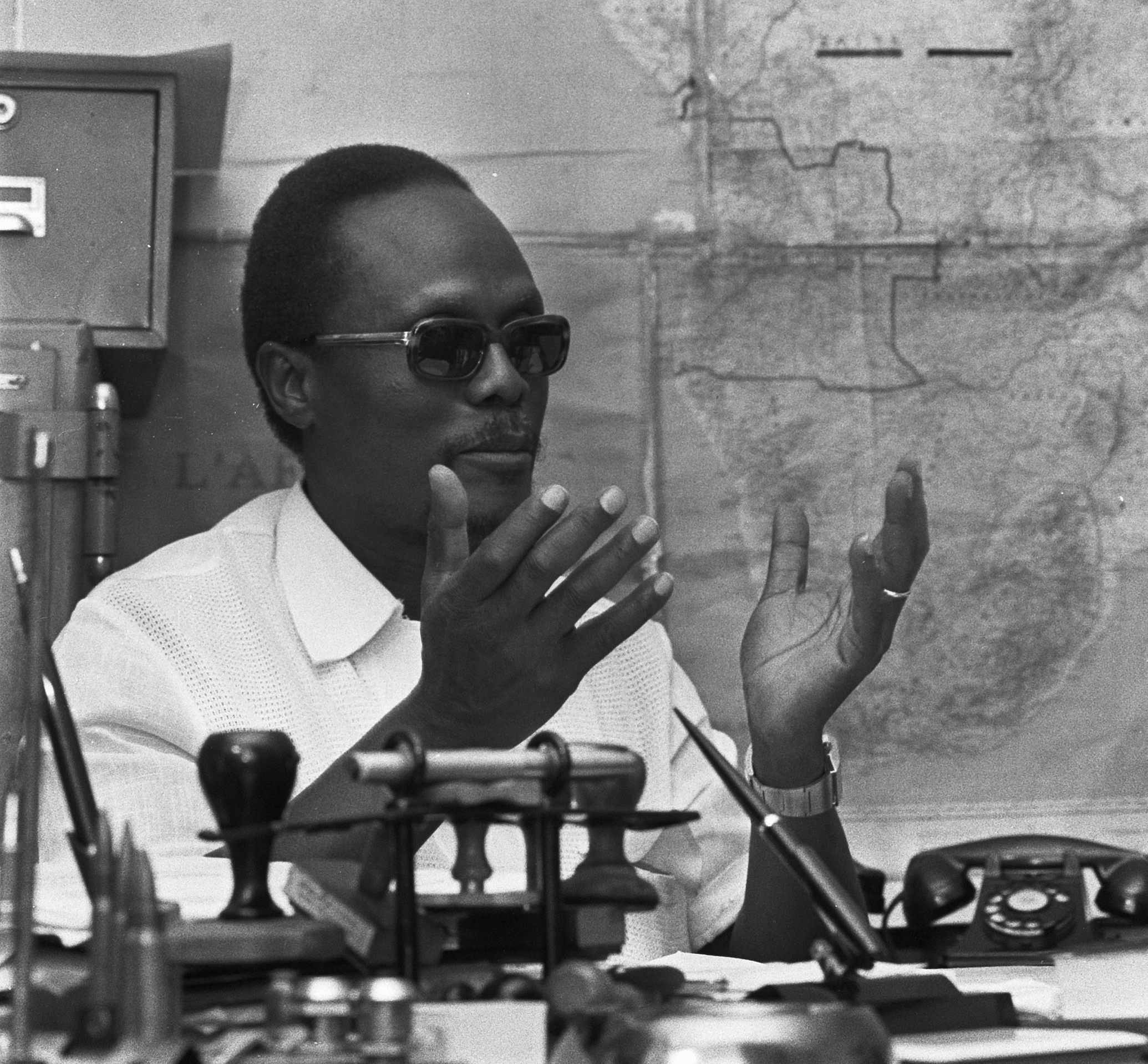
FNLA leader Holden Roberto

All three movements quickly formed militant wings to coordinate their insurgent campaigns against the Portuguese: the FNLA formed the National Liberation Army of Angola (ELNA), UNITA formed the Armed Forces for the Liberation of Angola (FALA), and the MPLA formed the People's Armed Forces of Liberation of Angola (FAPLA). The creation of three separate insurgent armies provoked internecine strife which doomed any attempt to present a united front against the Portuguese and limited their effectiveness on the battlefield. Until the formation of the militant wings, disputes between the movements had been largely confined to political theory. However, beginning in late 1961 there were a number of clashes between ELNA and FAPLA that became central to the rivalry between the FNLA and MPLA, and evolved into outright hostility. It was not uncommon for ELNA to intercept and kill FAPLA personnel who strayed into its area of operations. Hamstrung by violent divisions, the insurgents aggravated the colonial administration but did not threaten its control of the territory.

In late April 1974, Portugal's authoritarian Estado Novo government was toppled by the Carnation Revolution, which sounded the death knell for that country's pretensions as a colonial empire. Angolan nationalists perceived the political upheaval in Lisbon as an opportunity to upend the colonial order; the MPLA, FNLA, and UNITA rejected ceasefire requests and demanded the Portuguese affirm an unconditional right to independence. General António de Spínola, head of the Portuguese provisional government, was initially in favour of retaining the colonies as semi-autonomous federal subjects, but found little support for this measure in the progressive atmosphere which dominated after the revolution. On 27 July 1974, he announced that the colonies were to be granted independence, unconditionally.

By November 1974 the authority and morale of the Portuguese security forces in Angola had been seriously undermined; meanwhile, the three nationalist movements were attempting to exploit the developing power vacuum by amassing troops and stockpiling arms. The nationalists' political and military wings rushed to establish authority on the ground, moving rapidly to take over key towns left unguarded by the withdrawing Portuguese. Massive shipments of foreign arms from their various allies made the movements increasingly more lethal as tensions grew. The insurgents also seized large quantities of Portuguese weapons from the arsenals of disbanding colonial units. As long as their administrative structures were not attacked, the Portuguese made no attempt to enforce internal security, and the nationalists were able to continue their buildup unopposed.

== Prelude ==
=== ELNA expelled from Luanda ===
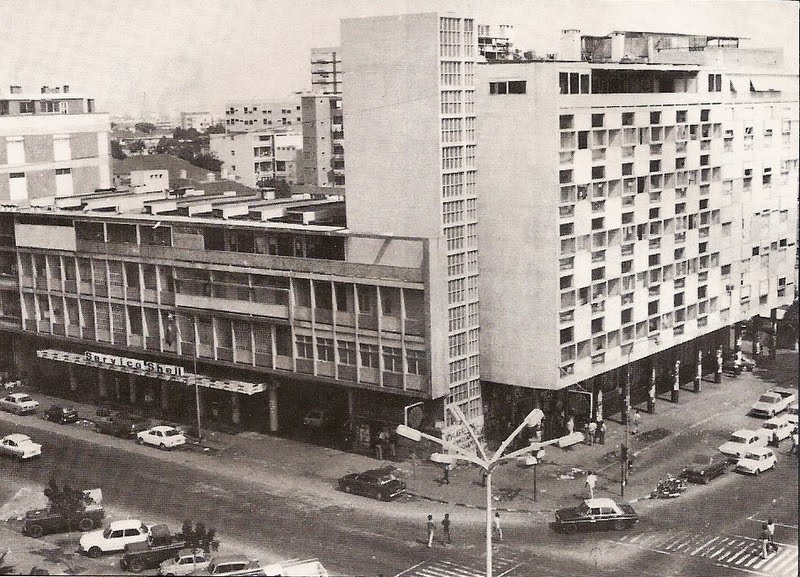
Luanda in the early 1970s, just prior to the civil war

FAPLA benefited most from the erosion of Portuguese rule throughout mid-1974, seizing control of eleven of Angola's sixteen provincial capitals. However, distracted by an internal power struggle between Agostinho Neto and Daniel Chipenda, it was unable to consolidate its control of Luanda. In October, Holden Roberto took advantage of the situation to begin airlifting ELNA troops into Luanda from their training camps in neighbouring Zaire. With each movement extending its influence over the local population, the uneasy peace soon broke down and within a month the capital had erupted into bloody street battles. On 3 January 1975, at the behest of Organisation of African Unity, Neto, Roberto, and UNITA's Savimbi signed an accord in which they agreed to a permanent truce and promised to terminate mutually hostile propaganda. The nationalists then participated in a multi-party conference in Alvor, Portugal, which formed a coalition government of MPLA, FNLA, UNITA, and Portuguese representatives to govern Angola during the interim period. The coalition government would draft a constitution, to be followed by democratic elections. Angola's independence date was set for 11 November 1975, the four hundredth anniversary of the founding of Luanda.

Fighting almost immediately broke out in Luanda again when Neto took advantage of the ceasefire to launch a purge of Chipenda's supporters. The Chipenda faction was largely annihilated, leaving ELNA as the only remaining obstacle to FAPLA control of the city. Chipenda and 2,000 of his surviving troops defected to ELNA around February, which further heightened tensions. ELNA had the largest number of personnel inside Angola at the time, and was further strengthened by over 400 tonnes of weaponry donated by the People's Republic of China and channelled through a sympathetic Zaire. ELNA also benefited from covert financial aid supplied by the American Central Intelligence Agency (CIA). Roberto was pressed by his field commanders to destroy Neto's forces while he held an indisputable advantage in manpower and logistics. On 23 March, ELNA began attacking FAPLA bases in Luanda. A week later, a motorised column of 500 ELNA troops drove into the capital to join the fighting, unopposed by the Portuguese troops on duty. The threat posed by ELNA's troop buildup was proving far more formidable than Neto had anticipated, and near the end of March he appealed to the Soviet Union and Cuba for military backing.

As an ELNA victory in Luanda became more apparent, Soviet policymakers grew increasingly anxious about Angola. They believed that Angola's fate carried heavy implications for the global strategic and diplomatic momentum gained by the Soviet sphere after the end of the Vietnam War. They saw Roberto as an agent of Bakongo tribalism rather than a true revolutionary and assumed that his success would serve the interests of Beijing and Washington. The coincidence of Chinese and American patronage of Roberto was especially alarming, as it seemed to indicate the possibility of a future Sino-American alliance dominating Angola, to the detriment of Soviet interests. The result was approval of Neto's request for a massive increase in Soviet military aid to FAPLA. During March 1975 alone, Soviet pilots flew thirty planeloads of weapons into Brazzaville, where they were unloaded and transported by rail, truck, and ship to waiting FAPLA units around Luanda. In the span of three months, the Soviet Union had airlifted thirty million dollars' worth of weaponry to FAPLA. Neto had received enough new arms to equip an additional 20,000 troops, which proved instrumental in turning the tide against Roberto. Additionally, a Soviet military delegation offered to provide training instructors and logistics staff during well-publicised talks with the MPLA leadership on 25 April. For its part, Cuba deployed a contingent of 230 military advisers and technicians to Angola to assemble Soviet hardware and train an influx of new FAPLA recruits. The first Cuban advisers began arriving in May.

The infusion of Soviet arms helped fuel increasingly heavier confrontations in Luanda and provided the raw material for a major conventional FAPLA counteroffensive. In late May FAPLA violated a short-lived ceasefire by attacking and defeating several ELNA garrisons in the Cuanza Norte, Malanje, and Uíge provinces. Buoyed by these victories, the MPLA Politburo authorised a counteroffensive with the objective of isolating and destroying ELNA in Luanda. Between 3 June and 5 June, FAPLA eliminated the ELNA presence in the Cabinda exclave. The Portuguese succeeded in imposing a ceasefire on 7 June, but this was short-lived: the ELNA units stationed in Luanda had been sapped by the fighting in late May and the FAPLA general staff, detecting weakness, was eager to finish them off. On 9 July, FAPLA and the MPLA's popular militia resumed their counteroffensive, bringing the full weight of their Soviet-supplied weapons, including mortars and T-34-85 tanks, to bear against the lightly armed ELNA infantry. After several days of street battles, FAPLA was in full possession of Luanda, having driven ELNA out of the capital and its outlying suburbs. ELNA released a press statement accusing Cuban advisers of having played a major role in the FAPLA counteroffensive. Placing emphasis on the fact that FAPLA had violated the most recent ceasefire, Roberto announced he was no longer prepared to negotiate peace with Neto. The MPLA responded that it would likewise pursue the war until the FNLA and ELNA were permanently defeated.

=== Zaire and South Africa intervene ===
Following its expulsion from Luanda, ELNA withdrew to the nearby port of Ambriz, where it established its new military headquarters and began planning a counteroffensive on Luanda. Roberto, who had hitherto directed the war effort from Kinshasa, immediately made preparations to return to Angola and manage all ELNA operations personally. He claimed he would capture Luanda before Angolan independence. For the time being, however, he contented himself with preparing for that decisive action. Over the late summer and early fall, ELNA recruited more troops and consolidated its control over most of northern Angola.

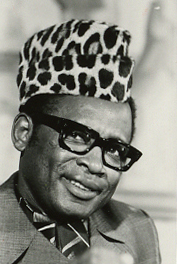
Mobutu Sese Seko, Roberto's personal ally in Zaire, pictured in 1975

ELNA procurement agents turned to Zaire and the United States with requests for more arms, which they needed to counterbalance Soviet and Cuban aid to FAPLA and shift the military balance back in Roberto's favour. The CIA agreed to send fourteen million dollars' worth of materiel collectively to ELNA and FALA, including trucks, radio equipment, small arms, and anti-tank weapons. To keep its involvement covert, it used Zaire as a conduit for the flow of American-made arms to ELNA. Cover was provided through a parallel programme to equip the Zairean Armed Forces. South Africa also offered to provide substantial assistance to ELNA, offering logistical support, small arms, ammunition, and training. South African military advisers under Commandant Jan Breytenbach subsequently entered Angola to begin providing basic training and technical instruction on the weapons provided. South Africa's decision to throw aid behind ELNA and FALA marked the first definitive step toward its own deep embroilment in the Angolan war, the beginning of a series of escalations which would lead to the commitment of regular ground forces on 23 October.

Of all ELNA's external benefactors, Roberto looked optimistically to his personal ally, Zairean president Mobutu Sese Seko, for direct military support. During the early stages of the civil war, the Zairean government had provided aircraft to transport ELNA militants to Luanda. In addition, Zaire furbished ELNA with thousands of obsolete rifles from its own reserve stocks, as well as Panhard AML armoured cars which were airlifted directly to Ambriz. Zairean army regulars—two battalions of paratroops, numbering about 1,200 men—began crossing into Angola on 18 May. Neto complained that Angola was being subject to a "silent invasion by soldiers from Zaire", prompting the Portuguese to lodge an official protest with Mobutu at the end of May.

Emboldened by arms deliveries and commitments of additional support, Roberto ordered his troops to seize the strategic crossroads town of Caxito, which was less than 60 km (37 mi) northeast of Luanda. ELNA drove a FAPLA garrison out of the town on 24 July, where it held a triumphant press conference for the international media. For publicity purposes, it announced that Caxito as well as the highway leading south towards Luanda would be renamed in honour of Roberto. However, within a week ELNA advances south of Caxito had been checked by stiff FAPLA resistance. On 30 August, ELNA resumed its offensive and progressed as far as Quifangondo before being halted again by FAPLA. FAPLA launched a counteroffensive with its conventional 9th Brigade on 4 September, and ELNA began a disorderly retreat, abandoning scores of weapons and crates of ammunition with American markings. FAPLA recaptured Caxito and publicly displayed the captured munitions as proof of CIA collaboration with Roberto. ELNA called in reinforcements, and supported by Zairean paratroopers, recaptured Caxito on 17 September. Between 23 September and 26 September, ELNA succeeded in capturing Morro de Cal, a hill which overlooked the Luanda highway and located only 5 km (3.1 mi) from Quifangondo. A FAPLA attack on Morro de Cal on 23 October was unsuccessful, and on Cuban advice Neto's troops shifted their focus to strengthening their defensive works around Quifangondo. Roberto planned to use Morro de Cal as a springboard for his final assault on Quifangondo, which he delayed to November.

== Opposing forces ==
=== ELNA ===
In January 1975, ELNA was the largest of the three Angolan armies, with 21,000 armed regulars. However, no more than half of ELNA's manpower was actually inside Angola at any one time, since Roberto preferred to keep his most dependable forces in reserve to garrison their external base camps in Zaire. At the beginning of the year there were 9,000 ELNA troops in Angola. In October there were still only about 10,000 ELNA troops in Angola, nearly all of them concentrated in the northern provinces of the territory. They were swelled by a number of new Bakongo recruits enlisted since ELNA's expulsion from Luanda, as well as the 2,000 ex-FAPLA defectors under Daniel Chipenda. Of these troops, most were needed to garrison ELNA's Bakongo heartland, and Roberto was able to muster no more than 3,500 troops for his fall advances on Luanda. The CIA estimated there were 2,500 ELNA personnel in or around Caxito in August 1975. Between 1,000 and 2,000 of these forces were available for Roberto's final November offensive towards Quifangondo, the remainder apparently being held in reserve in Caxito. According to Roberto's own figures, he had 2,000 troops on the offensive along the Caxito-Quifangondo front. These men were for the most part raw, undisciplined, and inexperienced. A sizeable majority were recent recruits enrolled with little training; few had been under hostile fire. Also in the ELNA force were 120 veterans of the Portuguese Army who enlisted under Roberto. The CIA described them as Angolan-born colonials that had fallen on hard times, and often volunteered with ELNA for ideological reasons. The Portuguese contingent was commanded by Colonel Gilberto Manuel Santos e Castro. Colonel Santos e Castro was ELNA's chief of staff and the senior ELNA field commander present at Quifangondo.

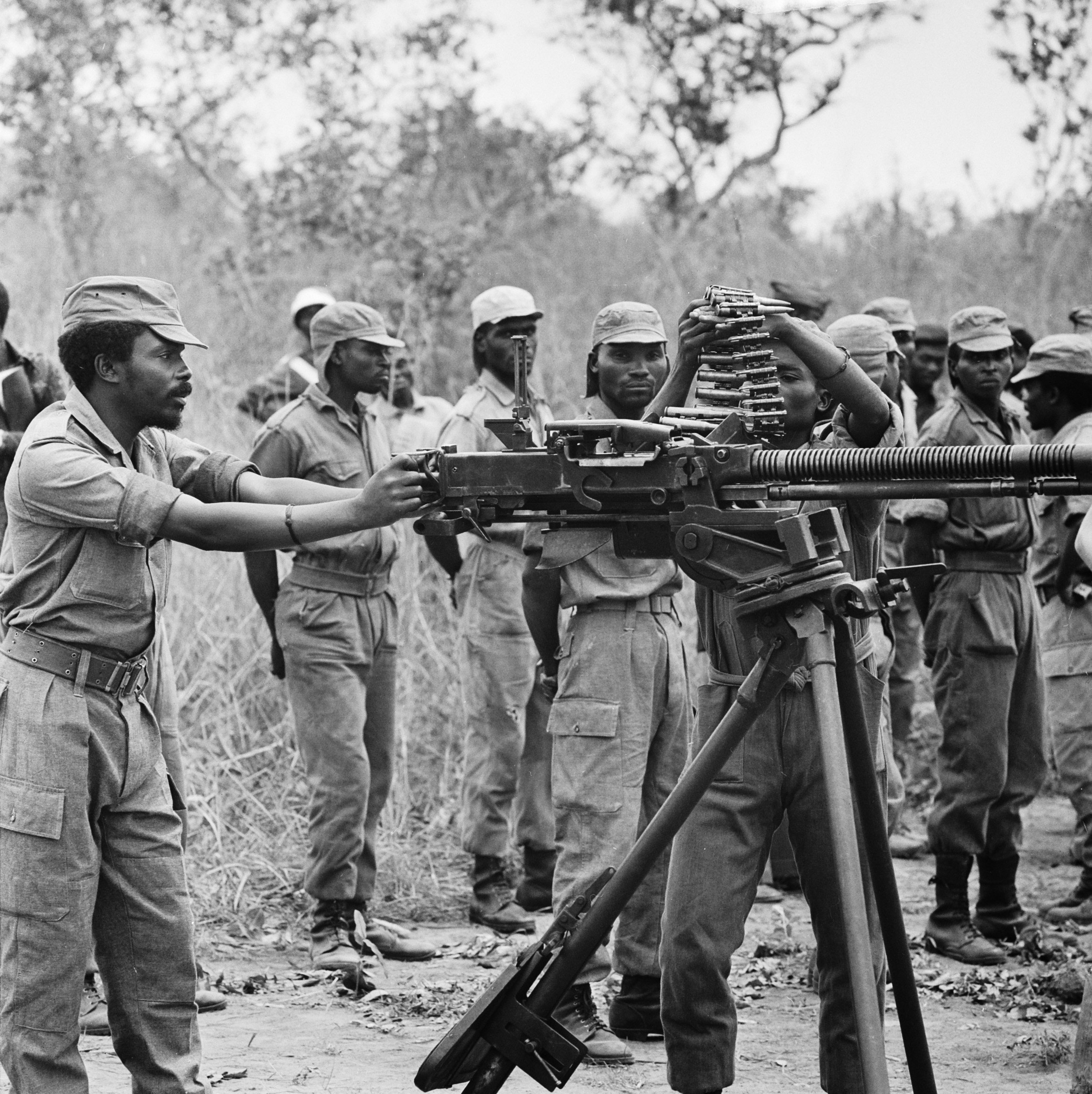
ELNA militants at a training camp in Zaire

Roberto insisted on directing the offensive personally, although he had no prior military experience and often ignored the recommendations of his more experienced South African and Portuguese advisers. ELNA lacked a coherent command structure and its units were inconsistently organised. Furthermore, Roberto's ignorance of logistics hampered ELNA's ability to distribute or maintain the equipment it received from its allies. John Stockwell, a CIA observer sent to evaluate ELNA's capabilities in late 1975, noted that ELNA had received adequate quantities of arms and ammunition, but was "not able to organize the logistical systems necessary to deploy them or to develop the communications, maintenance, combat leadership, and discipline to organize an effective military effort". One of ELNA's primary weaknesses was its failure to encourage technical proficiency, which in turn ensured that most of its recruits were unwilling or unable to familiarise themselves with their weapons. Individual marksmanship and maintenance of personal weapons were quite poor. Peter McAleese, a mercenary attached to Roberto's forces during the civil war, declared that the ELNA troops he inspected "were useless. They had been trained by the Chinese at Kinkusu in Zaire and spent their time learning...slogans rather than training with their weapons, which they hardly fired, even on the range."

ELNA claimed to the press in late August that it possessed tanks, and threatened to use them during future offensives on Luanda. Zaire apparently undertook to supply ELNA with up to 25 Type 59 tanks, but whether Roberto's forces actually received them remains unclear. Only two may have been transferred to ELNA, and they were supplied without crews or tank transporters to move them. The tanks arrived too late to be used in the fighting at Quifangondo. At the beginning of November, the only comparable armour ELNA possessed were nine antiquated Panhard AML-60 and AML-90 armoured cars, all of which were in decrepit condition due to age and poor maintenance. It also had at least one Panhard M3 VTT armoured personnel carrier, likely one of several abandoned in Angola by the withdrawing Portuguese.

The ELNA infantry was equipped with a miscellaneous array of Western and Chinese small arms. The increased flow of foreign material and financial aid beginning in August had done little to improve this situation due to logistics woes and corruption in the Zairean Armed Forces, which had diverted the most modern CIA-supplied weapons bound for ELNA to its own arsenals. The small arms ELNA did receive intact from the CIA and Zaire were all obsolete or approaching obsolescence, and hopelessly outclassed by FAPLA's sophisticated Soviet weaponry. For fire support, ELNA had six 120 mm mortars of American origin. These had been part of a larger arms shipment supplied by the CIA in August, along with 3,430 high-explosive 120 mm projectiles. Aside from the mortars, the ELNA infantry had six M40 recoilless rifles, mounted on jeeps. The shortage of heavy support weapons during Roberto's offensive was always one of his primary concerns, and he repeatedly appealed to his allies for assistance in this regard.

=== Zaire and South Africa ===
Zairean army regulars began infiltrating northern Angola in May, taking advantage of border crossings left unguarded by the Portuguese. On 11 September, possibly with tacit CIA encouragement, Mobutu ordered that paratroops of the 4th and 7th Zairean Commando Battalions be deployed to support the thrust towards Luanda. Both units were immediately airlifted to the ELNA headquarters at Ambriz. They were placed under the collective command of the senior Zairean military officer in Angola, Colonel Manima Lama. ELNA's lack of technical expertise increased the importance of the Zairean personnel, who were expected to operate the few sophisticated heavy weapons Roberto had acquired. The CIA also hoped that the presence of Zairean officers and non-commissioned officers would help bolster ELNA's weak leadership and command structure. At the time of its intervention in Angola, however, the Zairean Armed Forces was being devastated by a series of internal political purges, which probably hindered its ability to assist ELNA further. Morale across the armed forces, even among the elite battalions being deployed to Ambriz, was low. The size of the Zairean military contingent in Angola peaked at 1,200 between May and September 1975. The two paratroop battalions proved instrumental in retaking Caxito from FAPLA on 17 September. At least 700 Zairean paratroopers were selected to help spearhead the final assault on Quifangondo. The remainder were present on the battlefield but likely held in reserve.

The first field artillery support ELNA received was provided by two 130 mm Type 59 field guns delivered by Mobutu's government in early September. These guns were manned by Zairean crews and were of Chinese origin, although Mobutu had sourced them somewhat circuitously from North Korea. (Note: CIA sources suggest that the Type 59s had been loaned to Zaire as part of a North Korean training programme being conducted for that country's armed forces in 1973. Mobutu later terminated the programme but declined to return the guns. The irritated North Korean advisers took the guns' firing tables with them when they departed. Due to the missing firing tables, the gun crews were forced to estimate the amount of propellant to use in their charges, with potentially fatal consequences.) They had an effective range of 32 km (20 mi). The Zairean fire missions were rarely accurate, but had a notable impact on the morale of the FAPLA troops, who lacked comparable long-range artillery at the time. Roberto insisted he needed more artillery to take Luanda. On 8 November, a senior South African artillery officer, Major Jack Bosch, arrived with three BL 5.5-inch Medium Guns. These had an effective range of 19 km (12 mi). Stockwell derided the guns as "obsolete weapons with limited range", noting they were not an improvement on the Zairean artillery already present. Nevertheless, they were the only moderately ranged artillery South Africa was capable of fielding on short notice. The guns were so large and heavy they had to be disassembled prior to being airlifted to Ambriz. Lacking gun tractors, the South African crews commandeered a combination of civilian vehicles and abandoned Portuguese Army trucks to tow them to Morro de Cal. When the Battle of Quifangondo began, there were 20 South African artillerymen of enlisted rank present, excluding their officers and a medical orderly. Including the artillery officers, logistics personnel, and the advisers already attached to ELNA, the total South African military presence on the Caxito-Quifangondo front was about 54 men. Aside from the gun crews, none took any active part in the fighting.

=== FAPLA ===
At the beginning of 1975, FAPLA had between 5,000 and 8,000 men under arms, most of them recent recruits. The Portuguese government estimated that FAPLA had an effective fighting strength of 5,500 armed regulars, although when its irregular formations are taken into account it may have been able to muster a considerably larger force. FAPLA pursued a unique military doctrine which dictated separate and distinct roles for both a regular army and a "people's militia". This was reflective of a particular school of Marxist-Leninist political thought which considered a people's militia to be the most appropriate local defence force under a socialist system. People's militias were to be managed democratically and have no outward distinctions of rank, thus counterbalancing the trend towards the formation of a military caste. By early July, the MPLA had armed thousands of its political supporters from the Luanda slums with Soviet-supplied small arms, organising them into a people's militia which effectively functioned as FAPLA's strategic reserve and played a key role of the expulsion of ELNA from the capital.

FAPLA's regular and irregular units underwent an unprecedented expansion between January and November to combat the continued ELNA threat to Luanda, as well as parallel FALA advances to the south. João Luis Neto "Xiyetu", FAPLA's chief of general staff, authorised a massive recruitment campaign with the objective of doubling troop numbers to 20,000 by November; this would put FAPLA approximately on par with ELNA in terms of manpower. By the end of March, the Soviet Union had supplied FAPLA with enough arms and ammunition to accommodate its doubling in personnel. In April FAPLA recruited 3,000 ex-Katangese veterans of the Congo Crisis, who had been exiled to Angola following a failed secession attempt over a decade earlier. FAPLA recruiters capitalised on their collective hostility towards Mobutu's regime in Zaire to enlist their support against his Angolan ally, Roberto. The recruitment campaign apparently exceeded expectations; FAPLA reached an estimated troop strength of 20,000 around August. These forces were partly concentrated in Luanda and the country's other seaports, namely Lobito, Cabinda, and Moçâmedes, and partly scattered in isolated garrisons across the vast, underdeveloped interior. Like their ELNA counterparts, the FAPLA fighters were mostly inexperienced; they were drawn from the ranks of Luanda's unemployed working class, political activists, and trade unionists, and possessed little instinct in military fieldcraft.

As early as October 1974 the Soviets offered assistance in training and arming up to 2,000 handpicked FAPLA recruits to form the nucleus of a regular FAPLA brigade capable of undertaking conventional military operations. FAPLA considered the Soviets' offer seriously, and even drew up plans for the brigade, which its general staff envisaged as a motorised rapid reaction force ("Brigada de Intervención"). However, Moscow's offer was contingent on FAPLA sending the necessary recruits to the Soviet Union for their training. Neto balked at the suggestion. He insisted that sending his best troops overseas meant they would unavailable in the event of a crisis on the home front. With the civil war raging, FAPLA simply could not spare 2,000 men. In the end, a compromise was reached: only the officers and weapons specialists of the new unit would be sent for training. In March 1975, the first recruits departed for the Soviet Union. Between 20 and 30 officers were instructed at the Vystrel course near Moscow, while another 200 enlisted men received conventional warfare training at a Soviet military base in Perevalnoe, Crimea. In September they returned and mustered into service as part of the newly designated FAPLA 9th Brigade. The Soviet Union armed and equipped the brigade with a shipload of vehicles and heavy weapons delivered to Pointe-Noire in August, which FAPLA had transported to Luanda. After being outfitted, the 9th Brigade was placed under the command of David Moises "Ndozi" and deployed along the Caxito-Quifangondo front on 4 September. Elements of the 9th Brigade formed the core of the FAPLA blocking force between the ELNA offensive and Luanda in November, and Moises was the senior FAPLA field commander present at Quifangondo.

Not all of the 9th Brigade was deployed at Quifangondo; the unit, already understrength, was depleted further when some of the returnees from the Soviet Union were diverted south to fight FALA. The FAPLA position at Quifangondo was also undermined by the departure of 200 ex-Katangese troops, who were present until late October, when they were also diverted south to check a FALA offensive on Benguela. The reduced FAPLA garrison, approximately 850 to just over 1,000 strong, was deemed capable of holding Quifangondo against Roberto's army for the immediate future. Aside from the members of the 9th Brigade, who were generally trained well to use their weapons, the bulk of the FAPLA garrison was made of new recruits evacuated from a training camp in Vila Salazar. In late October, FAPLA had closed the camp and abandoned Vila Salazar to refocus on defending Luanda. The Vila Salazar recruits were hastily thrown into battle during the unsuccessful attack on Morro do Cal, and had been driven back to Quifangondo by a combined ELNA-Zairean force along with the other FAPLA troops.

The FAPLA infantry was, for the most part, equipped with various Kalashnikov-pattern automatic rifles of Soviet bloc origin, although older Czechoslovak vz. 52 rifles, donated by Cuba from its reserve stocks, were commonly used as well. The vz. 52s had been delivered for the express purpose of arming the battalions raised in a select few training camps, including Vila Salazar, and were carried by the recruits previously enrolled there. In heavy support weapons FAPLA was generally superior to its opponents. It possessed large quantities of RPG-7s, also supplied by Cuba, 82 mm mortars, and B-10 recoilless rifles. The only heavy armour Neto's forces possessed for most of 1975 were 12 T-34-85 medium tanks of World War II vintage donated by Yugoslavia. The tanks were reportedly used to drive ELNA out of Luanda in July. References to these tanks began appearing in FALA and South African reports in September. That same month, the Soviet Union donated another 10 T-34-85s to FAPLA, promising to have them delivered to Luanda before 10 November. While not very formidable from a conventional standpoint, the presence of the archaic T-34-85s was a decisive factor, since ELNA had no tanks of its own to counter them. As Roberto's troops neared Luanda in early November, the tanks were dug into the hills east of the capital, but could be mobilised quickly if ELNA overran the defensive works at Quifangondo.

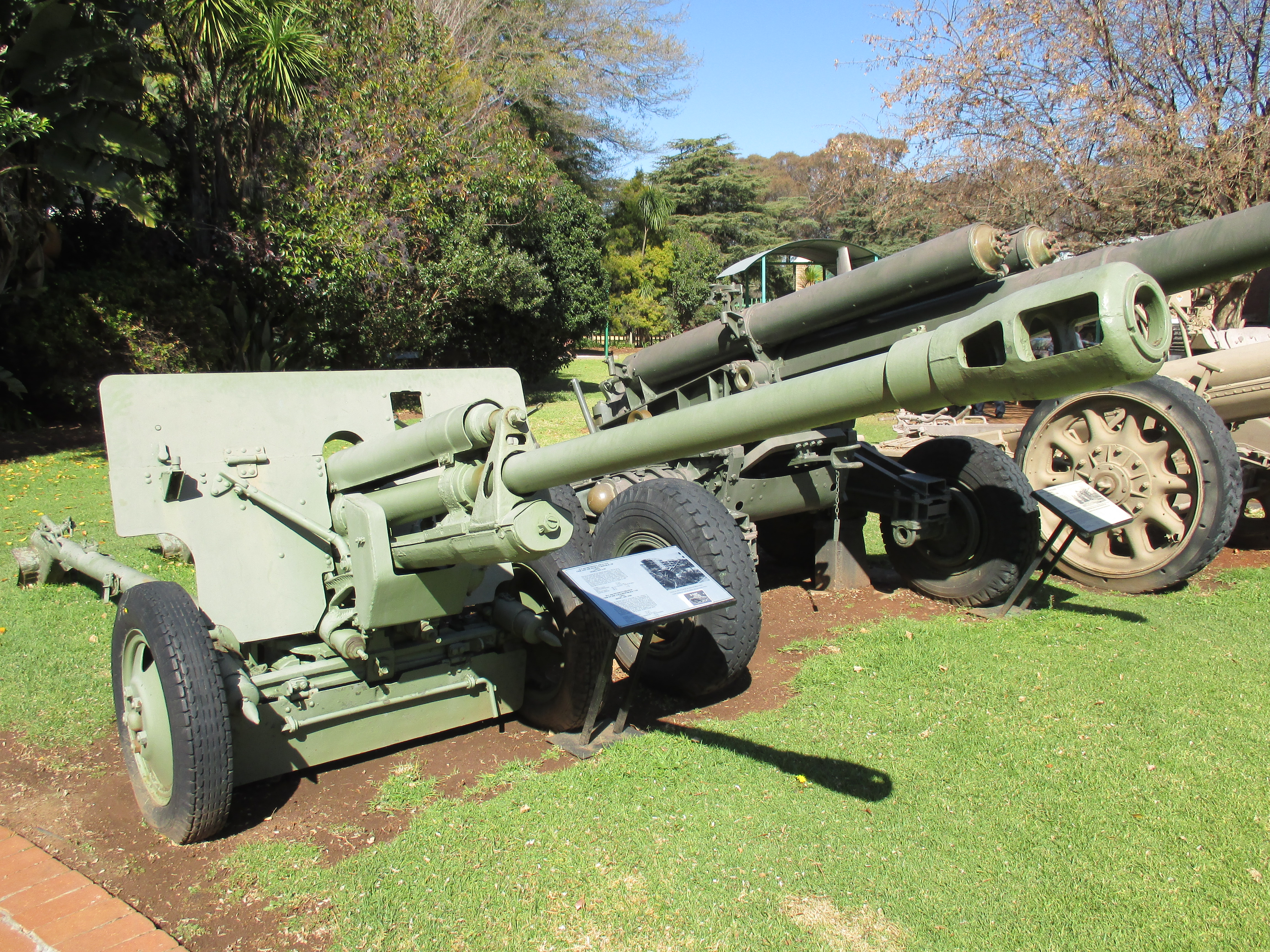
FAPLA ZIS-3 76 mm divisional gun at the South African National Museum of Military History

The garrison at Quifangondo was well-equipped with artillery and heavy support weapons. It included the 9th Brigade's integral artillery battery under the command of Roberto Leal Ramos Monteiro "Ngongo", with 12 76 mm ZiS-3 divisional guns. The ZiS-3 had an effective range of 13 km (8.1 mi). While extremely versatile as infantry support weapons, the divisional guns were considered inadequate to repel a determined assault by attackers with artillery support of their own, and in September the Soviets agreed to supply FAPLA with BM-21 Grad truck-mounted multiple rocket launchers. The BM-21 had a range of 20 km (12 mi) and could fire salvoes of 40 122mm rockets at a time. At the beginning of November, the first two BM-21s were flown into Point-Noire by Soviet pilots over the objections of Neto and his staff, who wanted them airlifted directly to Luanda. Within a few days, a total of six BM-21s had been delivered and stockpiled at Point-Noire. There, they were reassembled by Cuban technicians and transported by ship to Luanda, arriving on 7 November. The rocket launchers were supplied with ample ammunition; however, the Soviets had neglected to include the necessary fuses. This rendered them impotent until the evening of 9 November, when fuses were finally flown in from Cuba.

Whether any of the BM-21s were deployed to Quifangondo after 7 November is a matter of dispute. Western and South African sources nearly all reported their presence at Quifangondo during the battle on 10 November. CIA observers attached to Roberto's staff present during the engagement also claimed they were there. However, Monteiro was adamant that his battery at Quifangondo did not include any BM-21s, only six-man-portable, single-tube Grad-Ps, which utilised the same ammunition but were not capable of firing multiple projectiles in salvo. FAPLA sources do not generally acknowledge the combat deployment of the BM-21 until the 9th Brigade's final offensive on Caxito later in the month. One Soviet source suggests the BM-21s were not deployed along the frontlines at Quifangondo, but to the rear, alongside the reserves. British historian Alexander Hill wrote that Monteiro's Grad-Ps were deployed to Quifangondo on 7 November, and were already there by the time the six BM-21s arrived on 10 November. Hill maintains that the two weapon types were sometimes confused in accounts of the battle, but both were present in the FAPLA lines.

=== Cuba ===
At Neto's request a large Cuban military mission deployed to Angola in October: some 500 officers and men under Raúl Díaz Argüelles, former head of the Décima Dirección, a directorate which coordinated all Cuban military operations overseas. From September onward, these advisers instructed FAPLA in conventional warfare at training camps in Henrique de Carvalho, Benguela, Vila Salazar, and Cabinda. Their objective was to train, arm, and equip 4,800 FAPLA recruits for 16 new infantry battalions, 25 mortar companies, and an air defence corps. Cuban armour crews and artillerymen were also deployed to operate FAPLA's more sophisticated hardware, namely its tanks and heavy artillery, until adequate numbers of FAPLA recruits could be trained to replace them. A detail of 20 of Cuba's most experienced artillery specialists was formed specifically to service and operate the six BM-21s. On 19 October, Argüelles drew up a defence plan for Luanda and ordered the training centre at Vila Salazar evacuated so he could shift most of the men there to Quifangondo. At this time, 58 Cuban personnel were stationed at Quifangondo, including 40 instructors from Vila Salazar. A battalion of internal troops from the Cuban Ministry of Interior was appointed as the general reserve on its arrival in Luanda around 8 November. It would form the second line of defence at Quifangondo. The BM-21s, manned by the 20 Cuban artillery specialists, may have been located near their position, possibly 6 km (3.7 mi) to the rear. By November 10 there were at least 88 Cubans in the first line of defence, including the training instructors from Vila Salazar; following Cuban military tradition, they were expected to fight alongside their students. Argüelles was so short of men that he ordered a Cuban mortar company and some anti-aircraft specialists redeployed from Cabinda to join the defenders at Quifangondo. These troops were equipped with ZPU-4 anti-aircraft guns, which were deployed at ground level as heavy machine guns.

=== Alleged Soviet presence ===
There were a number of initial reports that Soviet military advisers were present among the FAPLA defenders at Quifangondo. Hill disputes this in his summary of the engagement, claiming that "not a single Soviet adviser seems to have been involved in the fighting at Quifangondo." According to Hill, the first Soviet military advisers did not arrive in Angola until 16 November, well after the battle was over. Piero Gleijeses wrote that there was a single Soviet adviser attached to the 9th Brigade, a colonel who had been in Angola since September. Gleijeses claimed the colonel was an artillery specialist who advised Monteiro directly and was present in the FAPLA lines on 10 November. Russian historians Vladimir and Gennady Shubin later identified this officer as Colonel Yuri Mitin, but asserted that he did not arrive in Angola until 16 November, along with the rest of the Soviet military group.

== Tactical considerations ==
Quifangondo was a small village in northern Luanda Province, some 30 km (19 mi) from downtown Luanda. Prior to the civil war, the settlement was primarily known for being the location of a reservoir which supplied water to Luanda. Its defence had assumed increasing importance in FAPLA command circles early in the fighting, when damage to the Dondo hydroelectric complex to the east made the capital even more dependent on the Quifangondo waterworks. American historian Daniel Spikes wrote that if ELNA succeeding in capturing the waterworks, "Roberto would control the spigot through which Luanda's water supply flowed." If the pump station at Quifangondo was shut down, that would leave the FAPLA forces and civilian population inside Luanda with no more than a few days' worth of fresh water remaining.

The hills around Quifangondo dominated the northern approaches to Luanda, overlooking the highway towards Funda in the east and Caxito to the north. The section of highway leading northwards to Caxito was bounded to the west by the Atlantic Ocean and to the east, by impassable swampland. Movement off the road was generally difficult for wheeled vehicles. Just outside Quifangondo, the swampland gave way to a body of water known as Panguila Lake. To reach Luanda from this direction, an attacking column would have to cross an elevated section of highway over Panguila Lake and a conventional bridge over the Bengo River. FAPLA sappers had attempted to destroy the elevated highway and the Bengo River bridge with explosive charges, but were unsuccessful. On 7 November, an ELNA reconnaissance group determined that both the highway and the bridge were intact.

Roberto's capture of Caxito in late July left Quifangondo and much of northern Luanda Province open to an invasion by ELNA forces. In October, when ELNA troops began encroaching on the capital, Quifangondo became even more vulnerable, partly due to its proximity to Morro de Cal. Cuban combat engineers supervised the construction of scaled defences around Quifangondo, including underground bunkers to provide some measure of protection from ELNA's artillery bombardments. Argüelles's plan for the defence of Luanda was to use the garrison at Quifangondo to underpin the extremity of his western flank, while other Cuban and FAPLA units assembled into a series of hastily conceived defensive lines which extended from Quifangondo to Funda, and from Funda to Cacuaco. Additional Cuban troops were held in reserve in the Grafanil district, where several FAPLA arms depots were located.

ELNA forces first probed Quifangondo on 30 August. After the unsuccessful FAPLA assault on Morro de Cal on 23 October, ELNA pursued the withdrawing FAPLA and Cuban troops to Quifangondo, but was unable to follow up on its advantage and take the settlement. On 5 November, ELNA infantry accompanied by armoured cars carried out another probing action to test the strength of the defences. As soon as the vehicles were within range, they came under heavy fire from the rockets and divisional guns of the 9th Brigade, forcing the ELNA troops to withdraw. On 8 November, ELNA and Zairean troops made a second attempt to approach the village, but were again subject to withering artillery fire and forced to abandon their advance. These experiences had the effect of persuading Roberto he needed more guns of his own to suppress the FAPLA battery. South Africa's subsequent delivery of three medium guns and promises of air support, via a squadron of English Electric Canberra bombers, encouraged Roberto to launch his final assault, which was scheduled for 10 November.

Brigadier Ben Roos, the senior South African field officer present, soon had an opportunity to assess the enemy and the imposing hills around Quifangondo. He found the FAPLA line at Quifangondo to be a formidable defensive position indeed, and noted the presence of FAPLA guns and rocket artillery covering the ground with infantry in strength. Roos argued that an assault on this position would be "tantamount to suicide".

The more Roos reported his observations, the clearer it became to his superiors that attack might be futile. General Constand Viljoen, South Africa's director of army operations, had visited Roberto and his staff at Ambriz a few days earlier and spent some time studying the terrain before them. He was accompanied by General Magnus Malan, who was the chief of the South African Army at the time. Viljoen and Roos, who believed ELNA was woefully inadequate as a conventional fighting force, argued that Roberto should wage a defensive campaign if possible. They recommended that Roberto retire north to some defensive position between Caxito and Ambriz, strengthening his grip on the countryside around Luanda. Roberto's CIA benefactors were equally apprehensive, and endorsed a withdrawal from the Quifangondo front in favour of a broad encircling movement from the east. Roberto rejected their counsel. This was his last chance to destroy FAPLA before Angolan independence was bestowed; furthermore, he thought it desirable to strike before FAPLA was further strengthened by its Cuban and Soviet allies. Spikes commented that "for weeks, South African and American advisers to the FNLA had counseled Roberto to follow the same strategy as Savimbi – that at all costs he...retain his territory and not launch an offensive against Luanda." But Roberto could not be dissuaded, having decided to "make his historic attack on Luanda the inevitable end game of the war."

The South Africans reluctantly resigned themselves to supporting the attack, gambling on the likelihood that if their guns could drive the defenders underground into their bunkers, then an immediate and well-coordinated infantry assault might break through.

António França "N'Dalu", a FAPLA officer at Quifangondo who later served as Angolan Minister of Defence, commented:

[ELNA]'s problem was 11 November. If they tried taking Luanda from the other more easterly road, which would have been viable militarily, it would have taken them from two to three months: Kifangondo looked the best way but it meant they had to enter a corridor of five hundred metres where the road forms a straight dyke through the marshes, and where they could not disperse their troops. This is where we had the advantage: we were on the heights. They seem to have banked on getting through somehow to Kifangondo and the Luanda water pumping station, cutting off Luanda's water supply and forcing our surrender.

Colonel e Castro, who supported a direct frontal assault on Quifangondo, was responsible for most of the operational planning for the attack. The previously cautious use of the FAPLA guns caused him to vastly underestimate the strength of the garrison's artillery, and dismiss it as a decisive factor. However, some of the other Portuguese volunteers were more skeptical. The dissenters insisted that Roberto should consider a flanking movement through the swamps as his main avenue of approach. Alternatively, flanking attacks could be made through the swamps to support the main advance along the highway. This option had already been discussed between Roberto and his South African advisers and rejected for several reasons: the swampy terrain east of the highway was impassable to the wheeled vehicles, possessed inadequate cover to bestow an advantage in concealment, and the ELNA infantry had flatly refused to cross it on foot, citing the hazard posed by crocodiles and venomous snakes.

== Battle ==
=== South African artillery and air bombardment ===
On the evening of 9 November, the South African and Zairean artillery on Morro de Cal began firing. For several hours they fired on Quifangondo and beyond the defenders' lines, towards Luanda. Several shells landed near the Luanda refinery. Others appear to have been targeting the FAPLA facilities in the Grafanil district. The bombardment killed a civilian in Grafanil, but did not cause any FAPLA or Cuban casualties. The FAPLA guns did not respond, leading some of the ELNA troops to erroneously conclude that the Quifangondo defences had been abandoned.

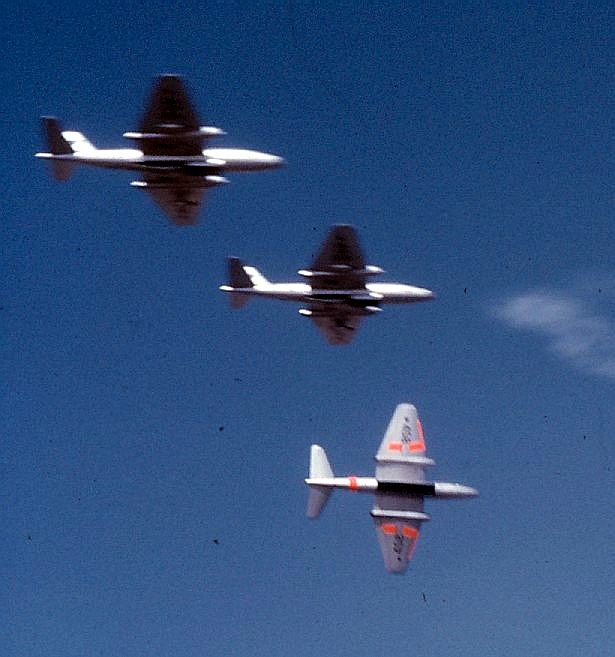
Three South African English Electric Canberra bombers flying in close formation, early 1970s

At 5:40 a.m. Major Bosch ordered ranging shots be fired at the Quifangondo waterworks and the bridge spanning the Bengo River. For nineteen minutes afterwards, his guns fired airburst shells over the FAPLA lines. Bosch ceased fire at 5:59 a.m. to await the anticipated air strike, which occurred on schedule. Three Canberra bomber aircraft launched from the South African Air Force base at Rundu appeared presently and initiated a bombing run over the FAPLA lines. Anxious to maintain plausible deniability, the South African government had ordered the Canberra pilots to fly at such high altitudes they could not identify their targets. Only four of the Canberras' nine bombs were dropped, and none struck the defenders. After making this single unsuccessful pass, the aircraft returned to Rundu.

Roos and Bosch observed that the morning's artillery bombardment and the follow-up strike by the Canberras had at least achieved the desirable psychological effect: they noticed the FAPLA troops on the other side of the Bengo River moving to the rear. Any advantage would be lost unless the ELNA infantry immediately started forward. Much to their frustration, this did not occur as the ELNA commanders were waiting on Roberto, who had insisted on witnessing the attack in person. Roberto was taking his breakfast, and his leisurely pace in reaching the front delayed the ELNA advance by almost forty minutes. To complicate matters further, not all the ELNA infantry sections were in position and not all their commanders had been briefed on the details of the attack. Some had overslept. This caused further delays as the senior ELNA staff held an order group to detail the attack for the field commanders. Meanwhile, all the FAPLA defenders had returned to their fighting positions.

=== ELNA assault ===
At 7:40 a.m. Roberto's force began their advance. ELNA's nine Panhard AML-60 and AML-90 armoured cars manned by the Portuguese volunteers emerged from the cover of the palm groves north of Quifangondo and started down the open highway towards the village. They were trailed by more ELNA fighters riding in six jeeps and manning 106 mm recoilless rifles. The rest of the assault group was trucked as far as Morro de Cal, then dismounted and followed the vehicles on foot. Despite the morning's delays, morale was high, as the attackers had been able to see their ultimate objective—Luanda—from Morro de Cal. At this point there were about 600 regular ELNA infantry and 700 Zairean paratroops on the road. Roberto's remaining troops were held near Morro de Cal in reserve. Spikes writes that while on previous forays, ELNA "had advanced cautiously; [on November 10], however, confident they faced an enemy already broken by...constant bombardment, Roberto's army swept down from Morro de Cal, squeezed onto the road and sped forward." There was no attempt to disperse the infantry or the vehicles.

The ELNA column was soon within range of the artillery battery of the FAPLA 9th Brigade, but the defenders were under strict orders to hold their fire until the entire attacking force was enclosed within a predetermined kill zone between the lagoon and the shoreline from east to west, or when the vehicles had reached the section of elevated highway over Panguila Lake. Monteiro "Ngongo" had positioned his six Grad-P rocket launchers over the crest of a hill to protect them from South African and Zairean counter-battery action, but he and a second officer were posted within view of the highway to direct their fire.

When most of the attackers were on the highway spanning Panguila Lake and the AML armoured cars had begun to approach the Bengo River, the defenders opened fire. Monteiro apparently gave the order when the FAPLA trenches came under fire from the lead AML-90's co-axial machine gun. Monteiro's battery of ZiS-3 divisional guns, working in concert with FAPLA infantry armed with B-10 recoilless rifles, immediately knocked out the three trailing AMLs. The wrecked armoured cars trapped the others at the lead of the column, cutting off their only avenue of retreat. The leading AML-90 and two AML-60s soon identified the FAPLA guns and manoeuvred into position to lay down suppressing fire. A FAPLA artilleryman was wounded by shrapnel from a high explosive shell fired by one of the armoured cars, but otherwise there were no casualties; the gun crews were well-protected by their defensive works. Both the ZiS-3 and armoured car crews were forced to make estimations and corrections with primitive sighting equipment, resulting in a tense exchange of fire at extremely close range before the AMLs were finally knocked out. In quick succession, the FAPLA guns and recoilless rifles also destroyed all six of the unarmoured jeeps. In their role as ground support weapons, the Cuban anti-aircraft guns proved extremely effective, preventing the ELNA and Zairean infantry from advancing to support the vehicles. Spikes observed that "having brazenly rushed the riverbanks," the ELNA vehicles were left unsupported on the flat road and "exposed to the full brunt of the enemy's fire."

Monteiro's Grad-Ps fired a few speculatory rockets at the South African and Zairean artillery positions, but their crews concluded they lacked the range to engage the larger guns effectively. According to Vladimir and Gennady Shubin, "initially their task was to silence the enemy's heavy artillery. They fired on enemy positions, but without success...the range of those portable man-handled rocket launchers was far less than that of the South African and Zairean artillery." Thereafter the FAPLA Grad-Ps began firing rockets into the exposed ELNA and Zairean infantry. Many of the ELNA troops broke and fled after the first rocket salvo. Others sought cover in the swampy terrain adjacent to the road. At length the defenders also began to shell the demoralised infantry column with mortars. The confines of the highway offered FAPLA the opportunity to focus all its fire along the relatively narrow axis of ELNA's advance.

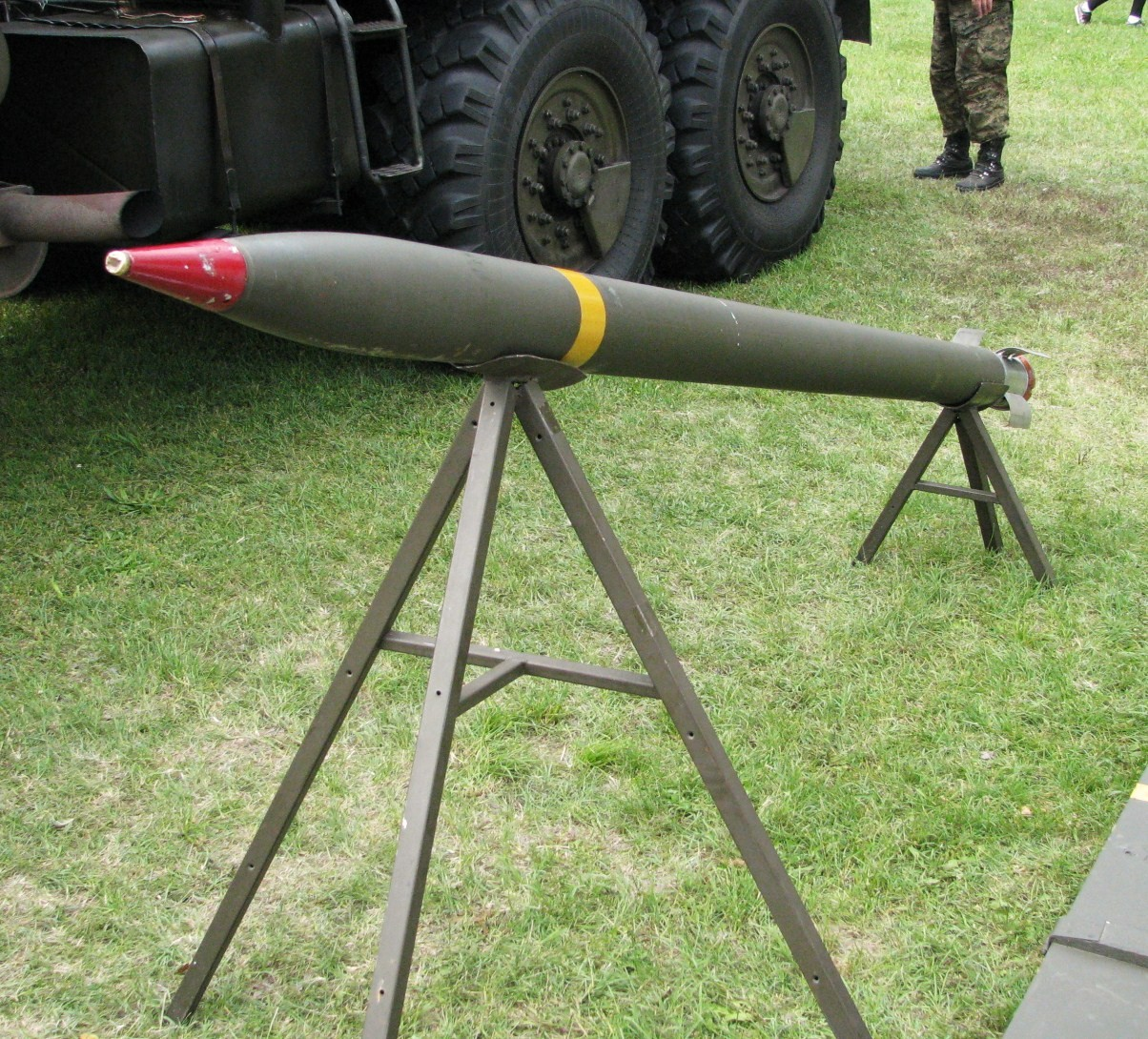
122mm rocket fired from the Grad-P and BM-21

Roberto ordered the deployment of his six CIA-supplied 120 mm mortars, but when they were brought to the front their firing pins were inexplicably missing. (Note: The missing firing pins became a major source of contention after the battle. South African war journalist Al J Venter noted that the mortars were provided without other necessities, such as instruction handbooks, sighting equipment, or range tables, and none of the ELNA troops or Portuguese volunteers knew how to operate them. Venter pointed out that there were also similar problems with the 106 mm recoilless rifles, and that the CIA claimed that these auxiliary materials had indeed been provided through their suppliers, only to disappear once the weapons were delivered to Angola—possibly due to theft or poor inventory management.) Meanwhile, the South African and Zairean guns began to engage in an artillery duel with Monteiro's battery. Security for the guns was supposed to be provided by a line of ELNA troops forward of their emplacements, but these fled when the first rockets landed near their positions. One of the Zairean field guns experienced a catastrophic explosion in its breech upon attempting to fire its first round. The gun had been double loaded with propellant by its inexperienced crew, all of whom died in the blast. The second Zairean field gun was later disabled by a misfire, which injured its crew. The South African guns remained operational, but they lacked the range to neutralise the Grad-Ps and could not match their rate of fire. A member of one artillery crew was wounded by a shell fragment; he was the only South African casualty at Quifangondo.

Accounts on the volume of FAPLA artillery fire and the degree to which Cuban BM-21s may have participated in the battle remain contradictory. John Stockwell estimated that "two thousand rockets rained on the task force as it broke and fled in panic." Stockwell also claimed that truck-mounted BM-21s played an active role during the battle at Quifangondo, enabling their crews to quickly displace whenever they came under counter-battery fire from the South African guns. Monteiro was adamant that the only rocket artillery which took part in the fighting were his six Grad-Ps, and estimated that he only fired ten salvoes of six rockets each at the attackers. António França, who was also present in the FAPLA lines, contradicts this by claiming a single Cuban BM-21 fired the first opening salvo.

Within the first hour of the battle, FAPLA had destroyed virtually all of ELNA's vehicles and inflicted serious casualties on the assault group. The surviving infantry withdrew in disarray to an abandoned chicken farm near Morro de Cal, where Roberto reinforced them with his reserves. Attempts to reconstitute the assault group at the farm were severely hampered by two salvoes of enemy rocket fire which struck the site and inflicted heavy casualties on the ELNA troops massing for a second attack. Russian historian Serguei Kolomnin commented that this fire could have only come from the Cuban BM-21s behind the FAPLA lines, as the Grad-Ps lacked the range to reach that far. Cuban accounts confirm that the BM-21s were used to shell known ELNA positions near Morro de Cal after the failure of the initial assault.

By 11:00 a.m. the ELNA reserves had begun a disorderly route. Roos, who had watched the attack stall and disintegrate from his position on Morro de Cal, ordered Bosch to withdraw with his guns to a position north of the Dondo River. The South African artillery crews worked frantically through the night to extricate the guns, reaching the Dondo River amid a backwash of wounded and demoralised stragglers from broken ELNA units. The Zairean paratroops also joined in the general withdrawal northwards, but regrouped at the Dondo River, where Colonel Lama tried to rally the survivors against the counterattack he expected from FAPLA. The remnants of Colonel e Castro's Portuguese volunteers regrouped separately, a short distance northeast of Morro de Cal.

FAPLA did not press its advantage, and only followed ELNA's retreat with caution weeks after the battle. In the words of South African historian Willem Steenkamp, "the Cubans and FAPLA missed a marvelous opportunity to deal the FNLA a major knockout blow: a reasonably strong mechanised force could have taken full advantage of the general confusion and panic to thrust all the way to Ambriz."

== Aftermath ==
=== Casualties ===
Official ELNA and Zairean military casualties were between 100 and 150 dead, and around 200 wounded. Roberto stated that ELNA alone had suffered 120 confirmed dead, and estimated the total number of wounded as probably being double that. According to American military analyst Spencer C. Tucker, an accurate count would have the number of ELNA and Zairean dead running into the multiple hundreds. Alexander Hill wrote that "most sources commenting on ELNA losses suggest that several hundred ELNA troops were lost during the fighting at Quifangondo, excluding any losses among [the Zaireans] that certainly included a number of artillerymen." Citing unnamed sources in the FNLA, Cuban journalist Hedelberto Lopez Blanch stated that ELNA suffered at least 345 dead.

South Africa suffered one wounded. Five Portuguese volunteers died. Three of the volunteers were also taken prisoner by FAPLA.

ELNA lost the majority of its vehicles at Quifangondo, including all six jeep-mounted recoilless rifles and at least four armoured cars. Both Zairean field guns were destroyed or rendered inoperable, and abandoned on the battlefield; the surviving crew was evacuated to Ambriz. After the battle, a Zairean soldier was found alive in a wrecked armoured car and taken prisoner by FAPLA.

FAPLA suffered one dead—a recruit who had disobeyed orders and left his trench when the fighting started; he was killed by ELNA machine gun fire. An additional three FAPLA personnel were wounded. Cuba suffered two wounded.

=== Political and military impact ===
The Battle of Quifangondo had enormous strategic implications for the course of the Angolan Civil War. It dashed Roberto's hopes of capturing Luanda before Angola's independence date, and all but assured Neto's continued grip on the Angolan capital. At 6:00 p.m. that day the Portuguese high commissioner, Leonel Alexandre Gomes Cardoso, announced that Portugal was transferring sovereignty of its colony to "the Angolan people" and departed Luanda by sea. He was followed shortly thereafter by the last of the Portuguese military personnel. At midnight, Neto proclaimed the establishment of the People's Republic of Angola. The new state was immediately recognised by 30 nations, including the Soviet Union, Brazil, and Cuba. In response, Roberto and his UNITA counterpart Savimbi proclaimed the Democratic People's Republic of Angola, which was not recognised by any country, even their traditional allies Zaire and South Africa. Hill wrote that "The fighting at Quifangondo...proved to be crucial in allowing the MPLA to consolidate its hold on power in the northern regions of Angola and legitimate its formation of a government for the newly independent country by maintaining control of the capital at the crucial moment of independence."

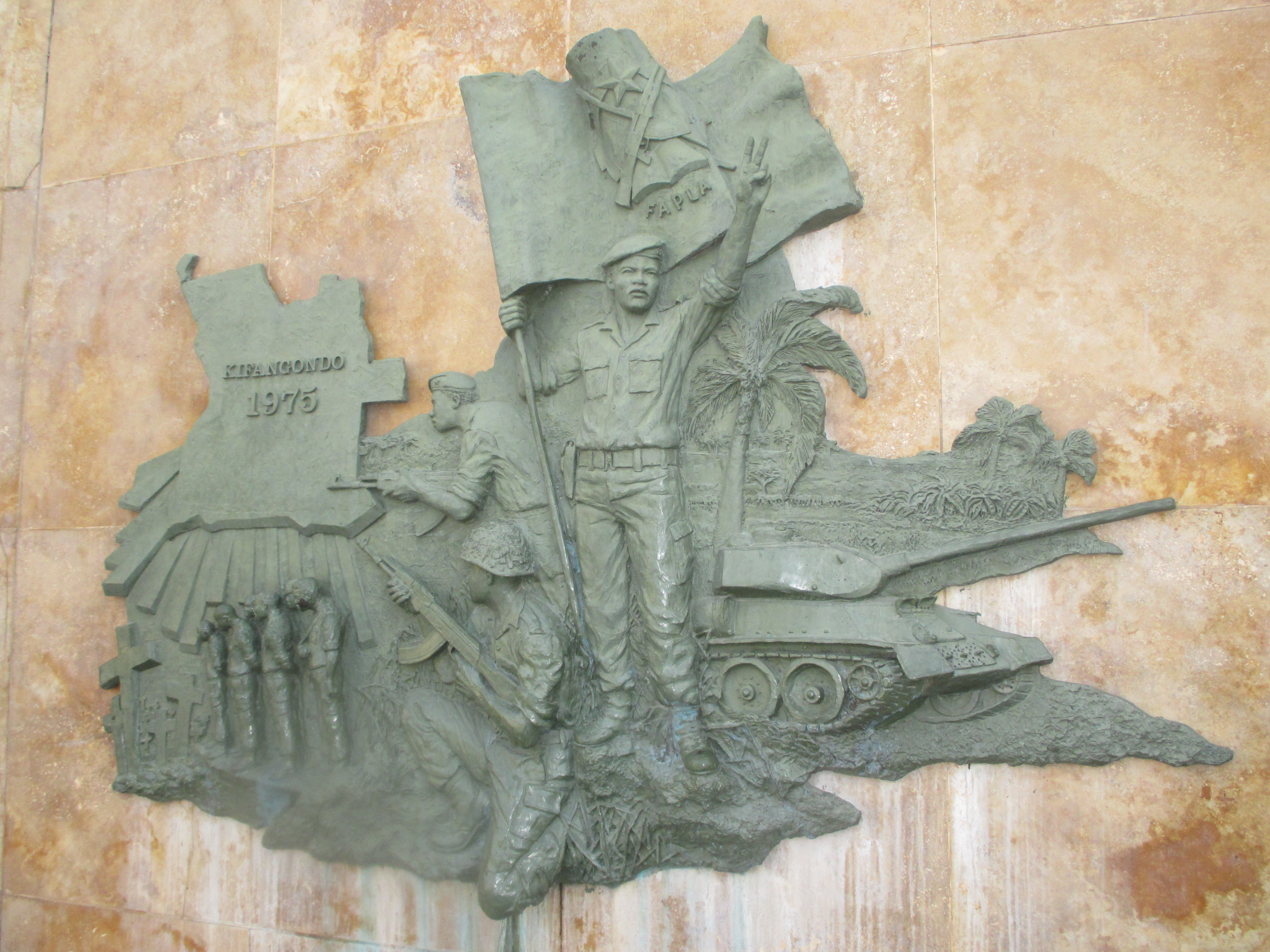
Modern relief at Quifangondo commemorating the FAPLA victory.

Among Roberto's supporters, the psychological repercussions of his failure far exceeded the losses of men and materiel. As exaggerated accounts of the defeat spread through ELNA's ranks, discipline rapidly collapsed and sabotaged Roberto's attempts at consolidating his forces. Thousands of Roberto's soldiers did not withdraw towards Ambriz with their leader. Roberto had lost all but two companies—almost his entire army—along the Caxito-Ambriz front by 24 November. His foreign allies gradually evaporated, too. In the aftermath of the battle, Colonel Lama lost almost two-thirds of his command due to desertion. Similarly, Colonel e Castro was only able to muster 26 of his original Portuguese volunteers on 11 November. Brigadier Roos gave Roberto some parting advice on fighting delaying actions and arranged to have his logistics staff and artillery crews evacuated from Ambriz by a South African Navy frigate, the SAS President Steyn. On 17 November, the frigate's crew used a helicopter and several inflatable boats to extract all South African personnel from the Ambriz shoreline. The 5.5-inch medium guns were initially towed to Zaire to prevent them from falling into FAPLA's hands. All were returned to South Africa by plane shortly afterwards.

There was no pursuit and no engagement of troops [or] units by the MPLA, but for the FNLA and Zairians [sic] the war was virtually over. Thereafter whenever the MPLA/Cuban force got close enough to lob a few 122 mm rockets into their ranks, a panicky retreat took place to the next town or port...by the second week after Quifangondo they were a demoralized, undisciplined rabble, out of control of their officers.

— John Stockwell, on the state of Roberto's forces in late November.

In his book The Cuban Intervention in Angola, Edward George wrote that "it is no exaggeration to say that the battle of Quifangondo destroyed the FNLA, even if fighting between them and the FAPLA–Cubans was to continue for another four months." Political scientist and noted Angola scholar W. Martin James asserted that after Quifangondo, ELNA "was no longer a legitimate military force." Tonta Afonso Castro, a member of the ELNA general staff, later commented that the morale of the FNLA's political wing had been just as badly shaken: "we retreated [from Quifangondo]. However, in this defeat, the political party became much more defeated than the soldiers who were on the ground." John Marcum observed in his works that the FNLA's lack of a coherent political ideology probably worsened the psychological impact of the defeat, which was widely attributed to Roberto's poor decisions. Lacking political indoctrination aside from their loyalty to Roberto, ELNA troops became thoroughly demoralised by his apparent military blunder and lost the will to continue the war.

The FAPLA victory at Quifangondo also had political repercussions for Roberto's ally, Mobutu Sese Seko. In their analysis of the battle and its aftermath, historians Erik Kennes and Miles Larmer found:

this humiliating defeat was not simply a military blow for Mobutu; the exposure of his tacit alliance with US and South African forces was a devastating and permanent blow to any pretensions he had to pan-African leadership. It revealed the weakness of his armed forces and strengthened the hopes of his opponents, both inside and outside Zaire, that he could be defeated.

Many of the Zairean deserters at large in Angola defected to the Katangese troops fighting with FAPLA, and were eventually enlisted into the Congolese National Liberation Front (FNLC).

On 5 December, FAPLA launched a major counteroffensive northwards, recapturing Caxito. The capture of Caxito was ensured by a successful Cuban amphibious landing at Barra do Dande amid heavy bombardment from the BM-21s. Roberto had little alternative but to abandon Ambriz and flee towards the Zairean border. The last Zairean paratroops withdrew from northern Angola around that time. Stockwell caustically wrote of the undisciplined Zairean withdrawal: "Mobutu's finest...vented their frustration on the villages and towns in the path of their flight, in a tidal wave of terrorism, rape, and pillage, until the Kongo tribesmen of northern Angola prayed for the early arrival of the MPLA and Cuban liberators." The New York Times reported that both ELNA and Zairean forces "pillaged the towns to which they withdrew...the Zaire army units were said to be most active in the looting." Continued logistical woes further undermined Roberto's efforts to fight a defensive campaign; with the loss of Ambriz, the remaining ELNA forces were dependent on rations flown by chartered aircraft to two airstrips near the Zairean border, and these often failed to reach the front in time. Journalists Michael Wolfers and Jane Bergerol noted that the looting was probably partly driven by the shortage of rations, as "the rank and file were left to fend for themselves". Meanwhile, Roberto's criticism of the Zairean soldiers' sacking of Angolan towns caused his relationship with Mobutu to deteriorate, and Zaire promptly ceased its remaining support for ELNA.

Deprived of its final ally, ELNA was no match for the combined FAPLA and Cuban armies, and from January 1976 onwards the war in northern Angola became virtually one-sided, with FAPLA advancing rapidly towards the Zairean border against sporadic local resistance. On January 4, Carmona, site of the FNLA's political headquarters, was captured "with hardly a shot fired". Whatever remained of ELNA's conventional military force had disintegrated, and with the fall of Carmona the CIA questioned "whether Roberto any longer commanded an army in the field." FAPLA forces entered the last settlement under ELNA control, the village of Noqui, on March 6.

With most of his traditional areas of support under FAPLA occupation, and the final collapse of ELNA as a fighting force, Roberto's bid for political power in Angola was over. He fled into exile in Zaire in February 1976. South of Luanda, the fighting continued for decades between FAPLA and FALA until the latter was defeated in 2002, ending the civil war.

== Notes and citations ==
Notes

Citations
