= 2nd Secretariat of the Communist Party of Cuba =

The 2nd Secretariat of the Communist Party of Cuba (PCC) was elected in 1980 by the 1st Plenary Session of the 2nd Central Committee in the immediate aftermath of the 2nd Congress.

== Officers ==
| Title | Name | Birth | Gender |
|---|---|---|---|
| First Secretary of the Central Committee of the Communist Party of Cuba | Fidel Alejandro Castro Ruz | 1926 | Male |
| Second Secretary of the Central Committee of the Communist Party of Cuba | Raúl Modesto Castro Ruz | 1931 | Male |

== Members ==
| Rank | Name | 1st SEC | 3rd SEC | Birth | Death | Gender |
|---|---|---|---|---|---|---|
| 1 | Fidel Alejandro Castro Ruz | Old | Reelected | 1926 | 2016 | Male |
| 2 | Raúl Modesto Castro Ruz | Old | Reelected | 1931 | — | Male |
| 3 | Pedro Miret Prieto | Old | Reelected | 1927 | 2016 | Male |
| 4 | José Ramón Machado Ventura | New | Reelected | 1930 | — | Male |
| 5 | Jorge Risquet Valdés-Saldaña | Old | Reelected | 1930 | 2015 | Male |
| 6 | Antonio Pérez Herrero | Old | Not | 19?? | — | Male |
| 7 | Jesús Montané Oropesa | New | Not | 1923 | 1999 | Male |
| 8 | Lionel Soto Prieto | New | Reelected | 1927 | 2008 | Male |
| 9 | Julián Rizo Alvarez | New | Reelected | 1944 | — | Male |
