= 3rd Secretariat of the Communist Party of Cuba =

The 3rd Secretariat of the Communist Party of Cuba (PCC) was elected in 1986 by the 1st Plenary Session of the 3rd Central Committee in the immediate aftermath of the 3rd Congress.

== Officers ==
Title	Name	Birth	Gender
First Secretary of the Central Committee of the Communist Party of Cuba	Fidel Alejandro Castro Ruz	1926	Male
Second Secretary of the Central Committee of the Communist Party of Cuba	Raúl Modesto Castro Ruz	1931	Male

== Members ==
Rank	Name	2nd SEC	Birth	Death	Gender
1	Fidel Alejandro Castro Ruz	Old	1926	2016	Male
2	Raúl Modesto Castro Ruz	Old	1931	—	Male
3	José Ramón Machado Ventura	Old	1930	—	Male
4	Jorge Risquet Valdés-Saldaña	Old	1930	2015	Male
5	Julián Rizo Alvarez	Old	1944	—	Male
6	José Ramón Balaguer Cabrera	New	1932	2022	Male
7	Sixto Batista Santana	New	1932	2014	Male
8	Jaime Crombet Hernández-Baquero	New	1941	2013	Male
9	Lionel Soto Prieto	Old	1927	2008	Male

== Changes ==
Name	Change	Date	Birth	Gender
Carlos Aldana Escalante	Appointed	23 December 1986	19??	Male
Pedro Alcántara Ross Leal	Appointed	23 December 1986	1939	Male
