= 1st Secretariat of the Communist Party of Cuba =

The 1st Secretariat of the Communist Party of Cuba (PCC) was elected in 1975 by the 1st Plenary Session of the 1st Central Committee in the immediate aftermath of the 1st Congress.

== Officers ==
Title	Name	Birth	Gender
First Secretary of the Central Committee of the Communist Party of Cuba	Fidel Alejandro Castro Ruz	1926	Male
Second Secretary of the Central Committee of the Communist Party of Cuba	Raúl Modesto Castro Ruz	1931	Male

== Members ==
Rank	Name	PRO SEC	2nd SEC	Birth	Death	Gender
1	Fidel Alejandro Castro Ruz	Old	Reelected	1926	2016	Male
2	Raúl Modesto Castro Ruz	Old	Reelected	1931	—	Male
3	Blas Roca Calderio	Old	Not	1908	1987	Male
4	Carlos Rafael Rodríguez Rodríguez	Old	Not	1913	1997	Male
5	Pedro Miret Prieto	New	Reelected	1927	2016	Male
6	Isidoro Octavio Malmierca Peolí	Old	Not	1930	2001	Male
7	Jorge Risquet Valdés-Saldaña	Old	Reelected	1930	2015	Male
8	Antonio Pérez Herrero	Old	Reelected	19??	—	Male
9	Raúl García Peláez	Old	Not	1922	2006	Male
