= Raúl Díaz-Argüelles =

Cuban colonel (1936–1975)

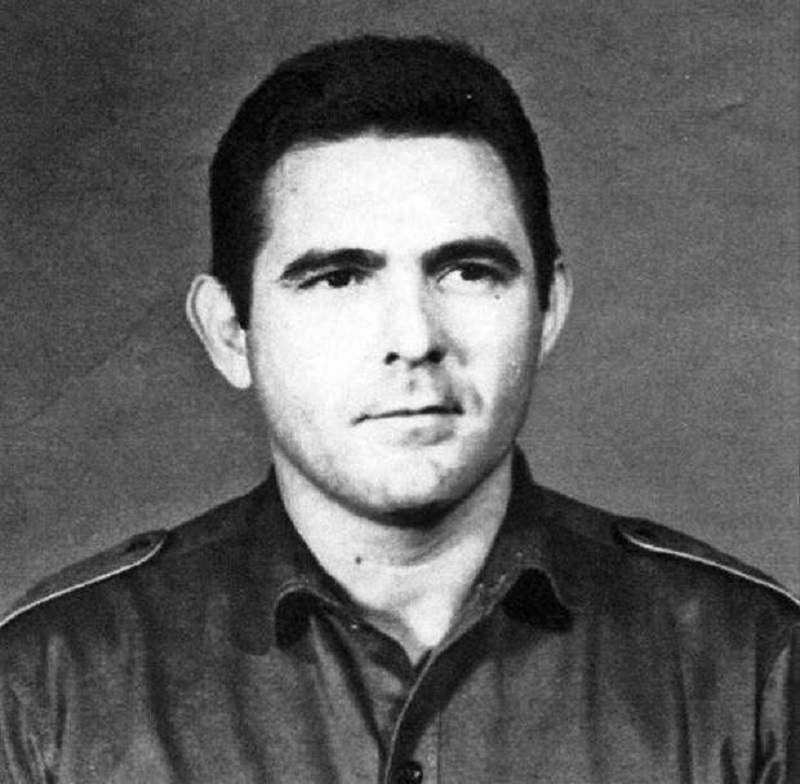
- Born: 14 September 1936; Marianao, Havana, Cuba
- Died: 11 December 1975 (aged 39); Ebo, Cuanza Sul Province, Angola
- Alma mater: University of Havana Frunze Military Academy
- Military career
- Allegiance: Cuba
- Branch: Revolutionary Armed Forces
- Rank: Brigadier General (posthumous)
- Commands: Cuban Military Mission in Angola Southern Front (Angola)
- Conflicts: Cuban Revolution; Attack on the Presidential Palace; Battle of Santa Clara; Escambray rebellion; Guinea-Bissau War of Independence; Angolan Civil War; Operation Carlota; Angolan War of Independence; Operation Savannah; Battle of Kifangondo; Battle of Ebo; Battle of Bridge 14

Raúl Díaz-Argüelles García (14 September 1936 – 11 December 1975) was a Cuban military officer who participated in the Cuban Revolution and internationalist missions in Africa. Díaz-Argüelles arrived in Angola in 1975, using the pseudonym Domingos da Silva to organize military schools for the FAPLA. In Lisbon, he had been negotiating the entry of Cuban troops since April 1975. Despite this, and facing the South African Army, troops from Zaire, and the FNLA, Díaz-Argüelles assumed command of the Southern Front of Cuban and Angolan forces. During the Battle of Ebo, he set an ambush at a bridge crossing the Mabassa River, dying at age 39 due to injuries from an anti-tank mine explosion that destroyed his armored vehicle on 11 December 1975.

== Early life ==
He was born in Marianao, Havana, on 14 September 1936, son of Marina and Raúl, who had been active in the struggle against dictator Gerardo Machado in the 1930s. He completed primary education in 1949. His wealthy family, to keep him away from the student struggle against Fulgencio Batista, sent him to the United States to study at the Riverside Military Academy in Tennessee, where he graduated as a high school senior in 1954.

== Political trajectory before 1959 ==
Upon completing the aforementioned school and during vacation, he returned to Cuba and joined the fight against Fulgencio Batista, together with Juan Pedro Carbó Serviá, José Machado, Fructuoso Rodríguez, José Antonio Echeverría, and other comrades. They formed part of the Revolutionary Directorate 13th of March (DR-13-3). In August 1955, he figured in a plan to attack the Presidential Palace, the Bureau of Investigations, and the Motorized Radio, which could not be carried out. He was also involved in an attempt on the life of dictator Fulgencio Batista. Persecuted, Díaz-Argüelles went into exile in November 1956. In August 1957, he returned at the head of a plane with supplies for the revolutionary struggle. The aircraft crashed on the Vía Monumental, but the weapons were saved and hidden in the town of Jamaica. Unable to make contact with his fighting comrades, most of whom were exiled or murdered, he decided to return to Miami on a cargo ship. In mid-1957, aboard the yacht Scapade, he landed at Nuevitas Bay, Camagüey, together with 15 other revolutionaries. He was among the founders of the DR-13-3 Guerrilla Front in the Escambray Mountains, in central Cuba. Due to his knowledge of Havana, he was ordered to organize the urban guerrilla of his organization in the capital. He participated in the attempt on the life of the regime's Minister of the Interior, Santiago Rey, who was wounded. After Eduardo García Lavandero was assassinated shortly afterward, Díaz-Argüelles took his position as head of action for the Revolutionary Directorate 13 March. He was present at the attack on the 15th Police Station in Havana, and later, together with Gustavo Machín, went to the Escambray Mountains, where he participated alongside Che Guevara in the Battle of Santa Clara, for which he was promoted to the military rank of Comandante. During the Las Villas Campaign he fought in Fomento, Báez, Cabaiguán, Placetas, and Trinidad.

== Military trajectory after 1959 ==
After the triumph of the Cuban Revolution in 1959, he was appointed executive assistant to the G-5 Inspection Directorate of the General Staff of the Rebel Army, later head of the Technical Investigations Department of the National Revolutionary Police (PNR). In February 1962, he joined the ranks of the Revolutionary Armed Forces (FAR), where he held various responsibilities. He worked actively in the Section of "Struggle Against Bandits" (LCB), where he fought the anti-communist peasant guerrillas, first in Las Villas province and mainly those operating in Matanzas province, until they were eliminated. Later, between 1965 and 1966, he was sent to study at the "Frunze" Military Academy in the Soviet Union, where he learned about troop leadership, command, and handling. There he was recognized upon completing his military training as "Red File", equivalent to a Gold Diploma in the Western Hemisphere. Upon returning to Cuba from Moscow, he was assigned a high military position as Second Chief of the Operations Directorate of MINFAR. In 1969, he left to support the Guinea-Bissau War of Independence, being one of the liberators of that African country. He also served as Cuba's Principal Military Advisor in Guinea (Conakry). Among his many merits stands out the responsibility assigned by Fidel Castro himself in May 1975, when in response to Agostinho Neto's request for increased military aid, he was instructed to direct on the ground the Cuban Military Mission in Angola during its first stage, entering Angolan territory. This Military Mission consisted of a group of 429 Cuban officers who participated in the creation of 4 Military Instruction Centers with capacity for 500 students each, in Benguela, Salazar (now N'dalatando), Henrique de Carvalho (now Saurimo), and the oil enclave of Cabinda, where thousands of FAPLA combatants were trained. This preparation succeeded in repelling the enemy, composed of regular troops from Zaire, the FNLA, and European mercenaries from the north of Angola, as well as South African army forces and UNITA from the south, advancing in different directions to frustrate the MPLA's seizure of power. It also enabled the defeat in Cabinda of the Zairian forces which, together with the Front for the Liberation of the Enclave of Cabinda (FLEC) and European mercenaries, attacked that territory from three directions with tanks, artillery, and armored vehicles three days before the proclamation of Angola's independence, achieving a brilliant victory in that battle on 12 November 1975, under the leadership of today's Army Corps General Ramón Espinosa Martín. While serving as First Chief of the Cuban Military Mission in Angola, Díaz-Argüelles meticulously directed the preparation of the MPLA's Angolan forces and the first combat actions in which Cuban instructors fought alongside FAPLA combatants in the defense of the capital Luanda, since whoever held the Angolan capital would be recognized as the government of the African country. Given the complicated situation, it was decided to send complete units of regular MINFAR troops, designating as chief of the Military Mission first the current Army Corps General Leopoldo Cintra Frías on 13 November 1975, until the arrival in that country of the also current Army Corps General Abelardo Colomé Ibarra, who assumed command of the Mission on 26 November. For this reason, then Comandante Raúl Díaz-Argüelles García passed to command the largest grouping of Cuban troops in Angolan territory, being assigned Chief of the Southern Front of the war. The Southern Front included some 300 elite combatants from the Special Troops of the Ministry of the Interior, who prevented the fall of Luanda by obstructing the enemy's passage across the strategic Queve River.

== Death in combat ==
Raúl Díaz-Argüelles García died in combat in the early hours of 11 December 1975, in Hengo, Cuanza Sur province, when the armored personnel carrier in which he was traveling struck an anti-tank mine. His death occurred exactly one month after the proclamation of the independence of Angola.

== Decorations received ==
He was the first Cuban officer with the rank of Comandante to be posthumously promoted to the military rank of Brigadier General in 1976. On the occasion of the 40th Anniversary of Angola's Independence, on 10 September 2015, the Council of State of the Republic of Cuba agreed to award him posthumously the Honorary Title of Hero of the Republic of Cuba. Attached to that Honorary Title, he was awarded the Order "Máximo Gómez" First Class, to be delivered to his relatives on the occasion of the solemn act for the 40th Anniversary of Angola's Independence, on 11 November 2015. He also received the Order Agostinho Neto, posthumously, awarded by the President of Angola, João Lourenço, in a solemn ceremony at the Palace of the Revolution in Havana, on 1 July 2019.

== Legacy ==
In recognition of his role and sacrifice in the struggle for Angolan independence, a general hospital in Sumbe, Cuanza Sul Province, was inaugurated in his name on 21 October 2024 by President João Lourenço. On 1 October 2025, his daughter Natasha Díaz-Argüelles received, on his behalf, the Commemorative Medal of the 50th Anniversary of National Independence (Peace and Development Class) from President Lourenço, who highlighted ongoing Angolan admiration for his contributions half a century later.

== Bibliography ==
- Taibo, Paco Ignacio; Ignacio Taibo II, Paco (2001). Archanges: douze histoires de révolutionnaires sans révolution possible. Bibliothèque hispano-américaine (in French). Paris: Métailié. p. 339. ISBN 978-2864243960. OCLC 48999517.

== External Sources ==
Rinden homenaje cubanos y angolanos al general Raúl Díaz Argüelles http://edicionesanteriores.trabajadores.cu/2006/julio/26/elmundo/raul.htm

"Raúl Díaz Argüelles". EcuRed (in Spanish).
