= Miles Larmer =

British historian and academic

Professor Miles Larmer FRHistS
- Born: 27 July 1969 (age 57)
- Occupations: Historian and academic
- Spouse: Laura Cole

Academic background
- Education: Polytechnic of Central London; Institute of Commonwealth Studies; School of African and Oriental Studies; St Cross College, Oxford; University of Sheffield
- Doctoral advisor: Ian Phimister

Academic work
- Discipline: History; African studies
- Sub-discipline: History of Africa; Political history; Social history; Cultural history; Environmental history
- Institutions: University of Pretoria; Keele University; Sheffield Hallam University; University of Sheffield; St Antony's College, Oxford; University of Florida

Miles Larmer FRHistS (born 27 July 1969) is a British historian of southern and central Africa from the mid-twentieth century onwards, specialising in its political, social, cultural and environmental history. He is Professor of History and Director of the Center for African Studies at the University of Florida.

== Academic career ==
Larmer obtained his undergraduate degree in social science from the Polytechnic of Central London in 1990 and then obtained a master's degree in African studies from the Institute of Commonwealth Studies and School of Oriental and African Studies in 1993. Larmer completed his doctoral studies under the supervision of Ian Phimister, initially at St Cross College, Oxford and then the University of Sheffield. After its completion he held a postdoctoral research fellowship at the University of Pretoria between 2004 and 2006 and was then appointed to successive lectureships at Keele University, Sheffield Hallam University and the University of Sheffield. At the latter institution he co-directed the Centre for the Study of Democratic Culture.

In 2013 Larmer was elected a Fellow of St Antony's College, Oxford and joined the Faculty of History at the University of Oxford as Associate Professor of African History. The university conferred the Title of Distinction of Professor of African History upon him in December 2016. In 2023 he moved to the University of Florida to take up his current academic positions while remaining a senior research associate at Oxford's African Studies Centre.

Between 2008 and 2011 Larmer served as editor of the academic journal Review of African Political Economy and sat on its editorial board between 2007 and 2013. He has also been a member of the editorial board of the Journal of Southern African Studies since 2008. Since 2012 he has edited the Palgrave Macmillan book series Studies in Democratic Culture.

In 2011 Larmer was awarded a one-year research fellowship from the Arts and Humanities Research Council for the project 'Local Identities and Transnational Conflict: the Katangese Gendarmes and Central-Southern Africa's Forty-years war, 1960-1999'. Between 2016 and 2021 he was the principal investigator of the €1.6 million European Research Council-funded project 'Comparing the Copperbelt: Political Culture and Knowledge Production in Central Africa'.

== Selected publications ==
- Mineworkers in Zambia: Labour and Political Change in Post-Colonial Africa. 2006. (International Library of African Studies)
- The Musakanya Papers. The Autobiographical Writings of Valentine Musakanya. 2010.
- Zambia, Mining, and Neoliberalism: Boom and Bust on the Globalized Copperbelt. 2010. (Africa Connects) (With Alastair Fraser)
- African Struggles Today: Social Movements Since Independence. 2012. (With Peter Dwyer)
- Rethinking African Politics: A History of Opposition in Zambia. 2016. (Empires and the Making of the Modern World, 1650-2000)
- The Katangese Gendarmes and War in Central Africa: Fighting Their Way Home. 2016. (With Erik Kennes)
