= António França =

Angolan footballer and politician

General António Santos França "Ndalu" is a former footballer and Angolan politician, born in the town of Mupa in Cunene on April 9, 1938. He played as a midfielder. Following his short sporting career, he completed his studies in Portugal and Cuba and returned to Angola, where he became a fervent anti-colonial activist, and became General "Ndalu". In 1988, dos Santos França was chief of staff for the People's Armed Forces for the Liberation of Angola (FAPLA).

Dos Santos França later became Minister of Defence, first Angolan Ambassador to the United States 1995, and a member of the De Beers Angola Board from October 2005 to March 2010.
