= Jorge Risquet =

Cuban revolutionary and politician

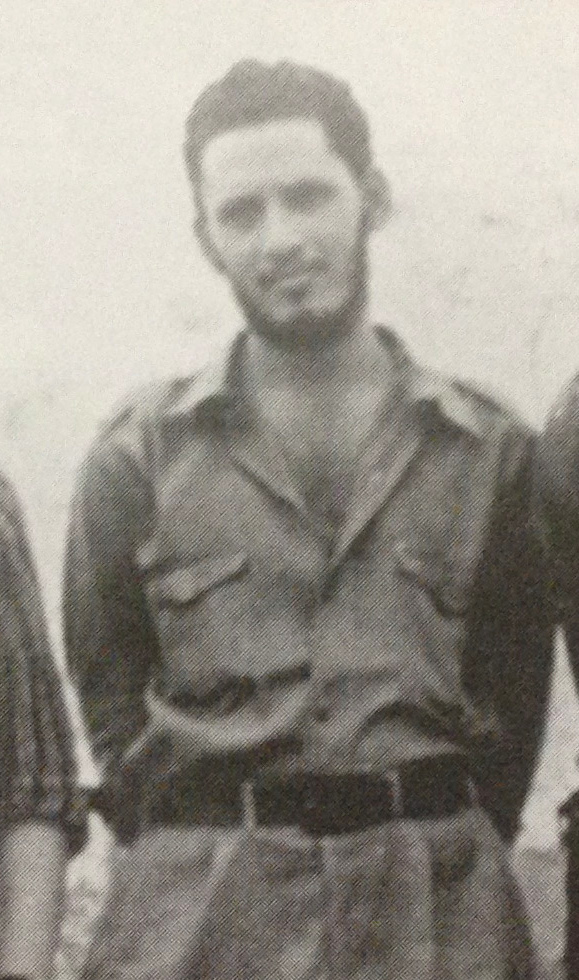
- Risquet in 1958, during the Cuban Revolution
- Born: 6 May 1930; Havana, Cuba
- Died: 28 September 2015 (aged 85) (aged 85) Havana, Cuba
- Occupations: Politician, Diplomat
- Political party: Popular Socialist Party (1943-1958) PCC (1965-2015)
- Other political affiliations: World Federation of Democratic Youth (1954)

Jorge Risquet Valdés-Saldaña (6 May 1930 – 28 September 2015) was a Cuban revolutionary and politician. He participated in the Sierra Maestra guerrilla campaign against the government of Fulgencio Batista during the Cuban Revolution, and later became involved in the Angolan Civil War. He assisted in peace negotiations between Angola and South Africa, which led to the independence of Namibia and contributed to the release of Nelson Mandela and the end of apartheid. He was member of the Politburo of the Communist Party of Cuba from 1980 to 1991.

== Early life ==
Risquet grew up in a poor family living in a solar, or a tenement home, where a family lived in one room and shared a bathroom with other families. Living in poverty, both of Risquet's parents worked in the tobacco industry and developed a relationship in the Cuban Communist Party, in turn radicalizing Risquet in his youth.

== Political career ==
Risquet was politically active in Guatemala, where he represented Latin America in the World Federation of Democratic Youth until the US-backed coup there in 1954. In Guatemala, Risquet met Argentine doctor and later leader of the Cuban Revolution, Ernesto "Che" Guevara. During Batista's rule in Cuba, Risquet was subjected to torture and imprisoned for five months, due to his leadership in the Popular Socialist Party (PSP).

Risquet fought in the Cuban Revolution, starting in 1958. After Batista was finally overthrown, Risquet became an important figure within the new revolutionary government under Fidel Castro.

In October 1964, Risquet represented Cuba in a meeting with Nikita Khrushchev in regards to getting greater Soviet support for Cuba in the face of American hegemony. This meeting fell apart, as Khrushchev was not receptive to aiding Cuba, and, according to Risquet himself, "the tone was bitter." Upon his return from Africa in 1967, Risquet was in multiple government roles, including Minister of Labor, where he led public policy of lambasting Cuban women that stayed at home, rather than committing to working. He additionally worked as an advisor to Raúl Castro in 1991.

== Missions to Africa ==
=== Congo-Brazzaville and Guinea-Bissau (1965-1967) ===
Risquet's start in assistance to Africa was in 1965, when Castro sent him to work with the government of Congo-Brazzaville while Che Guevara fought against CIA-backed mercenaries in Congo-Leopoldville, or Zaire. There, he was integral in mitigating a military coup from taking place, and he additionally was a part of Congo-Brazzaville's first initiative to vaccinate children for polio, and as a result thousands of Congolese youth were inoculated. However, the coup in conjunction with disappointment in the effectiveness of assisting the Angolan MPLA troops from Congo-Brazzaville led Risquet to leave Africa. Risquet's return to Cuba was additionally caused by President Luís Cabral's rejection of additional Cuban assistance in Guinea-Bissau.

=== Angola (1975-1979) ===
Because of his efforts in the Congo and close ties with the MPLA, Risquet was chosen to lead diplomatic relations with Angola once the dictatorship under Portugal fell apart in 1975. In late 1977, after being tasked with leading the Cuban intervention in Angola, Risquet led the bargaining of compensation for more Cuban personnel in Angola after President Agostinho Neto requested for more aid. After about four months of negotiations, the Cuban and Angolan governments came to a consensus in January, greatly expanding the thousands of Cubans providing education and healthcare in the region as the civil war continued. Cuba, however, was economically burdened by the internationalist mission in Angola, and could not support the immense capital and human costs, leading to Risquet returning to Havana in 1979.

=== Namibia (1978-1991) ===
Apartheid South Africa had occupied Namibia as South West Africa since World War I despite a 1971 international court ruling which deemed the occupation illegal. Resistance to what was seen as an illegal occupation developed into the South African Border War between South West Africa People's Organization (SWAPO) insurgents and South African/ South-West African security forces. Risquet maintained a diplomatic relationship with SWAPO, taking a hardline approach by persuading SWAPO to take the position that, if Namibian Independence were to occur, then South Africa would also relinquish control of the wealthy Walvis Bay port back to the free Namibia. In 1987-1988, Cuban and FAPLA troops became involved in a serious clash with UNITA and South African forces in southern Angola during the Battle of Cuito Cuanavale. Fears that the conflict could escalate precipitated negotiations between the United States, Cuba, Angola, the Soviet Union and South Africa regarding the end of the South African Border War, the withdrawal of Cuban forces from Anglo, and Namibian independence. Following months of negotiations, an agreement was reached which allowed for a phased withdrawal of Cuban troops from Angola and South African forces from Namibia. The last Cuban troops left Angola in 1991.
