= 2026 United States fuel blockade on Cuba =

Ongoing oil shortage and economic crisis

- Part of Operation Southern Spear, the aftermath of the U.S. intervention in Venezuela, U.S. embargo on Cuba, and American expansionism under Donald Trump
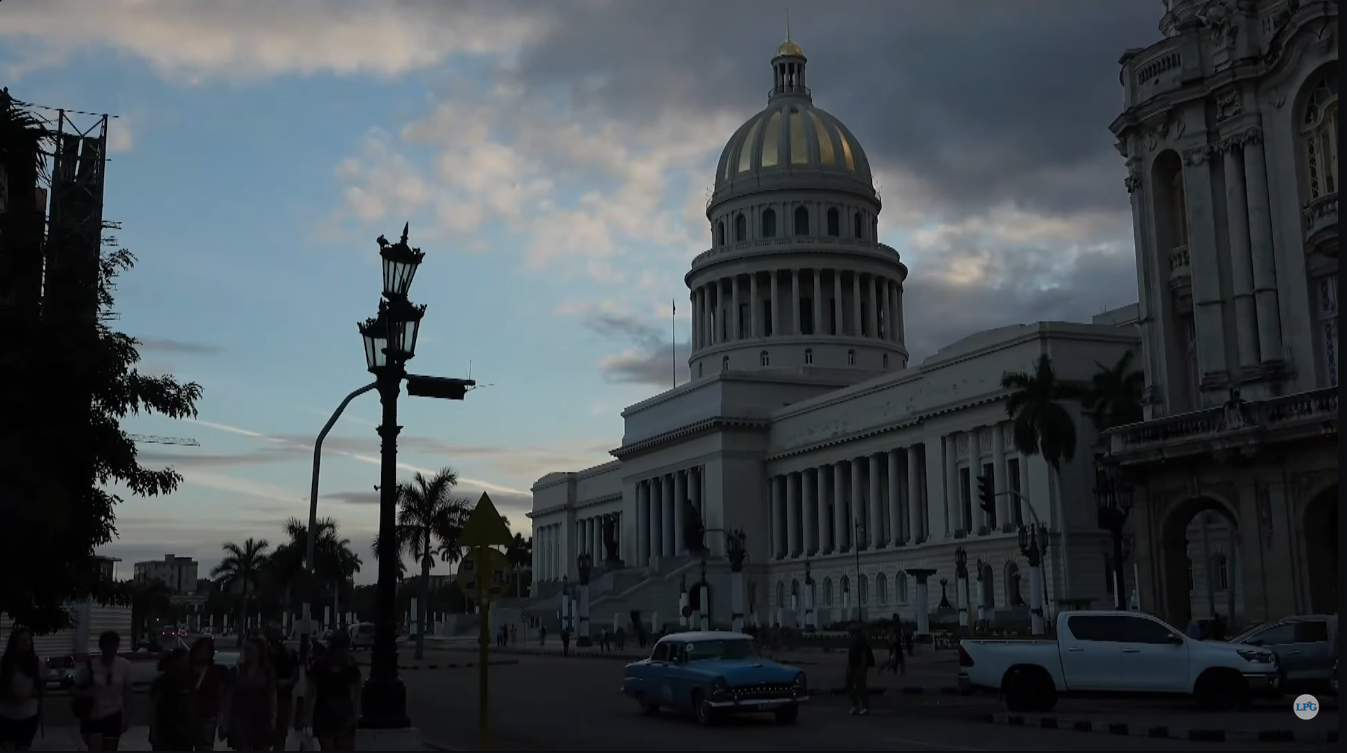
- The National Capitol of Cuba without power in January 2026
Date	3 January 2026 – present (9 months, 4 weeks and 2 days)
Location	Cuba
Status	Ongoing: U.S. threatens to sanction any country that exports oil to Cuba; U.S. calls for the resignation of Miguel Díaz-Canel; Cuba releases more than 2,000 prisoners; A Russian oil tanker carrying 100,000 tonnes of crude oil arrives in Cuba on 30 March; U.S. threats to attack Cuba after Iran; U.S. indictment of Raúl Castro

Parties involved
United States	Cuba
Supported by: Shield of the Americas; Cuban opposition	Supported by: Russia

Commanders and leaders
(United States) Donald Trump (United States) Marco Rubio (United States) Pete Hegseth (United States) John Ratcliffe; José Daniel Ferrer; Luis Manuel Otero Alcántara; María Payá Acevedo; Manuel Cuesta Morúa Duniel Hernández Santos (POW) (per Cuba)	(Cuba) Miguel Díaz-Canel (Cuba) Salvador Valdés Mesa (Cuba) Manuel Marrero Cruz (Cuba) Esteban Lazo Hernández (Cuba) Bruno Rodríguez Parrilla (Cuba) Álvaro López Miera (Cuba) Raúl Castro (Cuba) Raúl G. Rodríguez Castro (Cuba) Oscar Pérez

Casualties and losses
None 5 killed, 5 injured	Unspecified amount of deaths reported by doctors

Since January 2026, the United States has been imposing a fuel blockade on Cuba, causing an ongoing fuel shortage and economic crisis in the latter. As an island, Cuba heavily depends on importing petroleum to meet its energy needs, particularly from nearby Venezuela and Mexico. Following the 2026 United States intervention in Venezuela, in which U.S. forces ousted President Nicolás Maduro, Venezuelan oil exports to Cuba were cut off, leaving the country without adequate supply. In addition, the U.S. enacted a blockade on oil coming into Venezuela a month prior. The United States is reportedly motivated by a desire for regime change in Cuba by the end of 2026, or, according to other sources, by the end of Donald Trump's term in 2029.

The United States began blocking oil tankers heading to Cuba in February 2026, targeting companies such as the Mexican state-owned Pemex and threatening the responsible countries with tariffs should they resist. According to The New York Times later in February, this is the United States' first effective blockade of Cuba since the Cuban Missile Crisis. In January 2026, U.S. president Donald Trump called on Cuba to 'make a deal before it's too late'. Trump subsequently said the U.S. could implement a friendly takeover of Cuba.

On 13 March 2026, Cuban Communist Party first secretary Miguel Díaz-Canel publicly confirmed for the first time that his government was engaged in diplomatic talks with the United States aimed at addressing the severe U.S.‑imposed oil and energy blockade that had left them facing crippling fuel shortages and widespread power outages. The announcement came after years of frosty bilateral relations and was framed as an effort to find "solutions". As part of the effort, Cuba initially agreed to release 51 political prisoners. On 3 April 2026, Cuba released more than 2,000 prisoners. On 14 May 2026, the Cuban Ministry of Energy and Mines warned that the country had run out of oil and diesel.

== Background ==
Following the Cuban Revolution that brought Fidel Castro into power in 1959, the United States has maintained an embargo on Cuba since 1962 after the Castro administration nationalized all U.S. properties. The severity of the embargo has varied over time, with a notable thaw in relations under President Barack Obama. The impact of the embargo became particularly consequential only after the collapse of the Soviet Union and the Eastern Bloc in 1991, who collectively supplied between 70% and 80% of Cuba's imports. This led to an economic crisis and the start of the Special Period, which lasted until 2000. The crisis significantly improved in 1999 after Hugo Chávez was elected as president of Venezuela, and began to support the country with heavily subsidized oil shipments. In return, Cuba sent doctors and security personnel to Venezuela.

During the second Trump presidency in January 2025, the U.S. government significantly tightened its economic sanctions against Cuba, orienting it around what it calls a "total pressure" or "maximum pressure" strategy.

A 2026 report by the Center for Economic and Policy Research stated that sanctions imposed on Cuba during Trump's first term were “likely the primary cause” for the increase in Cuba's infant mortality rate. Between 2018 and 2025, the rate increased 148%, from 4 to 9.9 per 1,000 live births. This also coincided with increased sanctions by the Joe Biden administration. The report didn't cover the effects of the 2026 U.S. fuel blockade but the authors speculated that it will likely have worsened the situation.

Cuba's economy is dependent on foreign oil with most oil historically imported from Venezuela and Mexico. Recent but persistent issues with Cuba's economy and electrical grid triggered the 2024–2026 Cuban protests and 2024–2026 Cuba blackouts. In December 2025, as part of the escalation that ended with the United States intervention in Venezuela, the United States seized tankers with Venezuelan oil destined for Cuba and declared a blockade on exports of Venezuelan oil.

After the Venezuela intervention by the U.S. that led to the capture of incumbent Venezuelan president Nicolás Maduro, Trump threatened potential military action towards multiple territories like Greenland, Colombia, Iran, and Cuba. On 29 January 2026, Executive Order 14380 was signed and entered into force on 30 January, declaring a national emergency in U.S. and authorizing the imposition of additional tariffs on imports into the United States from countries that directly or indirectly supply oil to Cuba. The United States confirmed that regime change in Cuba is a goal by the end of the year, asking the government of First Secretary of the Communist Party of Cuba Miguel Díaz-Canel to "make a deal before it's too late".

== Impacts ==
According to the United Nations Human Rights Office, the blockade and ensuing fuel shortage have threatened Cuba's food supply and disrupted the country's water systems and hospitals. The fuel shortage has prevented the harvesting of crops and undermined efforts toward food sovereignty. The lack of fuel has also hampered the UN World Food Programme relief efforts following Hurricane Melissa. In response, the Cuban government has closed schools and universities and limited public transport. Garbage has accumulated throughout Havana and other cities due to the lack of fuel for garbage trucks.

In June 2026, OHCHR reported that infant mortality rate had increased to 9.9 per 1,000 births (up from 4 per 1,000 births in 2018), childhood cancer survival rates had reduced to 65%, food production had reduced by 60%, and medicine supplies were available at only 30% normal supply due to shortages caused by U.S. sanctions.

Widespread electricity shortages and long blackouts have been reported across Cuba during the ongoing energy crisis. In some areas, power cuts have lasted up to 20–22 hours a day. Cuban authorities say this is mainly due to a shortage of fuel needed to run power plants. Other reports, including The Guardian, link the situation to reduced fuel imports and U.S. sanctions and trade restrictions affecting Cuba's access to energy supplies. These blackouts have disrupted daily life, including transport, hospitals, communication, and work.

=== Blackouts ===
Cuba experienced its lowest-ever temperature of 0 °C (32 °F) on 3 February as measured at a weather station in Matanzas Province. On 4 February, the eastern provinces of Guantánamo, Santiago de Cuba, Holguín and Granma suffered a total blackout, while the western part of the island and Havana suffered serious difficulties with electricity. On 4 March, a shutdown of the Antonio Guiteras Power Plant resulted in power outages for millions of Cubans in the western part of the country. On 16 March, Cuba's power grid collapsed leaving the country without power.

=== Aircraft fuel crisis and collapse in tourism ===
On 9 February, Cuba stated that it would not refuel other planes at airports due to a lack of fuel. Air Canada suspended flights to the country on the same day, while Rossiya and Nordwind did so two days later, all citing ongoing fuel shortages in the island as a reason.

The number of foreign travellers to Cuba has plummeted by approximately 58% as of 17 June, due to the cancellation of international flights from major destinations like Canada, whose citizens represented by far the largest contingent of foreign travellers to the island.

=== Havana oil refinery fire ===
A fire broke out at a key fuel processing plant on 13 February in Havana, exacerbating the energy crisis further since the executive order of Trump on 29 January, which imposed an oil blockade. A large plume of smoke was seen rising above Havana Bay from the Nico López refinery on Friday, drawing the attention of the capital's residents before fading as fire crews fought to bring the situation under control. Cuba's Ministry of Energy and Mines said the fire, which erupted in a warehouse at the refinery, was eventually extinguished and that "the cause is under investigation". There were no injuries and the fire did not spread to nearby areas, the ministry said in a post on social media. The ministry said the workday at the Nico López Refinery "continues with complete normalcy". The location of the fire was close to where two oil tankers were moored in Havana's harbour.

=== Other effects of shortages ===
On 14 February, it was announced Festival del Habano, an annual cigar festival, was called off due to "the complex economic situation" caused by the "economic, commercial and financial blockade" by the U.S. On 17 February 2026, it was reported that many collection trucks had been left with empty fuel tanks, causing refuse to pile up on the streets of the capital, Havana, and other cities and towns. Only 44 of Havana's 106 rubbish trucks (approximately 41.5% of them) have been able to keep operating due to the fuel shortages, slowing rubbish collection, as waste piled up on Havana's street corners. Canadian mining company Sherritt announced that it would pause operations at its mining facility in Moa. State media reported in June that the blockade was damaging the health sector, with locally produced medicines unavailable, kidney dialysis disrupted, and nutrition programs far under capacity.

A United Nations human rights report estimated that agricultural output had fallen by 60% in June 2026 due to fuel shortages.

=== Military ===
Amid the blockade, American reconnaissance flights near Cuba increased.

On 17 May, Axios reported classified U.S. intelligence that Cuba had acquired over 300 attack drones from Russia and Iran since 2023 and "recently began discussing plans" to attack the U.S. with them. Cuba described the case as "fraudulent" and a pretext for U.S. military action.

=== Cuban oil reserves ===
On 25 April 2026, Miguel Díaz-Canel announced that Cuban domestically-produced crude oil has been refined, when in reality the Cabaiguán refinery has been refining domestic crude oil since 2010, as acknowledged by the deputy director of CUPET during the April session of the National Council of Innovation (CNI). The announcement from the Cuban government revolves around a thermal conversion technology developed by the Oil Research Center (Ceinpet), affiliated with the Union Cuba Petróleo (CUPET), to process the heavy crude from the northern oil belt, characterized by its high density, viscosity, and sulfur content.

== International actions ==
=== Halt of Mexican oil ===
After the ousting of Maduro on 3 January, the United States began increasing its pressure on Mexico to reduce its oil sales to Cuba with President Donald Trump threatening tariffs against any country supplying Cuba with oil. On 9 January, the most recent (as of September 2026) oil shipment from Mexico arrived in Cuba, delivering 85,000 barrels of fuel. Mexico temporarily halted shipments of oil to Cuba by 27 January and Mexican President Claudia Sheinbaum said that the decision to halt oil deliveries was "a sovereign decision". In February 2026, Mexico sent two ships of humanitarian aid to Cuba to help alleviate the impacts of the U.S. embargo.

=== Cancelled visa-free entry to Nicaragua ===
The government of Nicaragua cancelled visa-free travel for Cuban citizens in February 2026. This border was a frequent route to escape Cuba, used by thousands of migrants since its implementation in November 2021 following the COVID-19 pandemic and the 2021 Cuban protests. It is unclear if the measure was a direct request from United States administration but it is part of a series of concessions made by the administration of Daniel Ortega.

=== Termination of Cuban medical mission ===
On 13 February, the Guatemalan health ministry announced it would begin a "phased withdrawal of the Cuban Medical Brigade". The decision was linked to pressure from the U.S., which has called the Cuban medical mission "forced labor". Income earned by doctors serving in foreign countries is an important source of revenue for the Cuban government. In February, Honduras announced that it was ending the Cuban medical mission. The Bahamas, Antigua and Barbuda, and Grenada have also said they would reduce use of Cuban healthcare workers.

U.S. diplomat Mike Hammer pressured the regional government of Calabria to end their reliance on Cuban medical staff. President of Calabria Roberto Occhiuto said that Cuban doctors were necessary "to keep hospitals and emergency rooms open" in the region, but that he would consider alternatives to hiring more Cuban doctors. Occhiuto denied the U.S. argument that the program was human trafficking.

=== U.S. license to sell Venezuelan oil to Cuba ===
On 25 February, the United States emitted a license allowing companies to resell Venezuelan oil to Cuba's private sector. The U.S. Treasury Department indicated that the exchange must "support the Cuban people, including the private sector".

=== U.S. response on humanitarian aid ===
In May 2026, U.S. Secretary of State Marco Rubio said the United States had offered $100 million in humanitarian aid to Cuba, including food and medical supplies. He criticized the Cuban government, saying it was preventing humanitarian aid from reaching the population. The statement was made in the context of long-standing U.S. sanctions and trade restrictions on Cuba, which have restricted economic and humanitarian flows to the country. Rubio also described the situation in Cuba as "unacceptable" and called for major changes in the country's governance.

=== Blockade of payment systems ===
In June 2026, the United States warned about the blockade of payment systems, including Visa and Mastercard with a goal of limiting tourism on the island, from which the Cuban government uses as a source of income.

=== Surveillance ===
In May 2026, The New York Times reported that the U.S. administration increased surveillance of Cuba.

=== Ecuador's expulsion of Cuban ambassador ===
On 4 March 2026, Ecuador expelled Cuban Ambassador Basilio Gutierrez and his staff, declaring them persona non grata. No reason was provided for the expulsion.

=== Russian aid to Cuba ===
On 30 March, a Russian oil tanker, the Anatoly Kolodkin, carrying 100,000 tonnes of crude oil, or 730,000 barrels, arrived in Havana. The Russian shipment could be converted into 250,000 barrels of diesel which could cover Cuban energy demands for 12.5 days. The Guardian argued that the docking of the Russian tanker signals greater American flexibility in the ability of Cuba to purchase oil from abroad.

On 27 May, the Universal, a Russian fuel tanker, failed to reach Cuba, turning around off the coast of Brazil. The vessel itself is subject to U.S. sanctions and some speculate that the ship was interceded by American naval authorities.

=== Chinese aid to Cuba ===
China donated 15,000 tons of rice to Cuba as humanitarian aid.

=== Negotiations ===
Miguel Diaz-Canel talks to press about the pardon to political prisoners in March 2026.

After initiating the blockade, President Trump called on Cuba to "make a deal before it's too late" without specifying any potential terms. On 1 February, Trump said that the U.S. was negotiating with "the highest people in Cuba". However, Drop Site News reported that there were no high-level negotiations occurring between the U.S. and Cuba. On 26 February, the Miami Herald reported that the U.S. had been speaking to former First Secretary Raúl Castro's grandson, Raúl Guillermo Rodríguez Castro, who is not a senior leader of the Cuban Communist Party. The next day, Trump again claimed to be negotiating with the Cuban government saying that the U.S. could "have a friendly takeover of Cuba". In a March address on Cuban television, First Secretary Díaz-Canel confirmed that negotiations with the U.S. were taking place.

In March 2026, the Cuban government announced that it would release 51 political prisoners in the coming days. The move was described as being taken "in a spirit of goodwill" and followed diplomatic engagement with the Holy See, which has been involved in dialogue with Cuban authorities. The government stated that the prisoners had served a significant portion of their sentences and demonstrated good conduct.

== Reactions ==
=== Cuban Communist Party and government ===
Initially, First Secretary of the Cuban Communist Party Miguel Díaz-Canel condemned "U.S. imperialism", and called on people to prepare for a "war of the entire nation", while organizing state-sponsored demonstrations against the American oil blockade. On 6 February, he declared that "Cuba is ready for a talk with Washington on every topic without prerequisites", while rejecting negotiations on cases that he viewed as "internal Cuban affairs".

=== Cuban opposition ===
On 6 February, El País conducted interviews with various Cuban dissidents, including José Daniel Ferrer, Manuel Cuesta Morúa, and María Payá Acevedo. Their reactions were a mix of hope and warning against manipulations, including views that the Cuban government could cease talks when it stabilizes itself. On 22 May, Cuban opposition leader Ferrer claimed that there is no doubt that the communist regime will end by the end of 2026.

=== Other countries ===
- Argentina: President Javier Milei supported the United States and condemned the Cuban government for "authoritarianism". On 6 May 2026, Milei said during a conference in Los Angeles that he wished that Cuba and Venezuela would reach the American Dream soon, calling it a "freedom model" and hoping that it will get to the rest of Latin America.
- Brazil: President Luiz Inácio Lula da Silva condemned the U.S. fuel blockade and called for humanitarian help for Cubans.
- Canada: Minister of Foreign Affairs Anita Anand announced C$8 million in funding to expand food and nutrition programs in Cuba in response to the humanitarian crisis, stating "as the people of Cuba face significant hardship, Canada stands in solidarity and is providing targeted assistance to help address urgent needs". Anand later announced an additional C$5.5 million in international assistance in response to the humanitarian crisis.
- Chile: Then-current president Gabriel Boric called the blockade "criminal" and "inhumane", saying that "nothing justifies the harm being done to boys, girls, and innocent citizens". Then-incoming president José Antonio Kast in turn disagreed with Boric's decision to send humanitarian aid, claiming that it ultimately benefits a "dictatorship".
- Colombia: Then-current left-wing President Gustavo Petro visited Havana and condemned U.S. pressure on Cuba. Then-incoming, right-wing President Abelardo de la Espriella expressed support for American actions, stating that he supported regime change in Cuba and suggesting that Cuba should be turned into a territory of the United States.
- China: Spokesperson of the Ministry of Foreign Affairs Lin Jian stated "China firmly supports Cuba in safeguarding its national sovereignty and security, and opposes foreign interference" and "will always provide support and help to the Cuban side to the best of our ability." Xi Jinping, the General Secretary of the Chinese Communist Party, approved an aid for Cuba, which includes financial assistance valued at 80 million dollars and a donation of 60,000 tons of rice. On 26 September 2026, at the general debate of the eighty-first session of the United Nations General Assembly, Vice President Han Zheng said "China urges the relevant country to immediately stop using threat of force against Cuba and immediately and completely lift the blockade and sanctions against Cuba".
- Mexico: President Claudia Sheinbaum warned about a potential humanitarian crisis, and expressed concerns about Cuba's sovereignty being violated.
- Portugal: Portuguese authorities are helping tourists return to Portugal via a stopover in the Dominican Republic due to the fuel scarcity in Cuba. The Portuguese hotel chain Vila Galé closed its operations in Varadero and Havana.
- Russia: President Vladimir Putin condemned U.S. actions and claimed that Russia will continue to send oil to Cuba despite the threats of blockade.
- Trinidad and Tobago: Prime Minister Kamla Persad-Bissessar stated that while the humanitarian crisis was a concern, Trinidad and Tobago "will not ... support a dictatorship in Cuba or anywhere else" and that no CARICOM country should entertain dictatorial governments.
- United Nations: Secretary-General António Guterres stated that he is "extremely concerned" about the humanitarian situation in Cuba, "which will worsen, or even collapse", if the country's oil needs are not met. UN experts have condemned the executive order issued by the Trump administration, describing the imposition of a fuel blockade on Cuba as "a serious violation of international law and a grave threat to a democratic and equitable international order."

Belarus, Iran, Spain, Vietnam, and the African Union also expressed their support for Cuba.

=== Other ===
In February 2026, activists announced plans for the Nuestra América Convoy, which will attempt to break the U.S. blockade and provide humanitarian aid to Cuba during the crisis. The flotilla is organized by Progressive International and contains members of the Global Sumud Flotilla that had attempted to break the Israeli blockade of the Gaza Strip. Streamer and political commentator Hasan Piker was on the Flotilla.

== See also ==
- 2021–2023 Cuban migration crisis
- 2026 Cuban boat incident
- Bay of Pigs Invasion
- Cuba–United States relations
- United States involvement in regime change
