= Plaza Carlos III =

Shopping centre in Havana, Cuba

- Interior of Plaza Carlos III in 2015
- Location: Centro Habana, Havana, Cuba
- Address: Avenida Salvador Allende (Carlos III), between Árbol Seco and Pajarito
- Opened: 17 October 1997
- Previous names: Centro Comercial Carlos III
- Developer: CIMEX
- Owner: CIMEX
- Floors: 4
- Parking: c. 200 spaces (as planned in 1997)

Plaza Carlos III is a shopping centre on Avenida Salvador Allende, popularly known as Carlos III, in Centro Habana, Havana, Cuba. It occupies a 1950s market building, the Mercado Carlos III, which the Cuban state corporation CIMEX rebuilt at a cost of about US$10 million and opened as a shopping centre on 17 October 1997.

Opened during the Special Period, four years after Cubans were permitted to hold United States dollars, the centre sold imported and domestic goods for hard currency to a mainly Cuban clientele. Contemporary press described it as the first shopping centre opened in Havana in decades, and an ethnographer of the period called it the city's first multi-storey mall. Payment later shifted from dollars to the Cuban convertible peso and, in 2020, to card payments in moneda libremente convertible (MLC).

== Name ==
The avenue was laid out during the governorship of Miguel Tacón (1834–1838) and was originally called the Paseo Militar or Paseo de Tacón. It became popularly known as Carlos III after a statue of Charles III of Spain was placed at its start, at the junction with Calzada de Belascoaín. It was officially renamed Avenida de la Independencia in 1902 and Avenida Salvador Allende in 1974, but Havana residents still call it Carlos III. Both the 1950s market and the 1997 shopping centre took the avenue's popular name.

== History ==
=== Mercado Carlos III ===
The Mercado de Carlos III occupies the block bounded by Avenida Carlos III and the streets Estrella, Árbol Seco and Pajarito. Its completion and operation were entrusted to Financiera Nacional de Cuba, a non-profit para-statal credit institution, which received the finished building and spent a little over a year fitting it out. Contemporary press reports described four trading floors linked by three elevators and by interior and exterior ramps. Below street level were wholesalers' warehouses, a lorry yard entered from Calle Estrella and a refrigeration plant with twelve cold rooms. The market was to house 200 businesses open 22 hours a day, including 54 fruit stalls, 32 butchers, 30 fishmongers, 15 poultry-and-egg shops, 15 grocery stores and 15 clothing and electrical shops, as well as banks, cafeterias and bookshops. A section was set aside for produce from rural credit associations affiliated with the Banco de Fomento Agrícola e Industrial de Cuba (BANFAIC).

The market was inaugurated at a ceremony attended by an aide representing President Fulgencio Batista, the ministers of commerce, agriculture and labour, and the presidents of the National Bank and BANFAIC. Oscar García Montes, president of Financiera Nacional, said that the market was a public service that should not be run solely for profit, and that rents and prices would be kept reasonable.

According to a 2020 retrospective in OnCuba, the market stood almost opposite the mansion of the businessman Alfredo Hornedo, who held the operating concession of the Mercado Único at Cuatro Caminos, and its opening ended the Mercado Único's dominance of the city's food trade. Residents interviewed in 2020 recalled that before the 1990s the building housed an agricultural market on the ground floor, a fish shop on the first floor and, in the rest of the building, a state enterprise that made teaching aids such as anatomical models.

=== Redevelopment ===
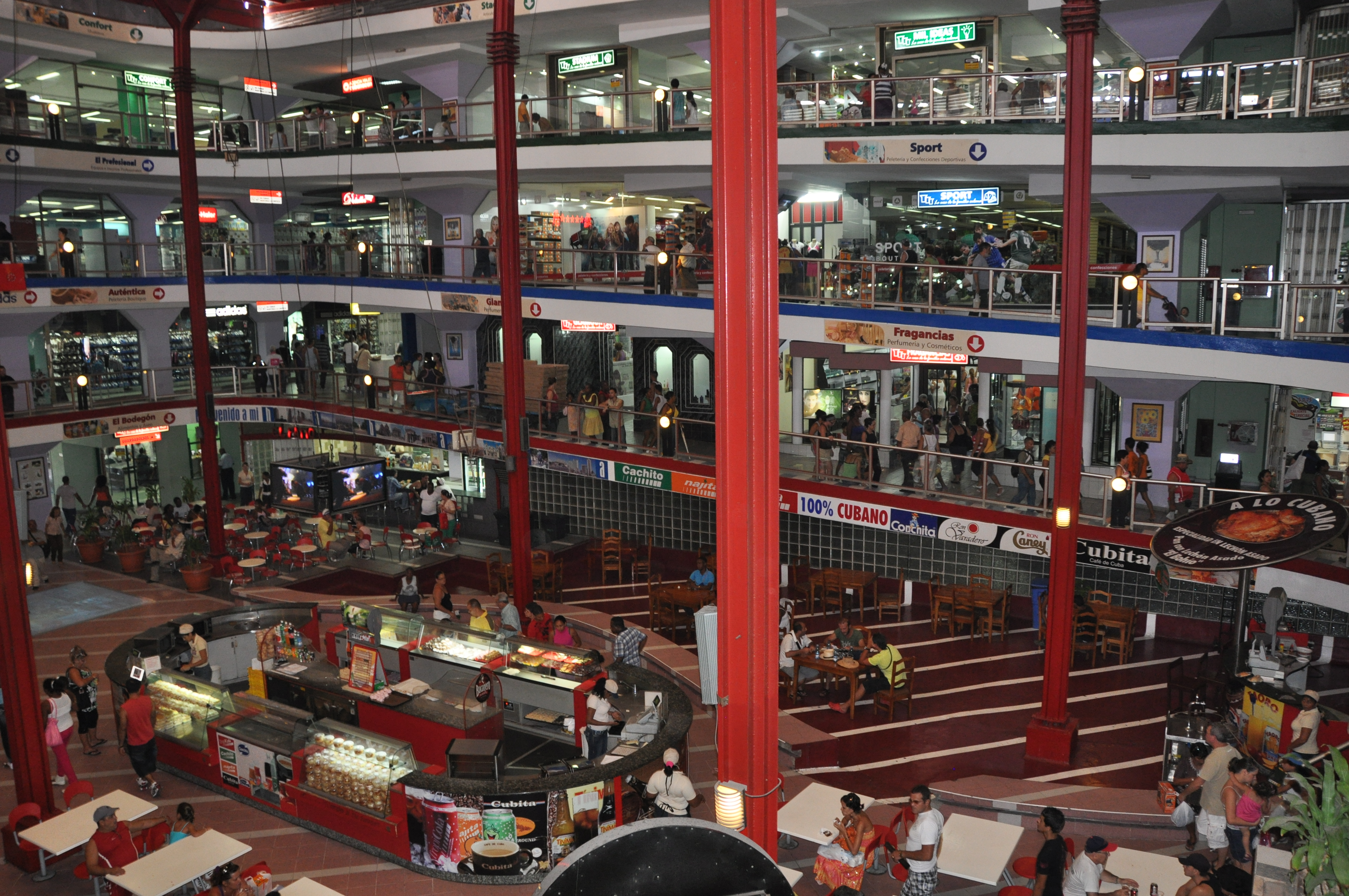
The interior in 2011

CIMEX, a commercial group wholly owned by the Cuban state, rebuilt the property, and it opened as a shopping centre on 17 October 1997. The complex covered about 20,000 square metres (220,000 sq ft) on four levels, and was to have 22 specialized shops within a month, along with restaurants, a bank branch, a video room and parking for 200 cars.

The first businesses included a perfumery, a jeweller, a pizzeria, a Chinese restaurant, an ice-cream parlour, a bar and a well-stocked food market. Sports goods, footwear, clothing, glassware and watches were stocked from both Cuban and foreign suppliers. The centre's commercial manager said it was aimed at the part of the population with access to foreign currency, and the authorities expected takings of US$120,000–150,000 a day. At the time the average Cuban wage was equivalent to between four and fifteen dollars a month, and the correspondent who covered the opening described many visitors who came only to look.

=== Dollar and CUC era ===
Unlike most hard-currency outlets of the period, Carlos III was built for Cubans rather than tourists. The anthropologist Lisa Maya Knauer, who did fieldwork in Centro Habana, described it as the first shopping centre of any kind in a historically inner-city Havana neighbourhood. She found it usually crowded, with people gathering in the ground-floor food court and on the pavement outside, buying scarce necessities such as soap and cooking oil as well as branded clothing and electronics. Going to la shopping, Cuban slang for a hard-currency store, became for many a daily outing and a form of entertainment.

A 2002 report listed a sporting-goods store, an auto-parts shop, a furniture store on the top level and an Adidas outlet. The busiest shop sold everything for one dollar, and its manager sometimes had to lock the doors until the crowd inside thinned. Over the following years the centre also housed an optician, a telephone agency and a Western Union office, as well as cafeterias and children's arcade machines on the ground floor.

Carlos III became the main commercial centre for the Centro Habana barrios of Pueblo Nuevo, Cayo Hueso and Los Sitios, and was nicknamed el palacio del consumo ("the palace of consumption"). Informal vendors and licensed private businesses grew up around it to serve its customers.

=== MLC conversion ===
The centre closed in 2020 during the COVID-19 pandemic in Cuba. For a time it sold goods online through the state platform TuEnvío, until an outbreak of COVID-19 among staff suspended that service as well. During the closure it was refurbished, and it reopened on 12 October 2020 with ten shops selling only in MLC, paid by card from accounts funded in foreign currency. The shops included clothing and sportswear boutiques, a hardware store and an appliance store.

A posted plan called for about twenty shops to reopen through October, but it was withdrawn. Within weeks most of the reopened shops had closed again, leaving only the appliance store and the Western Union office trading. Residents who had relied on the centre for food and toiletries, and who had no access to foreign currency, criticized the change. Commentators noted that it returned Carlos III to the hard-currency model under which it had opened in 1997.

Reports from 2022, after the monetary unification of 2021, described a sharp decline. A CubaNet contributor wrote that most departments sold by card in foreign currency, at appliance prices far above ordinary salaries. He found several units closed and a food market selling in Cuban pesos to local ration-card holders, and reported that the centre, crowded until about 2019, now drew few visitors. Diario de Cuba found the interior nearly deserted while queues formed at the rationed food market behind the building. A shop assistant told the paper that little had sold since the switch to MLC and that the air conditioning was not cooling properly.

== Architecture ==
The building occupies a full block and has an adjoining parking structure. Its four levels are arranged around a central atrium, through which a broad helical ramp rises from the food court on the ground floor, giving views across the whole interior from every level. Ramps linking the floors were already a feature of the original market building.

== Gallery ==
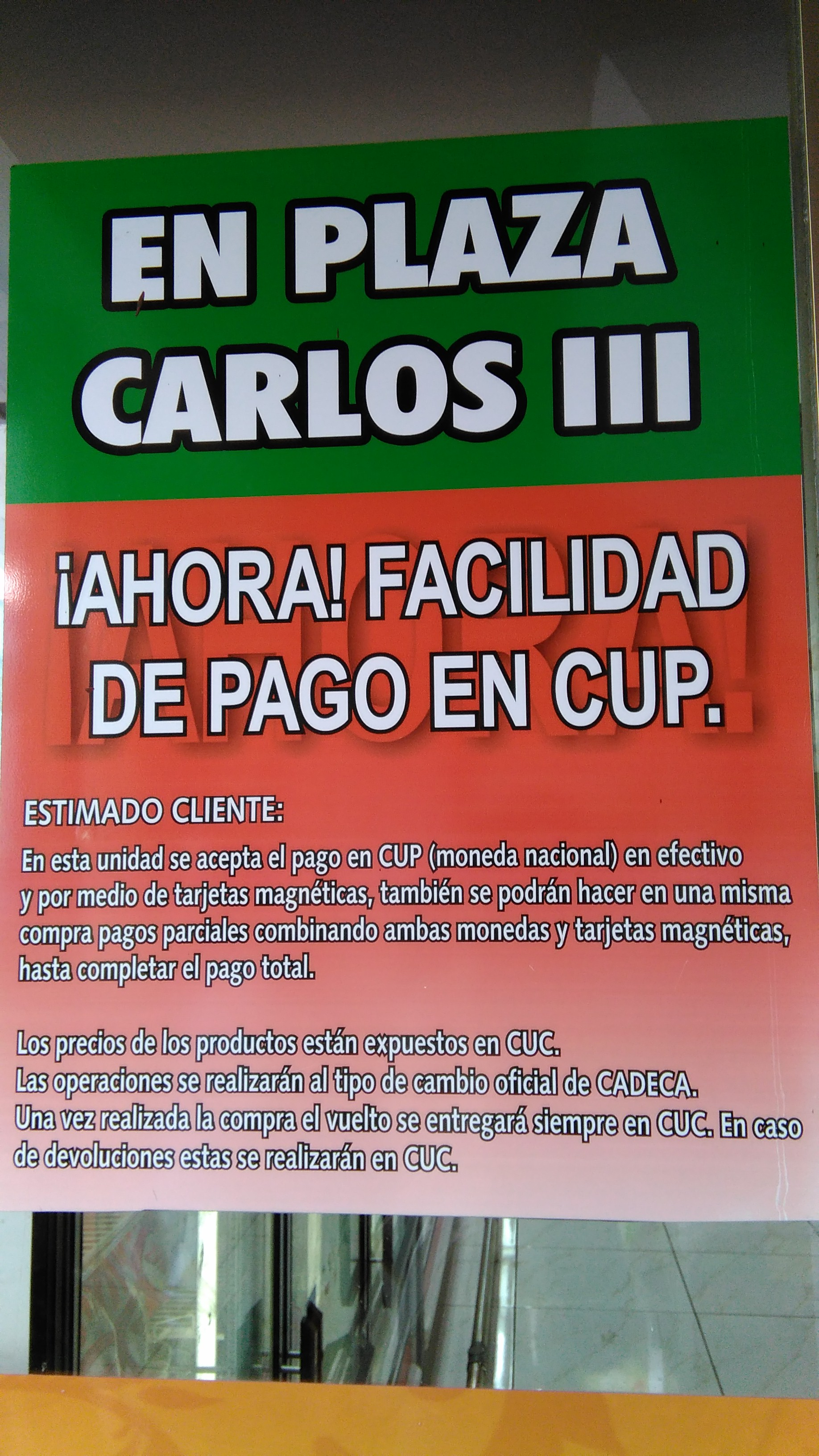
Shopping centre sign, 2016

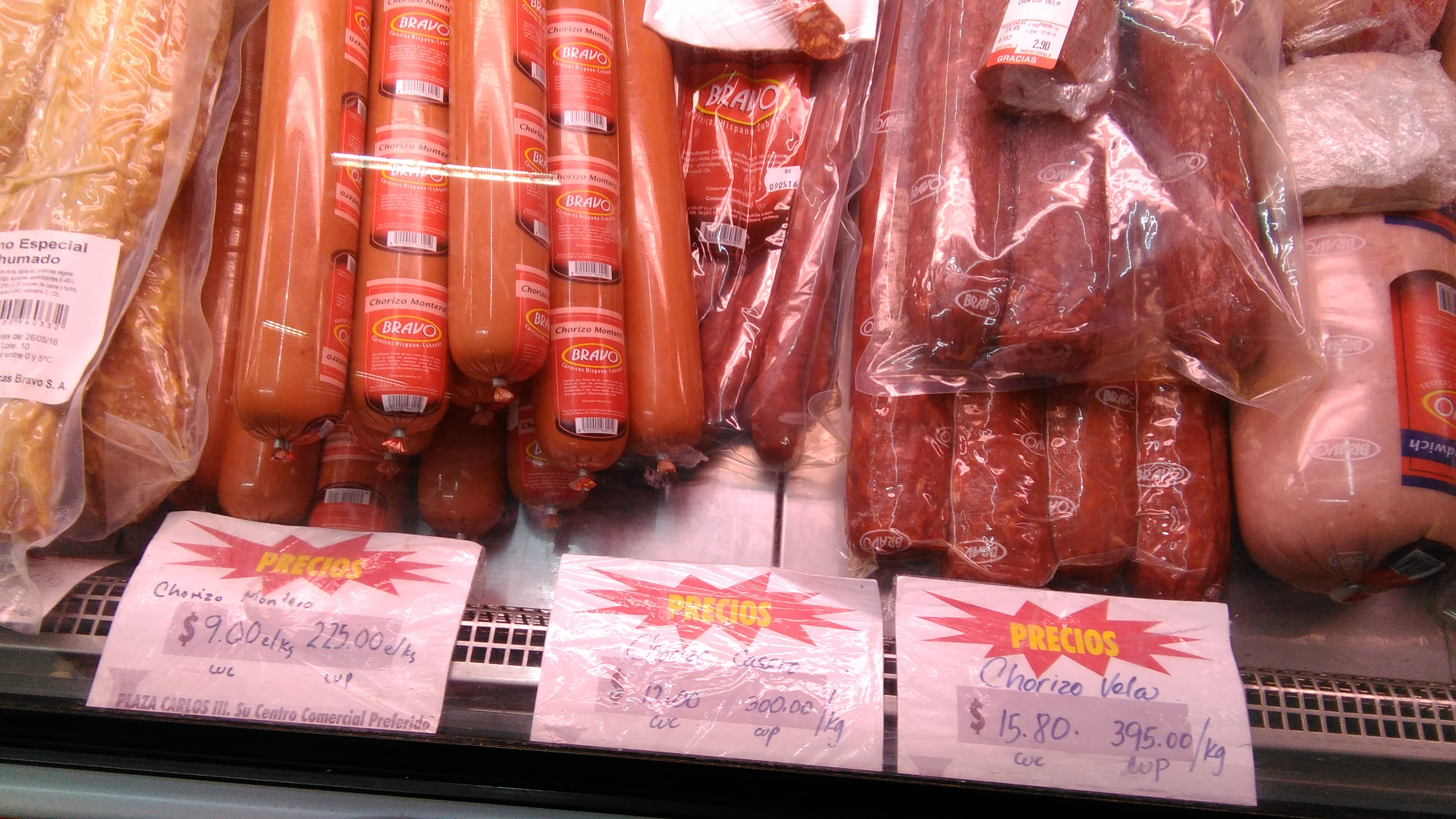
Food counter, 2016

== See also ==
- Special Period
- Cuban convertible peso
