= Raúl Guillermo Rodríguez Castro =

Cuban security official (born c. 1985)

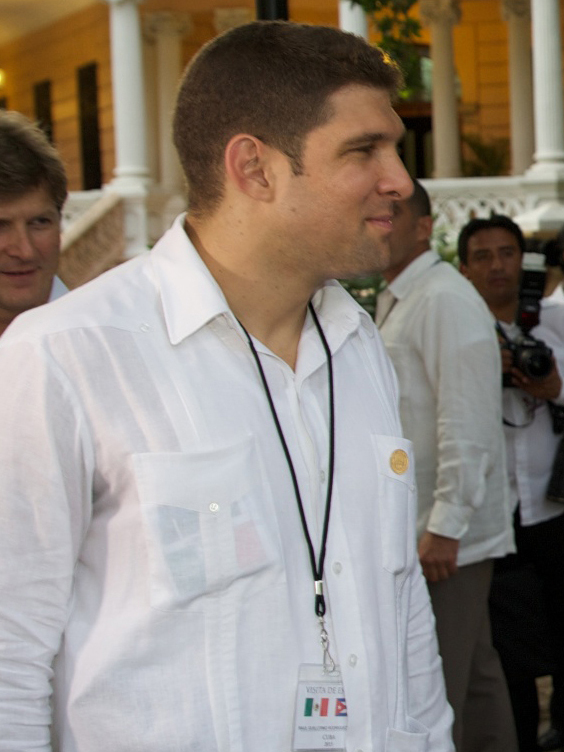
- Rodríguez Castro in 2015
- Born: c. 1985; Cuba
- Other name: El Cangrejo ("The Crab")
- Occupations: Security official, political advisor
- Known for: Chief bodyguard of Raúl Castro; secret diplomatic contacts with US Secretary of State Marco Rubio (2026)
- Relatives: Raúl Castro (maternal grandfather); Déborah Castro Espín (mother); Luis Alberto Rodríguez López-Calleja (father, deceased); Sandro Castro Arteaga (cousin)

Raúl Guillermo Rodríguez Castro (born c. 1985) is a Cuban security official and political advisor. He holds the rank of colonel in the Ministry of the Interior (MININT) and served as the chief of the General Directorate of Personal Security (DGSP), the unit responsible for the protection of former First Secretary of the Communist Party of Cuba Raúl Castro, his maternal grandfather. He is described as a "key figure" (for at least a decade, from 2016) in the inner circle of Cuban politics as well as diplomatic meetings with the United States.

== Family background ==
Rodríguez Castro is the son of Déborah Castro Espín, the eldest daughter of Raúl Castro, and Luis Alberto Rodríguez López-Calleja, a Major General who until his death on 1 July 2022 led GAESA (Grupo de Administración Empresarial S.A.), the Cuban military's vast business conglomerate. GAESA is estimated to control between 30 and 40 percent of Cuba's national economy and nearly 90 percent of the country's retail trade. Through both his maternal and paternal lineage, Rodríguez Castro grew up at the intersection of the Castro political dynasty and the military's economic empire. (Note: Adams and Robles' reporting in The New York Times, 11 August 2026, supports the assertion that GAESA manages much of the Cuban economy and that Rodríguez Castro's father was a powerful figure in its establishment.)

He is considered the favourite grandson of Raúl Castro. His cousin Sandro Castro, grandson of Fidel Castro, has become known internationally as a social media influencer; Rodríguez Castro, by contrast, maintains a deliberately low public profile and does not operate personal social media accounts.

== Nickname ==
Opponents of the Cuban regime use the pejorative nickname El Cangrejo ("The Crab") to refer to Rodríguez. This derives from a physical characteristic: a malformation of one of his fingers. The New York Times reporting, 11 August 2026, cites what a Facebook post from the Central Committee of the Communist Party of Cuba phrased as "character assassination" against Rodríguez Castro, "which was aimed at making the Cuban government appear divided."

== Education and career ==
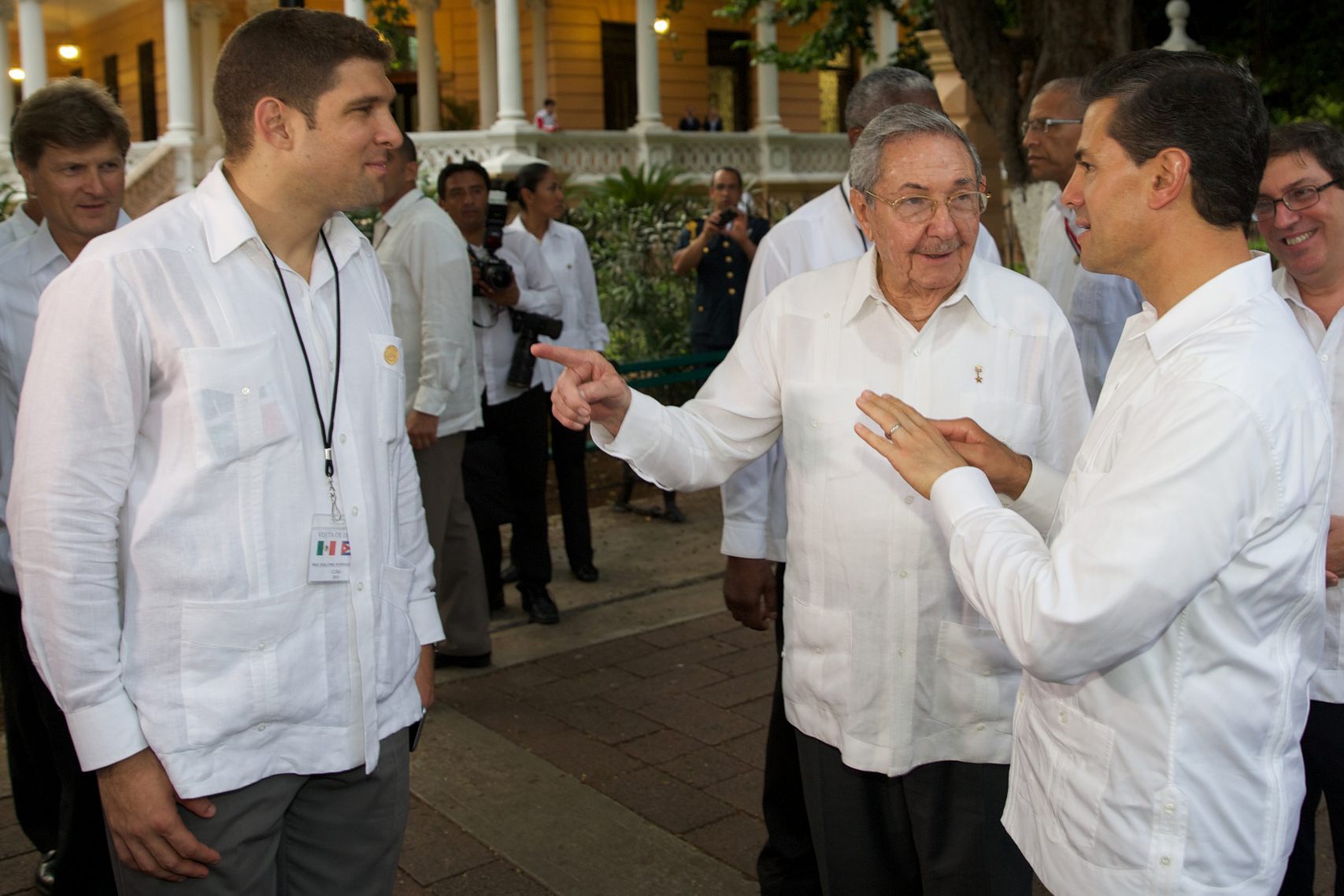
Rodríguez Castro (left) alongside his grandfather Raúl Castro and Enrique Peña Nieto during a Cuban state visit to Mexico in 2015

Rodríguez Castro studied economics at the University of Havana. In 2016, Raúl Castro appointed his grandson as chief of the General Directorate of Personal Security (DGSP), the body responsible for protecting the former first secretary. In this role he controls access to Raúl Castro and serves not only as head of his security detail but also as a close personal advisor on political matters.

Cuban-exile analyst Rolando Cartaya has characterised Rodríguez Castro's function as primarily that of an intermediary: "He is nothing more than a go-between to listen and transmit the orders of his grandfather, Raúl Castro."

== Lifestyle, controversies, and allegations ==
Despite Cuba's severe economic crisis—marked by widespread power outages, food shortages, and extreme poverty—opposition media reports Rodríguez Castro leads an opulent lifestyle. Miami-based Cuban outlets and international press have published photographs of him attending luxury weddings, private concerts, gourmet dinners, and yacht excursions. Arturo Lopez-Levy, a second cousin of Rodríguez Castro and a research associate at the University of Denver, defended his cousin in comments to The New York Times, pointing out that the coverage of his cousin's more "rowdy behavior" was dated more than a decade ago.

=== Panama trips ===
An investigation by the Panamanian newspaper La Prensa, in collaboration with the Venezuelan outlet Armando.Info and the organisations Transparencia Venezuela en el Exilio and the Centro Latinoamericano de Investigación Periodística (CLIP), reported that Rodríguez Castro made at least 13 private trips to Panama in 2024 and at least ten in the first nine months of 2025, travelling aboard a luxury Dassault Falcon 900EX jet registered in San Marino. Some of these visits coincided with significant dates in Panama's political calendar. During a September 2025 visit to Panama's Chiriquí Province, sources cited by La Prensa reported that he spent substantial sums of money shopping and was believed to own property in Coclé Province, though this had not been independently confirmed at the time of publication.

Several of his visits to Panama coincided with the presence of Brigadier General Ania Guillermina Lastres Morera—a member of the National Assembly of People's Power and the Communist Party of Cuba Central Committee—who succeeded Rodríguez Castro's father as the effective head of GAESA after his death in 2022.

=== Gran Azul LLC ===
In July 2025, U.S. Immigration and Customs Enforcement (ICE) arrested Jorge Javier Rodríguez Cabrera in Las Vegas. A former official linked to Cuba's Ministry of Foreign Affairs (MINREX) and a personal acquaintance of Rodríguez Castro, Rodríguez Cabrera had been photographed alongside Raúl Castro and his grandson during the Cuban government's official visit to the United States in 2015. In November 2024, he had registered Gran Azul LLC in Nevada, a company providing door-to-door shipping, logistics, and travel services to Cuba. Independent press described him as "closely tied to El Cangrejo" and alleged that the company functioned as a channel for handling financial flows to Cuba on behalf of the ruling elite. The New York Times reporting on 11 August 2026 said that Mr. Rodríguez Castro had been called a "collaborator" in court records by the two defendants, González Vidal and Reynaldo Crespo Márquez, who pleaded guilty. (González Vidal was sentenced to 25 years in prison, while Crespo Márquez is serving a 20-year sentence.) The same article also said that Rodríguez Castro had come up in another case looked into by the U.S. Justice Department in 2020, though the current Department declined to comment.

=== Alleged property acquisitions ===
According to anonymous sources cited by Havana Times, Rodríguez Castro acquired properties from citizens who had emigrated from Cuba, renovated them using state resources, and subsequently rented them to wealthy foreigners.

=== Yudelky Peña Fonseca case ===
On 23 April 2022, Yudelky Peña Fonseca, a 19-year-old mother, was severely injured in an accident in Mayarí, Holguín Province. Multiple sources reported that the vehicle involved was driven by Rodríguez Castro, while Peña was travelling in a horse-drawn carriage. She subsequently underwent multiple surgeries including the removal of part of her liver, a kidney, and her spleen, and was left with chronic pain and limited mobility. The case received no coverage in Cuba's official state media. She was reported to have received a state pension of approximately 5,000 Cuban pesos per month—insufficient for basic needs, as a single carton of eggs cost nearly 3,000 pesos at the time—and promised nursing care for herself and her children that was reportedly never provided.

== 2026 US–Cuba diplomatic contacts ==
In February 2026, U.S. Secretary of State Marco Rubio held secret meetings with Rodríguez Castro on the sidelines of a Caribbean Community (CARICOM) leaders' summit in Saint Kitts and Nevis. The meetings were later confirmed to have happened (though location was not mentioned) in The New York Times reporting on 11 August 2026, which also stated that Rodríguez Castro met for talks about U.S. sanctions against Cuba with both (albeit separately) Secretary Rubio and the CIA director John Ratcliffe. Rubio declined to publicly confirm the contact; on 25 February 2026, he stated only: "I won't comment on any conversations we've had."

The talks took place in the context of a severe energy crisis in Cuba following a U.S. blockade that halted petroleum shipments to the island, particularly a blockade of Venezuelan oil, which was critical for the island, which was disrupted after the U.S. arrested then-President Nicolás Maduro. First Secretary of the Communist Party of Cuba Miguel Díaz-Canel publicly confirmed on 13 March 2026 that such exchanges had taken place, describing their purpose as finding "solutions through dialogue to the bilateral differences between our two nations."

Analysts characterised Rodríguez Castro's role in the diplomacy as that of a messenger rather than an independent negotiator. Cuban-exile journalist Rolando Cartaya stated: "He is not capable of negotiating. His role is marked by his closeness to his grandfather and his power within the military hierarchy."

== See also ==
- Raúl Castro
- Déborah Castro Espín
- Luis Alberto Rodríguez López-Calleja
- GAESA
- Cuba–United States relations
