= Cuban passport =

Passport issued to citizens of Cuba

Cuban passport; Pasaporte cubano
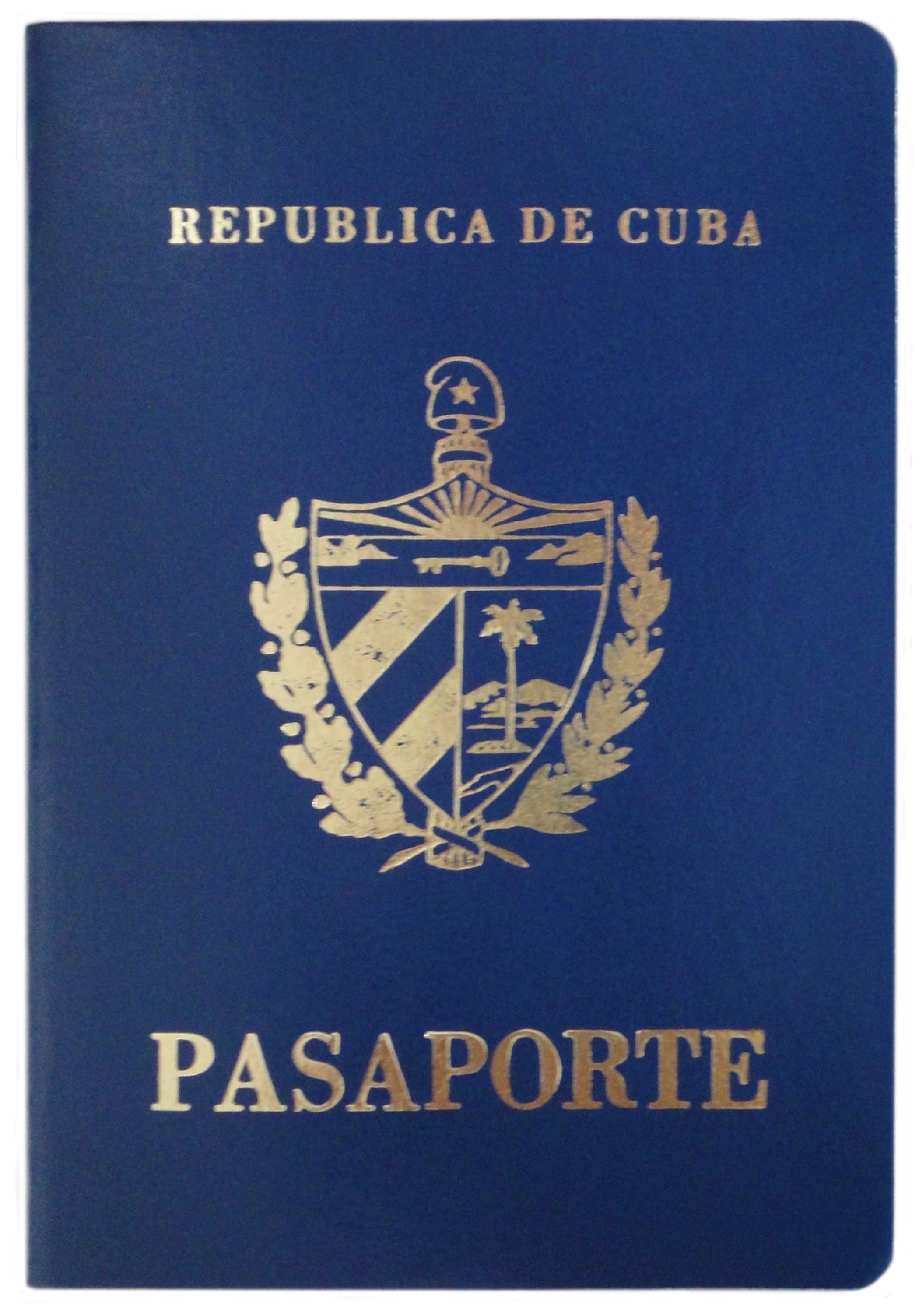
- The front cover of a contemporary Cuban passport.
- Type: Passport
- Issued by: Cuba
- First issued: 1 January 2011 (current version)
- Purpose: Identification
- Eligibility: Cuban citizenship
- Expiration: 10 years

A Cuban passport (Spanish: Pasaporte cubano) is an identity document issued to citizens of Cuba to facilitate international travel. They are valid for 10 years from the date of issuance, before they used to be valid for 6 years and had to be validated every 2 years.

The cost of a Cuban passport is 2500 Cuban pesos, equivalent to approximately US$20.

The cost of issue of this passport is about US$200 (CUC 200) and US$200 for every two years for Cubans living in the United States.

In addition a Cuban national must pay 200 Euros every two years if the person lives outside of Cuba in order to gain permission to enter Cuba. Without this permission and a Cuban passport a Cuban cannot enter the island and will be denied entry.

Until 14 January 2013, the Cuban government required that all Cuban citizens and foreigners such as foreign students that live in Cuba desiring to leave the country would have to obtain an exit permit (Spanish: Permiso de Salida). The abolition of the controversial requirement led to long lines at passport offices filled with citizens desiring to legally travel abroad; however, the lines were partly attributed to the cost of obtaining a passport doubling the next day to the equivalent of US$100 (CUC 100), the equivalent of 5 months of average state salary. Now the passport is the only document required to leave the country, apart from a visa from the destination country. Previously the cost of a passport, exit permit, and associated paperwork added up to around US$300 (CUC 300), the equivalent of 15 months of average state salary.

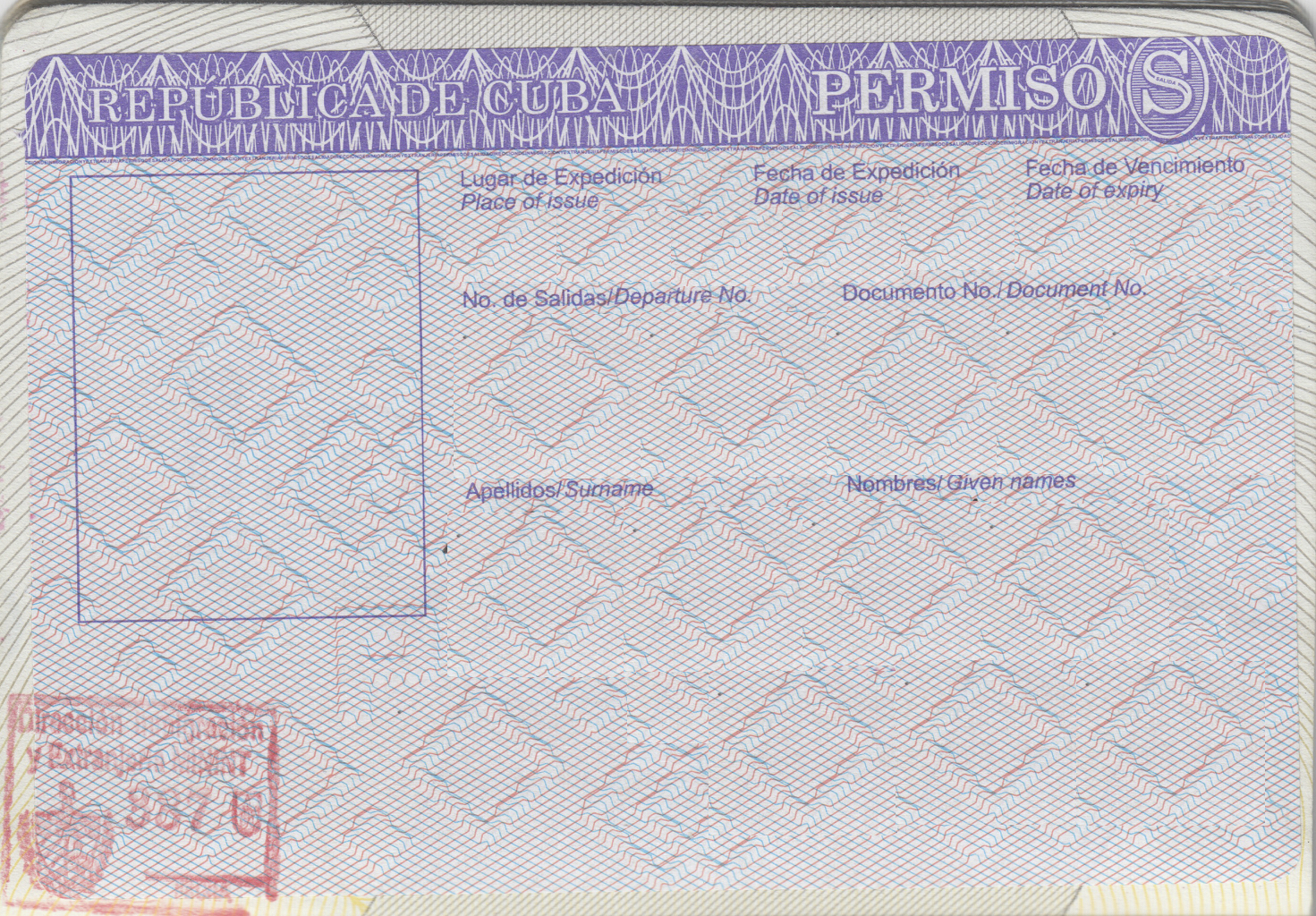
Formerly required exit permit stamped on a Cuban passport

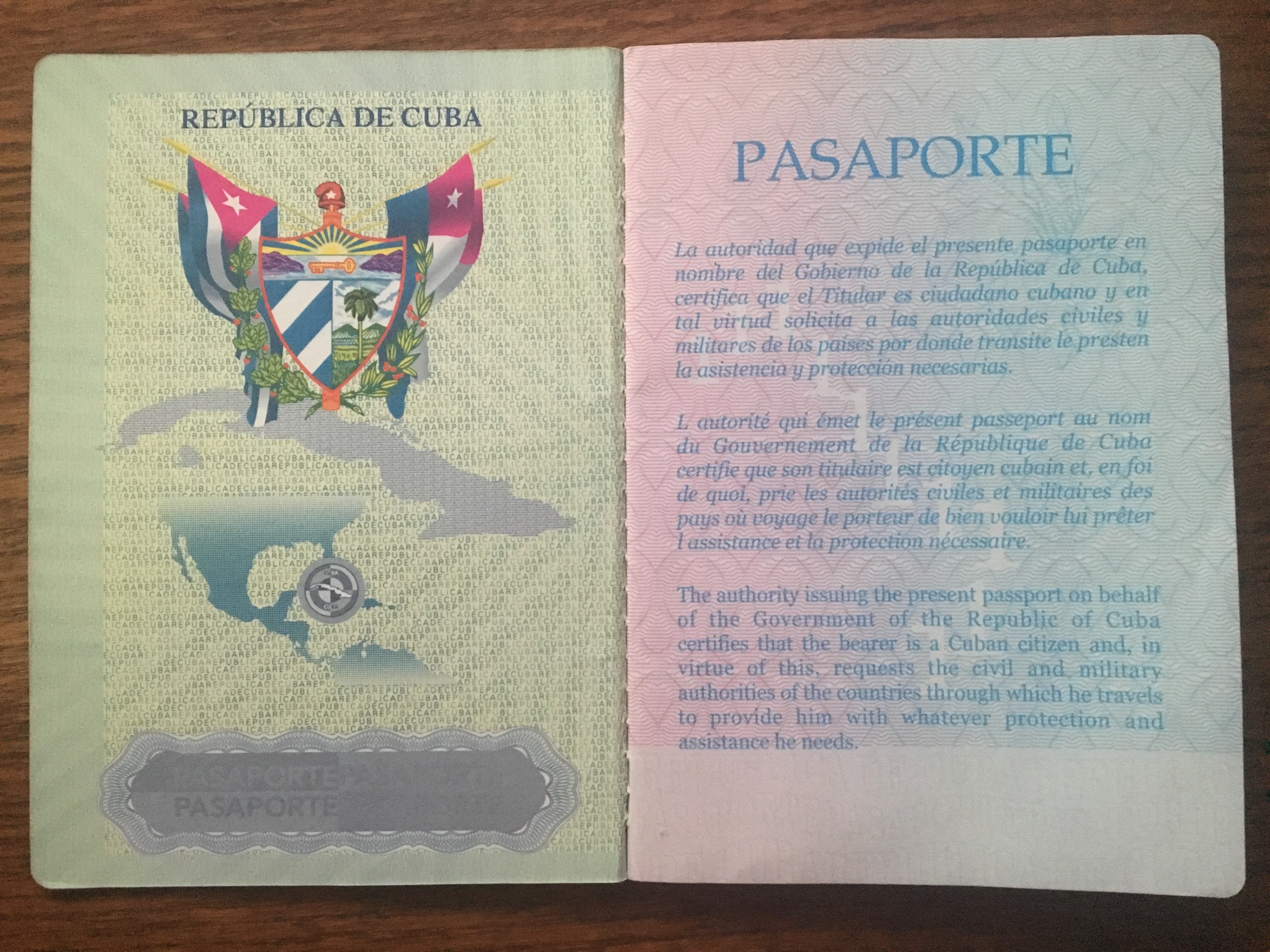
Front endpaper and first page of a Cuban passport

== Passport message ==
Passports of many countries contain a message, nominally from the official who is in charge of passport issuance, addressed to authorities of other countries. The message identifies the bearer as a citizen of the issuing country, requests that he or she be allowed to enter and pass through the other country, and requests further that, when necessary, he or she be given help consistent with international norms. In Cuban passports, the message is in Spanish, French and English. The message is:

in Spanish:

La autoridad que expide el presente pasaporte en nombre del Gobierno de la República de Cuba, certifica que el Titular es ciudadano cubano y en tal virtud solicita a las autoridades civiles y militares de los países por donde transite le presten la asistencia y protección necesarias.

in French:

L'autorité qui émet le présent passeport au nom du Gouvernment de la République de Cuba certifie que son titulaire est citoyen cubain et, en foi de quoi, prie les autorités civiles et militaires des pays où voyage le porteur de bien vouloir lui prêter l'assistance et la protection nécessaire.

and in English:

The authority issuing the present passport on behalf of the Government of the Republic of Cuba certifies that the bearer is a Cuban citizen and, in virtue of this, requests the civil and military authorities of the countries through which he travels to provide him with whatever protection and assistance he needs.

== Security features ==
In addition to coloured fibers in all common pages, Cuban passports feature a UV-reaction-based mark of the Cuban flag and the words República de Cuba (Spanish for Republic of Cuba) on the front endpaper.

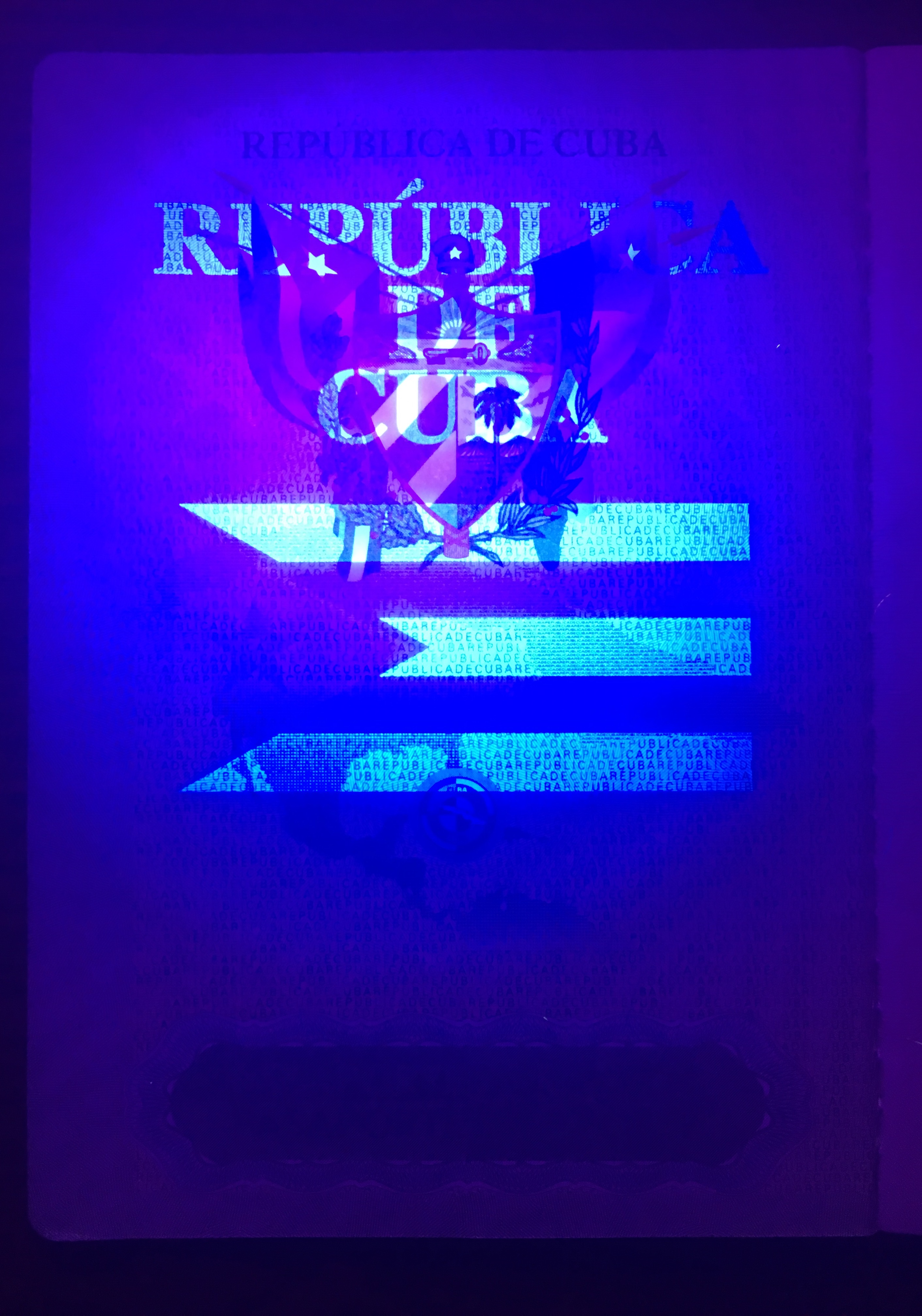
UV reaction of front endpaper

== Visa requirements map ==
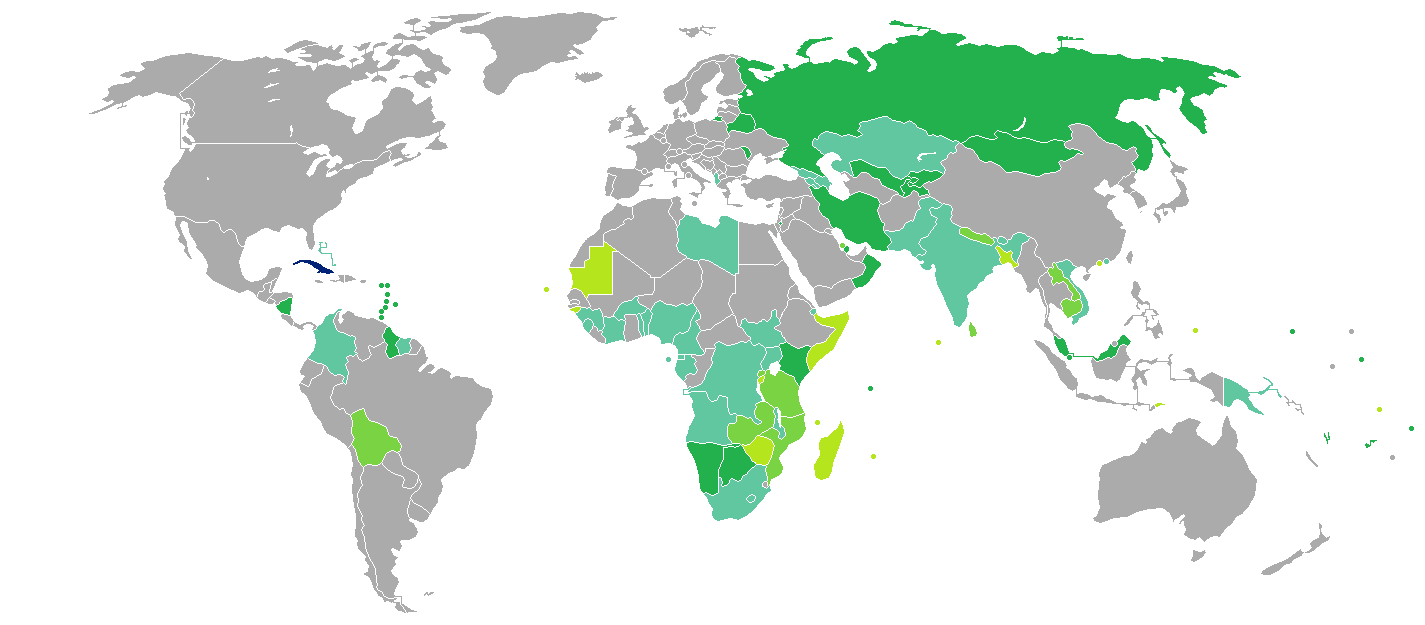
Countries and territories with visa-free or visa-on-arrival entries for holders of regular Cuban passports Cuba Visa free Visa issued upon arrival Electronic authorization or online payment required / eVisa Visa required prior to arrival

As of June 15, 2024, Cuban citizens had visa-free or visa on arrival access to 64 countries and territories, ranking the Cuban passport 79th in terms of travel freedom according to the Henley visa restrictions index.

== See also ==
- Visa requirements for Cuban citizens
- Cuban passport information on PRADO
