= Visa policy of Cuba =

Policy on permits required to enter Cuba

Visitors to Cuba must obtain an e-Visa unless they are citizens from one of the visa-exempt countries or citizens who must obtain a visa from one of the Cuban diplomatic missions.

All visitors, including those with Cuban nationality residing outside Cuba, must hold valid return tickets and proof of medical insurance. Non-Cuban passport holders must also provide proof of financial solvency of at least USD 50 per day.

To enter Cuba, passports must be valid for at least 6 months from the date of arrival.

== Visa policy map ==
Visa policy of Cuba Cuba Visa not required (90 days) Visa not required (60 days) Visa not required (30 days) Visa not required (28 days) eVisa (90 days, extendable for 90 days) Visa required Admission refused

== Cuban nationals ==
Persons who were born in Cuba must use their Cuban passports for travelling to Cuba, unless they have official documentation to prove that they no longer have Cuban nationality.

== Visa exemption ==
=== Ordinary passports ===
Citizens of the following countries may enter Cuba without a visa for the following period:

90 days

- China
- Malaysia
- United Arab Emirates

90 days within any 180 days

- Russia

60 days

- Grenada
- Saint Vincent and the Grenadines

30 days

- Antigua and Barbuda
- Belarus
- Saint Kitts and Nevis
- Saint Lucia
- Singapore

28 days

- Barbados
- Dominica

According to the visa agreement between Benin and Cuba, Beninese students who have an ordinary passport may enter Cuba without a visa for a maximum stay of 90 days. However, this condition is not mentioned on Timatic, which states that all holders of ordinary passports may enter Cuba without a visa for 90 days.

According to visa agreements between Bosnia and Herzegovina, Kenya, Mongolia, Montenegro, Namibia, North Macedonia, Serbia and Cuba, these citizens may enter Cuba without a visa, according to Timatic, but the e-Visa website states that these citizens must apply for an e-Visa. It is not known if amendments to the agreement were subsequently made.

Date of visa changes
- 10 December 1981: Benin
- 29 July 1994: Russia (Note: Previous visa-free agreements under different terms were applied between 1981-1985 and 1985-1994 (as the Soviet Union until 1991). Amendments to the visa agreement have been in force since 21 December 2018.)
- 19 February 1996: Barbados
- 8 July 1997: Saint Vincent and the Grenadines
- 30 March 1998: Saint Kitts and Nevis
- 26 May 1998: Malaysia
- 19 November 1998: Antigua and Barbuda
- 4 February 1999: Grenada
- 10 March 1999: Belarus
- 10 July 2000: Saint Lucia
- 23 October 2001: Dominica
- 31 March 2016: Singapore
- 29 May 2019: United Arab Emirates
- 17 May 2024: China

Cancelled:

- Unknown: Bosnia and Herzegovina, Kenya, Mongolia, Montenegro, Namibia, North Macedonia
- n/a: Liechtenstein and Switzerland
- n/a: Netherlands
- n/a: Belgium
- n/a: United Kingdom
- n/a: Bulgaria
- n/a: Finland
- n/a: Czech Republic and Slovakia (was applied from 22 Nov 1978 as Czechoslovakia)
- 1 December 2015: Ecuador (was applied from 25 Sep 2009)
- 13 April 2023: Serbia (was applied from 19 Nov 1965 as Yugoslavia)

=== Travelling on duty ===
Citizens of the following countries who are holders of ordinary passports are exempt when travelling on duty:

- Nicaragua
- Venezuela

=== Non-ordinary passports ===
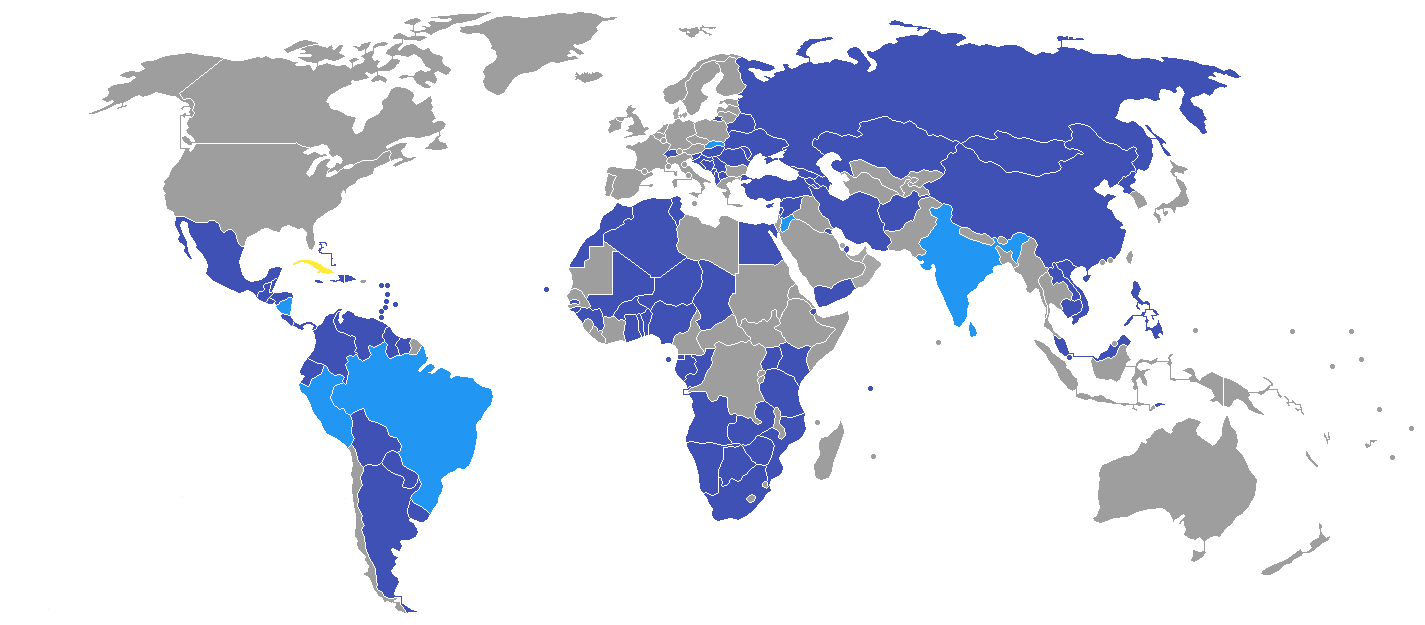
Cuba Diplomatic and official / service passports Diplomatic passports

Holders of diplomatic or various categories of service passports (official, service, special, public affairs) of the following countries may enter and remain in Cuba without a visa for the following period:

Indefinite period

- Afghanistan^{D O S}
- Belize^{D O S}
- Bolivia^{D O}
- Botswana^{D O S}
- Burkina Faso^{D O S}
- Cambodia^{D S}
- China^{D PA S}
- Colombia^{D O^{1}}
- Costa Rica^{D O S}
- Cyprus^{D S}
- Djibouti^{D O S}
- Ecuador^{D O^{1}}
- Gambia^{D S}
- Georgia^{D S}
- Jamaica^{D O}
- Jordan^{D}
- Malaysia^{D O}
- Namibia^{D O S}
- Nicaragua^{D}
- North Korea^{D S}
- Panama^{C D O S Sp}
- Sao Tome and Principe^{D O S}
- Seychelles^{D O S}
- Sri Lanka^{D}
- Suriname^{D O S}
- Switzerland^{D O S}
- Tanzania^{D O S}
- Togo^{D O S}
- Trinidad and Tobago^{D O S}
- Tunisia^{D O S}
- Uganda^{D O S}
- Ukraine^{D S}
- Vietnam^{D O S}
- Yemen^{D O S Sp}
- Zambia^{D O S}
- Zimbabwe^{D O S}

180 days

- Brazil^{D}

90 days

- Albania^{D S}
- Angola^{D S}
- Argentina^{D O S}
- Azerbaijan^{D O S}
- Bahamas^{D O S}
- Bosnia and Herzegovina^{D O}
- Chad^{D S Sp 3}
- Croatia^{D O S}
- Dominican Republic^{D O}
- Egypt^{D O S}
- El Salvador^{D O}
- Equatorial Guinea^{D O S 3}
- Gabon^{D O S}
- Ghana^{D O S 3}
- Guyana^{D O S}
- Haiti^{D O S}
- Honduras^{D O S}
- Hungary^{D S}
- India^{D 3}
- Iran^{D S 3}
- Kenya^{D O S 3}
- Kuwait^{D Sp 2}
- Laos^{D O S}
- Lebanon^{D O S Sp 3}
- Mali^{D O S}
- Mexico^{D O}
- Montenegro^{D O}
- Mozambique^{D O S}
- Nigeria^{D O}
- North Macedonia^{D O}
- Peru^{D}
- Philippines^{D O S}
- Qatar^{D S Sp 3}
- Romania^{D O S 1}
- Russia^{D S 1}
- Serbia^{D O}
- Slovakia^{D 1}
- South Africa^{D O S}
- Syria^{D S Sp 3}
- Timor-Leste^{D S}
- Turkey^{D S Sp}
- United Arab Emirates^{D Sp}
- Uruguay^{D O S}
- Venezuela^{D O S}

3 months

- Algeria^{D S}
- Benin^{D S}
- Guatemala^{C D O S}
- Guinea^{D O S}
- Guinea-Bissau^{D O S}
- Morocco^{D O S Sp}
- Niger^{D S}
- Paraguay^{D O}
- Slovenia^{D S}

60 days

- Grenada^{All}
- Saint Vincent and the Grenadines^{All}

30 days

- Antigua and Barbuda^{All}
- Belarus^{D S}
- Kazakhstan^{D S}
- Mongolia^{D O}
- Saint Kitts and Nevis^{All}
- Saint Lucia^{All}
- Singapore^{D O S}

28 days

- Barbados^{All}
- Dominica^{All}

_{All - All passports}
_{D - Diplomatic passports}
_{O - Official passports}
_{O^{1} - For holders of official passports: 90 days}
_{PA - Passports for public affairs}
_{S - Service passports}
_{Sp - Special passports}
_{1 – 90 days within any 180-day period.}
_{2 – 90 days within any 6-month period.}
_{3 – 90 days within any 1 calendar year.}

According to the Ministry of Foreign Affairs of Cuba, Armenia and Moldova are not applying bilateral agreements in practice.

=== Future changes ===
Cuba has signed visa exemption agreements with the following countries, but they have not yet been ratified:

Country	Passports	Agreement signed on
Rwanda	Diplomatic, official and service	16 September 2023
Burundi	Diplomatic, official and service	14 September 2023
Fiji	Diplomatic and official	27 October 2020
Pakistan	Diplomatic, official and service	30 October 2019

== Electronic visa (e-Visa) ==
Since August 2024, visitors from most countries may obtain an e-Visa for 90 days. Extension is possible for another 90 days.

== Visa required in advance ==
Citizens of the following countries are ineligible to obtain an e-Visa and must obtain a visa in advance:

- Afghanistan
- Bangladesh
- Cameroon
- Eritrea
- Ethiopia
- Ghana
- Guinea
- Haiti
- Iraq
- Kenya
- Nepal
- Nigeria
- Pakistan
- Philippines
- Sierra Leone
- Somalia
- Sri Lanka
- Syria
- Uzbekistan
- Yemen

== Kosovo ==
Entry and transit is refused for Kosovo nationals, even if not leaving the aircraft and proceeding by the same flight.

== See also ==
- Visa requirements for Cuban citizens
