= GAESA =

Cuban military business conglomerate

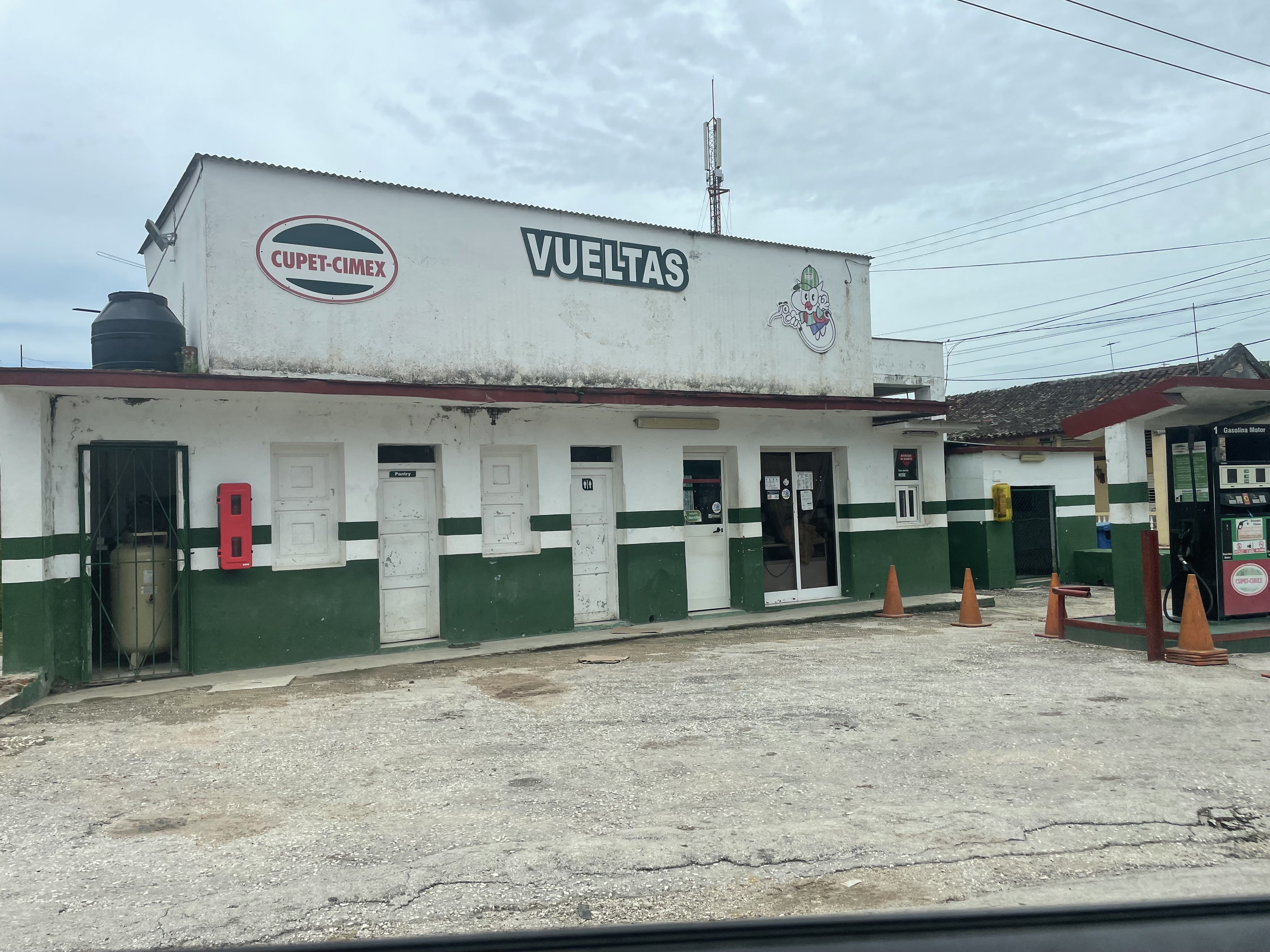
- CUPET-CIMEX petrol station in San Antonio de las Vueltas, Camajuaní, 2023.
- Native name: Grupo de Administración Empresarial S.A.
- Type: Conglomerate
- Founded: 1995
- Founder: Raúl Castro
- Headquarters: Havana, Cuba
- Area served: Cuba
- Brands: CIMEX, Aerogaviota, TRD Caribe, ETECSA, Banco Financiero Internacional, Coppelia, Unión de Industrias Militares
- Owner: Cuban Revolutionary Armed Forces
- Parent: Ministry of the Revolutionary Armed Forces

The Grupo de Administración Empresarial S.A. (GAESA) is a Cuban business megaconglomerate, owned and operated by the Cuban Revolutionary Armed Forces. Among Cuba's "most powerful institutions", it is estimated to control between 40-70% of the Cuban economy, with revenues three times the state budget. However, due to the historic precedent of misinformation campaigns, much of the English language information on GAESA is unverified and from problematic sources.

GAESA consists of dozens of businesses, dealing in everything from hotels and tourism to construction, port logistics, fishing and commercial imports, financial services and retail stores. Contradictory and problematic reports describe it as a financial juggernaut, or being "on the verge of bankruptcy".

GAESA was founded by Raul Castro to give the Cuban military a financial foundation during the Special Period, and was run by the Cuban general Luis Alberto Rodríguez López-Calleja until his death in 2022. Some sources allege GAESA does not allow the Cuban government to audit its accounts.

== Operations and holdings ==
While GAESA does not reveal its financial records, an unconfirmed leak of information from its 2023 and 2024 financial statements was published by El Nuevo Herald in 2025 and provided information. Affiliates include:

- Gaviota (Grupo de Turismo Gaviota S.A.), controls much of Cuba's tourism; Management is mostly done by foreign companies.
- CIMEX - retail trade
- TRD Caribe - wholesale trade,
- RAFIN S.A. and the Banco Financiero Internacional (BFI), control much of the Cuban financial system.

GAESA manages remittance businesses, logistics, and storage. This includes the Port of Mariel. It is involved in construction, transportation, and foreign trade. Because it effectively administers the country's main foreign-currency flows, it is "the most influential economic actor" in Cuba.

=== Financial performance ===
Gross profits on GAESA's sales come to approximately 37% of Cuba's GDP. The conglomerate exported goods and services equivalent to about 34% of the island's total exports in the time studied. GAESA has exclusive control over Cuba's hotel industry, which due to the US sanctions regime has lead to it being the main acquirer of US and Canadian dollars on the Island.

=== Asset valuation ===
The value of its total assets is disputed by experts. According to The Miami Herald, GAESA, acting as a proxy for the Cuban military, has around $18 billion in assets as of August 2025. Another source (The Economist magazine) describes the group as on the verge of bankruptcy as of March 2026. Emily Morris, an economist at the University College London Institute of the Americas, disagreed with the report by the Miami Herald. According to Morris, Cuba's accounting system converts U.S. dollars to Cuban pesos in their accounting documents; this means that the $17.9 billion that was reported would translate to $746 million in U.S. dollars.

== See also ==
- 2026 Cuban crisis
- Miguel Díaz-Canel
