= Manuel Cuesta Morúa =

Cuban historian, essayist, and political activist (born 1962)

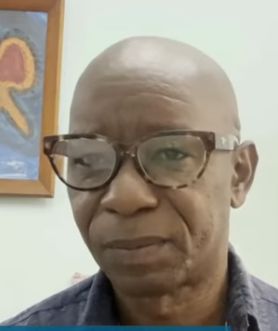
- Born: December 31, 1962 (age 63); Havana, Cuba
- Education: University of Havana
- Occupations: Historian, essayist, political activist
- Organizations: Arco Progresista #Otro18; Council for Democratic Transition in Cuba
- Known for: Cuban opposition and pro-democracy activism
- Political party: Cuban Democratic Socialist Current
- Awards: Ion Rațiu Democracy Award (2016)

Manuel Cuesta Morúa (Havana, December 31, 1962) is a Cuban historian, essayist, and political activist. Since the 1990s, he has participated in organizations and platforms opposed to Cuba's political system and has promoted positions associated with social democracy, human rights, and political reform.

In 2016, he became recipient of the Ion Rațiu Democracy Award, presented by the Woodrow Wilson International Center for Scholars.

== Biography ==
=== Education and early years ===
Cuesta Morúa was born in Havana in 1962 and graduated with a degree in history from the University of Havana in 1986. He subsequently undertook postgraduate studies related to political science, economics, international relations, and anthropology.

Between 1986 and 1991, he worked at cultural institutions in Havana. From 1988 to 1991, he was associated with the Casa de África of the Museum of the City of Old Havana.

=== Early political activities ===
In 1991, he joined the Cuban Democratic Socialist Current, a social-democratic organization. In 1993, he began working with the Cuban Commission for Human Rights and National Reconciliation. In 1996, he was elected secretary general of the Cuban Democratic Socialist Current.

In 1998, he participated in the founding of the Roundtable for Reflection of the Moderate Opposition, which brought together representatives of various opposition organizations. A document published by the Roundtable in 1999 identifies Cuesta Morúa as secretary general of the Cuban Democratic Socialist Current and as the organization's representative.

=== Arco Progresista ===
In 2002, he participated in the founding of Arco Progresista, a social-democratic political organization. He subsequently served as the organization's spokesperson.

In 2004, he publicly advocated a change in the European Union's policy toward Cuba based on dialogue with the Cuban government and contacts with opposition groups. In statements reported by El País, he questioned the effectiveness of the European sanctions imposed up to that point.

In December 2004, he was one of the promoters of the digital magazine Consenso, which was established by several opposition organizations. El País identified him at the time as spokesperson for Arco Progresista.

=== Political activity and human rights ===
Cuesta Morúa has been detained on numerous occasions by Cuban authorities in connection with his political activities. In 2016, the Wilson Center stated that he had been arrested several times for his human rights work and for organizing opposition meetings in Havana.

In January 2014, he was detained in Havana in connection with activities related to the organization of an alternative forum to the summit of the Community of Latin American and Caribbean States (CELAC). He was subsequently subjected to precautionary measures that included a ban on leaving the country.

=== #Otro18 and political reforms ===
In 2016, Cuesta Morúa coordinated the citizen platform #Otro18, which advocated reforms to Cuban electoral legislation.

The Wilson Center also noted that he had organized more than 300 roundtable discussions on the possibility of a new constitution for Cuba.

In March 2016, he participated in a meeting between U.S. President Barack Obama and representatives of Cuban civil society and the opposition during Obama's visit to Havana.

=== Ion Rațiu Democracy Award ===
In November 2016, the Woodrow Wilson International Center for Scholars announced that Cuesta Morúa had been selected as the recipient of the Ion Rațiu Democracy Award. The award recognized his activities promoting democracy in Cuba.

The award included a one-month research residency in Washington, D.C., and participation in Wilson Center activities related to democracy.

=== Intellectual activity ===
Cuesta Morúa has published articles and essays on Cuban politics, democracy, human rights, and social democracy. His writings have appeared in media outlets and publications in Cuba and other countries. In 2015, CADAL published a compilation of his writings under the title Ensayos progresistas desde Cuba: Los escritos que el régimen consideraba un atentado contra la paz internacional, bringing together writings produced between 1997 and 2014.

=== Council for Democratic Transition in Cuba ===
In February 2026, Cuesta Morúa was elected president of the Council for Democratic Transition in Cuba (CDTC), a platform bringing together various Cuban opposition organizations and figures.

In June 2026, he was detained again in Havana after going to a police station with activist María Mercedes Benítez, following a summons from the authorities. EFE reported that the reason for the detention and his whereabouts were initially unknown.The opposition organization denounced that "police officers kidnapped and tortured its leader, Manuel Cuesta Morúa".

== Controversies ==
The biographical profile of Manuel Cuesta Morúa published by EcuRed, a Cuban digital encyclopedia linked to the Government of Cuba, presents a markedly negative assessment of his political activities. The text describes him as an opponent of the Cuban government and questions the source of funding for his political activities. In this context, EcuRed characterizes him as a "mercenary" and links him to opposition organizations funded from abroad.

== Publications ==
- Ensayos progresistas desde Cuba: Los escritos que el régimen consideraba un atentado contra la paz internacional. Buenos Aires: CADAL, 2015.

== Awards and recognition ==
- Ion Rațiu Democracy Award (2016).

== See also ==
- Cuban dissident movement
- Cuban opposition
- Human rights in Cuba
- Arco Progresista
- #Otro18
- Council for Democratic Transition in Cuba
- Social democracy
