= Arco Progresista =

Cuban political alliance

Arco Progresista is Cuban umbrella political group including some social-democratic organizations in Cuba, mainly:

- Cuban Arco Progresista (Social-Democratic) Party: The Cuban Arco Progresista Party (Spanish: Partido Arco Progresista) is a Social-Democrat political party founded in Cuba on July 20, 2009. The party has a previous history of civil resistance. It was conformed by the Cuban Democratic Socialist Current (Corriente Socialista Democrática de Cuba), People's Party (Partido del Pueblo), other Cubans trends social democrats (from the island) that aims to contribute content to the social and democratic nation draft. One of the biggest challenges it faces is that of a new national project inclusive.
- Social Democratic Co-ordination of Cuba (Coordinadora Social Demócrata de Cuba): They understand the social democracy as an open project, necessarily incomplete, that is to go slowly in defining the context of a broad dialogue with society as a whole and very specific circumstances: "We suffer from a healthy skepticism. We do not believe or enlightened vanguards or invisible hands, let alone surround projects imposed from above. We imperfect human construction, but we are not willing to compromise with injustice and arbitrariness. We know that what does not occur can not be distributed, but we are not unaware that without full participation there is no guarantee of equity in the distribution. We believe that the social ideal is still relevant because they have not gone the causes of inequality"
- People's Party (Partido del Pueblo): They "see as critical to our historical process hegemony within civil society debate of ideas, intents and purposes over the interests and diversity of proposals, what contributes to its richness, within a single space for the nation and society at a time. 1959's Revolution freezes the social debate. The Cuban Revolution with its attendant double expectations and frustration seized the anxious questions and monopolized all possible answers to the needs of cultural activity, political and social. The Cuban Democratic Socialists want to return to the rational basis of the discussion of ideas."

In February 2022, the group condemned the Russian invasion of Ukraine.
