= CIMEX =

State-owned conglomerate in Cuba

- Native name: Corporación CIMEX S.A.
- Company type: State-owned enterprise
- Founded: 1978
- Headquarters: Havana, Cuba
- Key people: Héctor Oroza Busutil (president)
- Services: Import–export; Banking; Tourism
- Revenue: $1.3 billion (2006)
- Number of employees: 25,000 (2006)
- Website: www.cimex.cu

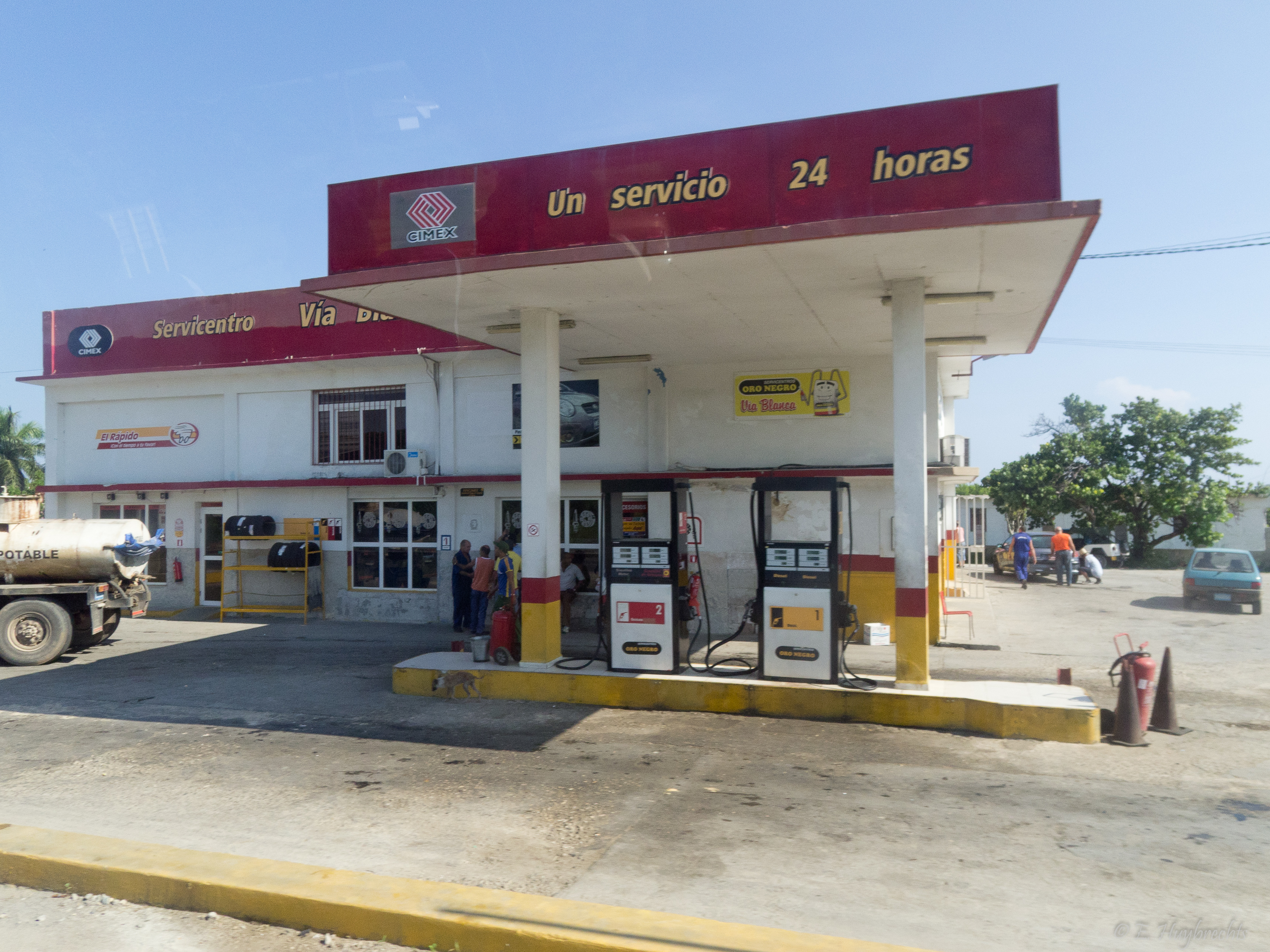
A CIMEX-branded gas station in Santa Cruz del Norte.

Corporación CIMEX S.A. (from Spanish: Comercio Interior, Mercado External for "Domestic Business, External Market") is a state-owned conglomerate in Cuba involved in the import and export of goods, as well as tourism and banking. It has been called Cuba's largest commercial operation, and is headed by Colonel Héctor Oroza Busutil. It has since been absorbed by the military consortium GAESA.

== Operations ==
CIMEX operates outside the socialist norms of Cuba's economy and serves to earn hard currency through profit-seeking investments – often through tourism or other industries that serve the monied Cuban diaspora in Miami and beyond.

Little is known about the exact nature of the company's operations. One scholar noted that "because state agencies and joint ventures do not publish annual reports, the logic behind the organization of CIMEX is unclear." Others have called it "an octopus of many tentacles" due to its diverse holdings.

The company operates the Banco Financiera International, one of top three most-important banks in the country, and the Banco de Inversiones. Both banks have been accused of being involved in money laundering for drug trafficking activities. CIMEX also operates more than 100 Western Union outlets in Cuba.

In the tourism sector CIMEX encompasses Havanatur, the oldest and largest travel agency in Cuba, Havanauto, the largest car rental agency, as well as businesses supporting various hotels and resorts. With this reach across the tourism and financial sectors, CIMEX maintains a monopoly on travel and wire transfers between Cuba and the United States.

CIMEX is also in charge of exporting domestically-produced goods such as rum, coffee, cigars, apparel, ice cream, perfume, jewelry soda and fruit juice. Among the most well-known of its dozens of subsidiaries is Kave Coffee. On the Island itself, CIMEX operates Panamericanas general stores, Servi-Cupet gas stations and other retail outlets. The company has pledged to crack down on staff marking up products for personal profit at its 1,300 stores around the island.

== History ==
CIMEX was founded by the Cuban Ministry of the Interior in 1978 in Panama to circumvent United States sanctions. It also established operations in Mexico, Spain and Florida. Beyond Latin America and Europe, CIMEX also oversees some businesses as far away as Liberia and Japan. Headquartered in Havana, it is also the first domestic Sociedad Anónima.

In the first decades of its existence, CIMEX was headed by military commanders chosen by Fidel Castro. One former president of the company, Eduardo Bencomo Zurdos, was a doctor for and personal friend of Castro. Other employees were typically recruited from the armed forces, the Ministry of the Interior, or the Young Communist League and reportedly required three recommendations from those loyal to the government. In 2010, after Castro's illness, CIMEX was absorbed into the military consortium GAESA.

In 2003, the company reportedly generated $950 million in revenue. By 2006, as tourism and remittances both increased, this grew to $1.3 billion.
