= 6th Central Committee of the Communist Party of Cuba =

Government body elected in 2011

The 6th Central Committee of the Communist Party of Cuba (CPC) was elected at the 6th CPC Congress in 2011.

== Members ==
Name	5th CC	7th CC	Gender
Misleydi Abad Modey	New	Reelected	Female
Onelio Mariano Aguilera Bermúdez	New	Reelected	Male
Liudmila Álamo Dueñas	New	Reelected	Female
Ricardo Alarcón de Quesada	Old	Retired	Male
Rolando Alfonso Borges	Old	Not	Male
Carmen Elsa Alfonso Oceguera	New	Reelected	Female
Abelardo Alvarez Gil	Old	Reelected	Male
Celis Álvarez Oliva	New	Not	Female
Teresa María Amarelle Boué	New	Reelected	Female
Leonardo Andollo Valdés	Old	Reelected	Male
Regla Angulo Pardo	New	Reelected	Female
Mayra Arevich Marín	New	Reelected	Female
José Ramón Balaguer Cabrera	Old	Reelected	Male
Miguel Barnet Lanza	New	Reelected	Male
Sixto Batista Santana	Old	Not	Male
Gladys Bejerano Portela	New	Reelected	Female
Aida Rosa Brown Ramírez	New	Not	Female
Lidia Esther Brunet Nodarse	New	Not	Female
Ana Bueno Guzmán	New	Not	Female
Miguel Mario Cabrera Castellanos	New	Reelected	Male
Julio Camacho Aguilera	Old	Reelected	Male
Alina Belkis Cárdenas Díaz	New	Not	Female
Arairis Cardoso Figueredo	New	Not	Male
José Antonio Carrillo Gómez	Old	Reelected	Male
Julio Casas Regueiro	Old	Reelected	Male
Rosa Amalia Castillo Salazar	New	Not	Female
Raúl Castro Ruz	Old	Reelected	Male
Inés María Chapman Waugh	New	Reelected	Female
Faure Chomón Mediavilla	Old	Not	Male
Leopoldo Cintra Fries	Old	Reelected	Male
Oneida Ciprián Lazaga	New	Not	Female
Marcia Cobas Ruiz	New	Reelected	Female
Gustavo Cobreiro Suárez	New	Not	Male
Abelardo Colomé Ibarra	Old	Retired	Male
María del Carmen Concepción González	Old	Reelected	Female
Jaime A. Crombet Hernández-Baquero	Old	Not	Male
Jorge Cuevas Ramos	Old	Reelected	Male
Yanina de la Nuez Aclich	New	Reelected	Female
Miguel Díaz-Canel Bermúdez	Old	Reelected	Male
Caridad del Rosario Diego Bello	Old	Reelected	Male
Misael Enamorado Dáger	Old	Not	Male
Ramón Espinosa Martín	Old	Reelected	Male
Lázaro Fernando Expósito Canto	Old	Reelected	Male
José Ramón Fernández Álvarez	Old	Reelected	Male
Marcia Fernández Andreu	New	Reelected	Female
Carlos Fernández Gondín	Old	Reelected	Male
Yolanda Ferrer Gómez	Old	Not	Female
Julio César Gandarilla Bermejo	New	Reelected	Male
Yamilet García Fernández	New	Not	Female
Guillermo García Frías	Old	Reelected	Male
Julio César García Rodríguez	New	Reelected	Male
Victor Fidel Gaute Lopez	Old	Reelected	Male
Sarah Yadira Gázquez Camejo	New	Not	Female
Yolexis Guerra Gómez	New	Not	Male
Jorge Luis Guerrero Almaguer	New	Not	Male
Ulises Guilarte De Nacimiento	New	Reelected	Male
Armando Hart Dávalos	Old	Reelected	Male
Melba Hernández Rodríguez del Rey	Old	Not	Female
Olga Lidia Jones Morrinson	New	Not	Female
Annia Ladrón de Guevara Casals	New	Not	Female
Juan Esteban Lazo Hernández	Old	Reelected	Male
Eusebio Leal Spengler	Old	Reelected	Male
Tania León Silveira	New	Reelected	Female
Lázara Mercedes López Acea	Old	Reelected	Female
Roberto López Hernández	New	Reelected	Male
Álvaro López Miera	Old	Reelected	Male
Orlando Lugo Fonte	Old	Not	Male
Antonio Enrique Lussón Batlle	New	Reelected	Male
José Ramón Machado Ventura	Old	Reelected	Male
Rodrigo Malmierca Díaz	New	Reelected	Male
Ana María Mari Machado	New	Reelected	Female
Rubén Martínez Puente	Old	Not	Male
Zoraida Medina Font	New	Not	Female
Ernesto Medina Villaveirán	New	Reelected	Male
José Julián Milián Pino	Old	Not	Male
José Miyar Barruecos	Old	Not	Male
José Ramón Monteagudo Ruiz	New	Reelected	Male
Lucio Morales Abad	New	Not	Male
Roberto Tomás Morales Ojeda	New	Reelected	Male
Miosotys Moreno Delgado	New	Reelected	Male
Marino Murillo Jorge	New	Reelected	Male
Miladys Orraca Castillo	New	Reelected	Female
Ramón Pardo Guerra	Old	Reelected	Male
Nayla Patterson Prieto	New	Not	Female
Lina Olinda Pedraza Rodríguez	Old	Reelected	Female
Yamila Peña Ojeda	New	Reelected	Female
Santiago Pérez Castellanos	Old	Not	Male
Sonia Virgen Pérez Mojena	New	Not	Female
Elba Rosa Pérez Montoya	Old	Reelected	Female
Joaquín Quintas Solá	Old	Reelected	Male
Iris Quiñones Rojas	New	Reelected	Female
Olga Lidia Ramírez González	New	Not	Female
Esperanza Recio Socarrás	New	Not	Female
José Amado Ricardo Guerra	New	Reelected	Male
Jorge Risquet Valdés-Saldaña	Old	Not	Male
Samuel Carlos Rodiles Planas	Old	Reelected	Male
Yudí Rodríguez Hernández	New	Reelected	Female
Raúl Cirilo Rodríguez Lobaina	New	Reelected	Male
Luis Alberto Rodríguez López-Calleja	New	Reelected	Male
Adolfo Rodríguez Nodals	Old	Not	Male
Bruno Eduardo Rodríguez Parrilla	Old	Reelected	Male
Ramón Antonio Romero Pérez	Old	Not	Male
Liz Belkis Rosabal Ponce	New	Reelected	Female
Ulises Rosales del Toro	Old	Reelected	Male
Omar Fernando Ruiz Martín	New	Reelected	Male
Romárico Sotomayor García	New	Reelected	Male
Bárbara Tandrón Negrín	New	Not	Female
Jorge Luis Tapia Fonseca	New	Reelected	Male
Olga Lidia Tapia Iglesias	New	Reelected	Female
Luis Antonio Torres Iríbar	New	Reelected	Male
Ramiro Valdés Menéndez	Old	Reelected	Male
Salvador Valdés Mesa	Old	Reelected	Male
Alina Vicente Gaínza	New	Reelected	Female
Josefina de la Caridad Vidal Ferreiro	New	Reelected	Female
Adel Onofre Yzquierdo Rodríguez	New	Reelected	Male
