= 7th Central Committee of the Communist Party of Cuba =

Government body elected in 2016

The 7th Central Committee of the Communist Party of Cuba (CPC) was elected at the 7th CPC Congress in 2016. It was composed of 142 members of which 44.37% were women and 35.92% of members were black or mixed race.

== Members ==
Name	6th CC	8th CC	Gender
Misleydi Abad Modey	Old	Retired	Female
Homero Acosta Álvarez	New	Reelected	Male
Onelio Mariano Aguilera Bermúdez	Old	Retired	Male
Carmen Elsa Alfonso Oceguera	Old	Retired	Female
Abelardo Álvarez Gil	Old	Retired	Male
Teresa María Amarelle Boué	Old	Reelected	Female
Leonardo Ramón Andollo Valdés	Old	Retired	Male
Regla Luz Angulo Pardo	Old	Retired	Female
Mayra Arevich Marín	Old	Reelected	Female
Marta Ayala Ávila	New	Reelected	Female
José Ramón Balaguer Cabrera	Old	Retired	Male
Miguel Ángel Barnet Lanza	Old	Retired	Male
Gladys María Bejerano Portela	Old	Reelected	Female
Yuri Belén Ramírez	New	Reelected	Female
Carlos Borrero Cos	New	Not	Male
Jorge Luis Broche Lorenzo	New	Reelected	Male
Lydia Esther Brunet-Nodarse	New	Not	Female
Miguel Mario Cabrera Castellanos	Old	Retired	Male
Mayté Cabrera Hernández	New	Not	Female
Julio Camacho Aguilera	Old	Retired	Male
Julio Cárdenas Abreu	New	Retired	Male
José Antonio Carrillo Gómez	Old	Retired	Male
Raúl Castro Ruz	Old	Retired	Male
Inés María Chapman Waugh	Old	Reelected	Female
Faure Chomón Mediavilla	Old	Reelected	Female
Leopoldo Cintra Frías	Old	Retired	Male
Marcia Cobas Ruiz	Old	Retired	Female
María del Carmen Concepción González	Old	Retired	Female
Zaida Correa Gutiérrez	New	Not	Female
Yuniasky Crespo Baquero	New	Reelected	Female
Bolivia Tamara Cruz Martínez	New	Reelected	Female
Jorge Cuevas Ramos	Old	Retired	Male
Yanina de la Nuez Aclich	Old	Reelected	Female
Miguel Díaz-Canel Bermúdez	Old	Reelected	Male
Caridad del Rosario Diego Bello	Old	Reelected	Female
Félix Duarte Ortega	New	Reelected	Male
Ramón Espinosa Martín	Old	Retired	Male
Lázaro Fernando Expósito Canto	Old	Reelected	Male
José Ramón Fernández Álvarez	Old	Retired	Male
Marcia Fernández Andreu	Old	Reelected	Female
Carlos Fernández Gondín	Old	Retired	Male
Marisol Fuentes Ferrer	New	Reelected	Female
Julio César Gandarilla Bermejo	Old	Retired	Male
Juan Miguel García Díaz	Old	Retired	Male
Guillermo García Frías	Old	Retired	Male
Julio César García Rodríguez	Old	Reelected	Male
Iraimis García Sánchez	New	Not	Male
Reinaldo García Zapata	New	Not	Male
Víctor Fidel Gaute López	Old	Retired	Male
José Alberto González Sánchez	New	Reelected	Male
Yixi María Guerrero Pupo	New	Not	Female
Sulema Guevara Aguilar	New	Not	Female
Ulises Guilarte de Nacimiento	Old	Reelected	Male
Armando Hart Dávalos	Old	Retired	Male
Federico Hernández Hernández	New	Reelected	Male
Yanet Hernández Pérez	New	Reelected	Female
Lixandre Hernández Viera	New	Not	Male
Yamilka Jaque Flores	New	Not	Female
Beatriz Jhonson Urrutia	New	Not	Female
Juan Esteban Lazo Hernández	Old	Reelected	Male
Eusebio Leal Spengler	Old	Retired	Male
Denny Legrá Azahares	New	Not	Male
Tania León Silveira	Old	Retired	Female
Julio Ramiro Lima Corzo	New	Not	Male
Lázara Mercedes López Acea	Old	Retired	Female
Roberto López Hernández	Old	Reelected	Male
Álvaro López Miera	Old	Reelected	Male
Antonio Enrique Lussón Batlle	Old	Retired	Male
José Ramón Machado Ventura	Old	Retired	Male
Edina de la Caridad Madan Herrera	New	Not	Female
Tasman Mairs Santiesteban	New	Not	Male
Rodrigo Malmierca Díaz	Old	Retired	Male
Miriam Marbán González	New	Reelected	Female
Ana María Mari Machado	Old	Reelected	Female
Arelis Marrero Guerrero	New	Reelected	Female
María Jesús Martínez Martínez	New	Not	Female
María Jesús Martínez Martínez	New	Not	Female
Gladys Martínez Verdecia	New	Retired	Male
Jorge Luis Méndez de la Fé	New	Not	Male
Yusleidys Menéndez Seijo	New	Reelected	Female
Carlos Rafael Miranda Martínez	New	Not	Male
José Ramón Monteagudo Ruiz	Old	Reelected	Male
Roberto Tomás Morales Ojeda	Old	Reelected	Male
Bárbara Miosotys Moreno Delgado	Old	Retired	Female
Susely Morfa González	New	Reelected	Female
Dallimy Muñoz Rodríguez	New	Not	Male
Marino Murillo Jorge	Old	Retired	Male
Anabel Naranjo Paz	New	Reelected	Female
Miriam Nicado García	New	Reelected	Female
Miladys Orraca Castillo	Old	Reelected	Female
Gladys Esther Palazón Herrera	New	Not	Female
Ramón Pardo Guerra	New	Not	Male
Lina Olinda Pedraza Rodríguez	Old	Retired	Female
Yamila Peña Ojeda	Old	Reelected	Female
Rosario del Pilar Pentón Díaz	New	Reelected	Female
Santiago Pérez Castellanos	Old	Reelected	Male
Rafael Pérez Fernández	New	Reelected	Male
Elba Rosa Pérez Montoya	Old	Reelected	Female
Yaisel Osvaldo Pieter Terry	New	Reelected	Male
Francisco Pol Fiz	New	Not	Male
Rogelio Polanco Fuentes	New	Reelected	Male
José Ángel Portal Miranda	New	Reelected	Male
Joel Queipo Ruiz	New	Reelected	Male
Iris Quiñones Rojas	Old	Retired	Female
Joaquín Quintas Solá	Old	Retired	Male
Omar Ramírez Mendoza	New	Reelected	Male
José Amado Ricardo Guerra	Old	Reelected	Male
Samuel Carlos Rodiles Planas	Old	Retired	Male
Dayamí Rodríguez García	New	Reelected	Female
Yudí Mercedes Rodríguez Hernández	Old	Reelected	Female
Raúl Cirilo Rodríguez Lobaina	Old	Retired	Male
Luis Alberto Rodríguez López-Calleja	Old	Reelected	Male
Bruno Eduardo Rodríguez Parrilla	Old	Reelected	Male
Julio César Rodríguez Pimentel	New	Reelected	Male
Isdalis Rodríguez Rodríguez	New	Reelected	Female
Bárbara Rodríguez Sánchez	New	Not	Female
Omara Rojas Martínez	New	Not	Male
Manuela Teresa Rojas Monzón	New	Not	Female
Liz Belkis Rosabal Ponce	Old	Retired	Female
Ulises Rosales del Toro	Old	Retired	Male
Anisia Ruiz Gutiérrez	New	Not	Female
Omar Fernando Ruiz Martín	Old	Retired	Male
Adela Ruiz Villazón	New	Not	Male
Yoerky Sánchez Cuéllar	New	Reelected	Male
Ariel Santana Santiesteban	New	Reelected	Male
Rafael Ramón Santiesteban Pozo	New	Reelected	Male
Grisel Socarrás Desvernine	New	Not	Male
Maryleidis Sosa Trenzado	New	Not	Female
Romárico Sotomayor García	Old	Retired	Male
Jorge Luis Tapia Fonseca	Old	Reelected	Male
Olga Lidia Tapia Iglesias	Old	Retired	Female
Darilis Torres Aldana	New	Not	Male
Luis Antonio Torres Iríbar	Old	Retired	Male
Ramiro Valdés Menéndez	Old	Retired	Male
Salvador Valdés Mesa	Old	Reelected	Male
José Antonio Valeriano Fariñas	New	Not	Male
Divis Nubia Vázquez Rogena	New	Not	Male
Ramón Velázquez Núñez	New	Not	Male
Alina Vicente Gainza	Old	Retired	Female
Josefina de la Caridad Vidal Ferreiro	Old	Reelected	Female
Martha Magdalena Villanueva Herrera	New	Not	Female
Adel Onofre Yzquierdo Rodríguez	Old	Retired	Male
