= Rosa Elena Simeón Negrín =

Cuban politician

Rosa Elena Simeón Negrín was the Minister of Science, Technology and Environment of Cuba. Her role in government includes raising awareness of environmental issues amongst Cubans.

== Career ==
Simeón took on the position of Minister of the Environment in 1986 at a time when the issue was beginning to feature prominently in the political agenda of Governments and international organizations. In 1989, she participated, for the first time, in the Forum of Ministers of the Environment of Latin America and the Caribbean, whose sixth meeting took place in Brasília that year. Since then she has played a prominent role in subsequent regional forums and her presence has been widely recognized. Simeón was responsible for directing Cuba's preparations for the Rio Summit. In 1994 she participated in the development of the Alliance of Small Island States Summit (AOSIS).

The ninth meeting of the Forum of Ministers of the Environment of Latin America and the Caribbean took place in Cuba in 1995. Under Simeón's presidency, this event marked a significant change in those forums, with a shift of approach in the way the United Nations Environment Programme (UNEP) dealt with environmental problems in the region. Simeón attended the Kyoto Summit in 1997, to participate in the discussion of the Protocol that bears that city's name, a Protocol which was developed for the purpose of implementing the United Nations framework convention on climate change.

She was elected a member of the Bureau of the UNEP Governing Council in 2000, participating in the World Summit on Sustainable Development in South Africa in 2002. In 2003, after her role in the negotiation of its headquarters agreement, she presided over the sixth meeting of the Conference of the Parties to the United Nations Convention to Combat Desertification, which took place in Havana.

== Awards and honors ==
United Nations Champions of the Earth, 2006

== See also ==
- Council of Ministers of Cuba

Political offices
Preceded by	Minister of Science, Technology and Environment of Cuba	Succeeded by incumbent
