= 6th Secretariat of the Communist Party of Cuba =

The 6th Secretariat of the Communist Party of Cuba (PCC) was elected in 2011 by the 1st Plenary Session of the 6th Central Committee in the immediate aftermath of the 6th Party Congress.

== Officers ==
Title	Name	Birth	Gender
First Secretary of the Central Committee of the Communist Party of Cuba	Raúl Modesto Castro Ruz	1931	Male
Second Secretary of the Central Committee of the Communist Party of Cuba	José Ramón Machado Ventura	1930	Male

== Members ==
Rank	Name	5th SEC	7th SEC	Birth	Gender
1	José Ramón Machado Ventura	Old	Reelected	1930	Male
2	Juan Esteban Lazo Hernández	Old	Removed	1944	Male
3	Abelardo Álvarez Gil	Old	Reelected	1945	Male
4	José Ramón Balaguer Cabrera	Old	Reelected	1932	Male
5	Víctor Fidel Gaute López	Old	Removed	1960	Male
6	Olga Lidia Tapia Iglesias	Old	Reelected	1962	Female
7	Misael Enamorado Dáger	Old	Removed	1953	Male

== Changes ==
Name	Change	Date	7th SEC	Birth	Gender
Jorge Cuevas Ramos	Elected	3 July 2013	Reelected	1962	Male
Misael Enamorado Dáger	Removed	3 July 2013	Not	1953	Male
Víctor Fidel Gaute López	Removed	3 July 2013	Not	1960	Male
Juan Esteban Lazo Hernández	Removed	February 2013	Not	1944	Male
Omar Fernando Ruiz Martín	Elected	May 2013	Reelected	1962	Male
