= First Secretary of the Young Communist League =

First Secretary of the Central Committee of the Young Communist League
- Incumbent; Yuniasky Crespo Baquero since 24 September 2012
- Appointer: Central Committee
- Inaugural holder: Joel Iglesias
- Formation: 1962

The First Secretary of the Central Committee of the Young Communist League (Spanish: Primer Secretario del Comité Central de la Unión de Jóvenes Comunistas) is the highest office within the Young Communist League, the youth wing of the Communist Party of Cuba. The current first secretary is Yuniasky Crespo Baquero.

== Officeholders ==
No.	Name (birth–death)	Took office	Left office
1	Joel Iglesias (1941–2011)	1962	1966
2	Jaime Crombet Hernández-Baquero (born 1941)	1966	1972
3	Luis Orlando Domínguez Muñiz (born 1945)	1972	1982
4	Carlos Lage Dávila (born 1951)	1982	1986
5	Roberto Robaina (born 1956)	1986	1993
6	Juan Contino Aslán (born 1960)	1993	1994
7	Victoria Velázquez (born ?)	1994	1997
8	Otto Rivero Torres (born 1968)	1997	2004
9	Julio Martínez Ramírez (born 1968)	2004	2009
10	Liudmila Alamo Dueñas (born 1974)	October 2009	24 September 2012
11	Yuniasky Crespo Baquero (born 1977)	24 September 2012	Incumbent
