= 2009 Cuban government dismissals =

In March 2009, President Raúl Castro of Cuba dismissed numerous government ministers.

== Officials ==
- Foreign Minister Felipe Pérez Roque was dismissed on 2 March 2009. Fidel Castro then criticized him for love of power in a statement on 3 March, and Pérez Roque announced his resignation from all his party and state positions—membership on the Communist Party's Central Committee and Political Bureau, membership on the Council of State, and his role as a parliamentary deputy—in a letter published on 5 March. In that letter, he also accepted Castro's criticism and agreed that he had committed errors. He was replaced by Bruno Rodríguez Parrilla.
- Secretary of Council of Ministers Carlos Lage Dávila was replaced by Brig. Gen. José Amado Ricardo Guerra. Following Fidel Castro's statement of 3 March, Lage announced his resignation from all his party and state positions—membership on the Communist Party's Central Committee and Political Bureau, membership on the Council of State, and his role as a parliamentary deputy—in a letter published on 5 March. In that letter, he also accepted Castro's criticism and agreed that he had committed errors.
- José Luis Rodríguez García, the economy minister. He was replaced by Marino Murillo Jorge.
- Raúl de la Nuez, the foreign trade minister. He was replaced by Rodrigo Malmierca Díaz, then foreign investment minister. Both ministries merged.
- Georgina Barreiro Fajardo, the finance minister. Replaced by Lina Pedraza Rodríguez.
- Alfredo Morales Cartaya, the labour minister was replaced by Margarita Marlene González Fernández.
- Internal Commerce Minister Marino Murillo Jorge was replaced by Jacinto Angulo Pardo.
- Government Vice President Otto Rivero Torres was replaced by Ramiro Valdés Menéndez.
- Food Minister Alejandro Roca Iglesias and Fishing Minister Alfredo López Valdés were replaced by María del Carmen Concepción González.
- Education Minister Juan Vela Valdés was replaced by Miguel Díaz-Canel.
- Heavy Industries Minister Fernando Acosta Santana was replaced by Salvador Pardo Cruz.

== Government response ==
In March 2009, a government reshuffle was announced in Cuba, resulting in the replacement of eight ministers. The ruling Council of State and President Raul Castro explained that this move was intended to streamline and improve the efficiency of the Cuban government, Among those dismissed were prominent young leaders, including Foreign Minister Felipe Perez Roque and Cabinet chief Carlos Lage.

== Theories ==
=== Economic reforms ===
In an article "Purge Aims to Halt Cuba's Economic Free Fall", written by Frances Robles and Wilfredo Cancio and published in the Miami Herald in March 2009, the authors suggested that the purge was to get rid of the people who may have stood in the way of economic reforms.

=== Hugo Chávez ===
Former Mexican foreign minister Jorge Castañeda Gutman, in his Newsweek article published in the March 23, 2009 issue, asserted that Venezuelan President Hugo Chávez was plotting a coup in Cuba due to concerns that Raúl Castro would make concessions that would betray the 50-year-old Cuban Revolution. However, "long-time Cuba watchers expressed skepticism" about this claim.

According to his thesis, Hugo Chávez asked Leonel Fernández of the Dominican Republic to support the plot, but he declined. Castañeda's statements have been met with scepticism from politicians and scholars. He has admitted that he has no proof, calling his thesis "informed speculation".
