= Ministry of Foreign Affairs (Cuba) =

Government ministry of Cuba

Ministry of Foreign Affairs of the Republic of Cuba
- Ministerio de Relaciones Exteriores de la República de Cuba (MINREX)
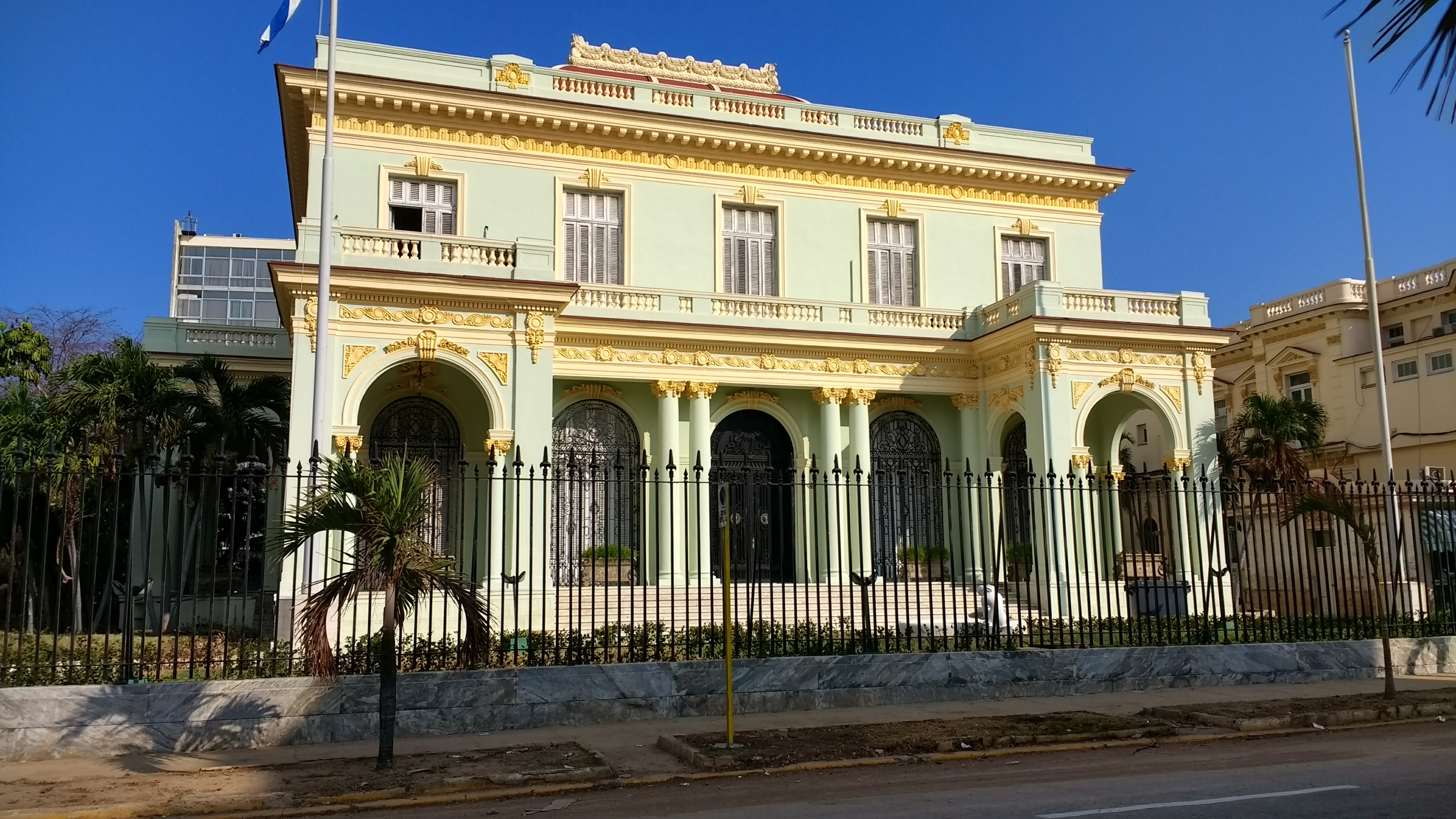

Agency overview
- Formed: December 23, 1959; 66 years ago
- Jurisdiction: Cuba and its diplomatic missions
- Headquarters: Havana
- Ministers responsible: Bruno Rodríguez Parrilla (PCC), Minister of Foreign Affairs; Gerardo Peñalver Portal, First Deputy Minister; Anayansi Camejo, Deputy Minister; Josefina Vidal, Deputy Minister; Elio Rodríguez Perdomo, Deputy Minister; Carlos Fernández de Cossío, Deputy Minister
- Website: Official website

The Ministry of Foreign Affairs (Spanish: Ministerio de Relaciones Exteriores), also known as MINREX, is the Cuban government ministry which oversees the foreign relations of Cuba.

As of 2020, the archives of MINREX had been selectively opened, making them a valuable resource to historians and researchers at a moment when other key Cuban archives remain sealed.

== Structure ==
- General Division for Latin America and the Caribbean (DGALC)
- General Division of Bilateral Affairs (DGAB)
- General Division for the United Estates (DGEEUU)
- Division of Multilateral Affairs and International Law (DGAMDI)
- General Division of Press, Communication and Image (DGPCI)
- General Division of Political Planning (DGPP)
- General Division of Consular Affairs and Cuban Residents Abroad (DACCRE)
- General Protocol Division (DP)
- Cadres Division (DC)
- Economic and Finance Division (DEF)
- Defense, Security and Protection Division (DDSP)
- Inspection Division (DI)
- Internal Audit Division (DAI)
- Independent Department Of Human Resources (DIRRHH)
- Independent Legal Department (DIJ)
- Costumer Service Group (GAP)

=== Subordinate units ===
- Computer Services and Technologies Center (CTSI)
- Multimedia and Computer Services Center (CSIM)
- Document Management Center (CGD)
- Passports and Procedures Center (CPT)
- Services and Support Unit (UAS)
- Accounting and Finance Center (CCF)
- Control Point (PD)

=== Attached units ===
- Cuban National Commission for UNESCO (CNCU)
- Center for Translation and Interpretation (ESTI)
- Raúl Roa García Higher Institute of International Relations (ISRI)
- International Policy Research Center (CIPI)

== See also ==
- Council of Ministers of Cuba
- Ministry of the Interior of Cuba (MININT)
- Ministry of Science, Technology and Environment (CITMA)
