= Ena Elsa Velázquez Cobiella =

Cuban politician

Ena Elsa Velázquez Cobiella is a Cuban politician. She has been a member of the National Assembly of People's Power and Minister of Education in the Cabinet of Cuba since 2008.
