= 6th Central Committee =

6th Central Committee may refer to:

- Central Committee of the 6th Congress of the Russian Social Democratic Labour Party (Bolsheviks), 1917–1918
- 6th Central Committee of the Chinese Communist Party, 1928–1945
- 6th Central Committee of the Communist Party of Cuba, 2011–2016
- 6th Central Committee of the Lao People's Revolutionary Party, 1996–2001
- 6th Central Committee of the Communist Party of Vietnam, 1986–1991
- Central Committee of the 6th Congress of the League of Communists of Yugoslavia, 1952–1958
- 6th Central Committee of the Workers' Party of Korea, 1980–2016
