= Juan Carlos García =

Juan Carlos García may refer to:

- Juan Carlos García (Mexican footballer) (born 1985), Mexican football defender
- Juan Carlos García (Honduran footballer) (1988–2018), Honduran football left back
- Juan Carlos García (actor) (born 1971), Venezuelan actor and model
- Juan Carlos García (equestrian) (born 1967), Colombian equestrian, who later represented Italy
- Juan Carlos García Pérez de Arce (born 1971), Chilean politician and minister
- Juan Carlos García Granda, Cuban politician and acting Minister of Tourism

== See also ==
- Juan Garcia (disambiguation)
