= Carlos Lage Dávila =

Cuban politician

- Born: 15 October 1951 (age 74); Havana, Cuba
- Education: Victoria de Girón School of Medicine
- Occupation: Politician
- Political party: Communist Party of Cuba

Carlos Aurelio Lage Dávila (born 15 October 1951) is a Cuban politician. Until 2009, he was a Vice President of the Council of State of Cuba, a member of the Politburo of the Communist Party of Cuba, and Executive Secretary of the Council of Ministers of Cuba. Lage was described as Cuba's de facto prime minister.

== Career ==
Lage trained as a pediatrician before entering the Cuban government. In the early 1990s Lage became an adviser to Fidel Castro, gaining a reputation as Cuba's "primary economic fixer". Lage was responsible for coordinating energy, trade and currency issues. Lage is also credited with Cuba's national Energy Revolution program and the collaboration with other countries in this area. In the early 1990s, during the economic era known in Cuba as the Special Period he initiated a series of economic reforms that allowed for limited land holdings and small business initiatives. More recently, Lage negotiated a guaranteed supply of subsidized oil from Venezuela, in exchange for medicines and up to 2,000 Cuban doctors and health professionals to live in Venezuela for a time and treat that country's poor. The scheme incorporates the Venezuelan Mission Barrio Adentro welfare program.

He is also known as an academic expert on U.S. history and politics. Thus he was an advisor to the president of Cuba (until recently Fidel Castro) on this topic. An avid reader in political theory, he is known to be an expert in comparative politics and democratic studies and he is a strong advocate of the Cuban political system. Internationally he is known for having conversations with European leaders.

With the retirement of President Fidel Castro in early 2008, Lage was mentioned by experts as a possible successor to Castro if the Cuban regime decided to go with a younger leader rather than Fidel's brother, Raúl Castro. On 24 February 2008, Raúl Castro was elected President; Lage was unanimously re-elected to his old post as one of the Vice Presidents of the Council of State.

On 2 March 2009 Raul Castro's government removed Lage from his position as Executive Secretary of the Council of Ministers as part of a substantial cabinet reshuffle. Fidel Castro then criticized him and Foreign Minister Felipe Pérez Roque (without naming them) for being influenced by the "honey of power" in a statement on 3 March, and Lage announced his resignation from all his party and state positions—membership on the Communist Party's Central Committee and Political Bureau, membership on the Council of State, and his role as a parliamentary deputy—in a letter published on 5 March. In that letter, he also accepted Castro's criticism and agreed that he had made mistakes.

It has been reported that Lage has returned to working in the health service.

== Footnotes ==
Political offices
Preceded by Osmany Cienfuegos Gorriarán	Executive Secretary of the Council of Ministers (1986–2009)	Succeeded by José Amado Ricardo Guerra
Preceded by	Vice President of the Council of State (1993–2009)	Succeeded by
