= Cancio =

Cancio is both a given name and a surname. Notable people with the name include:

== People with the given name ==
- Cancio Garcia (1937–2013), Filipino lawyer and jurist

== People with the surname ==
- Hiram Rafael Cancio (1920–2008), American judge
- Hugo Cancio (born 1964), Cuban-born American businessman and political activist
- Leopoldo Cancio (1858–1927), Cuban politician and economist
- Raúl Cancio (1911–1961), Spanish actor
