= 5th Secretariat of the Communist Party of Cuba =

The 5th Secretariat of the Communist Party of Cuba (PCC) was elected on 4 July 2006 by the 5th Plenary Session of the 5th Central Committee.

== Officers ==
Title	Name	Birth	Gender
First Secretary of the Central Committee of the Communist Party of Cuba	Fidel Alejandro Castro Ruz	1926	Male
Second Secretary of the Central Committee of the Communist Party of Cuba	Raúl Modesto Castro Ruz	1931	Male

== Members ==
Rank	Name	6th SEC	Birth	Gender
1	Fidel Alejandro Castro Ruz	Retired	1926	Male
2	Raúl Modesto Castro Ruz	Reelected	1931	Male
3	José Ramón Machado Ventura	Reelected	1930	Male
4	Juan Esteban Lazo Hernández	Reelected	1944	Male
5	Jorge Luis Sierra Cruz	Not	1961	Male
6	Abelardo Álvarez Gil	Reelected	1945	Male
7	María del Carmen Concepción González	Resigned	1957	Female
8	Lázara Mercedes López Acea	Not	1964	Female
9	Lina Olinda Pedraza Rodríguez	Resigned	1955	Female
10	Víctor Fidel Gaute López	Reelected	1960	Male
11	Roberto López Hernández	Not	19??	Male
12	Fernando Remírez de Estenoz	Not	1951	Male

== Changes ==
Name	Change	Date	6th SEC	Birth	Gender
María del Carmen Concepción González	Resigned	2 March 2009	Not	1957	Female
Misael Enamorado Dáger	Appointed	9 April 2009	Reelected	1953	Male
Roberto Tomás Morales Ojeda	Appointed	2008	Not	1967	Male
Lina Olinda Pedraza Rodríguez	Resigned	2 March 2009	Not	1955	Female
Olga Lidia Tapia Iglesias	Appointed	13 October 2009	Reelected	1962	Female
