= Marino Murillo Jorge =

Cuban politician (born 1961)

Minister of Economy and Planning
- In office 25 September 2014 – 14 July 2016
- Prime Minister: Raúl Castro
- Preceded by: Abel Rodriguez
- In office 2 March 2009 – 25 March 2011
- Prime Minister: Raúl Castro
- Deputy: Abel Rodriguez (as First Deputy Minister); Perez Betancourt (as Deputy Minister)
- Preceded by: José García
- Succeeded by: Abel Rodriguez

Minister of Internal Trade
- In office 2006 – 2 March 2009
- Prime Minister: Raúl Castro; Fidel Castro
- Deputy: Jacinto Pardo (as First Deputy Minister)
- Preceded by: Barbara Cuesta
- Succeeded by: Jacinto Pardo

Personal details
- Born: 19 February 1961 (age 65) Manzanillo, Cuba
- Party: Communist Party of Cuba
- Education: National Defence College

Marino Alberto Murillo Jorge (19 February 1961) is a Cuban politician, economist and former military officer. He received national media attention in 2009 on his appointment as Minister of Economy and Planning following the government shake-up announced by Raúl Castro on 2 March 2009. Murillo retained this post until 25 March 2011, but was reappointed to it on 25 September 2014 to lead reform efforts in the economic sphere. On 14 July 2016 he was sacked from his post for a second time, and moved to a new role tackling market reforms.

As Minister of Economy and Planning, his role was to spearhead economic reforms initiated by Raúl Castro. Murillo's intention is to rid the Cuban economy of its paternalistic features by updating the economic system. Murillo dislikes the idea of Cuba copying the economic reforms of Vietnam and China, claiming that the newly established private markets will benefit socialism rather than capitalism.

== Background ==
Little is known of Murillo's life before he became Minister of Economy and Planning in 2009. He was born on 19 February 1961, in Manzanillo, Cuba. and has a degree in economics from the Cuban National Defence College, and is a member of the Communist Party of Cuba. His official government biography states that he has "been linked to the economic sphere for more than 20 years" as Minister of Internal Trade, Deputy Minister of Economy and Planning and as an auditor for the Ministry of Food & Industry. He held the post of Minister of Internal Trade from 2006 until March 2, 2009 when he was succeeded by his First Deputy Minister Jacinto Angulo Pardo.

== Minister of Economy and Planning (2009–2011) ==
During Raúl Castro's 2009 Cuban government shake-up, Murillo replaced José Luis Rodríguez García as Minister of Economy and Planning and Vice President of the Council of Ministers. Murillo then appointed Abel Rodriguez to the First Deputyship of the ministry and Perez Betancourt to the Deputyship of the ministry. Early on during his tenure, Murillo criticised the paternalistic features of the Cuban economy. He also supported cutting the government's payroll by up 500,000 workers, a motion enacted but not completed.

When Murillo took office as the Cuban economy was affected by the Great Recession. At the 7th Plenum of the Central Committee of the Communist Party of Cuba he stated that public debate was needed before implementing changes to the economic system, claiming "that false unanimity is pernicious and debate and healthy disagreement must be encouraged". Murillo also highlighted the importance of "order and discipline, institutionalism, clear establishment of the duties and powers of every post and, above all, of convincing people of the need to work in order to satisfy their aspirations." His report was approved by the plenum. Murillo was elected a member of the Council of State in December 2009 to "improve the planning process of the national economy", according to Raúl Castro. By the end of 2009, Cuba's 2008 2.3 billion trade deficit had become a surplus of 400 million dollars. Murillo accomplished this through a 37.6 percent reduction in imports. The economy only grew 1.4 percent in 2009, down from 4.2 percent in the previous year. Initial planning had called for 6%, but as a result of the Great Recession, earnings from important sectors such as tourism noticeably decreased. There was a 22.9 percent decrease in exports, and a 37.4 percent decrease in imports, highlighting Murillo's efforts to reduce government hard currency expenses.

In a speech to the National Assembly of People's Power, the Cuban Parliament in August 2010, Murillo was asked if Cuba would pursue changes similar to those seen in Vietnam and the People's Republic of China. He replied; "I think the Cuban model is a very Cuban model. We cannot copy what many people in the world do", and further noted that the strongest country in the world, the United States, was their enemy. He went on to say that with updating rather than reforming, the Cuban state economic system would remain highly centralised, although some businesses, such as barbers for instance, should not be directly controlled by the government. On the updating of the economic system he stated that newly established private markets would prioritise the interest of socialism, and not those of capitalism. At the December convocation of Cuba's parliament, Murillo took center stage to talk about the difficulties, inefficiencies and constraints of the Cuban economic model. He outlined proposed reforms and explained the inefficiencies of the economy, stating that Cuba's updated economic model would function as a hybrid planned and market economy, but that the planned economy would remain dominant.

== "Reform czar" (2011–2016) ==
On 25 March 2011 Murillo was replaced as Minister of Planning and Economy by Adel Yzquierdo Rodriguez. It is not clear whether this was a demotion; the official version being that Murillo was replaced so that he could concentrate his efforts on "supervising the implementation of measures associated with the updating of the Cuban economic model" as Chairman of the Economic Policy Commission of the 6th Party Congress. He does however retain overall control over the Ministry of Planning and Economy, as well as other "productive sectors". One foreign observer considered Murillo's position to be strengthened after his appointment as Chairman of the Economic Policy Commission, and referred to him as a "superminister" of economic reform. As commission chairman Murillo is in charge of implementing Raúl Castro's economic reforms.

At the Communist Party of Cuba's 6th Congress Murillo was elected to its Politburo. Murillo was considered to be one of Raúl Castro's possible successors as Cuban leader. According to an anonymous European diplomat in Havana, Murillo is the "one to watch".

== Offices held ==
Political offices
Preceded by —	Chairman of the Economic Policy Commission; 2011–present	Succeeded by —
Preceded by José Luis Rodríguez García	Vice President of the Council of Ministers; 2009–present	Succeeded by —
Preceded by José Luis Rodríguez García	Minister of Economy and Planning; 2009–2011	Succeeded by Adel Yzquierdo Rodriguez
Preceded by Barbara Castillo Cuesta	Minister of Internal Trade; 2006–2009	Succeeded by Jacinto Angulo Pardo
