= Georgina Barreiro Fajardo =

Cuban former politician

- Born: 1963 or 1964 (age 60–61)
- Occupation: Politician

Minister of Finance and Prices
- In office 21 June 2003 – 2 March 2009

Georgina Barreiro Fajardo is a Cuban former politician who served as Minister of Finance and Prices from 2003 until 2009.

== Career ==
On 21 June 2003, Barreiro was appointed Minister of Finance and Prices by Fidel Castro, following the dismissal of Manuel Millares Rodriguez. She had previously served as vice president of the Central Bank of Cuba.

On 2 March 2009, during the government reshuffle by Raúl Castro, she was replaced with Lina Olinda Pedraza Rodríguez.

Political offices
Preceded by Manuel Millares Rodriguez	Minister of Finance and Prices; 2003–2009	Succeeded by Lina Olinda Pedraza Rodríguez
