= Oscar Pérez-Oliva Fraga =

Cuban politician

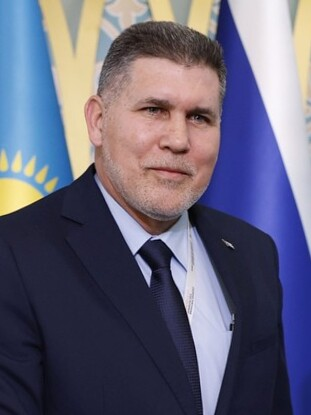
- Pérez-Oliva in 2026

Deputy Prime Minister of Cuba
- Incumbent
- Assumed office 18 October 2025
- Prime Minister: Manuel Marrero Cruz

Minister of Foreign Trade and Investment
- Incumbent
- Assumed office 23 May 2024
- Prime Minister: Manuel Marrero Cruz

Personal details
- Born: 1 March 1971 (age 55)
- Party: Communist Party of Cuba
- Profession: Politician

Oscar Pérez-Oliva Fraga is a Cuban politician and member of the Castro family. Since October 2025, he serves as Deputy Prime Minister and Minister of Foreign Trade and Investment in the Cuban government.

At the time of the 2026 Cuban crisis, he was regarded as a pragmatist and reformist leader.

== Biography ==
His maternal grandmother, Ángela Castro, was an elder sister of former Cuban presidents Fidel Castro and Raúl Castro.

Pérez-Oliva was educated in electrical engineering at the Polytechnic José Antonio Echeverría and has had a long career working for the Cuban state in trade roles. He was vice-minister and then first vice-minister at the Ministry of Foreign Trade and Investment (MINCEX) before being named minister in May 2025. In October 2025, he was named one of five deputy prime ministers of Cuba in addition to his ministerial portfolio.

In March 2026, he announced the Cuban Government would allow the Cuban emigrées to return to the island and to invest in the private economy.
