= Salvador Pardo Cruz =

Cuban Minister of Heavy Industries

Cuban Minister of Heavy Industries
- Incumbent
- Assumed office March 2009
- Preceded by: Fernando Acosta Santana

Personal details
- Party: Communist Party of Cuba
- Profession: Radiotechnical Engineer

Brigade General Salvador Pardo Cruz is a Cuban politician and the Cuban Minister of Heavy Industries (2009–present), replacing Fernando Acosta Santana after the 2009 shake-up by Raúl Castro.

== Early life ==
He is a radiotechnical engineer. He had previously held the position of Director of the Military Industries Union. He is a member of the Communist Party of Cuba.

He was superior officer of the Revolutionary Armed Forces for more than 45 years, mainly in combat units of the Coheterile Antiaircraft Troops. He was General Coordinator and Director in 1998 of the companies belonging to the Union of Military Industry. He is in charge, since 2009, of the Ministry of the Sidero-Mechanical and Electronic Industry, replacing Fernando Acosta Santana and thus ending his position as General Director of the Union of Military Industry.
