= José Luis Rodríguez García =

Cuban politician

José Luis Rodríguez García was the Cuban Minister of Economy and Planning. He was also a Vice President of the Cuban Council of Ministers and an elected member of the National Assembly of Cuba. He was the Minister of Finance from 1994 to 1995. Rodríguez was Minister of Economy and Planning since 1998. He was replaced by Internal Trade Minister Marino Murillo in March 2009.

== Biography ==
Rodríguez was born in Havana in 1946. He was a political activist during his early years becoming leader of the Federation of Secondary Students, the Federation of University Students, and the Union of Communist Youth. He graduated in Economics in the late 1960s and then joined the Centro de Investigaciones de la Economía Mundial (CIEM), the most influential Cuban think-tank in global economics. Since becoming economic minister Rodríguez has participated in various economic seminars and forums throughout the world, including Davos, Switzerland.

== See also ==
- Politics of Cuba

Political offices
Preceded by Osvaldo Martínez	Minister of Economy and Planning; 1998–2009	Succeeded by Marino Murillo
