= Margarita Marlene González Fernández =

Cuban politician

Cuban Minister of Labor and Social Security
- Incumbent
- Assumed office March 2009

Personal details
- Party: Communist Party of Cuba
- Profession: Industrial Engineer

Margarita Marlene González Fernández is a Cuban politician and is the Cuban Minister of Labor and Social Security (2009–present). She was appointed as a result of the 2009 shake-up by Raúl Castro.

== Early life ==
Ms. González has a Master's Degree in Human Resources and is an Industrial Engineer. In 2001, she was made Vice Minister of Labor and Social Security and in 2003, she was appointed to First Vice Minister. She is a member of the Communist Party of Cuba.
