= Meisi Bolaños =

Cuban politician

Meisi Bolaños Weiss

Cuban Minister of Finances and Prices
- In office 8 January 2019 – April 2023
- President: Miguel Diaz-Canel
- Preceded by: Lina Olinda Pedraza Rodríguez
- Succeeded by: Vladimir Regueiro

Personal details
- Born: 27 May 1970 (age 56)
- Party: Communist Party of Cuba
- Education: University of Havana

Meisi Bolaños Weiss (born 27 May 1970) is a Cuban politician and was the Cuban Minister of Finances and Prices from 2019 to 2023.

== Education and career ==
She has a law degree. She graduated from the University of Havana in 1993 and also studied financial administration.

She was legal director of the Ministry of Finances and Prices from 2005 to April 2007. She was appointed deputy minister of finance and prices from April 2007 to 2019. On 8 January 2019, she was appointed Minister of Finances and Prices, and has recently worked with price stability.
