= Manuel Dorta-Duque =

Cuban politician, lawyer, author, and university professor

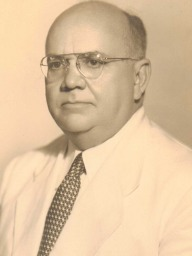
- Manuel Dorta-Duque, 1940
- Born: June 27, 1896; Matanzas, Cuba
- Died: July 6, 1964 (aged 68); Havana, Cuba
- Occupations: Attorney, Politician
- Known for: Cuban Code on Agrarian Reform
- Title: Representative, Cuban House of Representatives
- Term: 1944–1958
- Political party: Partido Ortodoxo
- Honours: Pro-Ecclesia et Pontiff, 1950

Manuel Antonio Dorta-Duque (June 27, 1896, Matanzas – July 6, 1964, Havana) was a Cuban politician, lawyer, writer, university professor, and signator of the 1940 Constitution of Cuba. He was National Chief of the Order of Knights of Columbus and Rector of the Pontifical Academy of Social Sciences in Havana. He was named Defender of the Catholic Faith in Cuba, and on July 27, 1950 Pope Pius XII granted him the Pro-Ecclesia et Pontiff distinction for his efforts. He was a benefactor and generous donor to the Catholic Church, and helped build the Iglesia Nuestra Señora de la Candelaria, dedicated to the Virgen from the Island of Tenerife, Canary Islands, where his ancestral roots can be found. In 2008, this cathedral was named a UNESCO World Heritage site.

== Early life ==
Dorta-Duque was born on June 27, 1896, in what was then called Corral Falso de Macuriges, today Pedro Betancourt Province of Matanzas. He studied in Havana; first, in the Pious Schools, then in Colegio de Belen, where he graduated in 1914. He graduated with a Doctorate of Civil Law in 1918 from the University of Havana, where he founded the Journal of Law Students (scientific and informative), and was the president of the Association of Law Students. Along with the presidents of other student organizations, he formed the first University Council, which he chaired. As a law professor, he specialized, in Family Law and Divorce Law. In 1930, he was instrumental in negotiations with the United States regarding the viability of international divorces occurring on the island.

Upon graduation, he established his own Law Firm, specializing in Family Law. During the dictatorship of Gerardo Machado he defended outspoken university professors and students before the Courts and War Councils. He went on to teach at the University of Havana, as Professor of Mortgage Law and, thanks to his management, the School of Agrarian Law was created, of which he was the first Professor.

== Family ==
He married Carmen Ortiz Reyes in 1919, with whom he formed an exemplary family in many ways. They had seven children, all who went on to hold doctorate degrees and serve their communities. Rev. Juan Manuel Dorta-Duque, was their oldest son, who after studying in London, and in Rome at the Vatican, gained a doctorate in philosophy and became a Jesuit Priest. After a long career as an educator, as Director Emeritus of the Belen Alumni Association, he helped establish Belen Jesuit Preparatory School in Miami, where there is a road named in his honor. Carmen Dorta-Duque, held a doctorate degree in education, and was a teacher and principal in several Catholic Schools in Cuba and later in Miami. Manuel Antonio Dorta-Duque, held a doctorate degree in Civil Rights Law from the University of Havana, and became Public Defender before the Cuban Supreme Court in March, 1959. After leaving Cuba, he had a long career as an attorney in Puerto Rico. Franscico Dorta-Duque also obtained a doctorate degree in philosophy and became a Jesuit Priest. He moved to the Dominican Republic where he had a long career as a journalist, and television and radio talk show host discussing religion, politics and current events. Margarita Dorta-Duque, held a doctorate degree in law, and worked alongside her father in his law firm in Cuba. Jorge Enrique Dorta-Duque held a doctorate degree in Mathematics and Physics, and went on to serve as Head of Public Works in Cuba. After leaving Cuba, his career as an architect and general contractor in Miami, Florida spanned more than 50 years and included projects in Connecticut, Puerto Rico, The Bahamas, Miami Beach and Fort Pierce . Maria Elena Dorta-Duque, the youngest, held a doctorate degree in Library Studies, and became Professor and Director of Scientific Information of the Higher Institute of International Relations, in Cuba

== Published works ==
Dorta-Duque wrote an extensive volume of legal and political essays and laws. In 1922 he published Fundamentals and Reforms in Procedural Law (work awarded by the Bar Association). He also published Summary of an Elementary Course in Civil Law in 1925. and wrote several Legal Works, including The Endorsement in Civil Law, The Code of Soviets, The Analogy in the Causes of Divorce and The Abuse of Law. Among his other works are Explained Mortgage Legislation Program (1926), Civil Law Program (1930) and Possession and Advertising (1932). In 1949, he was chief editor of the political magazine, A Barrer. He also wrote a book, Coursework in Mortgage Legislation.

== Famous cases ==
Dorta-Duque successfully represented the Salesian Congregation and Foundation of Dolores de Betancourt for Destitute Boys and Girls before the New York Supreme court in the lawsuit brought in 1930 by Angela del Castillo y Betancourt, contesting the will of Dolores de Betancourt. The executor of the will had died, and Ms. Betacourt's estate contained hundreds of thousands of dollars in New York State bonds which were bequeathed to the Foundation. Her daughter contested the will, and it was appealed up to the New York Supreme Court, but Dorta-Duque was successful in protecting the assets of the Salesian Congregation, the Foundations and the Catholic Church.

== Sumner Welles negotiations ==
In 1933, Sumner Welles, Assistant Secretary of State for Latin American Affairs, was sent as special envoy to Cuba to help negotiate a settlement during the government overthrow of President Gerardo Machado. in which Dorta-Duque participated. Mediation was a process of understanding between the parties of the government and the opposition with a view to finding a peaceful solution, to avoid US military action as required by the Platt Amendment. On July 1, 1933, the official conversations began between the government of Gerardo Machado and the opposition groups that supported the Mediation. Two daily sessions were held at the headquarters of the United States embassy in Cuba. The government delegation was made up of General Alberto Herrera Franchi, Secretary of State; Dr. Octavio Averhoff, Secretary of the Treasury and Dr. Mario Ruiz Mesa, a member of the House of Representatives and former Secretary of Justice. And the opposition was represented by Colonel Dr. Cosme de la Torriente, from the Nationalist Union; Joaquín Martínez Sáenz, for ABC; Nicasio Silveira, for the Revolutionary Radical Cellular Organization; and Dr. Manuel Dorta-Duque, led the delegation for the University of Havana; along with others.

After the eventual overthrow of President Gerardo Machado, and several interim leaders, President Ramon Grau San Martin took office as head of state of Cuba. In December 1933, amidst continued political turmoil, negotiations continued between opposition factions, the newly formed government and Sumner Welles. Once again, Dr. Dorta-Duque's participation was pivotal in these negotiations, as he was one of three opposition leaders, along with Dr. Cosme de la Torriente and Mendez Penate, to inform Mr. Welles that "all possibility of a peaceful solution was terminated". It was reported that the negotiations for President Grau to resign, eventually broke down upon the pressure exerted by Dr. Dorta-Duque who was seen as a "close friend of Mr. Welles" and had threaten an "immediate revolt" should Grau agree to a national government. In reference to Dr. Dorta-Duque's influence during a meeting on December 11, 1933, at the Presidential Palace, Dr. Fernandez, the Uruguayan Minister stated that "A rupture was produced by persons who represented themselves as connected Mr. Welles."

== Life in politics ==
He was the Secretary of the Treasury of Cuba from October 1936 to December 1936. In 1939 he was elected to the Constitutional Assembly by the Republican Action Party. During the 1940 Constitutional Assembly, Dorta-Duque contributed his legal and agrarian knowledge in the discussions and preparation of the Constitution, and was a Constitutional Signatory. In 1944 he was elected Representative to the Chamber in Havana by the Republican Action Party. In the House of Representatives he was president of the Finance Commission. Among the laws he helped to create are the Organic Law of the Court of Accounts, the Organic Law of Budgets (co-author), the Law of the National Bank of Cuba (co-author) and the Law of Free Universities. In 1945, he was Delegate to the Inter-American Conference on the Problems of War and Peace in Mexico City, Mexico.

Dorta-Duque was known for his "Moral Integrity." When the Party of the Cuban People (Orthodox) was created in 1948, Dorta-Duque entered its ranks. And in 1948, the Liberal-Democratic candidate for president, Ricardo Nunez Portuondo - a member of the political opposition to Dorta-Duque's Orthodox party, included Dorta-Duque's words in his political advertisements - mentioning Dorta-Duque as a paragon of integrity. He was reelected to the House of Representatives in 1950. During this second legislative period, in 1951, he proposed the Moral Rehabilitation Law of Miguel Mariano Gómez Arias, thus annulling the sentence that dismissed him as President of the Republic. Although Gómez Arias died months before the approval of this law, his dignity was restored to the Cuban people.

Perhaps the most important political influence of Dorta-Duque was in 1947, when he authored the Cuban Code on Agrarian Reform in the Congress of the Republic of Cuba. This law was so important, that it was brought back into the Free Agrarian debate some 50 years later. In 1997, when faced with food shortages and hunger, the country returned to the principles set forth in his Cuban Code: "the land for those who work it" and the "property for the peasant and free market for the product of the land"

After the coup d'état of General Fulgencio Batista Zaldívar in 1952, Dorta-Duque ceased to serve as Representative. However, he remained active against the new government, fighting from his private law firm and before the Emergency Courts.
