= Anayansi Camejo =

Cuban diplomat

Anayansi Rodríguez Camejo (born October 22, 1968) is a Cuban diplomat who was a Cuban Permanent Representative to the United Nations.

== Education ==
Camejo studied for a diploma in International Relations and Development at the International Institute of Social Studies in The Hague and earned a bachelor's degree in International Economic Relations from the Raúl Roa García Higher Institute of International Relations in Havana in 1991.

== Career ==
Camejo diplomatic career began in 1995 with her appointment as Third Secretary and Specialist in Economic and Environmental Affairs in the Ministry of Foreign Affairs until 1999 when she was promoted to the position of Second Secretary in charge of disarmament and international security affairs before being transferred to Permanent Mission of Cuba to the United Nations Office at Geneva and other international organizations based in Switzerland in 2002. From 2002 to 2005 she was First Secretary, Specialist in disarmament and international security affairs, Division of Multilateral Affairs, MINREX, Cuba. She was appointed Cuban Ambassador to the United Nations Office at Geneva and other international organizations based in Switzerland from 2013 to 2016 and served as Cuban Permanent Representative to the United Nations from 2017 until 2019 when she was appointed Deputy Minister of Foreign Affairs of Cuba.
