= Jose Maria Bosch Lamarque =

Cuban exile and businessman (1898–1994)

José Bosch
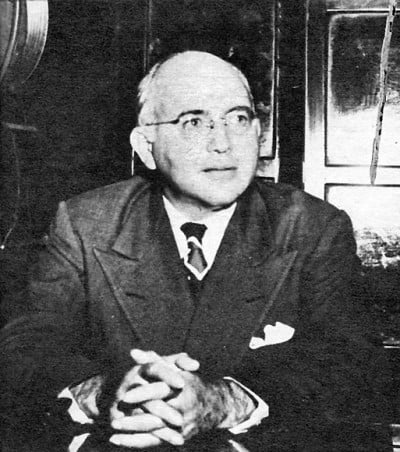

Cuban Minister of Finance
- In office 1949–1951
- President: Carlos Prío Socarrás

Chief Executive and President of Bacardi
- In office 1944–1976

Personal details
- Born: 1898 Santiago de Cuba
- Died: April, 1994 (aged 95) Coral Gables, Florida
- Spouses: Enriqueta Schueg Bacardi; Maria Miller Bosch
- Education: Lehigh University
- Nickname: Pepín Bosch

José Maria Bosch Lamarque (Pepín Bosh) was a Cuban exile and the chief executive and president of Bacardi for 32 years. He is credited for saving the Bacardi company from bankruptcy and closure several times in his tenure, and oversaw its rum empire during the most tumultuous moments in the company's history, including the Great Depression and the Cuban Revolution. He also used his position to influence politics on the island of Cuba, alongside other members of the Bacardi family. He was one of the few Cuban finance ministers to take the island from a deficit to a surplus, largely because he was incorruptible while he was in office. During his tenure at Bacardi, he transformed the company from a locally distributed Latin American rum, into the world's largest rum company. After the Cuban Revolution, Bosch created the Representation of Cuban Exiles (RECE), an exile group dedicated to the ouster of Fidel Castro.

== Early life ==
Bosch's father was a Spanish banker and owner of Cuban sugar mills, who made a fortune on the island. Bosch worked at his father's sugar mill until the 1920s and the collapse of the Dance of the Millions and the follow-on collapse of the Cuban sugar market economy. After this, Bosch became a bookkeeper at the Havana branch of the First National Bank of New York.

== Career at Bacardi ==
In 1922, Bosch married Enriqueta Schueg Bacardi, who was a member of the famed Bacardi family.

In the 1930s Bosch financed the uprising against President Gerardo Machado which culminated in the Cuban Revolution of 1933, resulting in Cuba being ran by a group known as the Pentarchy.

In 1949, Carlos Prío Socarrás convinced Bosch to serve as the Cuban Home Secretary and Minister of Finance. While serving in this role, Bosch transformed Cuba's economy: he took the island from a deficit of $18 million to a surplus of $15 million. Time Magazine called him "The best Finance Minister Cuba ever had..." Bosch knew what everyone in Cuba owed in taxes, and he made them pay. He even forced members of the president's own family to pay their back taxes. Bosch rooted-out corruption at almost every level of the Cuban government and society: the Customs Division, underground nightclubs, gangsters, corrupt congressmen – and he made them all pay whatever they owed in taxes and fees. When he left the office, he informed the press that it was on "his doctor's orders."

Bosch's relationship with Fidel Castro began early on in the Cuban Revolution. Many of the Bacardi family supported the revolution against Fulgencio Batista. Bosch personally gave tens of thousands of dollars of his own money to the cause of the revolution. Pepín Bosch and Daniel Bacardi were two of the men to accompany Castro on his first trip to the United States after taking power in 1959, but Bosch soon began to fear what Castro's government would mean for the future of the Bacardi company.

After Castro exiled the entire Bacardi family and confiscated Bacardi operations and facilities in Cuba, Bosch reorganized Bacardi operations outside of Cuba, and is credited with saving the company, again, at this time.

However, largely unknown to Castro, Bosch had already transferred much of the company's assets from Cuba to Nassau, The Bahamas. Bosch had done this fearing that Bacardi would become the target of the Batista regime, and that their secret recipes and trademarks might become vulnerable to Batista, or the Mafia state. As a result of this transfer, which occurred between 1955 and 1957, Castro was unable to obtain any of Bacardi's recipes or trademarks when he nationalized the company's assets.

Bosch was a funder of the Citizens Committee for a Free Cuba, set up in 1963. In 1964, Bosch informed the attorney general, Robert F. Kennedy (RFK), that he was asked frequently to donate to anti-Castro activities, including several attempts to assassinate Fidel Castro and other Cuban government leaders. Bosch would often turn them down, informing them that he was not interested in murder. Bosch also told RFK that he did not give as much money to the plot as he was asked. Bosch also confirmed to his Cuban exile friends that his contacts at the Central Intelligence Agency were not interested in these anti-Castro plots.

However, according to the Colombian journalist Hernando Calvo Ospina, Bosch not only wanted Castro murdered, but sponsored many of the anti-Castro groups in their extremist activities. Calvo Ospina also suggested that Bosch and the Bacardi company not only bankrolled these organizations, but also planned the deliberate bombing of Cuban oil refineries and plunging the island into a nationwide blackout. Calvo Ospina also suggested that Bosch did in fact contribute $100,000 to the plot to assassinate Fidel Castro. Bosch also purchased a B-26 bomber to facilitate the bombing of the Cuban oil fields.

Bosch was a member of the Movimiento Resistencia Cívico (MRC, trans. "Civic Resistance Movement"). He was a major financial backer of the exile militant group Representatación Cubana en el Exilio (RECE, trans. "Cuban Representation in Exile").

== Later life ==
Enriqueta Bacardi died in 1975. Bosch retired the next year, by the time he did, Bacardi was the largest rum company in the world.

Bosch's second wife was Maria Miller Bosch. In 1992, Bosch moved to Florida.
