= Jacinto Angulo Pardo =

Cuban politician

Minister of Internal Trade
- Incumbent
- Assumed office 2 March 2009
- Prime Minister: Raúl Castro
- Preceded by: Marino Murillo

Personal details
- Party: Communist Party of Cuba
- Profession: Industrial Engineer

Jacinto Angulo Pardo is a Cuban politician and the Cuban Minister of Internal Trade (2009–Present). He was appointed in 2009 shake-up by Raúl Castro. Mr Angulo has a master's degree in International Relations and is an industrial engineer. Since 2006, he had been the first vice-president of Domestic Trade.
