= José Miguel Miyar Barruecos =

Cuban politician

Cuban Minister of Science, Technology and the Environment
- In office March 2009 – March 2012
- Succeeded by: Elba Rosa Pérez Montoya

Personal details
- Born: August 3, 1932 (age 93)
- Party: Communist Party of Cuba
- Profession: Medical doctor

Dr. José Miguel Miyar Barruecos (born 3 August 1932, in Siboney) is a Cuban politician and the Cuban Minister of Science, Technology and the Environment from 2009 to March 2012.

== Biography ==
Dr. Miyar was a member in the Cuban Revolutionary Forces. He is a medical doctor. He was the Director of the Cuban Rural Medical Service. He was Secretary to the Council of State from 1980 to 2009. Dr. Miyar was a Deputy in the National Assembly of Popular Power and a Member of the Central Committee of the Communist Party of Cuba until 2013.
