= Orlando Requeijo Gual =

Cuban diplomat

Orlando Requeijo Gual was the Permanent Representative of Cuba to the United Nations from 2004 to 2006.

Diplomatic posts
Preceded by Bruno Rodriguez Parrilla	Permanent Representative of Cuba to the United Nations; 2004–2006	Succeeded by Rodrigo Malmierca Díaz
