= Josefina Vidal =

Cuban diplomat

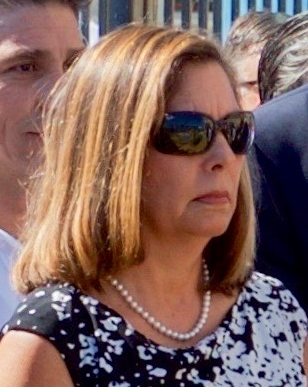
- Josefina Vidal Ferreiro (2015)

Deputy Minister of Foreign Affairs
- Incumbent
- Assumed office 2021
- President: Miguel Diaz-Canel
- Prime Minister: Manuel Marrero Cruz
- Minister: Bruno Rodriguez

Director General of the North American Division of the Ministry of Foreign Affairs
- In office 2013 - 2018
- Deputy: Gustavo Machin

Ambassador of Cuba to Canada
- In office 2018 - 2021

Personal details
- Born: 18 February 1961 (age 65)
- Education: Moscow State Institute of International Relations

Josefina de la Caridad Vidal Ferreiro (born 18 February 1961) is a Cuban diplomat, and has been the Deputy Minister of Foreign Affairs of Cuba. Previously she was director general of the North American Division in the Ministry of Foreign Affairs since 2013.

== Career ==
Vidal graduated from the Moscow State Institute of International Relations in 1984 with a degree of Bachelor of International Relations.

Vidal has previously held several United States-related posts in the Ministry of Foreign Affairs. From 1999 to 2003 she was First Secretary in the Cuban Interests Section in Washington, D.C., and from 1991 to 1997 she was an analyst at the Cuban Embassy in Paris, France.

Before entering diplomatic work she had been an Assistant Researcher in the Center of Studies of the United States at the University of Havana.

In August 2017 it was reported that Vidal had travelled to Moscow in late July for talks with Russian Deputy Foreign Minister Sergei Ryabkov and the Cuban Ambassador in Moscow Emilio Lozada Garcia.

From 2018 to 2021, she served as Cuban ambassador to Canada.

In 2021, she became Deputy Minister of Foreign Affairs.

== Personal life ==
She is fluent in English, French, and Russian.
