= Felipe Pérez Roque =

Cuban politician

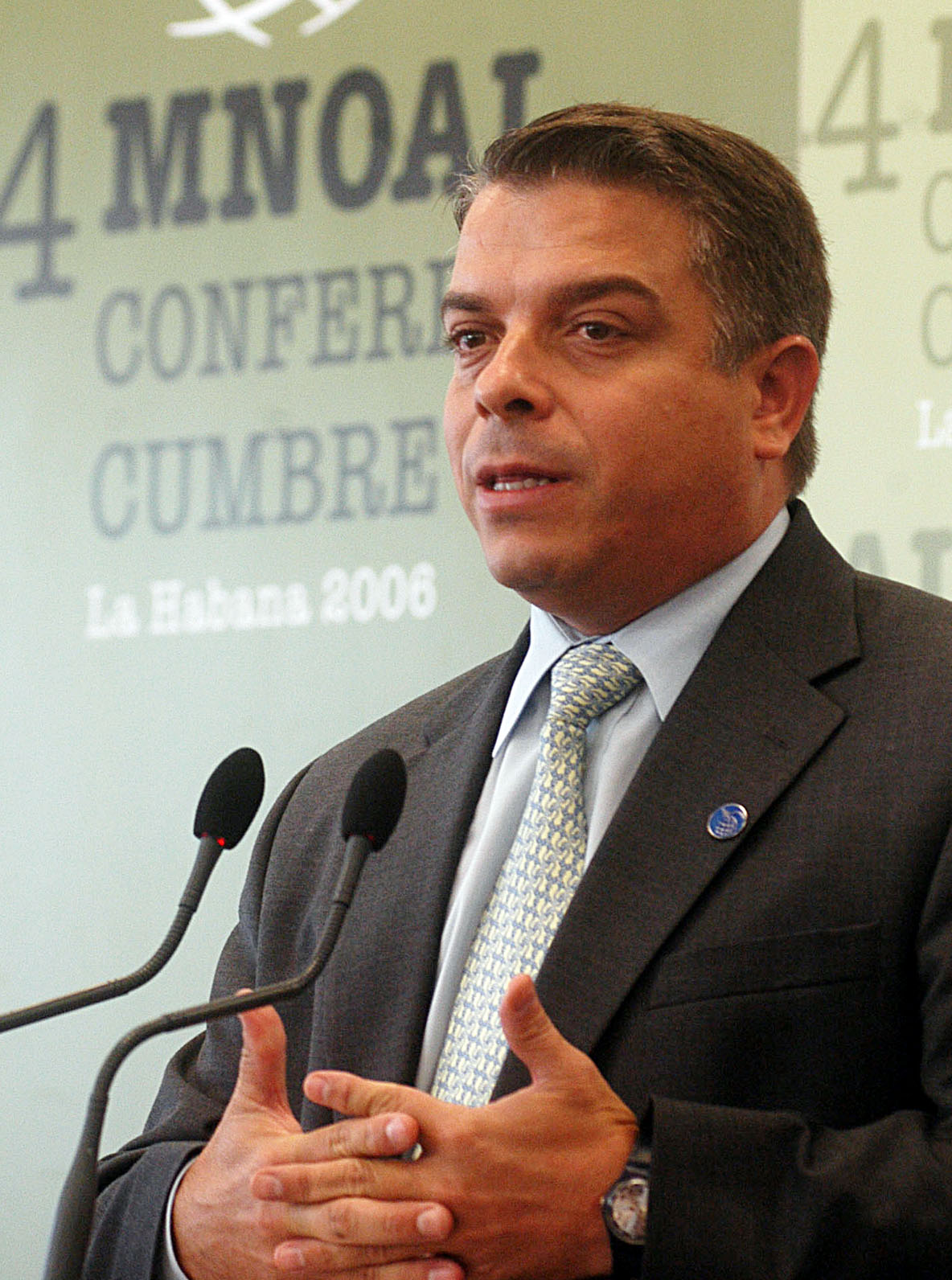

Minister of Foreign Affairs of Cuba
- In office 28 May 1999 – 2 March 2009
- Preceded by: Roberto Robaina
- Succeeded by: Bruno Rodríguez Parrilla

Personal details
- Born: 28 March 1965 (age 61) Havana, Cuba
- Party: Communist Party of Cuba

Felipe Ramón Pérez Roque (born 28 March 1965) was the Minister of Foreign Affairs of Cuba from 1999 to 2009. At his appointment, he was not only the youngest member of the Cuban cabinet but also the only one to be born after the Cuban Revolution in 1959.

== Biography ==
Pérez Roque was formerly an electronics engineer and leader of student organizations who had served as Fidel Castro's chief of staff for a decade prior to his ministry. As well as being a prominent member of the Cuban Council of Ministers, Pérez Roque was also a member of the Central Committee of the Communist Party of Cuba and served on the Council of State. He was replaced as Foreign Minister by former United Nations Ambassador Bruno Rodríguez Parrilla in March 2009 after allegations of expressing scornful words against Fidel Castro's rule and the positions of other senior communist party leaders obtained from covert recording bugs. He was deposed from all his party and state positions.

== Role as Foreign Minister ==
Pérez Roque's role as foreign minister was defined by statements opposing the foreign policies of the United States, in regard to both the status of Cuba and in regard to wider US foreign policy. He called Cuba a "country under siege" as a result of the US embargo against Cuba Pérez Roque made a series of speeches at the annual United Nations General Assembly gatherings, criticizing the role of the United States and requesting that US troops be withdrawn from Iraq. At the gatherings, he also petitioned for the security council to include Third World countries, that all nations cooperate in the fight against terrorism, and that it is the responsibility of developed countries to ensure general and complete disarmament including nuclear disarmament.

Pérez Roque was also responsible for the deepening of trade relations between Cuba and the People's Republic of China, and made a number of high-profile trips to the country, signing a key military agreement between the two nations.

Pérez Roque was dismissed as Foreign Minister on 2 March 2009. Fidel Castro then criticized him and Carlos Lage Dávila (without naming them) for love of power in a statement on 3 March, and Pérez Roque announced his resignation from all his party and state positions—membership on the Communist Party's Central Committee and Political Bureau, membership on the Council of State, and his role as a parliamentary deputy—in a letter published on 5 March. In that letter, he also accepted Castro's criticism and agreed that he had made mistakes.

== Personal life ==
He is married to Tania Crombet, Jaime Crombet's daughter (Crombet was the Vice President of the National Assembly of People’s Power until 2013) with two children.

== See also ==
- Foreign relations of Cuba
- Politics of Cuba

Political offices
Preceded by Roberto Robaina Gonzalez	Foreign Minister of Cuba; 1999–2009	Succeeded by Bruno Rodríguez Parrilla
