= Leopoldo Cancio =

Cuban politician and economist

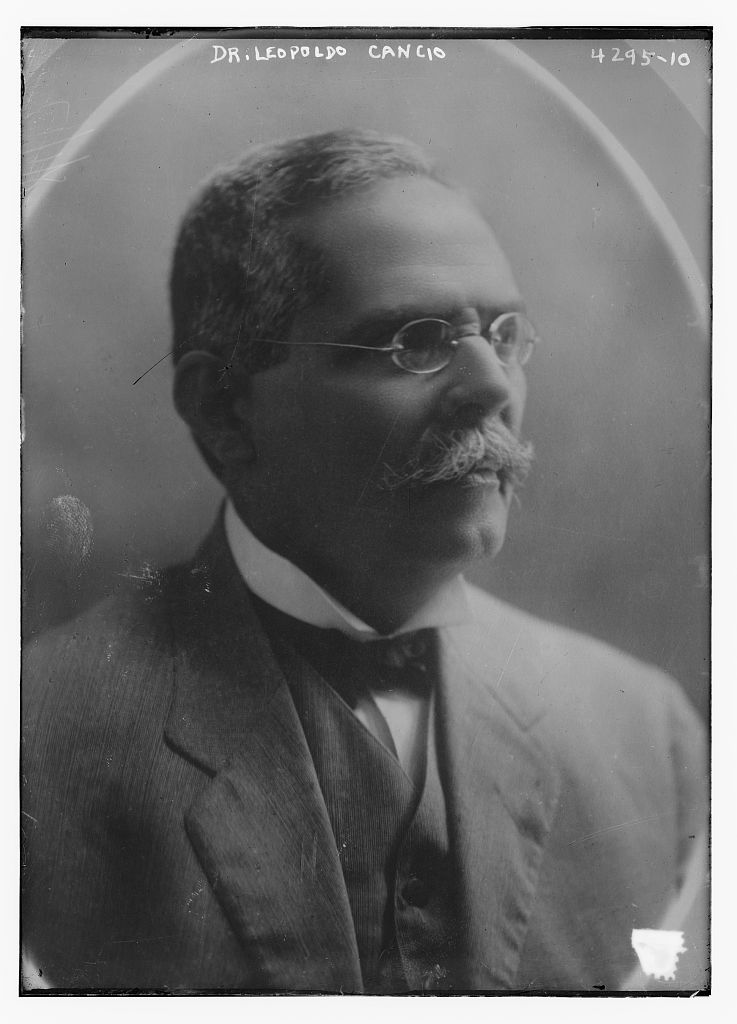
Leopoldo Cancio y Luna in 1917

Leopoldo Cancio y Luna (30 May 1851 in Sancti Spiritus, Cuba – 1 May 1927 in Havana, Cuba) was a Cuban politician and economist.

== Biography ==
He was born on 30 May 1851 in Sancti Spiritus, Cuba.

He attended the El Salvador School in Havana founded by Jose de la Luz y Caballero. He graduated with a law degree from the University of Havana in 1873. In 1879, Cancio was elected as one of the deputies from Cuba to the Spanish Cortes. He served as the editor of El Triunfo, El Pais and later La Union. He also was the professor of political economy and finance at University of Havana.

During the American intervention (1898–1902), he served in the Treasury department under the governments of John Rutter Brooke and Leonard Wood. He served as Assistant Secretary of the Government under the administration of Tomás Estrada Palma (1902–1904) and was later the Secretary of Education. He later broke with the government and with Emilio Núñez helped found the Conservative Party.

In 1913, when the Conservative Party won the election, he served as the Secretary of Treasury in the government of Mario García Menocal. He created the Cuban bank system, which became law on October 29, 1914, based on the gold standard. He resigned in December 1920.

He died on 1 May 1927 in Havana.

== Family ==
He was the son of Ramon Cancio y Venegas and Rita Luna y Estrada. On November 28, 1879, he married Maria Secondaria del Carmen Sanchez y Toledo and they had six children.
