= Roberto Robaina González =

Cuban politician

Roberto Robaina-Gonzalez

Minister of Foreign Affairs of Cuba
- In office 1993–1999
- Preceded by: Ricardo Alarcón
- Succeeded by: Felipe Pérez Roque

Personal details
- Born: 18 March 1956 (age 70) Pinar del Río, Cuba
- Party: Communist Party of Cuba

Roberto Robaina González (born 18 March 1956) was the Foreign Minister of Cuba from 1993 until 1999.

== Career ==
In 1993, at the age of 37 he became Foreign Minister. In 1999 he was removed on accusations of wrongdoing in his relationships with foreign business leaders and officials.

He studied Pedagogy, with emphasis in Mathematics. His approach to the world of fine arts is produced through his personal involvement as a hobby in the design of visual propaganda for working with students and youth.

Since 2004 he is an independent artist, dedicated to painting, photography and graphic design.

Much of his work is in private collections in countries like Spain, Mexico, Italy, Panama, Venezuela, the Dominican Republic, United States, Puerto Rico, Argentina, Uruguay, Chile, France, Switzerland, Russia, Canada, Colombia and Cuba.
