= Juan Carlos García Granda =

Cuban official

Minister of Tourism
- Incumbent
- Assumed office 22 December 2019
- President: Miguel Díaz-Canel
- Prime Minister: Manuel Marrero Cruz
- Preceded by: Manuel Marrero Cruz

Personal details
- Born: 5 January 1963 (age 63) Cienfuegos, Cuba
- Party: Communist Party of Cuba

Juan Carlos García Granda is a Cuban state official currently serving as the Minister of Tourism of Cuba. He served as first deputy minister under former Minister of Tourism Manuel Marrero Cruz until Cruz's appointment to the office of Prime Minister in December 2019.

== Career ==
García has advocated for the construction of additional "emblematic" luxury hotels in the country. In November 2019, he inaugurated the Paseo del Prado Hotel in Havana in the company of the former First Secretary of the Communist Party of Cuba, Raúl Castro, and the President of Cuba, Miguel Díaz-Canel. He has also advocated for the strengthening of bilateral ties with Canada, which ranks first among the issuers of visitors.
