= Ministry of Science, Technology and Environment (Cuba) =

Government ministry of Cuba

Ministry of Science, Technology and Environment of the Republic of Cuba
- Ministerio de Ciencia, Tecnología y Medio Ambiente de la República de Cuba (CITMA)

Agency overview
- Formed: 1994; 32 years ago
- Headquarters: Calle Línea 8 entre N y O, Vedado, Havana
- Minister responsible: Elba Rosa Pérez Montoya (PCC)
- Website: Official website

The Ministry of Science, Technology and Environment of the Republic of Cuba (Spanish: Ministerio de Ciencia, Tecnología y Medio Ambiente de la República de Cuba), also known as CITMA, is the Cuban government ministry which oversees state politics in matters of science, technology, environment and the usage of nuclear energy. Its headquarter is in a building of Calle Línea, a street of central Havana next to the Malecón, and part of Vedado, a ward of the municipal borough of Plaza de la Revolución.

== History ==
It was founded in 1994, as successor of the Cuban Academy of Sciences. The current minister, Elba Rosa Pérez Montoya, in office from 2012, was preceded by José Miguel Miyar Barruecos, minister from March 2009 to March 2012.

== Functions ==
CITMA promotes environmental policy and scientific research, as the peaceful usage of nuclear energy, in a coherent integration and coordinated way to contribute to the sustainable development of the state. Besides the common attributions to all the organisms of the central administration of the state, it has the following attributions and specific functions:

- Propose and evaluate the strategy and the scientific and technological policies in correspondence with the economic and social development of the country, establishing the objectives, priorities, lines and programs that correspond and direct and control their execution.
- Direct and control the process of preparation, execution and evaluation of scientific research and technological innovation programs.
- Promote and facilitate the participation of the scientific community in the development and evaluation of science and technology strategies and policies.
- Propose the strategy and policies to follow for the process of developing the plan and the budget for science and technological innovation in accordance with the approved priorities.
- Direct, coordinate and control the process of integration of scientific, technological, productive and other factors; in the generation and usage of scientific-technical knowledge, through scientific centres and other forms of integration related to prioritized activities.

== Agencies ==
This Cuban ministry delegates its functions to numerous agencies, centers and institutions related to its management area, among which are:

- Environment Agency (Agencia de Medio Ambiente, AMA)
- Center for Information, Management and Environmental Education (Centro de Información, Gestión y Educación Ambiental, CIGEA)
- Institute of Geophysics and Astronomy (Instituto de Geofísica y Astronomía, IGA)
- Institute of Tropical Geography (Instituto de Geografía Tropical, IGT)
- Institute of Meteorology (Instituto de Meteorología, INSMET)
- Center of Inspection and Environmental Control (Centro de Inspección y Control Ambiental, CICA)
- National System of Protected Areas of Cuba (Sistema Nacional de Áreas Protegidas de Cuba, SNAP)

== See also ==
- Council of Ministers of Cuba
- Ministry of the Interior (MININT)
- Ministry of Foreign Affairs (MINREX)
