= Antonio Enrique Lussón Batlle =

Cuban military officer (1930–2022)

- Born: 1930; Santiago de Cuba, Republic of Cuba
- Died: 21 September 2022 (aged 92)
- Occupation: Military Officer

Antonio Enrique Lussón Batlle (1930 – 21 September 2022) was a Cuban military officer and one of four Vice Presidents of the Council of Ministers.

== Biography ==
Batlle was born in Santiago de Cuba to a financially stable family. and he obtained a good education, but he was not able to finish high school due to economic problems. He then worked as a farmer, a "pequeño colono," a truck driver, and a peddler. He was a member of the Partido Ortodoxo and after Batista's military coup, he engaged in underground activities in the Organización Auténtica (OA). He left the organization later and joined the MR-26 July. He joined the guerrillas, as a sergeant, under the command of Raúl Castro. Considered an excellent tactician with exceptional personal courage, in less than six months he became a comandante and was entrusted with one independent guerrilla column that had one of the best fighting records until December 1958. He was second-in-command to Juan Almeida in 1959 at Managua Garrison and for several months was the Chief of Logistics. He also distinguished himself at Bay of Pigs Invasion.

For most of the 1960s, he was chief of the Western Independent Army Corps. His military education consists of two courses: Officers Basic Training and a Higher Course at El Morro Academy (predecessor to the current "Máximo Gómez" Academy). He was Minister of Transportation, Merchant Marine, and Ports from 1970 to 1980. The first five years of his administration were considered successful, with major projects and investments, but by the late 1970s public transportation was in the same condition as in the late 1960s. Fidel Castro, frustrated with his performance, ousted him and sent him to the Youth Labor Army (Ejército Juvenil del Trabajo or EJT) to command Camaguey's army corps. Two years later, he was sent to Angola for the first time. He spent seven years in Angola. From 1982 to 1985 as top commander of LCB forces against UNITA and from 1986 to 1989 as military commander of Luena Province.

Batlle was Vice President of INRE from 1990 to 1996. He is the Division General and Chief of the Special Forces Directorate of the Cuban Revolutionary Army since 1998. Extensively decorated, he is considered a Hero of the Republic of Cuba.

Batlle died on 21 September 2022, at the age of 92.
