= Rodrigo Malmierca Díaz =

Cuban politician

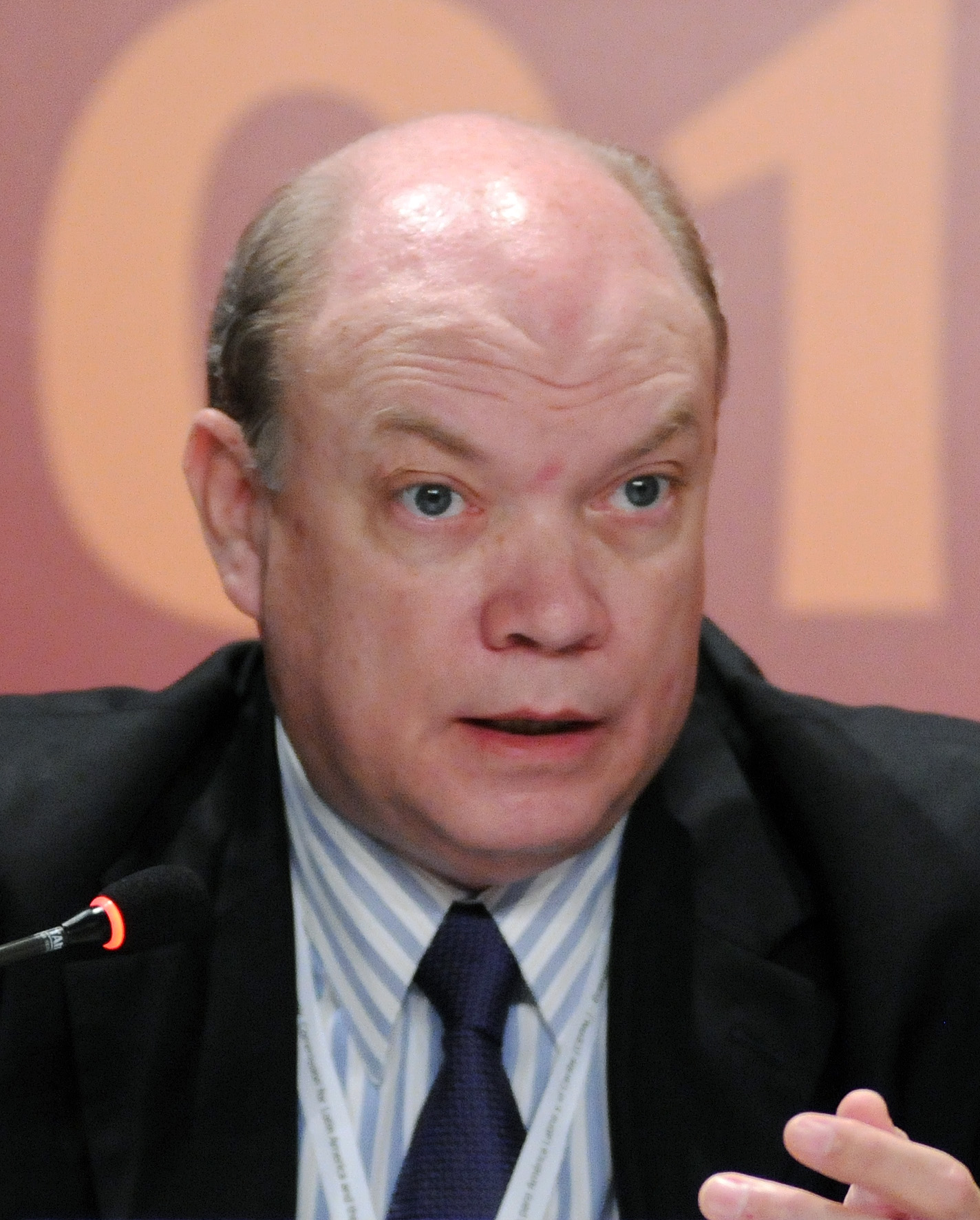

Minister of Foreign Trade and Investment
- Incumbent
- Assumed office March 2009
- Preceded by: Raúl de la Nuez

Personal details
- Born: October 14, 1956 (age 70) Havana, Cuba
- Party: Communist Party of Cuba
- Spouse: Grisell Guadalupe Castano-Rey

Rodrigo Malmierca Díaz (born October 14, 1956, in Havana) is a Cuban diplomat and politician. Malmierca is the Cuban Minister of Foreign Trade and Foreign Investment (2009–present) as a result of the 2009 shake-up by Raúl Castro. He was the Permanent Representative of Cuba to the United Nations from 2005 to 2009. He is married to Grisell Guadalupe Castano-Rey and they have two children.

== Education ==
Ambassador Malmierca Díaz graduated in economics at the University of Havana in 1980. He followed with several postgraduate courses, including at the Higher Institute of International Relations in Havana in international relations and negotiation techniques; at the External Trade Institute of the Ministry of Foreign Trade in Havana, in foreign trade, and at the Economic Commission for Latin America and the Caribbean (CEPAL) and Centro de Investigación y Docencia Económica (CIDE) (Economic Research Centre) in Mexico City, in economic alternatives for Latin America. He speaks four languages: Spanish, English, French and Portuguese.

== Political life ==
Prior to his appointment to the UN, from 2002 to 2005 was Cuba's Ambassador to Belgium, the European Union and Luxembourg. From 1998 to 2002, he served as Deputy Minister in his country's Ministry of Foreign Investment and Economic Cooperation in Havana. In that same Ministry, he served as Director of the European and North American Division from 1997 to 1998. Prior to this, he was Counsellor in charge of economic and trade affairs at the Cuban Embassy in Brasília, Brazil, from 1992 to 1997. From 1982 to 1992 he was Specialist of Cooperation in the Division of Economic International Institutions of the State Committee for Economic Cooperation in Havana. He started his career in 1981 in Project Management of the ECIMETAL Enterprise, also in Havana.

Diplomatic posts
Preceded by Orlando Requeijo Gual	Permanent Representative of Cuba to the United Nations; 2005–2009	Succeeded by Abelardo Moreno Fernández
Political offices
Preceded by Raúl de la Nuez	Minister of Foreign Trade and Investment; March 2009–present	Succeeded by Incumbent
