= Romárico Sotomayor García =

Cuban military officer and politician (1938–2024)

Member of the National Assembly of People's Power
- In office 24 February 2008 – 24 February 2013

Personal details
- Born: 4 November 1938 Bartolomé Masó, Oriente Province, Cuba
- Died: 1 September 2024 (aged 85) Havana, Cuba
- Party: PCC
- Occupation: Military officer

Romárico Vidal Sotomayor García (4 November 1938 – 1 September 2024) was a Cuban military officer and politician. A member of the Communist Party of Cuba, he served in the National Assembly of People's Power from 2008 to 2013.

Sotomayor died in Havana on 1 September 2024, at the age of 85.
