= Elba Rosa Pérez Montoya =

Cuban politician

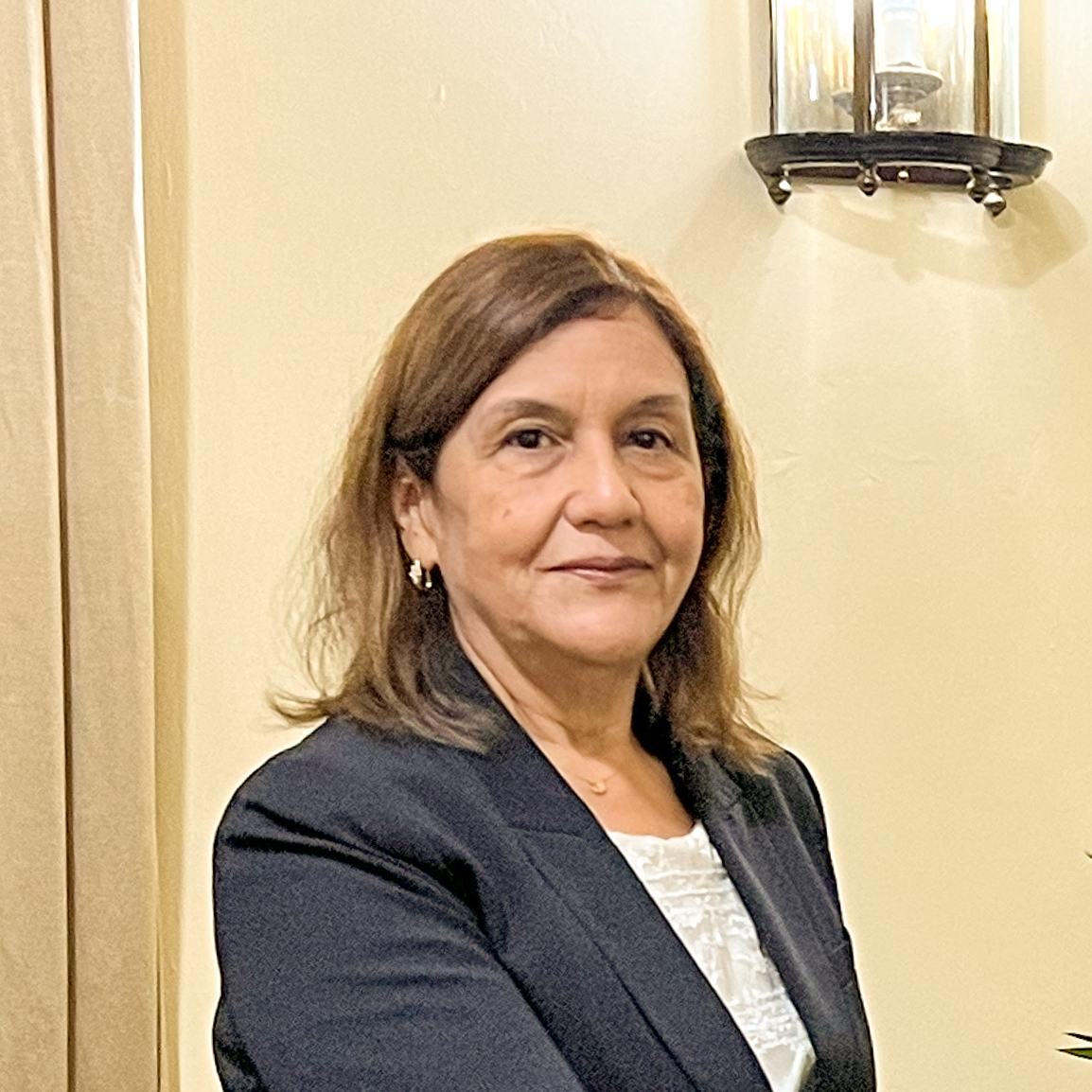
- Born: 20 November 1960 (age 65)
- Known for: Minister of Science, Technology and the Environment

Elba Rosa Pérez Montoya (born November 20, 1960) is a Cuban politician and academic. She served as Cuba's Minister of Science, Technology and the Environment for 11 years until being replaced by Eduardo Martínez in February 2024.

== Life ==
Pérez Montoya was born in 1960. She began her career in academia, working as a professor, senior professor, vice dean of research and eventually head of the Faculty of Humanities at the University of Oriente in Santiago. She also held the role of professional secretary general of the University Party Committee.

Pérez Montoya is a member of the Communist Party of Cuba and served as a representative in the National Assembly for Granma Province. She became the Minister of Science, Technology and the Environment in 2012.

In 2018 she was re-elected as a Deputy to Cuba's National Assembly of People's Power at Havana's Convention Center.

In 2019 the Cuban Prime Minister, Manuel Marrero Cruz, ratified Minister Pérez Montoya as a member of his council of ministers.
