= 6th Congress of the Communist Party of Cuba =

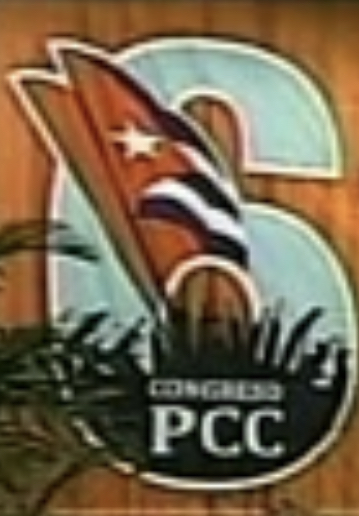
Logo of the 6th Congress

The 6th Congress of the Communist Party of Cuba, the governing political party of Cuba, took place on April 16 – 19, 2011, in Havana at the Palacio de las Convenciones. The main focus of the congress was to introduce economic, social, and political reforms in order to modernize the country's socialist system. The Congress also elected Raúl Castro as First Secretary, the position vacant since Fidel Castro's stepping down in 2006.

== Background ==
The Party hadn't convened since 1997, when Cuba's economy was undergoing a severe depression, known as the Special Period. Nevertheless, no significant economic reforms emerged during the Fifth Congress. The 6th Congress had been scheduled for 2009, but was postponed due to the global economic crisis. On November 9, 2010 the Draft Guidelines of the Economic and Social Policy of the Party and the Revolution were released, followed by a period of public discussions and consultations between December 1, 2010 to February 28, 2011. According to the Cuban government, 8.9 million people were involved in this phase, resulting in changes to 68% of the guidelines and increasing their number from 291 to 311.

== Organization ==
The congress was opened on April 16 with a large military parade in Havana, commemorating the fiftieth anniversary of thwarting the Bay of Pigs Invasion. It was followed by the President of Cuba and the party's Second Secretary Raúl Castro's presentation of the Central Report. In terms of economics, some of the key notes include proposal to gradually abolish the practice of distributing subsidized goods by means of rationing, blamed for hoarding and providing disincentive to work, while firmly rejecting the idea of a shock therapy. Concerning the non-strategic parts of the economy, Castro talked about the benefits of reducing the role of the public sector, as well as of decentralization and deregulation.

The speech also addressed the need for political reforms, including the suggestion to limit those holding high political offices to two five-year terms in order to rejuvenate the country's institutions.

On April 17 – 18, 997 delegates, representing some 800,000 party members, divided into five commissions, debated on the Draft Economic and Social Guidelines and approved the Central Report.

On April 19, the delegates approved 313 guidelines from the Draft, having modified 86 and added 2. Raúl Castro was elected to be the party's First Secretary, while the position of the Second Secretary went to José Ramón Machado Ventura, Cuba's First Vice President. Members of the Central Committee, Secretariat, and the Politburo were elected as well, while the size of the latter was reduced from 24 to 15 members. During the closing ceremony- attended by Fidel Castro, making a rare appearance- Raúl Castro expressed satisfaction with the results of the Congress, stating that the reforms are to be gradually implemented over a five-year period.
