= José Amado Ricardo Guerra =

Secretary of Council of Ministers in Cuba

José Amado Ricardo Guerra is the Secretary of Council of Ministers in Cuba. He was appointed as part of the 2009 shake-up by Raúl Castro.
