= Lina Olinda Pedraza Rodríguez =

Cuban politician

Cuban Minister of Finances and Prices
- In office March 2009 – 9 January 2019
- President: Raul Castro
- Preceded by: Georgina Barreiro Fajardo
- Succeeded by: Meisi Bolaños Weiss

Personal details
- Born: 16 September 1955
- Party: Communist Party of Cuba

Lina Olinda Pedraza Rodríguez (born 1955) is a Cuban politician and was the Cuban Minister of Finances and Prices from 2009 to 2019. She was appointed after 2009 shake-up by Raúl Castro.

== Education and career ==
Pedraza has a bachelor's degree in economic control. She served in Villa Clara, in the banking sector and at the Ministry of Finance and Prices. She was minister of Audits and Control from 2001 to 2006, when she was promoted to member of the Secretariat and Head of the Economics Department of the Central Committee of the Communist Party of Cuba (CCPCC). She is also a deputy at the National Assembly of Popular Power.
