= Council of Ministers (Cuba) =

Highest executive and administrative organ of Cuba

The Council of Ministers (Spanish: Consejo de ministros), also referred to as simply the Cabinet of Cuba, constitutes the nation's government. It consists of an Executive Committee which includes the Prime Minister and five Deputy Prime Ministers, the Secretary of the Executive Committee. The full council includes the executive committee as well as the heads of the national ministries, and other members as established by law.

The Council of Ministers is responsible for the implementation of policy agreements authorized by the National Assembly of People’s Power. These agreements are designated to individual ministries. The council also proposes general plans for economic and social development, which are in turn authorized by the National Assembly twice yearly.

The Council of Ministers also directs Cuba's foreign policy and its relations with other governments; approves international treaties before passing them over for ratification of the Council of State; directs and oversees foreign trade and the State budget. The Council of Ministers enforces laws authorized by the National Assembly, which are passed by the Council of State.

As a result of a referendum which was held on February 24, 2019, the Council of Ministers, and its power over the Cuban government, will be led by a Prime Minister. While the Presidency, consisting of the President and Vice-President, is now distinct from the Council of Ministers.

== Current members ==
The body, was reformed in December 2019 with the appointment of Manuel Marrero Cruz as Prime Minister - the first with that title in 43 years - and six new ministers.

The President and Vice-President of Cuba, Miguel Díaz-Canel Bermúdez and Salvador Antonio Valdés Mesa are distinct from the Council of Ministers.

As of March 16, 2026, it consists of:

=== Executive Committee ===
Office	Incumbent
Prime Minister	Manuel Marrero Cruz
Deputy Prime Ministers	Ramiro Valdés Menéndez
Deputy Prime Ministers	Eduardo Martínez Díaz
Deputy Prime Ministers	Inés María Chapman Waugh
Deputy Prime Ministers	Jorge Luis Tapia Fonseca
Deputy Prime Ministers	Oscar Pérez-Oliva Fraga also Minister of Foreign Trade and Investment
Secretary	José Amado Ricardo Guerra

=== Members ===
Listed in the order listed on the official website of the Government of the Republic of Cuba.

Department	Acronym	Incumbent minister
Ministry of Education	MINED	Naima Ariatna Trujillo Barreto
Ministry of Domestic Trade	MINCIN	Betsy Díaz Velázquez
Ministry of Industry	MINDUS	Eloy Alvarez Martínez
Ministry of the Interior	MININT	Lázaro Alberto Álvarez Casas
Ministry of Transportation	MITRANS	Eduardo Rodríguez Dávila
Ministry of Public Health	MINSAP	José Ángel Portal Miranda
Ministry of Justice	MINJUS	Oscar Manuel Silveira Martínez
Ministry of Energy and Mines	MINEM	Vicente de la O Levy
Ministry of Culture	MINCULT	Alpidio Alonso Grau
Ministry of Communications	MINCOM	Mayra Arevich Marín
Ministry of Foreign Trade and Investment	MINCEX	Oscar Pérez-Oliva Fraga also Deputy Prime Minister
Ministry of Food Industry	MINAL	Alberto López Díaz
Ministry of Construction	MICONS	Rene Mesa Villafana
Ministry of Finance and Prices	MFP	Vladimir Regueiro Ale
Ministry of Higher Education	MES	Walter Baluja García
National Hydraulic Resources Institute	INRH	Antonio Rodríguez Rodríguez
National Institute for Sports, Physical Education and Recreation	INDER	Osvaldo Caridad Vento Montiller
Ministry of Science, Technology and Environment	CITMA	Armando Rodríguez Batista
Ministry of Economy and Planning	MEP	Joaquín Alonso Vázquez
Ministry of Foreign Affairs (list)	MINREX	Bruno Eduardo Rodríguez Parrilla
Ministry of Tourism	MINTUR	Juan Carlos García Granda
Ministry of Agriculture	MINAG	Ydael Jesús Pérez Brito
Ministry of the Revolutionary Armed Forces	MINFAR	Álvaro López Miera
Institute of Information and Social Communication	ICS	Alfonso Noya Martínez
National Institute of Territorial and Urban Planning	INOTU	Raúl Acosta Gregorich
Central Bank of Cuba	BCC	Juana Lilia Delgado Portal
Ministry of Labor and Social Security	MTSS	vacant

== See also ==
- List of prime ministers of Cuba
