= Bruno Rodríguez Parrilla =

Cuban diplomat and politician

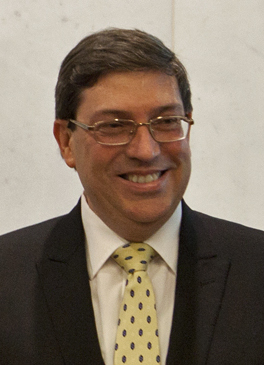

Minister of Foreign Affairs
- Incumbent
- Assumed office 2 March 2009
- President: Raúl Castro; Miguel Díaz-Canel
- Prime Minister: Manuel Marrero Cruz
- Preceded by: Felipe Pérez Roque

Personal details
- Born: Bruno Eduardo Rodríguez Parrilla; 22 January 1958 (age 68) Mexico City, Mexico
- Occupation: Lawyer

Bruno Eduardo Rodríguez Parrilla (born 22 January 1958) is a Cuban diplomat and politician. He is a member of the Politburo of the Communist Party of Cuba, and has served as Cuba's Minister of Foreign Affairs since 2009.

== Biography and career ==
Rodríguez was born in Mexico City to engineer José María Rodríguez Padilla who held high positions in the Cuban government.

He was President of the Federation of High School Students (FEEM) and leader of the Federation of University Students (FEU). Graduated with a Law Degree, he was a professor of Public International Law at the University of Havana. In 1986, he was elected Secretary of International Affairs of the National Committee of the Young Communist League (UJC), and in 1991, he was appointed director of the newspaper Juventud Rebelde.

He served in the Republic of Angola as an officer in the Revolutionary Armed Forces.

== Involvement in Cuban diplomacy ==
Rodríguez Parrilla served as Cuba's Permanent Representative to the United Nations from 1995 to 2003. He was appointed Minister of Foreign Affairs on March 2, 2009, replacing Felipe Pérez Roque, after serving as the Vice-Minister. This was a result of the 2009 shake-up by Raúl Castro.

Bruno Rodriguez Parrilla

On 25 October 2011, Rodríguez Parrilla addressed the United Nations General Assembly right before the annual non-binding vote calling for the United States to end its embargo against Cuba.

On 20 July 2015, Rodríguez attended the reinauguration of the Cuban Embassy in Washington, D.C., making him the first Cuban Minister of Foreign Affairs to visit the United States on a diplomatic mission since 1958.

== Awards ==
- Order of Prince Yaroslav the Wise 3rd degree (26 April 2011, Ukraine)

== See also ==
- List of foreign ministers in 2017
- List of current foreign ministers

Diplomatic posts
Preceded by Fernando Remírez de Estenoz	Permanent Representative of Cuba to the United Nations; 1995 – 2003	Succeeded by Orlando Requeijo Gual
Political offices
Preceded by Felipe Pérez Roque	Foreign Minister of Cuba; 2009 – present	Succeeded by Incumbent
