= Manuel Marrero Cruz =

Prime Minister of Cuba since 2019

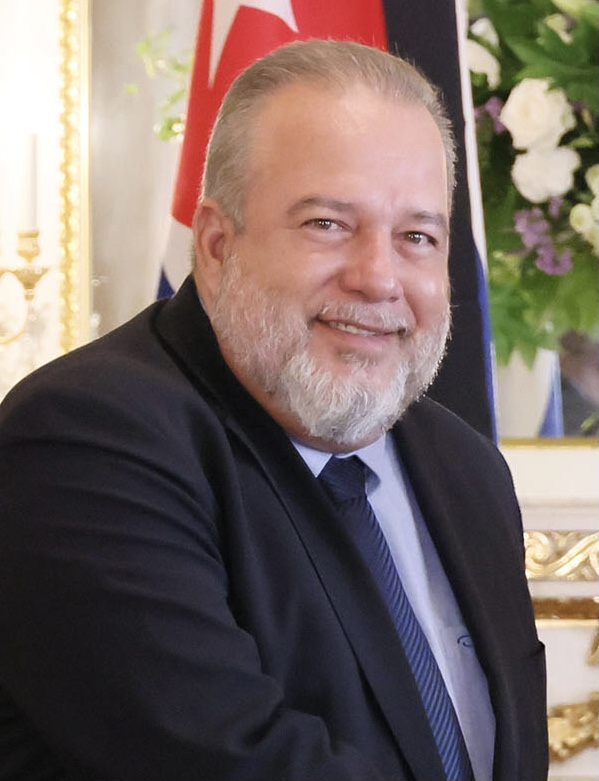
- Marrero in 2022

18th Prime Minister of Cuba
- Incumbent
- Assumed office 21 December 2019
- President: Miguel Díaz-Canel
- Deputy: Óscar Pérez-Oliva Fraga
- Preceded by: Miguel Díaz-Canel (President of the Council of Ministers); Fidel Castro (1976)

Minister of Tourism
- In office 2004 – 21 December 2019
- President: Fidel Castro; Raúl Castro; Miguel Díaz-Canel
- Preceded by: Ibrahim Ferradaz
- Succeeded by: Juan Carlos García Grada

Member of the National Assembly of People's Power
- Incumbent
- Assumed office 19 April 2023
- Constituency: Holguín

Personal details
- Born: Manuel Marrero Cruz; 11 July 1963 (age 63) Holguín, Cuba
- Party: Communist Party

Military service
- Allegiance: Cuba
- Branch/service: Cuban Revolutionary Army
- Rank: Colonel

Manuel Marrero Cruz (born 11 July 1963) is a Cuban politician who has served as prime minister of Cuba since 2019. He was the first prime minister appointed after the position was abolished in 1976 and reestablished in a constitutional referendum. A member of the Communist Party of Cuba, he served as minister of tourism from 2004 until his appointment as prime minister. During his tenure as minister for tourism, Cuba underwent a massive boost in tourism. Marrero is an architect and worked in Gaviota, the tourism arm of the Cuban military, where he also held the rank of colonel.

== Early life and career ==
Manuel Marrero Cruz was born in July 1963, in the eastern province of Holguín. He is an architect by training and joined the tourism industry in 1990. He began as an investor in the Gaviota Group and later was head of the technical investment group, deputy director and general director of the Río de Luna hotel and then deputy delegate of Gaviota for the eastern provinces. He was general director of the Varadero Azul hotel complex, first vice president and finally president of Gaviota. In 2004, he took over the Ministry of Tourism, appointed by Fidel Castro. He remained in office until December 2019 when he was named Prime Minister of Cuba. His successor in the Ministry of Tourism was Juan Carlos García Grada.

== Prime Minister of Cuba (2019–present) ==
=== Appointment ===
Following the 2019 Cuban constitutional referendum, the office of Prime Minister of Cuba was reinstated for the first time since Fidel Castro last occupied it in 1976. President Miguel Díaz-Canel formally nominated Marrero to serve as Prime Minister, and his nomination as PM was unanimously ratified by 594 deputies of the National Assembly.

Soon after his appointment, controversy arose due to his son's opulent lifestyle, which contrasted with the daily life of the Cuban population.

The term limit for prime ministers under the new Cuban constitution is five years. Four years later he was also re-elected to the National Assembly of People's Power. At the first session, in the spring of 2023, he was again re-elected as head of the Cuban government.

Political offices
Vacant Title last held by Fidel Castro	Prime Minister of Cuba; 2019–present	Incumbent
