= Nogueras (surname) =

Nogueras is a Spanish surname. Notable people with the surname include:

- Joaquín Nogueras (1906–1991), Spanish military and equestrian
- José Nogueras (born 1951), composer, music producer, singer, guitarist, and performer of modern-day Puerto Rican music
- Míriam Nogueras (born 1980), Spanish businesswoman and politician
- Stephanie Nogueras (born 1989), American actress
- Olance Nogueras Rofes (born 1967), Spanish journalist

== See also ==
- Noguera (surname)
