= Nagera =

Nagera, or Nágera, is a surname. Notable people with the surname include:

- Kenny Nagera (born 2002), French footballer
- María Vallejo-Nágera (born 1964), Spanish novelist
- Samantha Vallejo-Nágera (born 1969), Spanish chef, TV host, and businesswoman

== See also ==
- Nogueira (disambiguation)
