= Matheus Nogueira =

Matheus Nogueira may refer to:

- Matheus Nogueira da Silva (born 1986), Brazilian football goalkeeper
- Matheus Vinícius Matos Nogueira (born 1997), Brazilian football goalkeeper

== See also ==
- Matheus
- Nogueira
