= Noguera (surname) =

Noguera is a Spanish surname. Notable people with the surname include:

- Alberto Noguera (born 1989), Spanish footballer
- Amparo Noguera (born 1965), Chilean television and film actress
- Antonio Noguera (born 1988), Venezuelan baseball player
- Carlos Noguera (1943–2015), Venezuelan writer and psychologist
- Elsa Noguera (born 1973), Colombian politician
- Fabián Noguera (born 1993), Argentine footballer
- Félix Noguera (born 1987), Colombian footballer
- Gonzalo Noguera (born 1977), Uruguayan footballer
- Gustavo Noguera (born 1987), Paraguayan footballer
- Héctor Noguera (1937–2025), Chilean television, theatre and film actor, and theatre director
- Jesús Noguera (born 1990), Spanish professional darts player
- Jorge Noguera Cotes (born 1963), Colombian politician and convicted criminal
- José Miguel Noguera (1913–1954), Argentine footballer
- Junior Noguera (born 2002), Paraguayan footballer
- Lucas Noguera Paz (born 1993), Argentine rugby union player
- Luis Noguera (born 1973), Venezuelan taekwondo practitioner
- Mónica Noguera (born 1971), Mexican television personality
- Pedro Noguera (born 1959), American sociologist
- Pere Noguera (born 1941), Spanish artist

== See also ==
- Nogueira, the Portuguese variant
