= Palacio del Valle =

Historic villa in Cienfuegos, Cuba

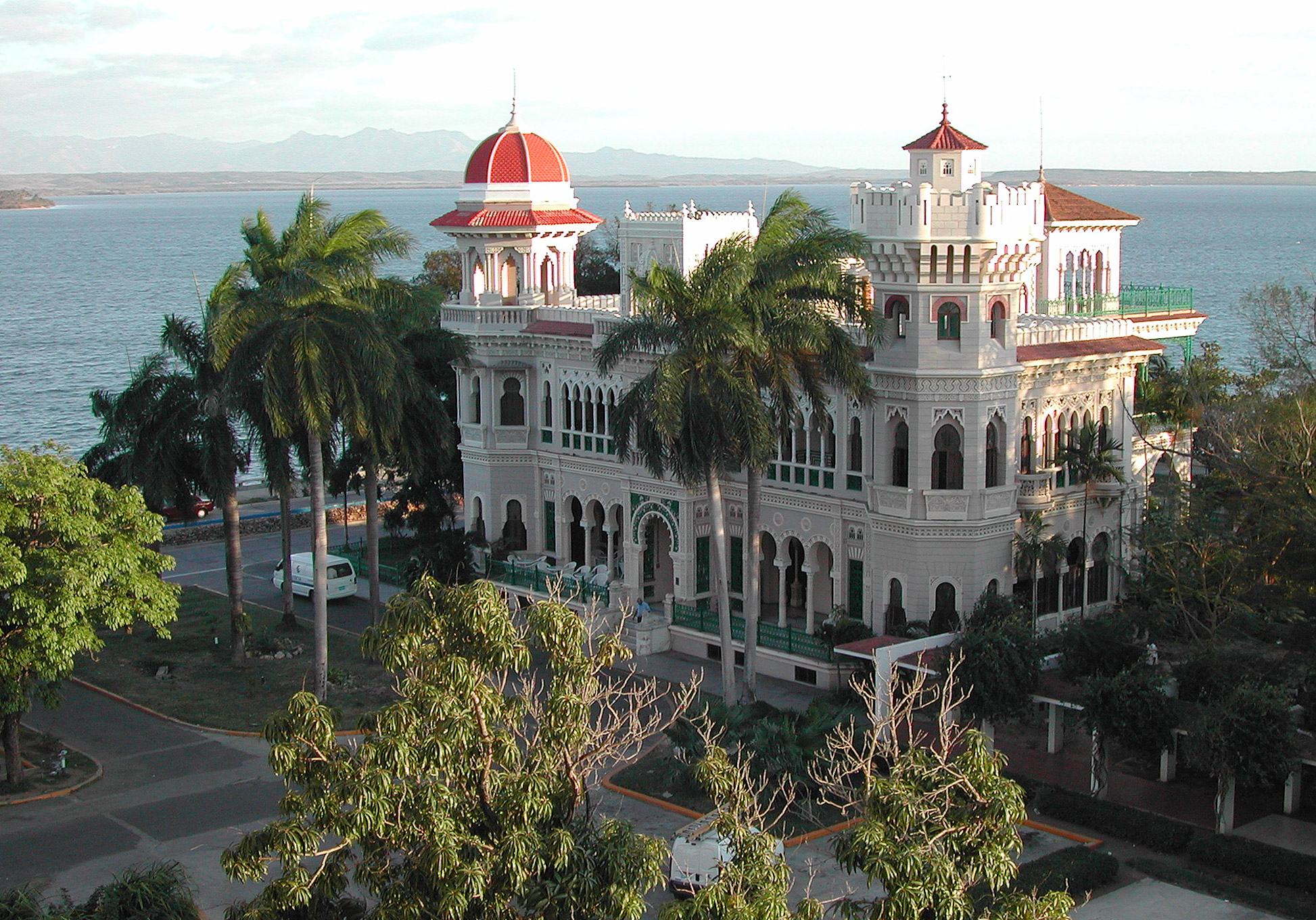
The Palacio del Valle

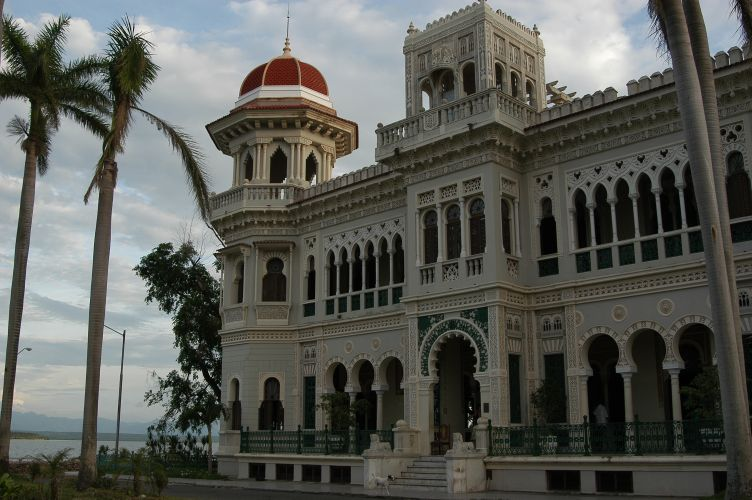
The Palacio del Valle, main facade

The Palacio del Valle is a historic villa in Cienfuegos, Cuba, built by the Italian architect Alfredo Colli, from 1913 to 1917. It is reminiscent of Moorish architecture.

The original client of the villa was the Cuban merchant Celestino Caces, who then sold it to Asturian-born Acisclo del Valle Blanco, who had its construction completed. Today, the villa is occupied by an upscale hotel and restaurant.

In 2000, it was declared a National Monument by the board.

== Gallery ==
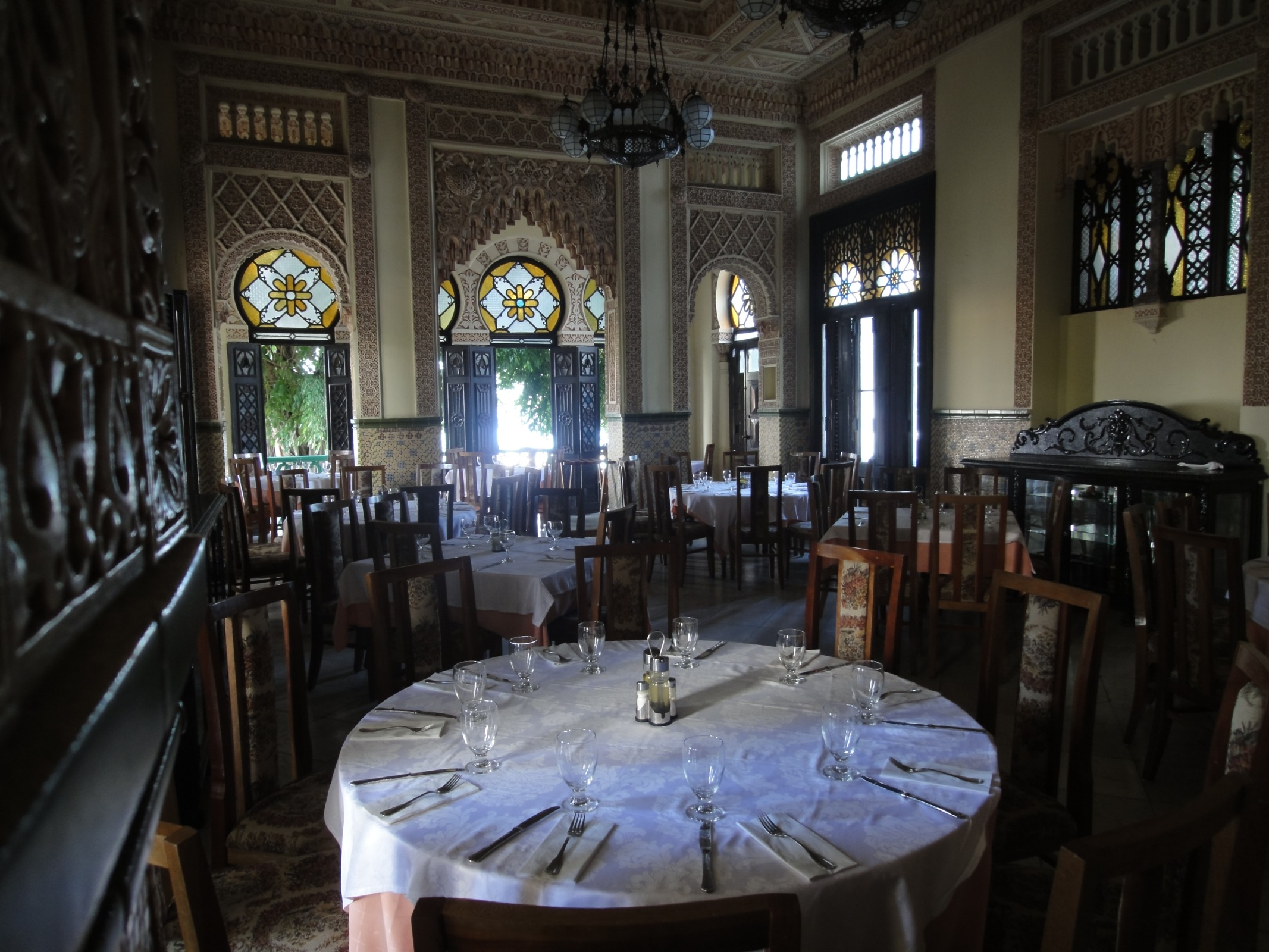
Moorish revival interior

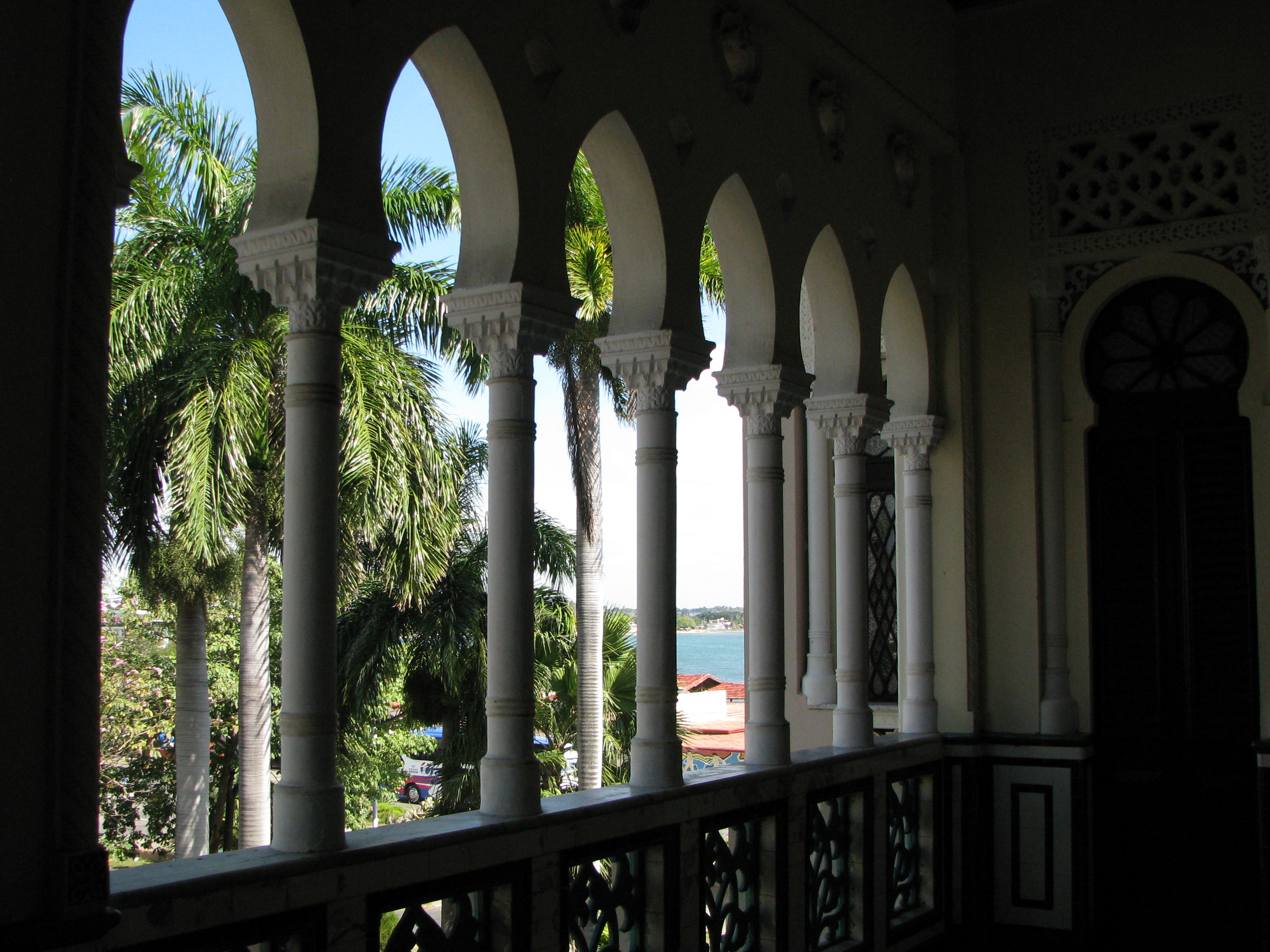
Arcades

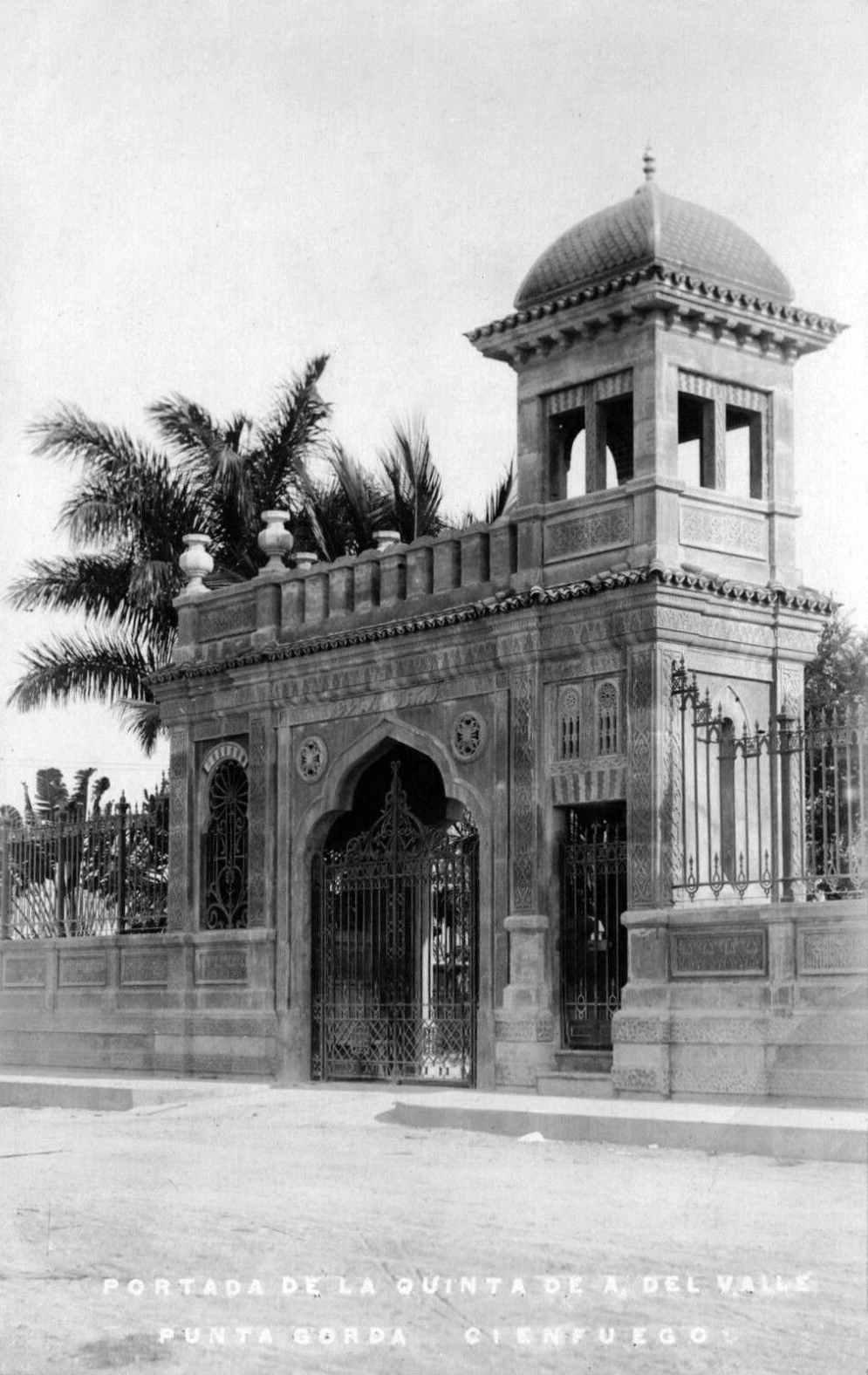
Entrance of the palace, photo from 1920

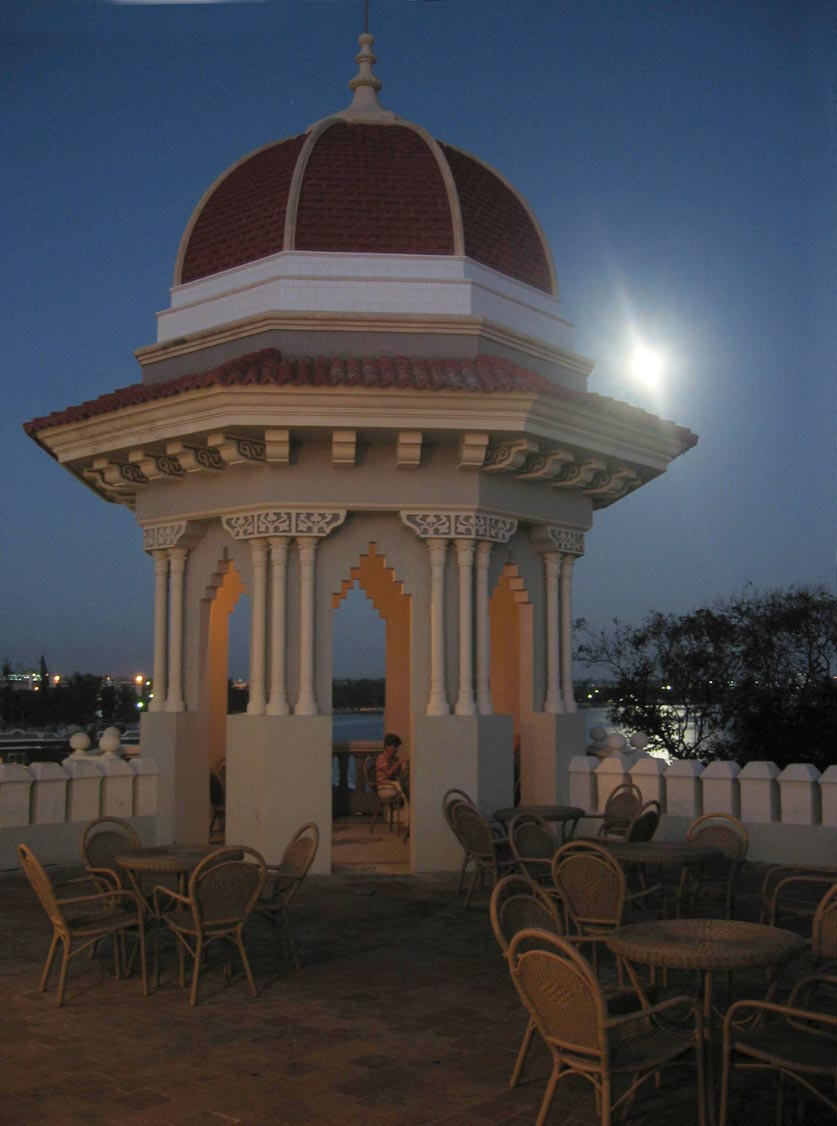
One of the pavilions with turret on the moonlit roof

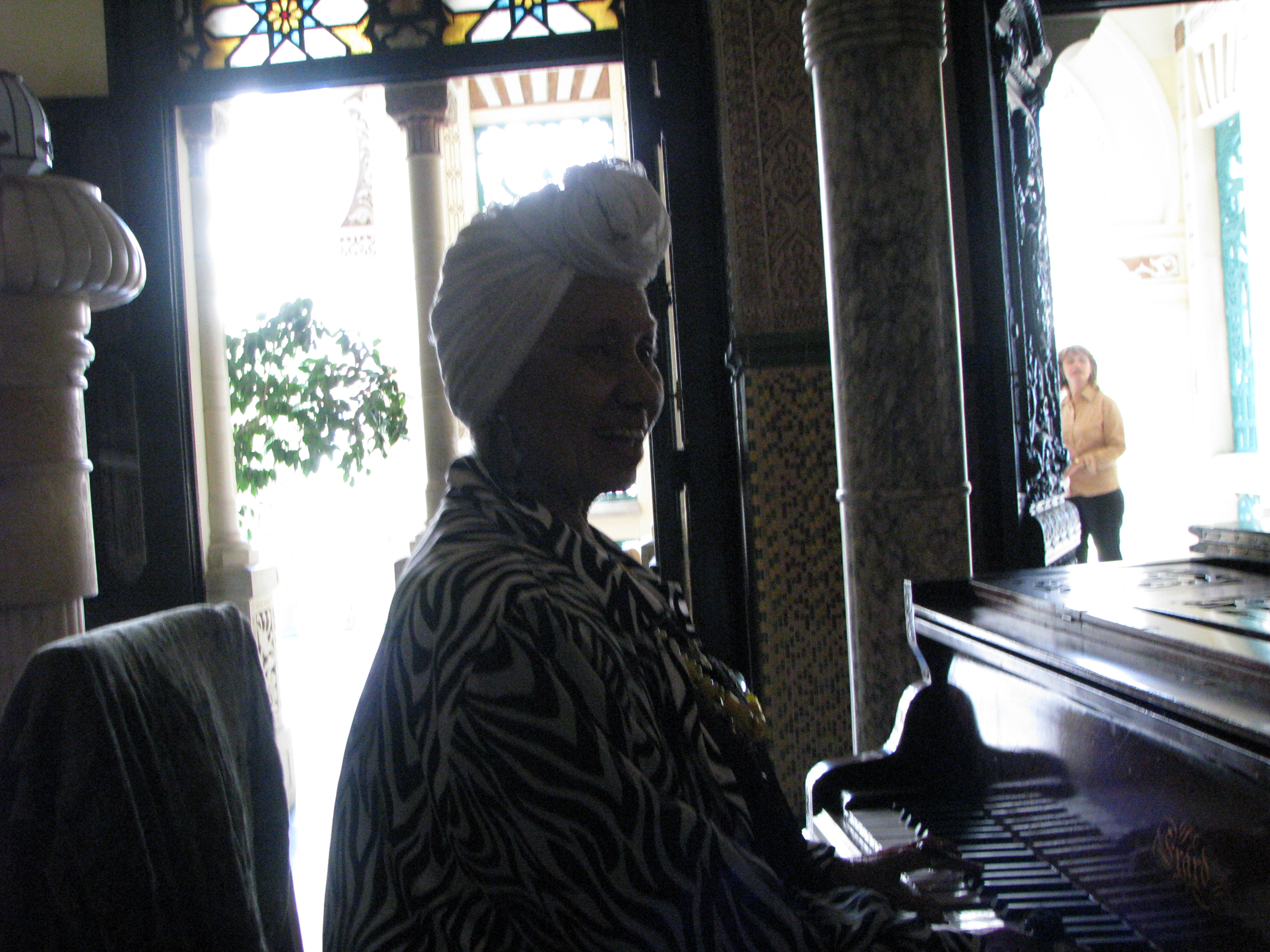
Pianist at the palacio in 2011

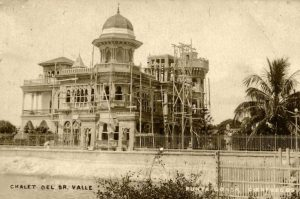
Palacio del Valle in construction, in 1915

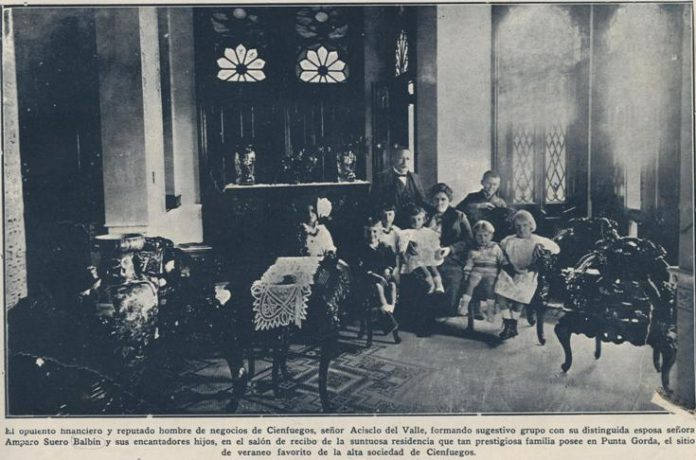
Acisclo del Valle Blanco, wife and children inside the Palacio del Valle

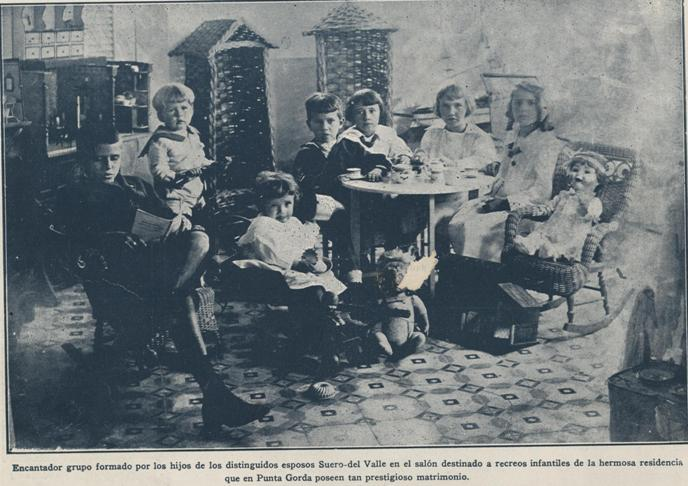
Acisclo del Valle's seven children inside the Palacio del Valle

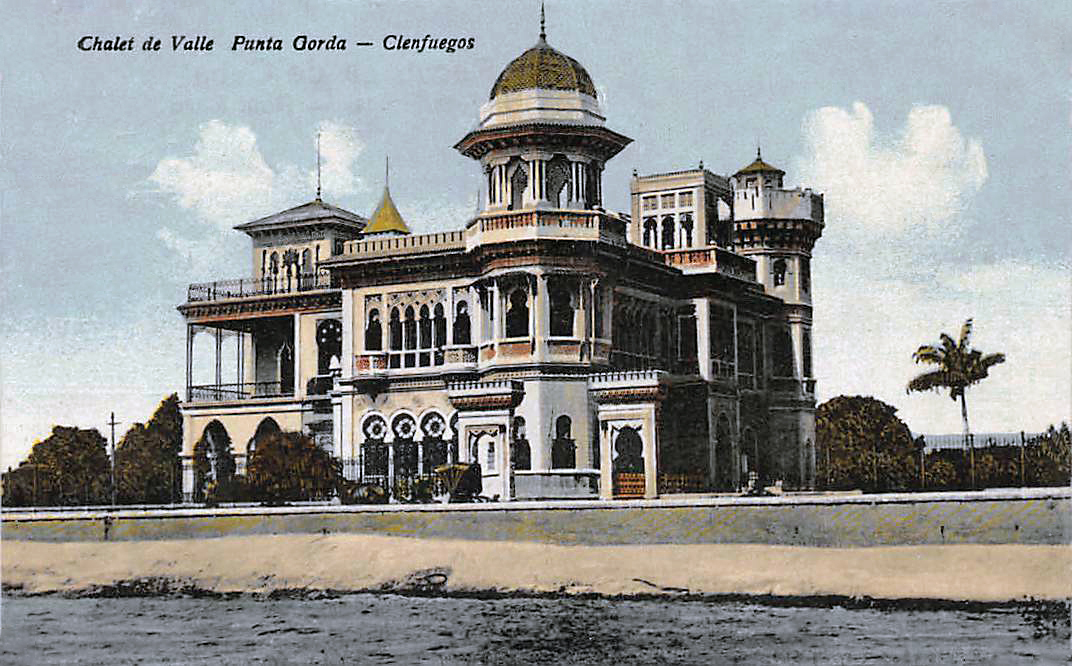
Palacio del Valle, 1920
