= Cienfuegos =

- Municipality
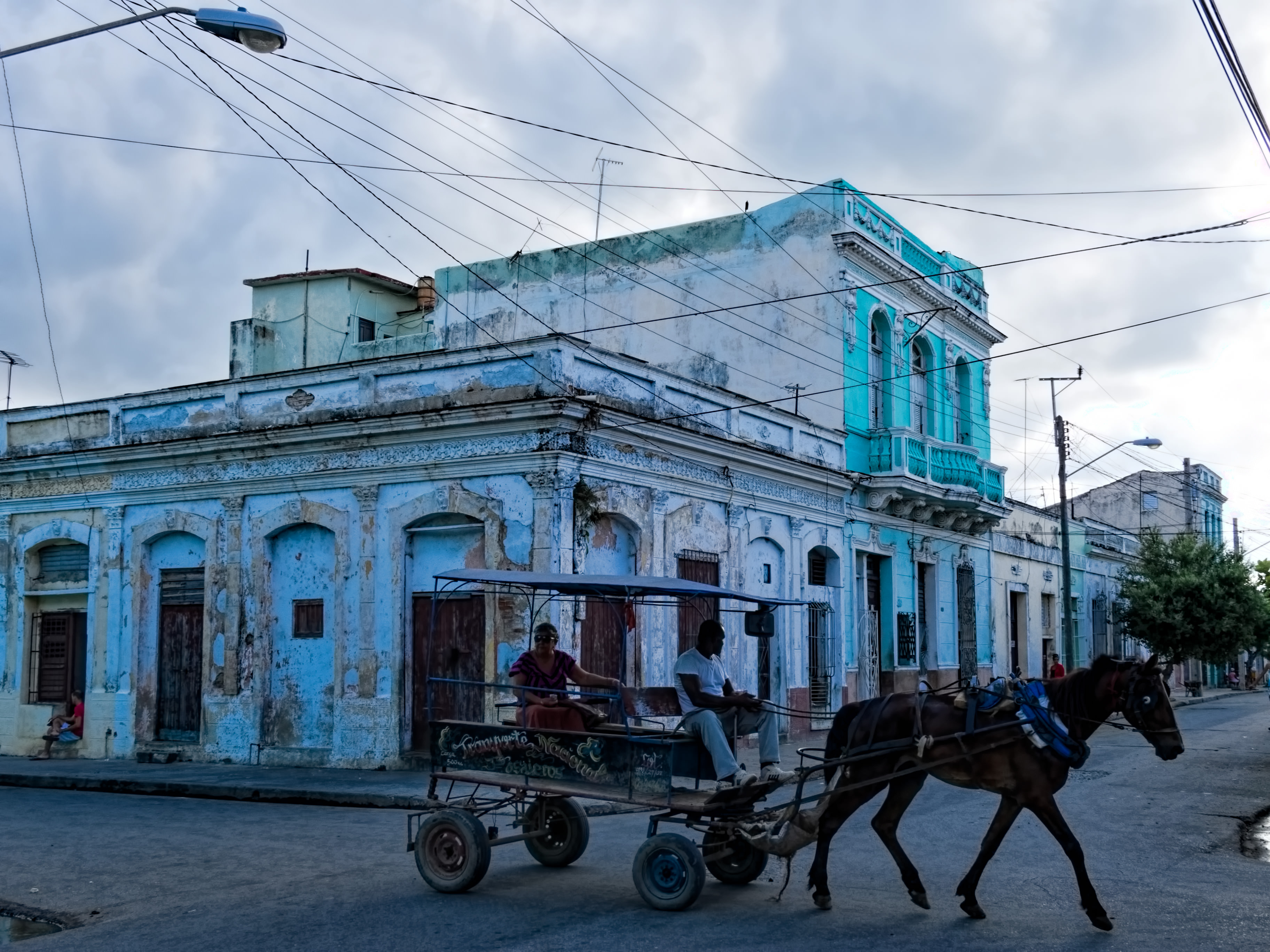
- Typical old street in Cienfuegos

- Flag Coat of arms
- Nickname: La Perla del Sur (Pearl of the South)
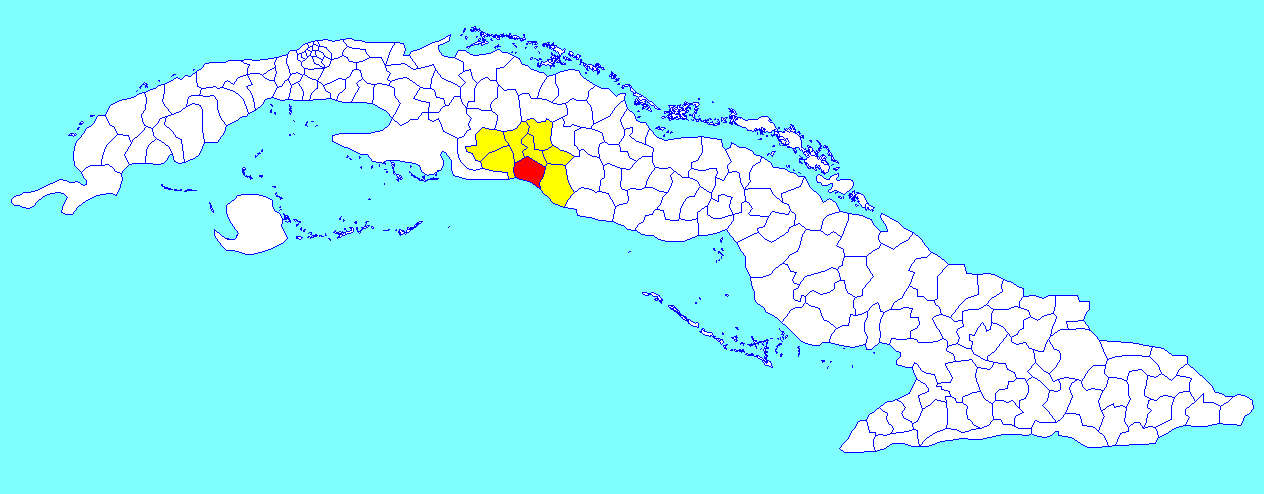
- Cienfuegos municipality (red) within Cienfuegos Province (yellow) and Cuba
- Coordinates: 22°08′44″N 80°26′11″W
- Country: Cuba
- Province: Cienfuegos
- Founded: 1819

Government
  - President: Santiago González Acosta

Area
  - Total: 333 km^{2} (129 sq mi)
- Elevation: 25 m (82 ft)

Population (2022)
  - Total: 178,368
  - Density: 536/km^{2} (1,390/sq mi)
- Demonym: Cienfuegueros
- Time zone: UTC−5 (EST)
- Postal code: 55100–55500
- Area code: +53 43
- Vehicle registration: CF
- Website: cienfueguero.gob.cu

UNESCO World Heritage Site
- Official name: Urban Historic Centre of Cienfuegos
- Type: Cultural
- Criteria: ii, v
- Designated: 2005 (29th session)
- Reference no.: 1202
- Region: Latin America and the Caribbean

Cienfuegos (Latin American Spanish: [sjeɱˈfweɣos]), capital of Cienfuegos Province, is a city on the southern coast of Cuba. It is located about 250 km (160 mi) from Havana and has a population of 178,368 in 2022. Since the late 1960s, Cienfuegos has become one of Cuba's main industrial centers, especially in the energy and sugar sectors. The city is dubbed La Perla del Sur (Pearl of the South). Despite being known as an industrial city of factories and various power plants (including a never completed nuclear plant), and the name Cienfuegos literally translating to "one hundred fires" (cien, "one hundred"; fuegos, "fires"), the city actually takes its name from the surname of Asturian-born José Cienfuegos Jovellanos, Captain General of Cuba (1816–19).

Between the end of the 19th century and the beginning of the 20th century, the city was settled by many Spaniards, mainly Catalans and Asturians who amassed fortunes as businessmen in different branches, some of them in the sugar industry. They became rich during their stay in Cuba, and they commissioned many of the most emblematic buildings of Cienfuegos that remain today (See also: Indiano). Another well known resident was the Irish-born John O’Bourke who had ten children on the island, three of whom were Cuban independence fighters from the Spanish crown: the mestizos Juan O'Bourke y Palacio, Rafael O’Bourke y Borroto, and Don Miguel O’Bourke y Ramos. There were also artistic personalities born in Cuba who have contributed to the cultural history of the city.

In 2005, UNESCO inscribed the Urban Historic Centre of Cienfuegos on the World Heritage List, citing Cienfuegos as the best extant example of early 19th century Spanish Enlightenment influence on urban planning. The downtown area contains six buildings from 1819–50, 327 buildings from 1851 to 1900, and 1188 buildings from the 20th century.

== History ==
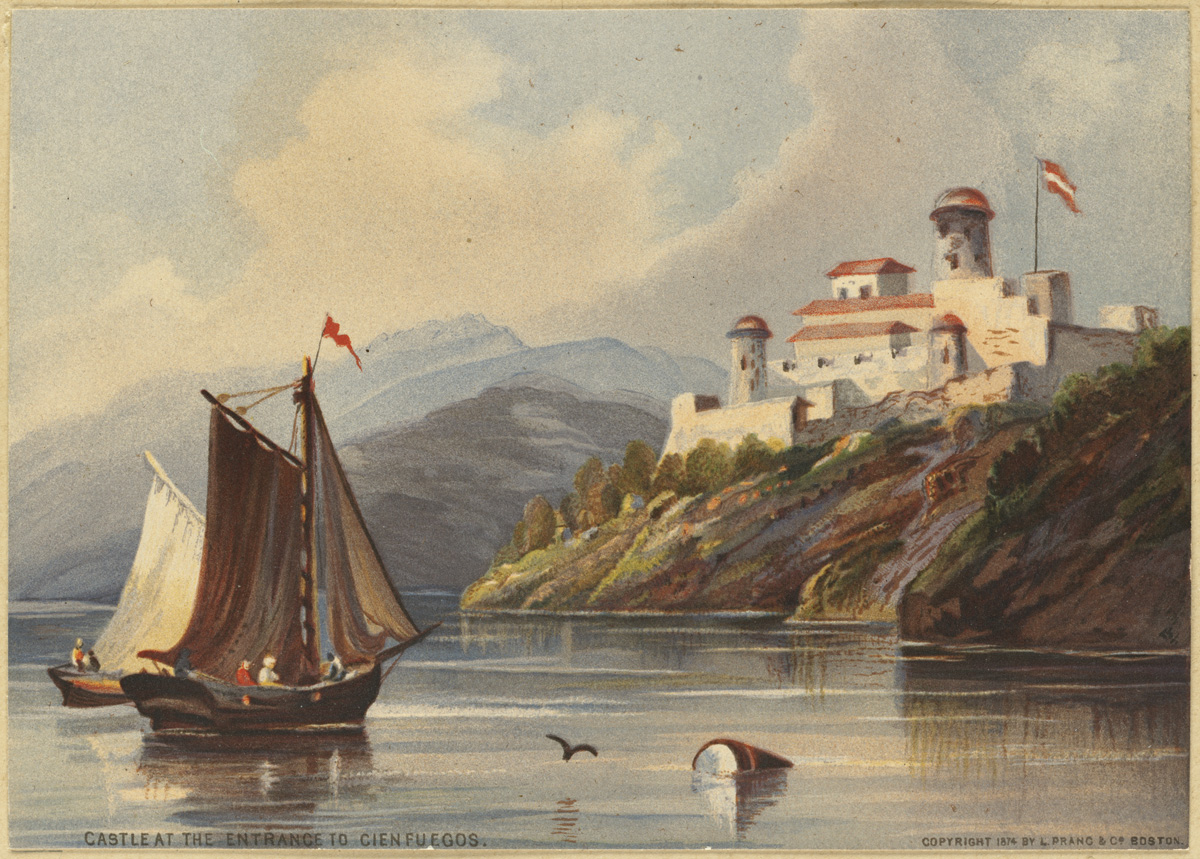
"Castle at the Entrance to Cienfuegos" (Colonial-era Castillo de Jagua), painting of 1855, by Granville Perkins. Boston Public Library.

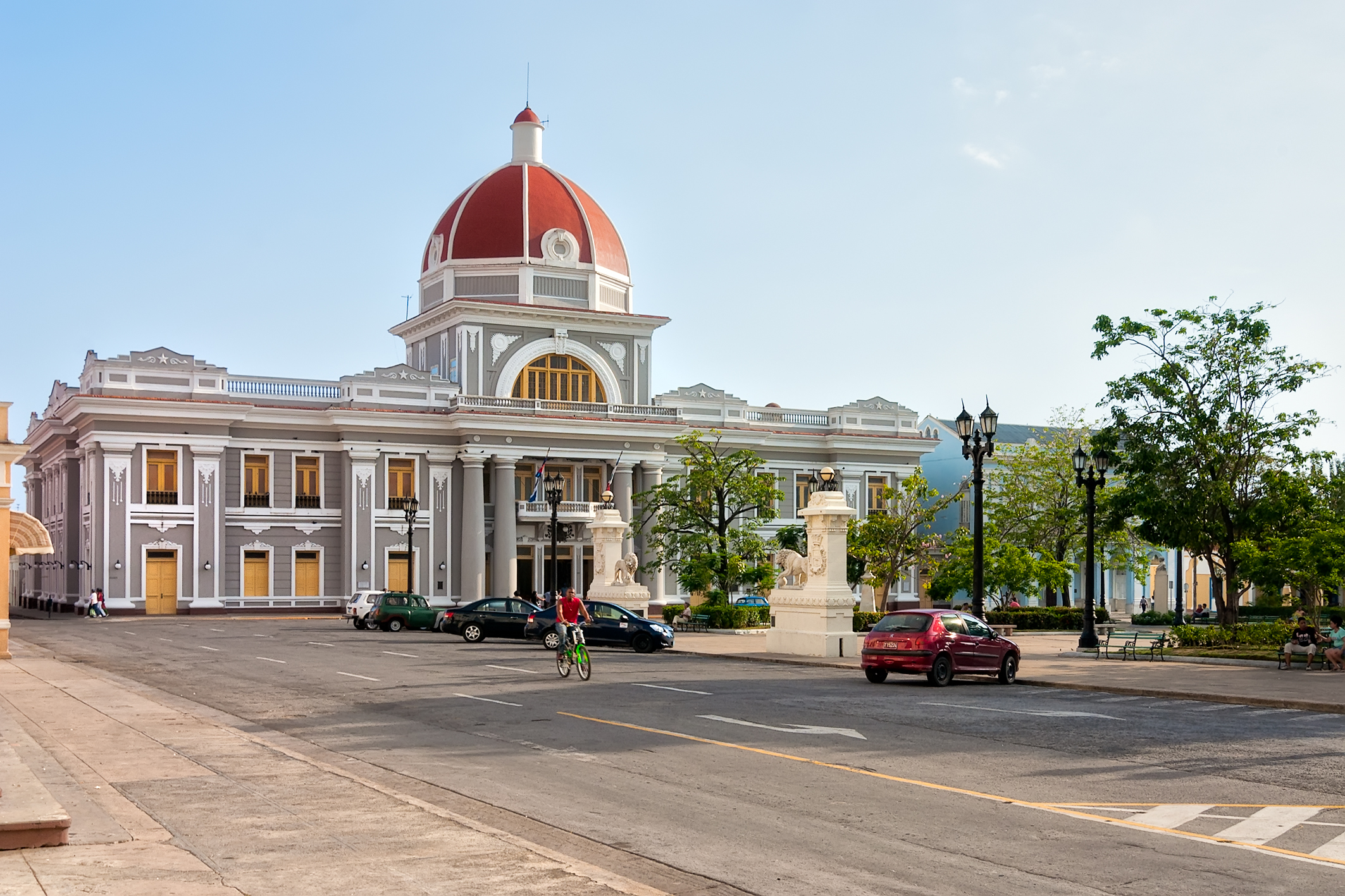
Cienfuegos City Hall

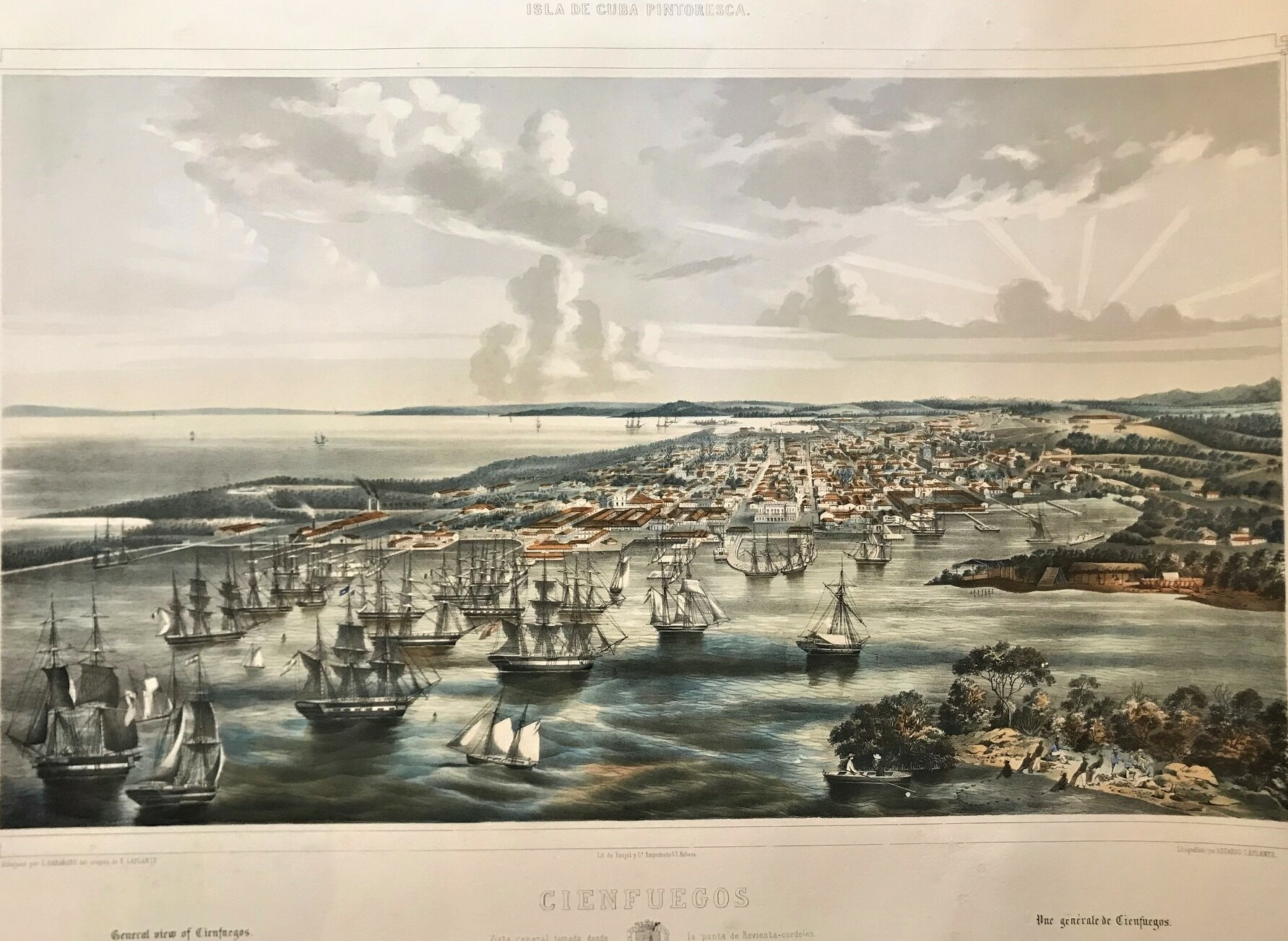
Cienfuegos (Cuba) view from Punta Revienta-Cordeles, in 1856 by French-born Édouard Laplante and Leonardo Barañano. Firestone Library, Princeton University.

The area where the city lies was identified as Cacicazgo de Jagua by early Spanish conquistadors. It was originally settled by Ciboney (Taino) indigenous people. Cacicazgo translates from the Taino language as "chiefdom". Cacicazgo de Jagua was therefore the chiefdom of Chief Jagua.

The city was later settled by French immigrants from Bordeaux and Louisiana led by Don Louis de Clouet on 22 April 1819. The settlers named the city Fernandina de Jagua in honor of King Ferdinand VII of Spain and local Ciboneyan-Chief Jagua. The settlement successively became a town (villa) in 1829, renamed for Asturian-born José Cienfuegos Jovellanos, Captain General of Cuba (1816–19), and a city in 1880. Many of the streets in old town reflect French origins in their names: Bouyón, D'Clouet, Hourruitiner, Gacel, and Griffo, for instance.

Cienfuegos port, despite being one of the latest settlements established during the colonial era, soon grew to be a powerful town due to the fertile fields surrounding it and its position on the trade route between Jamaica and South American cities to the southeast and the hinterland provincial capital of Santa Clara to the northeast. Its advantageous trading location on the historically eponymous Bay of Jagua was used by the Cuban sugar oligarchy when a railroad was built between both cities between 1853 and 1860.

Near Cienfuegos was the scene of a battle during the Spanish–American War on 11 May 1898, between American Marines attempting to sever underwater Spanish communication lines and the Spanish defenders.

Between the end of the 19th century and the beginning of the 20th century, the city was settled by many Spaniards, mainly Catalans and Asturians who amassed fortunes as businessmen in different branches, other few of them obtained in the sugar industry, they became rich during their stay in Cuba, and they commissioned many of the most emblematic buildings of Cienfuegos that remain today (See also: Indiano). Other well known residents were the Irish-born John O’Bourke, he had ten children on the island, three of whom were Cuban independence fighters from the Spanish crown, the mestizos Juan O'Bourke y Palacio, Rafael O’Bourke y Borroto, and Don Miguel O’Bourke y Ramos. There were also artistic personalities born in Cuba who have contributed in the cultural history of the city.

The architects of Cienfuegos buildings from different centuries were Cuban-born, Italians and Spaniards architects.

During the Cuban Revolution, the city saw an uprising against Fulgencio Batista and was bombed in retaliation on 5 September 1957. The city later became a key industrial center, part of the revolutionary government's "anti-urban" planning policy, with industrial projects including the never-completed Juraguá nuclear power plant, the "Camilo Cienfuegos" oil refinery named for Camilo Cienfuegos, and the "Carlos Marx" cement factory.

In 1969 and 1970, a flotilla of Soviet naval vessels visited the city, which included two barges used to store and transport nuclear waste and a submarine tender. Their presence was detected by U-2 reconnaissance aircraft of the United States Air Force that were sent out to monitor the Cuban coastline after a suspicious Soviet request to renegotiate the terms of the Kennedy–Khrushchev agreements of 1962 that were made in the aftermath of the Cuban Missile Crisis, with many American intelligence analysts concluding that the Soviet Navy was planning to construct a submarine base in Cienfuegos. This was interpreted by some to be in violation of the 1962 agreements between Kennedy and Khrushchev. However, because of a détente between the Soviet Union and the United States since 1962, no major military or diplomatic confrontation ensued, and the Soviets agreed to withdraw their ships after American National Security Advisor Henry Kissinger informed Soviet ambassador to the United States Anatoly Dobrynin that the United States government believed the presence of these naval vessels to be a violation of the agreements made eight years before.

In 2005, Hurricane Dennis made its second landfall near Cienfuegos at about 1:00PM AST (17:00 UTC) with winds of 232 km/h (144 mph) and gusts reaching 285 km/h (177 mph).

== Geography ==
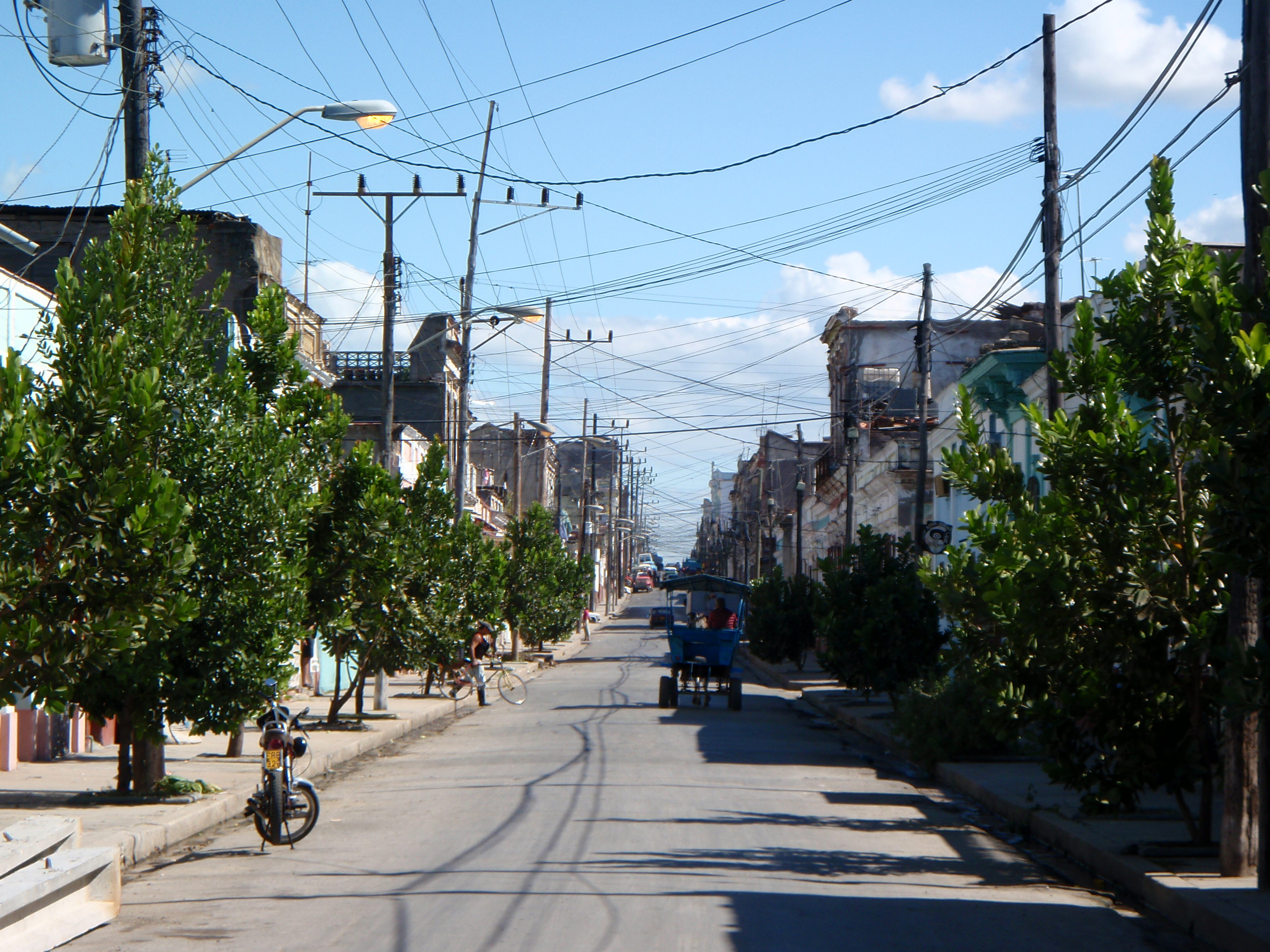
Tree-lined residential street in Cienfuegos in 2009

Near the entrance to Cienfuegos Bay is Castillo de Jagua (full name: Castillo de Nuestra Señora de los Angeles de Jagua), a fortress erected in 1745 for protection against Caribbean pirates.

Cienfuegos, one of the chief seaports of Cuba, is a center of the sugar trade as well as coffee and tobacco. While sugarcane is the chief crop, local farmers also grow coffee.

=== Climate ===
According to the Köppen Climate Classification system, Cienfuegos has a tropical savanna climate, abbreviated "Aw" on climate maps.

Climate data for Cienfuegos
Month	Jan	Feb	Mar	Apr	May	Jun	Jul	Aug	Sep	Oct	Nov	Dec	Year
Record high °C (°F)	31.1 (88.0)	32.8 (91.0)	33.3 (91.9)	32.8 (91.0)	34.4 (93.9)	35.0 (95.0)	35.0 (95.0)	34.4 (93.9)	35.0 (95.0)	33.9 (93.0)	32.8 (91.0)	31.7 (89.1)	35.0 (95.0)
Mean daily maximum °C (°F)	27.2 (81.0)	27.8 (82.0)	28.9 (84.0)	29.4 (84.9)	30.6 (87.1)	31.7 (89.1)	32.2 (90.0)	32.2 (90.0)	31.7 (89.1)	31.1 (88.0)	28.3 (82.9)	27.8 (82.0)	29.9 (85.8)
Daily mean °C (°F)	22.2 (72.0)	22.3 (72.1)	23.4 (74.1)	24.4 (75.9)	25.6 (78.1)	26.7 (80.1)	27.2 (81.0)	27.2 (81.0)	26.7 (80.1)	26.7 (80.1)	23.9 (75.0)	22.8 (73.0)	24.9 (76.8)
Mean daily minimum °C (°F)	17.2 (63.0)	16.7 (62.1)	17.8 (64.0)	19.4 (66.9)	20.6 (69.1)	21.7 (71.1)	22.2 (72.0)	22.2 (72.0)	21.7 (71.1)	21.7 (71.1)	19.4 (66.9)	17.8 (64.0)	19.9 (67.8)
Record low °C (°F)	7.8 (46.0)	7.2 (45.0)	7.2 (45.0)	10.0 (50.0)	13.3 (55.9)	18.9 (66.0)	20.0 (68.0)	19.4 (66.9)	20.0 (68.0)	15.6 (60.1)	11.1 (52.0)	8.9 (48.0)	7.2 (45.0)
Average rainfall mm (inches)	18 (0.7)	25 (1.0)	33 (1.3)	46 (1.8)	119 (4.7)	152 (6.0)	122 (4.8)	160 (6.3)	173 (6.8)	160 (6.3)	41 (1.6)	23 (0.9)	1,072 (42.2)
Source: Sistema de Clasificación Bioclimática Mundial

== Demographics ==
In 2004, the municipality of Cienfuegos had a population of 163,824. With a total area of 333 km^{2} (129 sq mi), it has a population density of 492.0/km^{2} (1,274/sq mi).

== Sports ==
Cienfuegos fields a team in the Cuban National Series, the Cienfuegos Elefantes. Since joining the league in 1977–78, the best finish the Camaroneros have achieved is a 3rd place showing in the 2010–11 Cuban National Series. Despite finishing with the best record at 59–31, the Elefantes lost the semifinals in six games to the eventual champions, the Pinar del Río Vegueros.

== Attractions ==
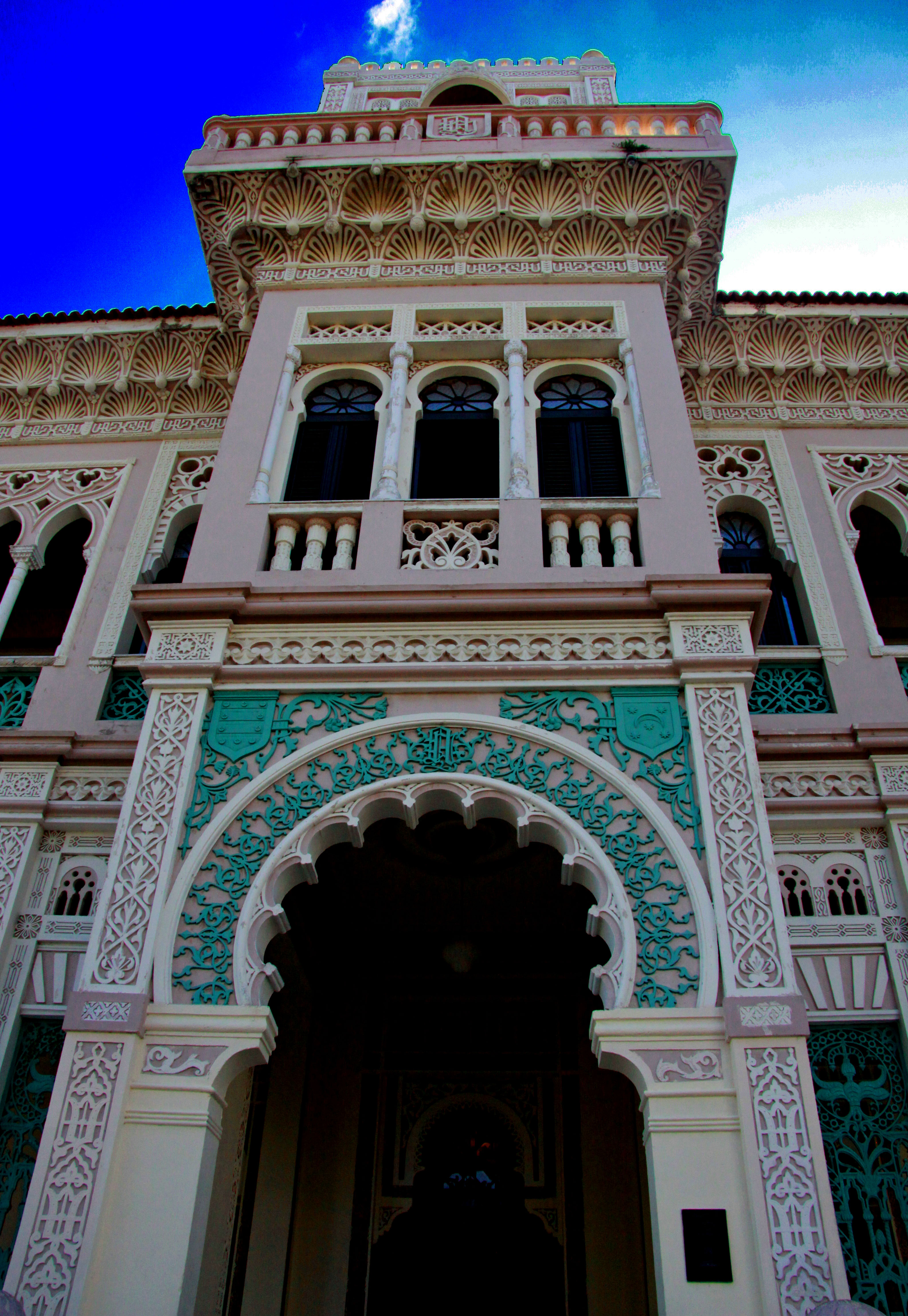
Tower entrance of the Palacio del Valle.

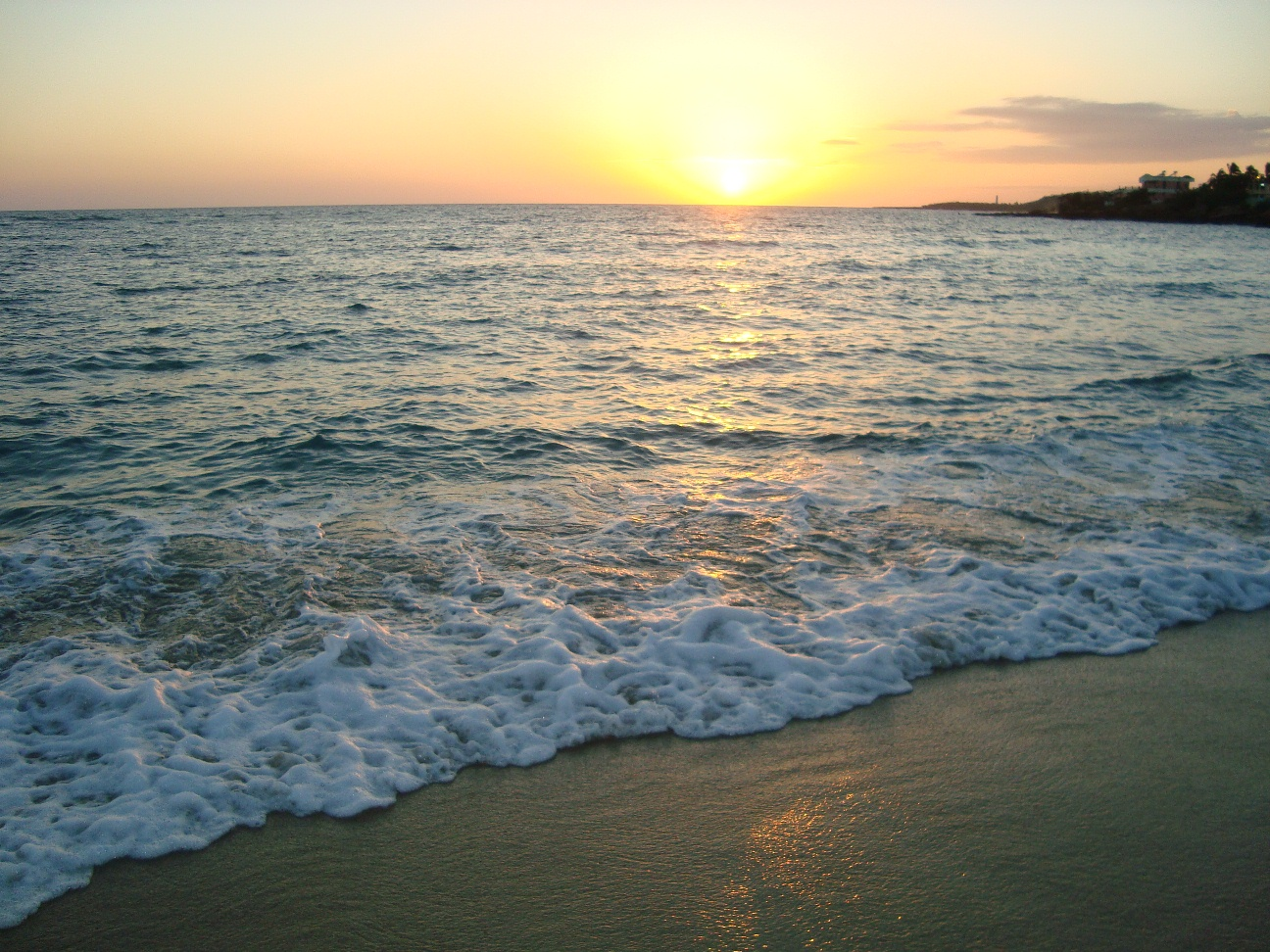
Sunset at Rancho Luna Beach

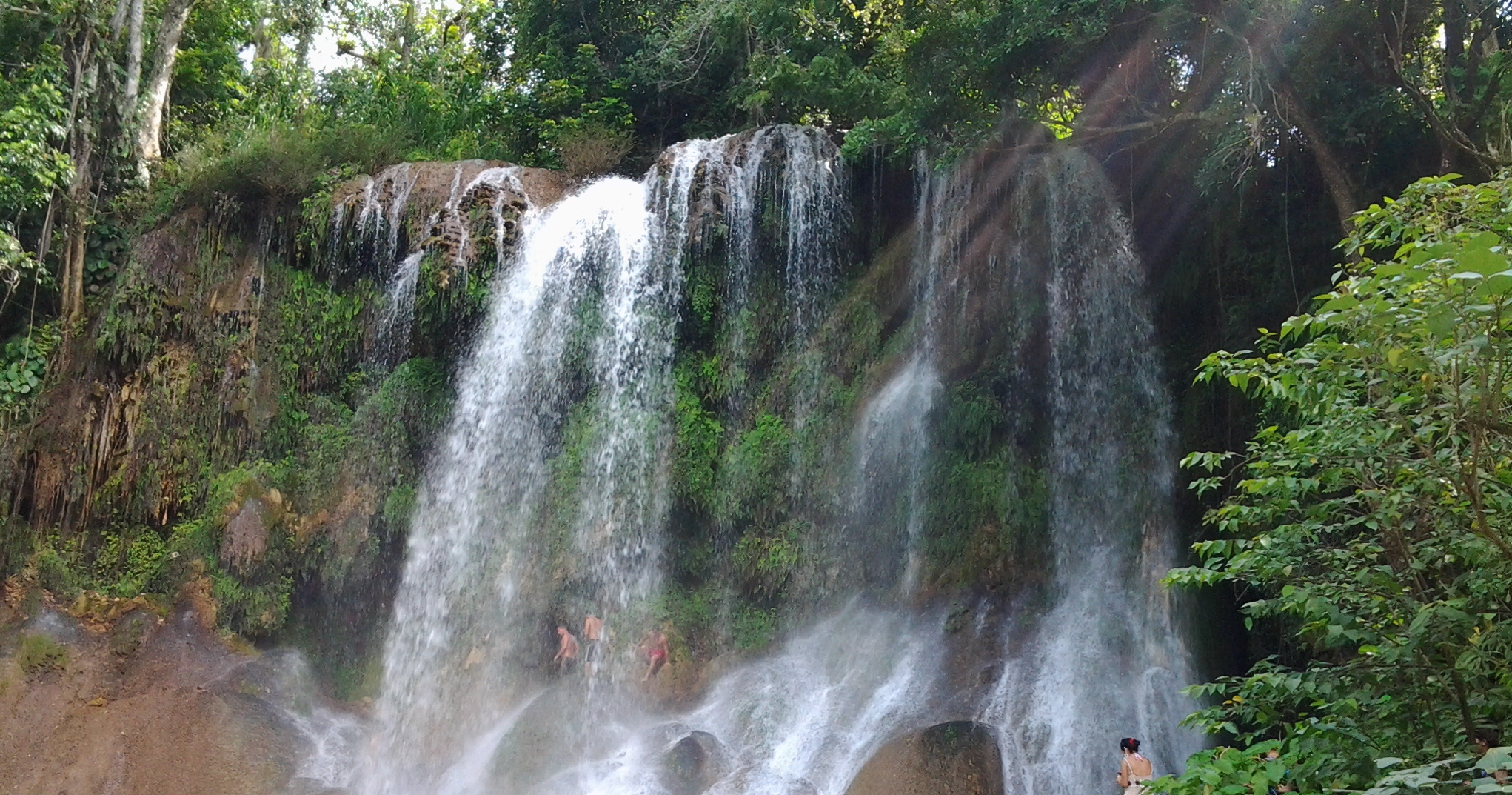
El Nicho, Cienfuegos

- Castillo de Nuestra Señora de los Ángeles de Jagua – fortress
- City Hall of Cienfuegos
- Arco de Triunfo – the only Triumphal arch in Cuba
- Catedral de Nuestra Señora de la Purísima Concepción – cathedral with stained glass work, built 1833–1869
- Delfinario – dolphins and sea lions in a saltwater lagoon
- Jardín Botánico de Cienfuegos – 97 hectares of botanic garden
- Museo Provincial – furniture and porcelain museum
- Palacio del Valle – built 1913–1917 in Moorish revival style
- Palmira Yorubá Pantheon – museum of religious afro-catholic syncretism
- Parque José Martí – park in Plaza de Armas
- Teatro Tomás Terry – colonial style theater
- Palacio Ferrer
- Malecón de Cienfuegos
- Paseo del Prado – longest street in Cuba, full of colorful buildings
- Quintero (cigar) cigar factory
- University of Cienfuegos "Carlos Rafael Rodríguez" (UCF) – the province's high education institution
- Rancho Luna Beach
- El Nicho
- Laguna del Cura - an authentic fishing boat lagoon.

== Transportation ==
The city is served by Jaime González Airport, which, as of 2024, has only one scheduled flight to Toronto.

== Notable people ==
- Melissa Vargas, volleyball player, member of Cuban, later Turkish women's national team; born here
- José Abreu, MLB player for the Chicago White Sox
- María Conchita Alonso, Cuban-Venezuelan-American singer; born here
- Yordany Álvarez, MLS player for Real Salt Lake
- Joe Azcue, MLB player for the Cincinnati Reds, Kansas City Royals, Cleveland Indians, Boston Red Sox, California Angels, and Milwaukee Brewers
- Luis Posada Carriles, Cuban anti-Castro activist believed to be responsible for the Cubana Flight 455 bombing; born here
- Yoán Moncada, MLB player for the Chicago White Sox
- Benny Moré, Cuban singer
- Antonio Prohías, Cuban-born cartoonist and creator of Spy vs. Spy
- Olance Nogueras Rofes, Cuban journalist
- Gina Pellón, Cuban painter; lived in exile in Paris
- Yasiel Puig, MLB player for the Cleveland Indians; born here
- Robeisy Ramirez, professional boxer and two-time Olympic Gold medalist
- Osmel Sousa, Cuban-Venezuelan entrepreneur and former president of the Miss Venezuela Organization
- José Tartabull, MLB player for the Boston Red Sox
- Cristóbal Torriente, Cuban-born Hall of Fame baseball player
- Corito Varona, baseball player, manager, and scout for Cienfuegos, Havana Sugar Kings, Tigres de Aguascalientes, Plataneros de Tabasco, and the MLB's Cincinnati Reds and Los Angeles Dodgers.

== Sister cities ==
Cienfuegos has the following sister cities:

- Tacoma, Washington, United States
- Etzatlán, Mexico
- Cambridge, Massachusetts, United States
- Kingston, Ontario, Canada (2005)
- Bahía Blanca, Argentina
- Saint-Nazaire, France
- Contagem, Brazil

== Gallery ==
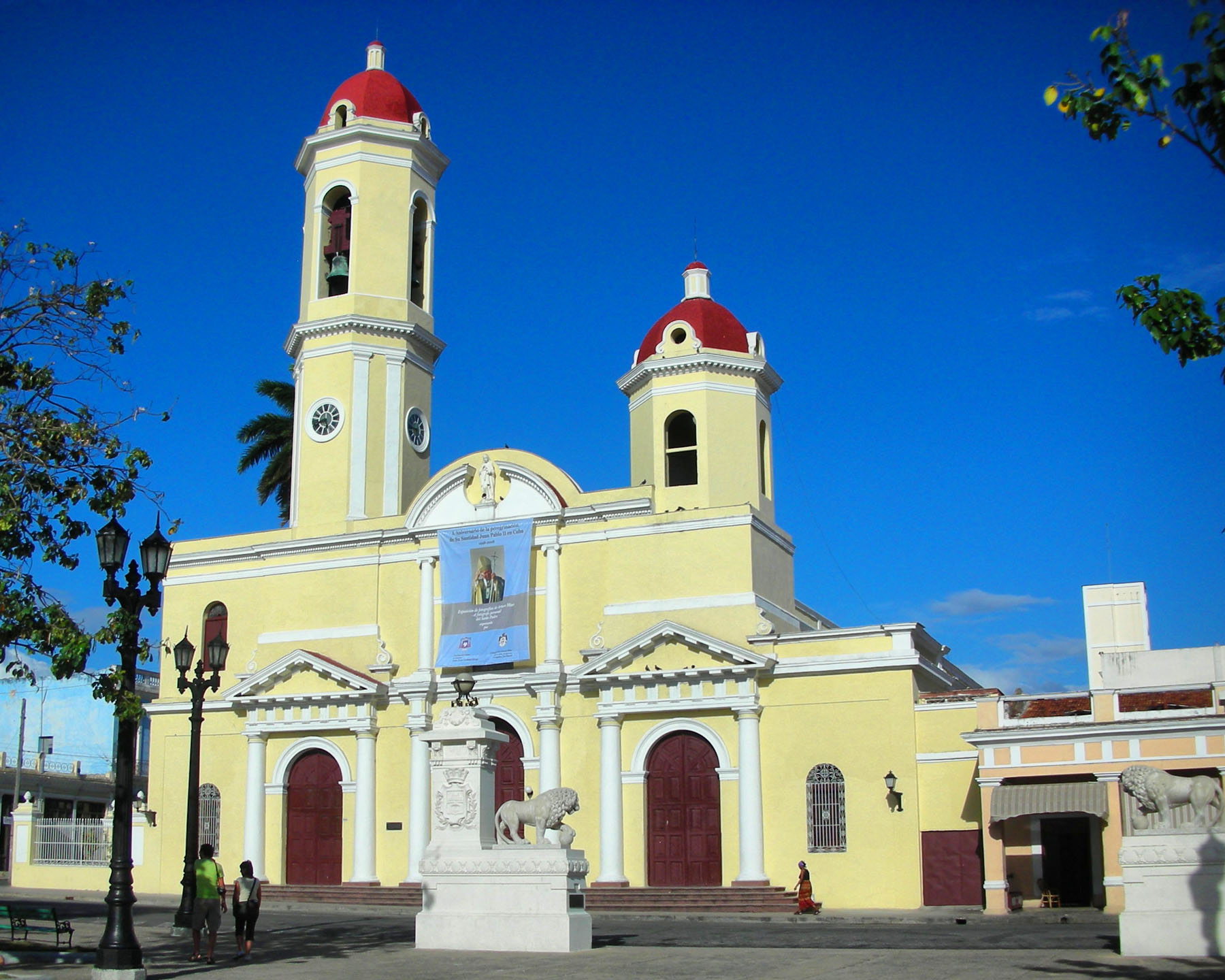
Cienfuegos Cathedral and Medici Lions

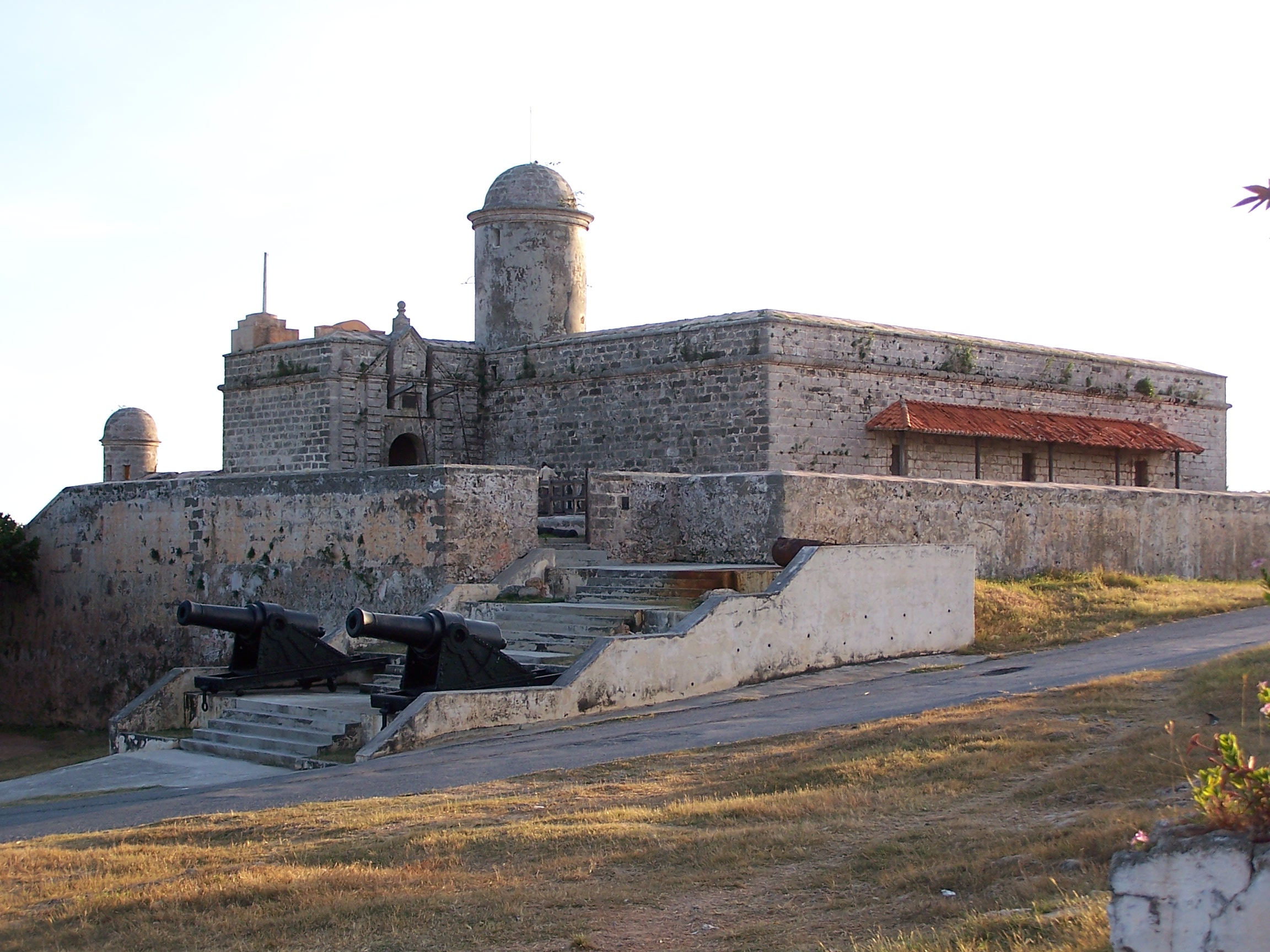
Castle of Jagua

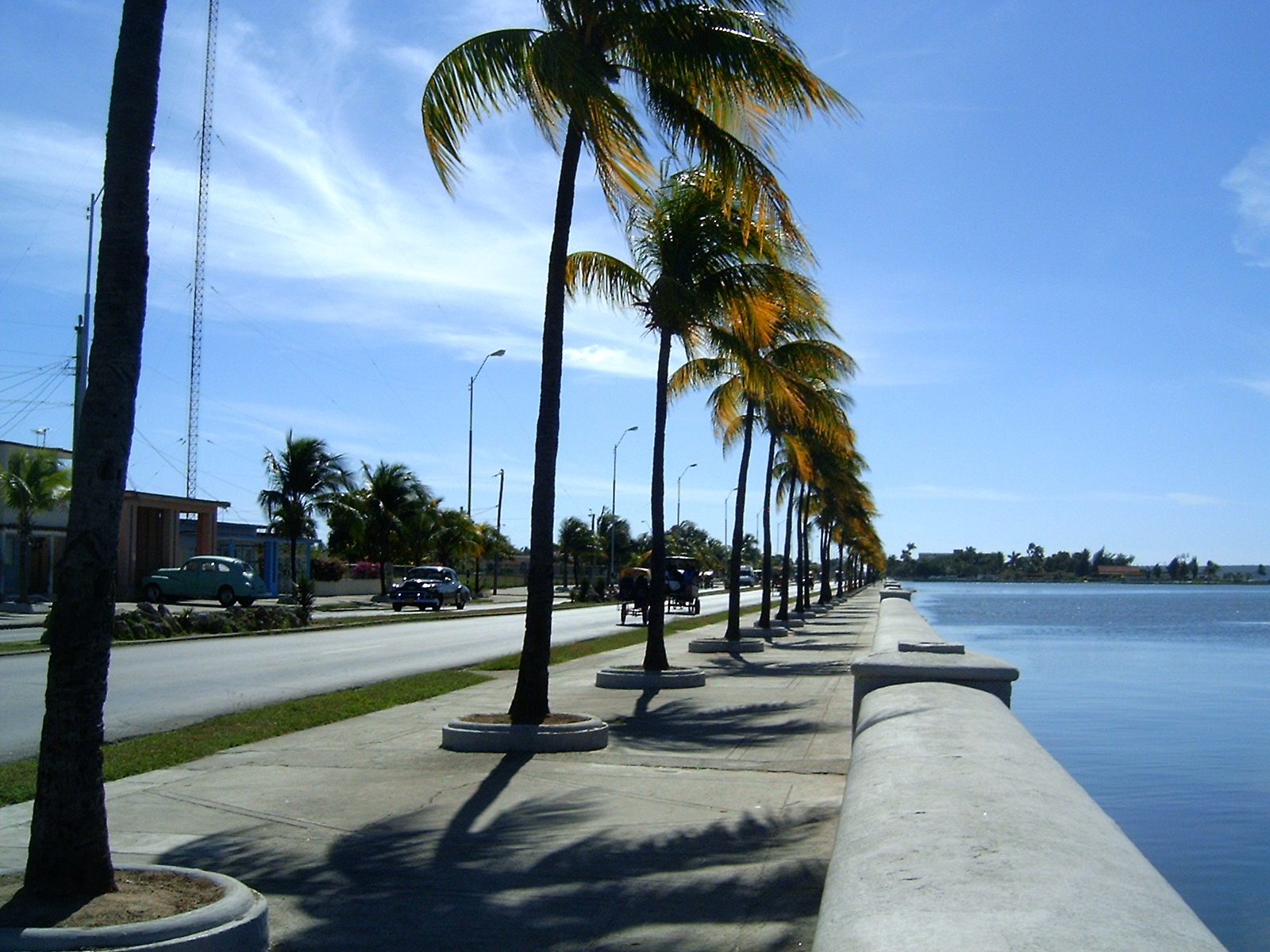
The Promenade of Cienfuegos

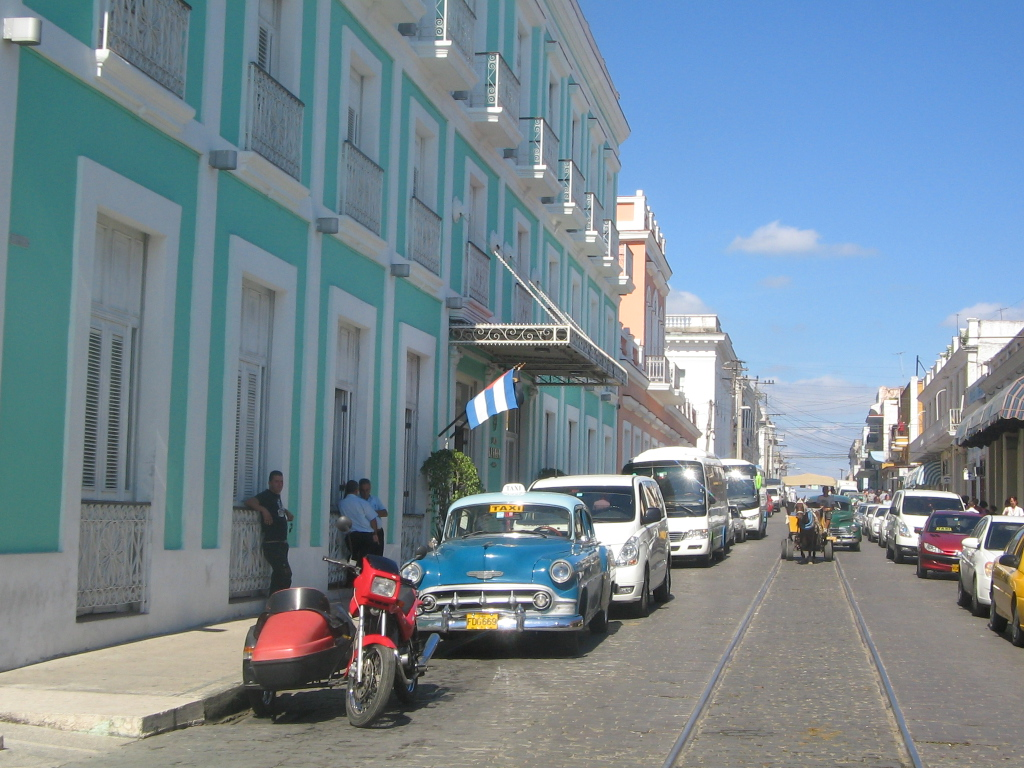
The central Calle D'Clouet with the "Hotel La Unión" (left) and the railtrack remains of the former urban tramway

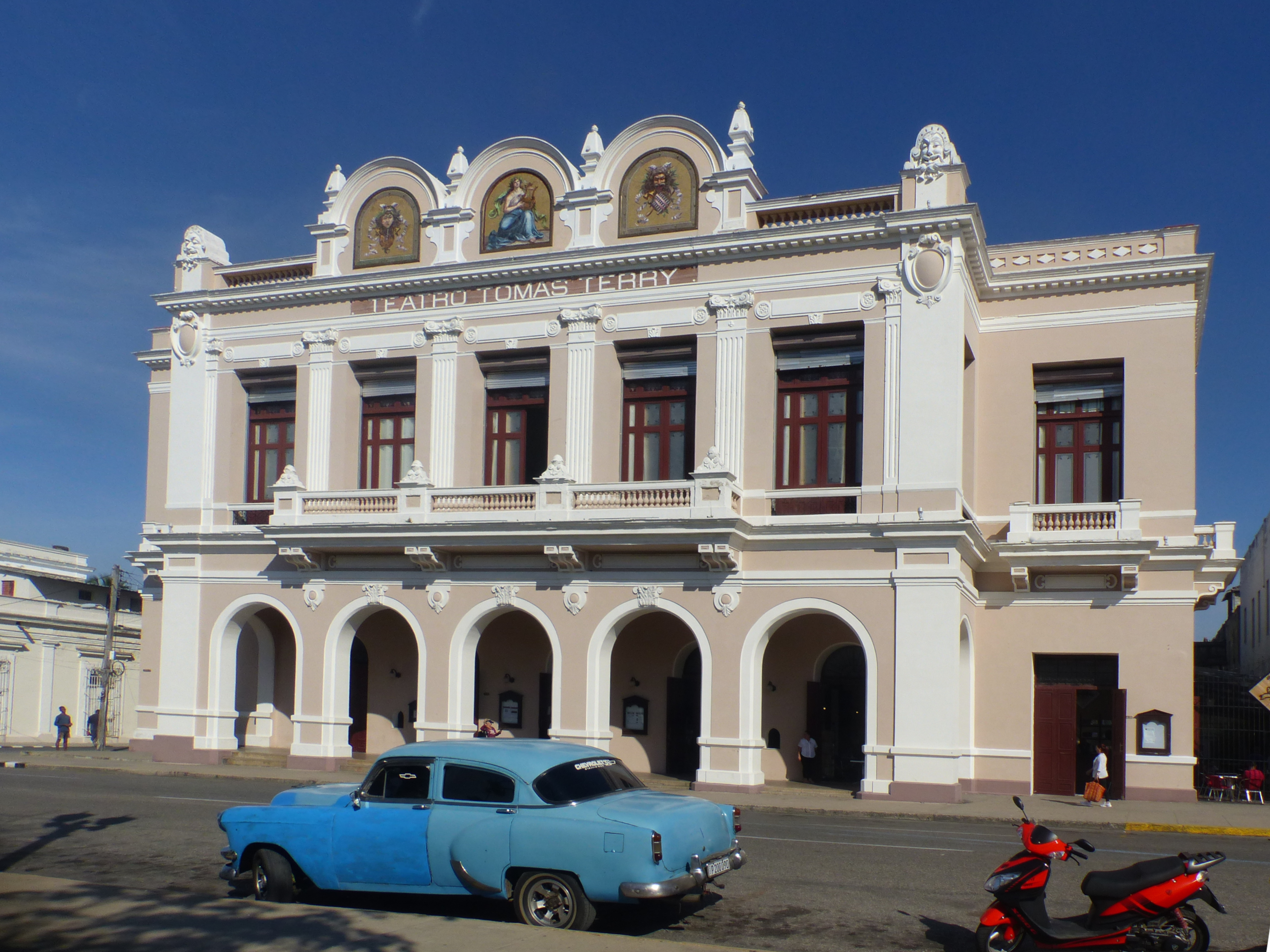
Teatro Tomás Terry in Cienfuegos

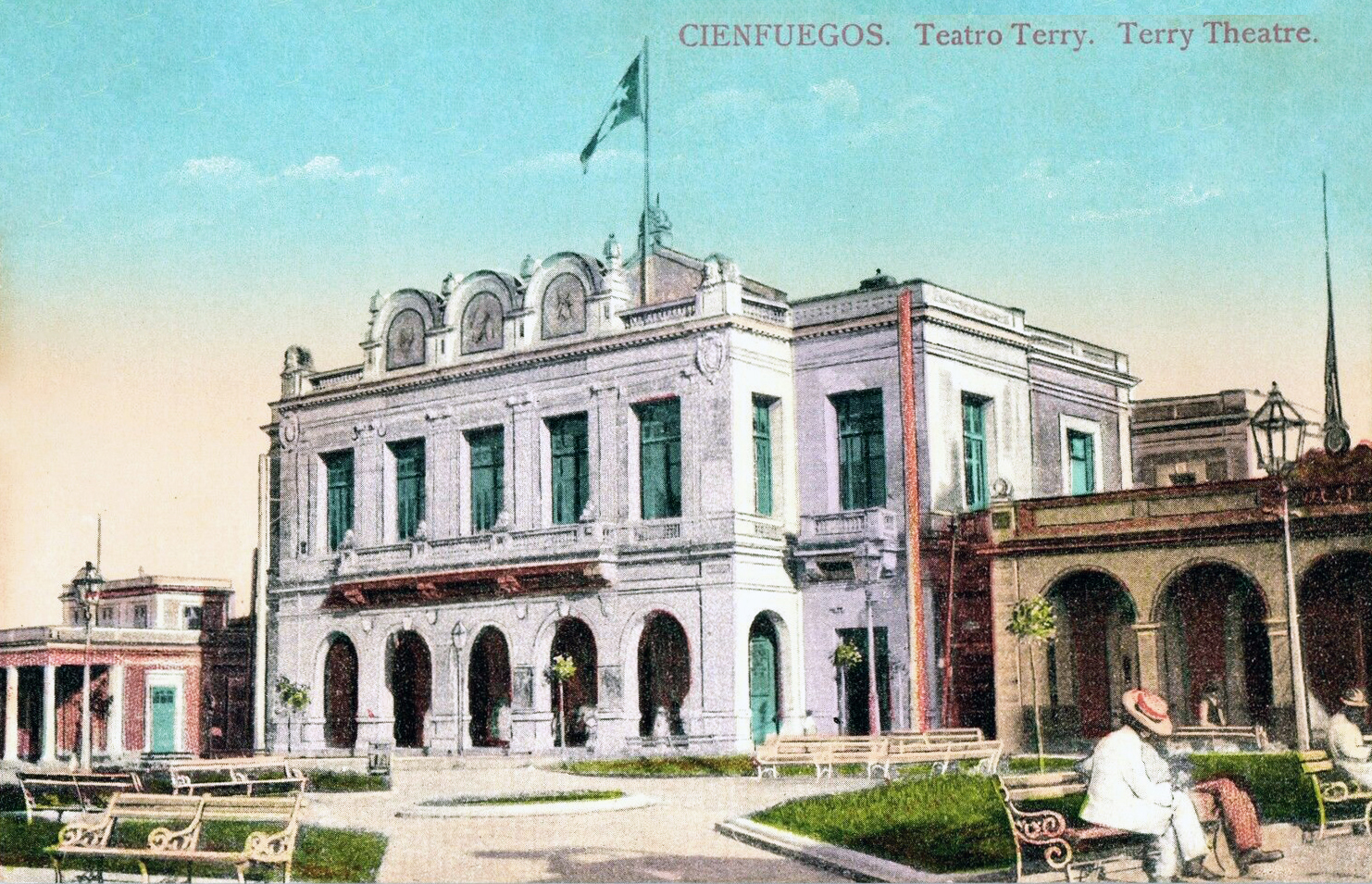
Teatro Tomás Terry, postcard of 1915.

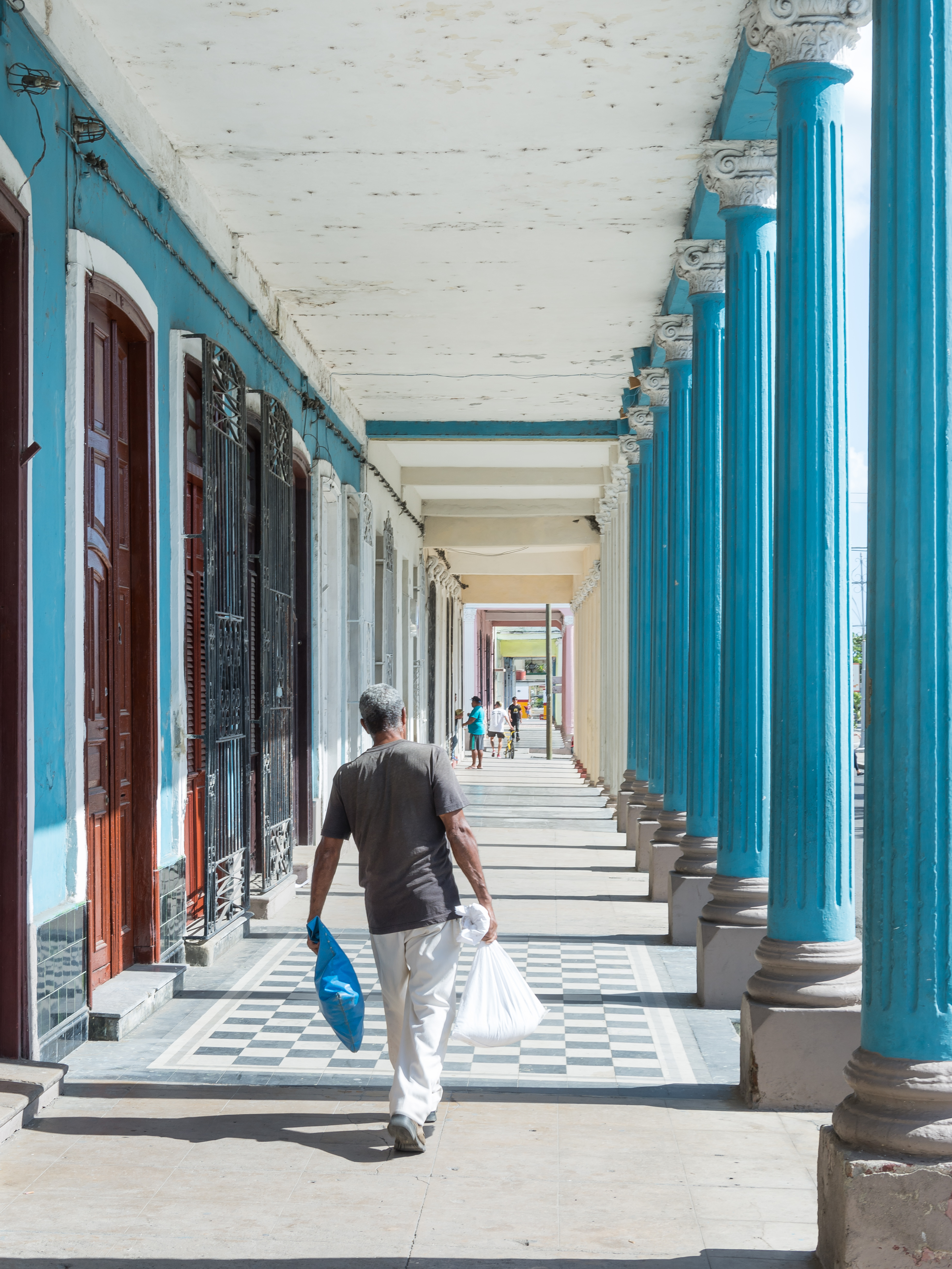

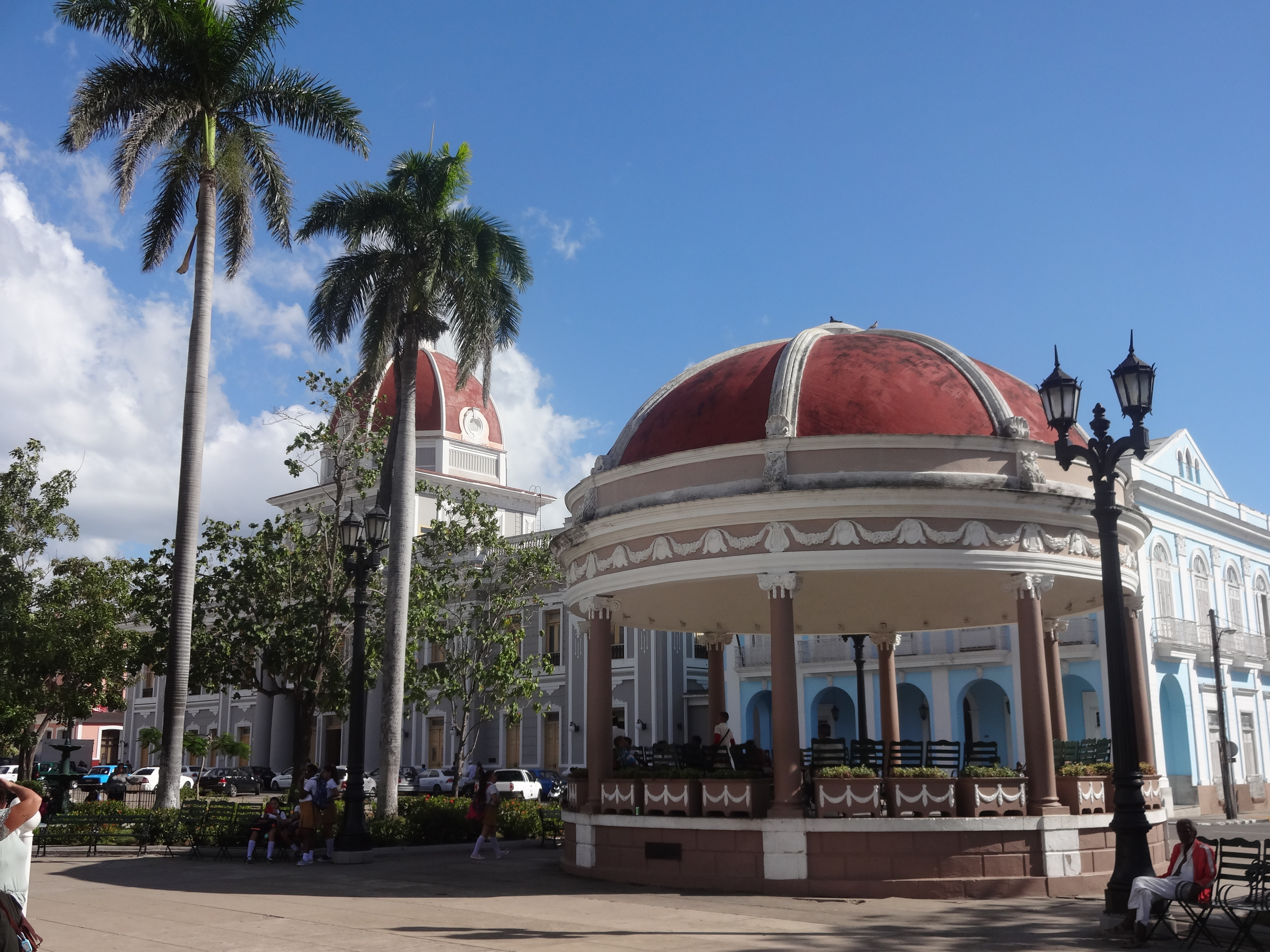
Kiosko

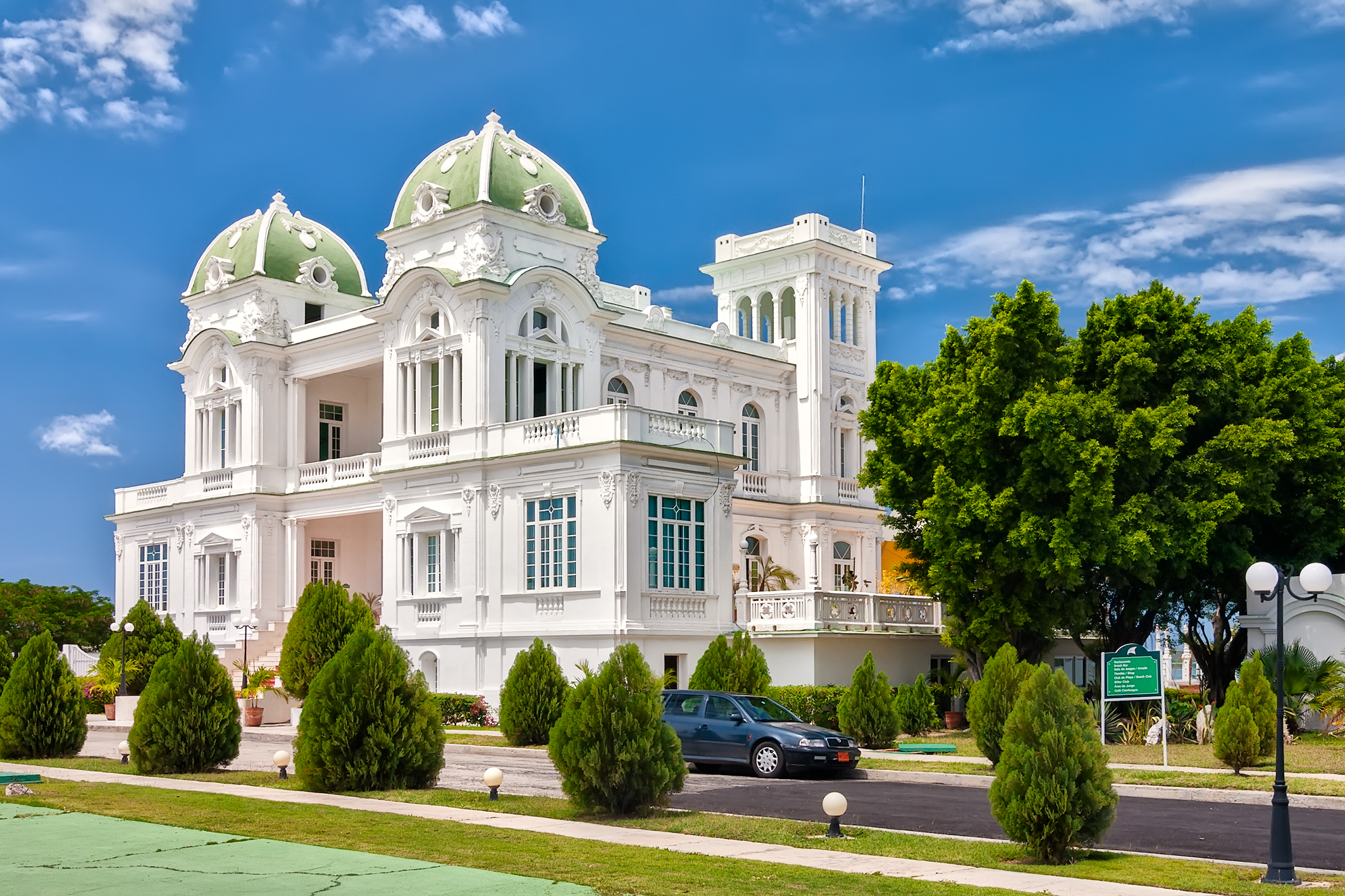
Old Yacht Club building, inaugurated in 1920.

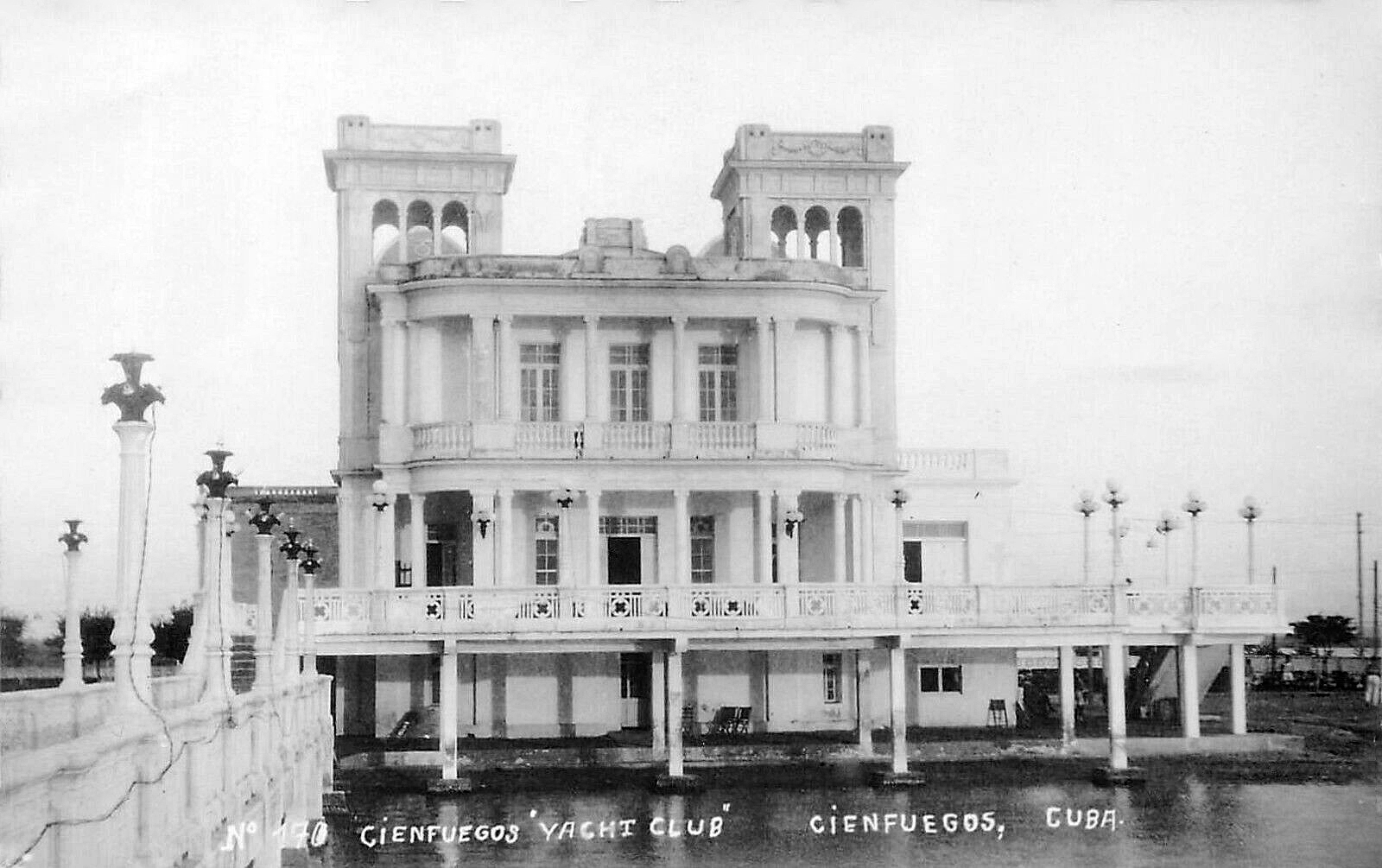
Rear facade of the Old Yacht Club building, photo of 1925.

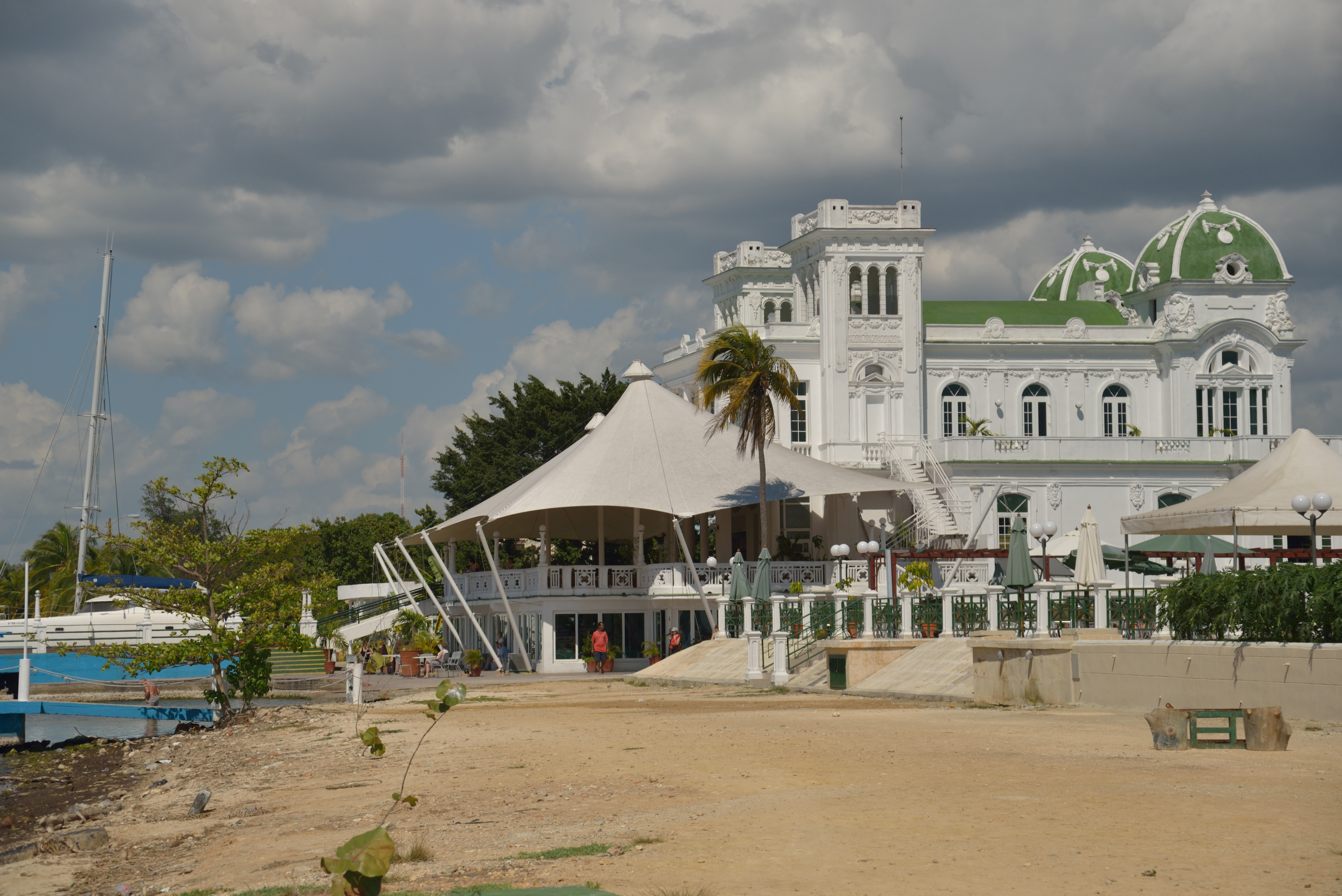

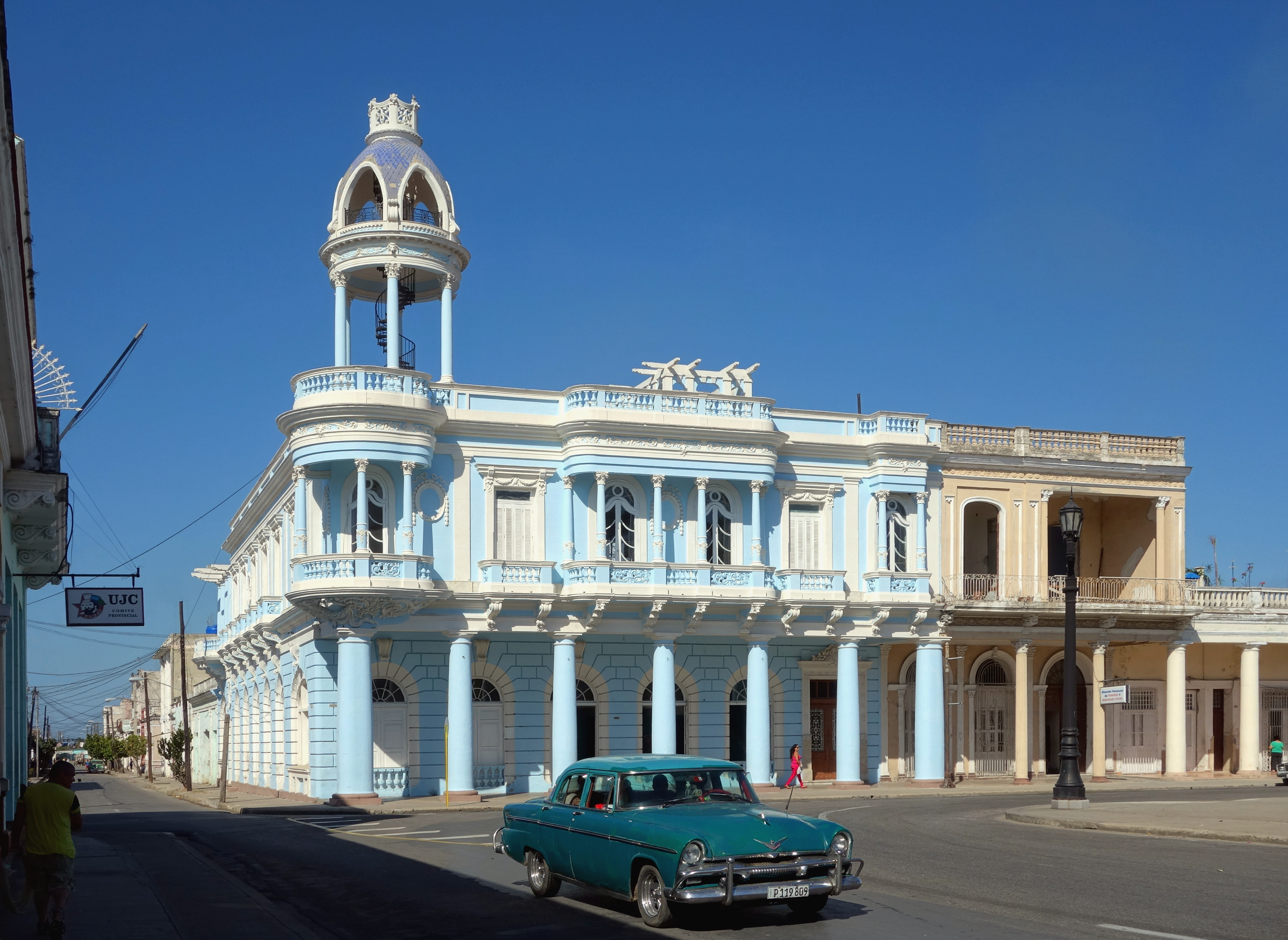
Palacio Ferrer. José Ferrer Sires, a wealthy Catalan settled in Cienfuegos, he commissioned renowned Cuban architect Pablo Donato Carbonell to design the luxurious palace for his family. Construction lasted between 1917 and 1920.

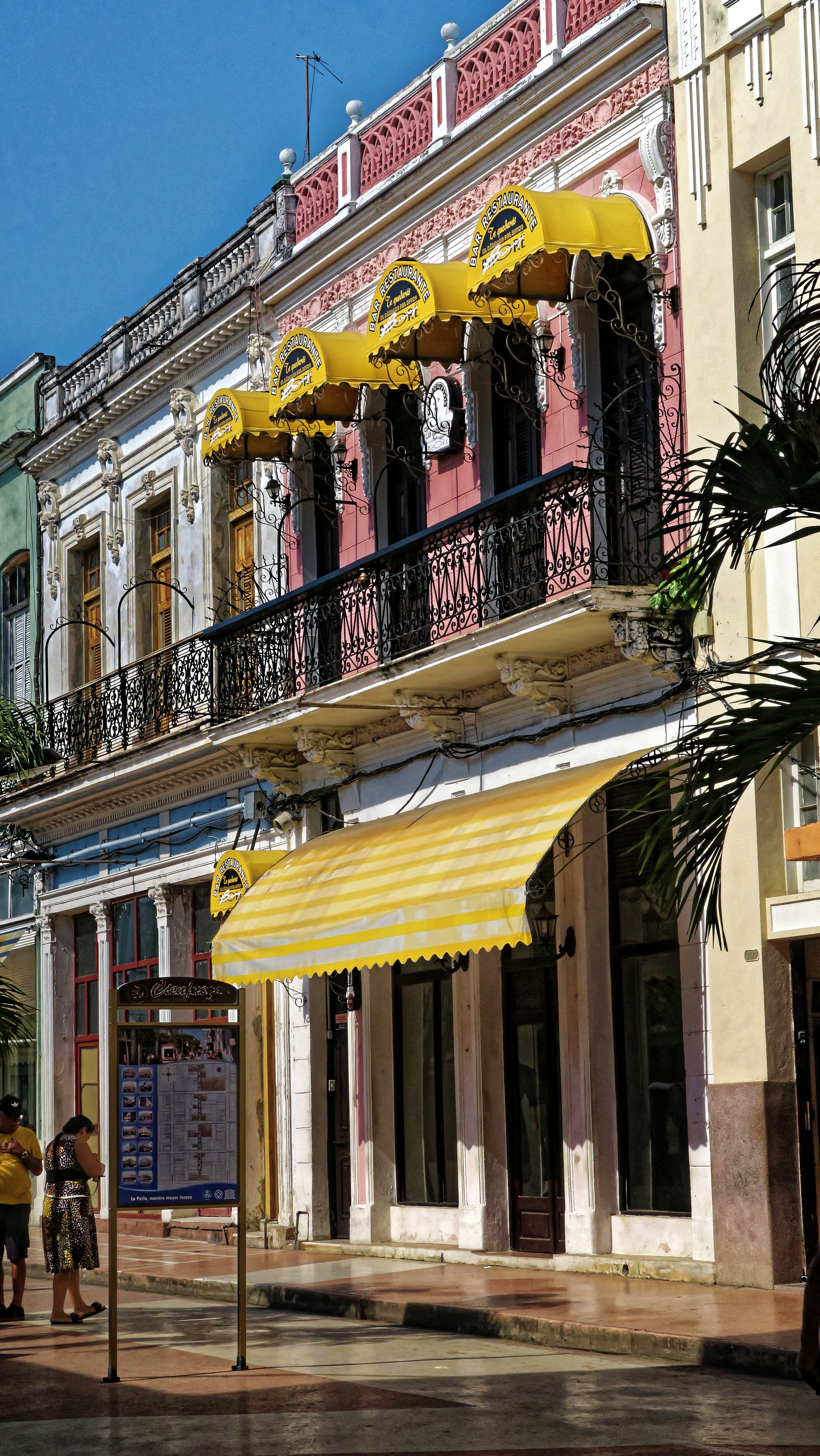

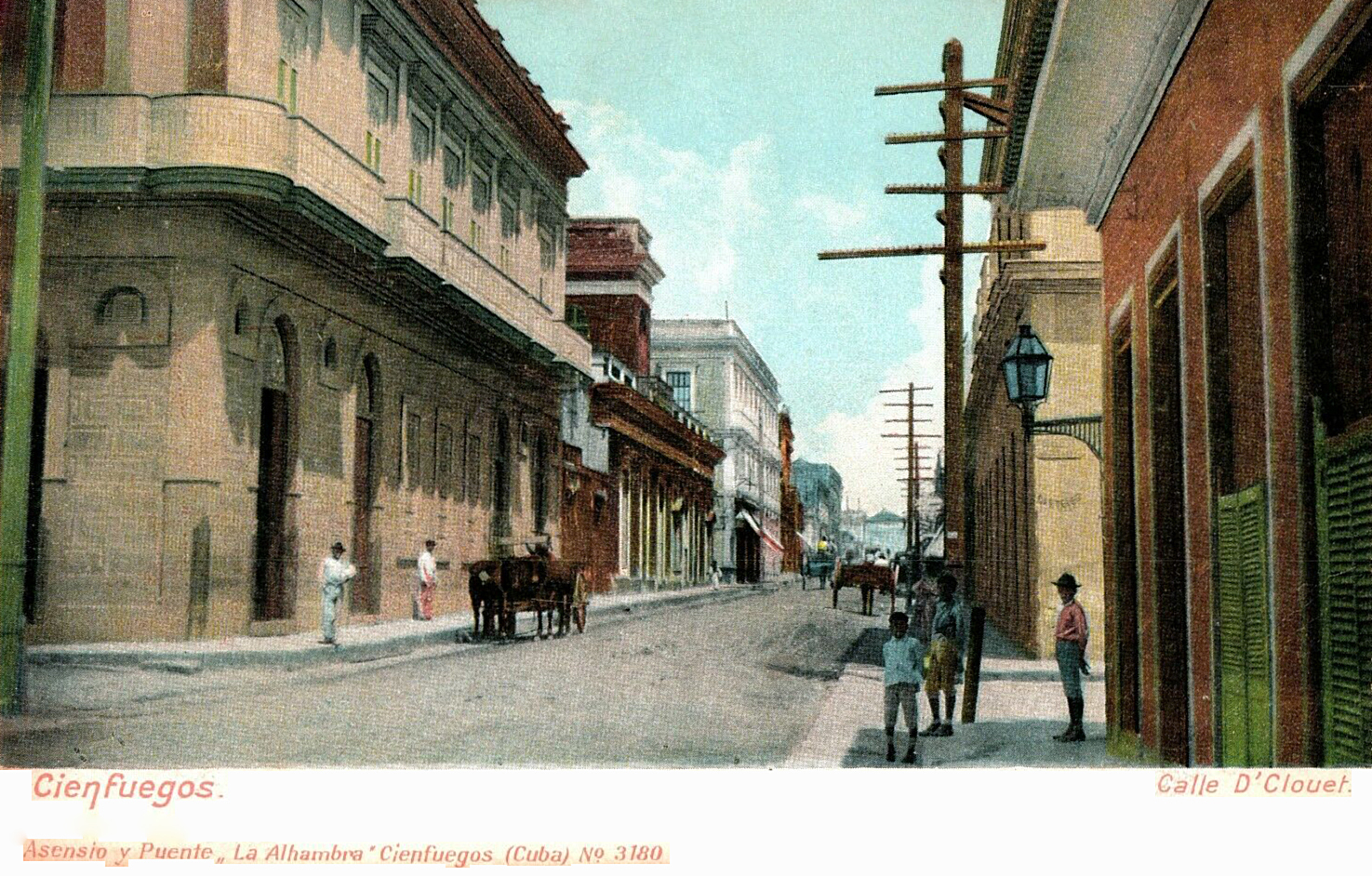
Postcard showing the Calle D'Clouet, Cienfuegos, in 1905.

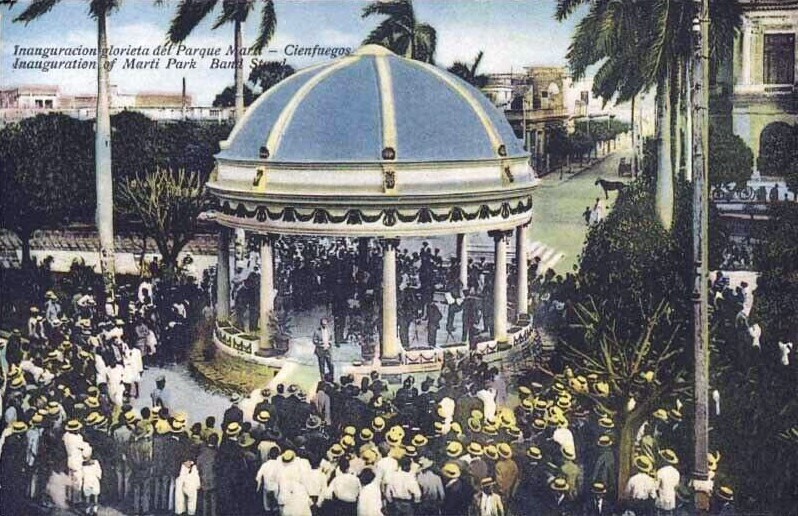
The Kiosko Glorieta, Cienfuegos, in 1921.

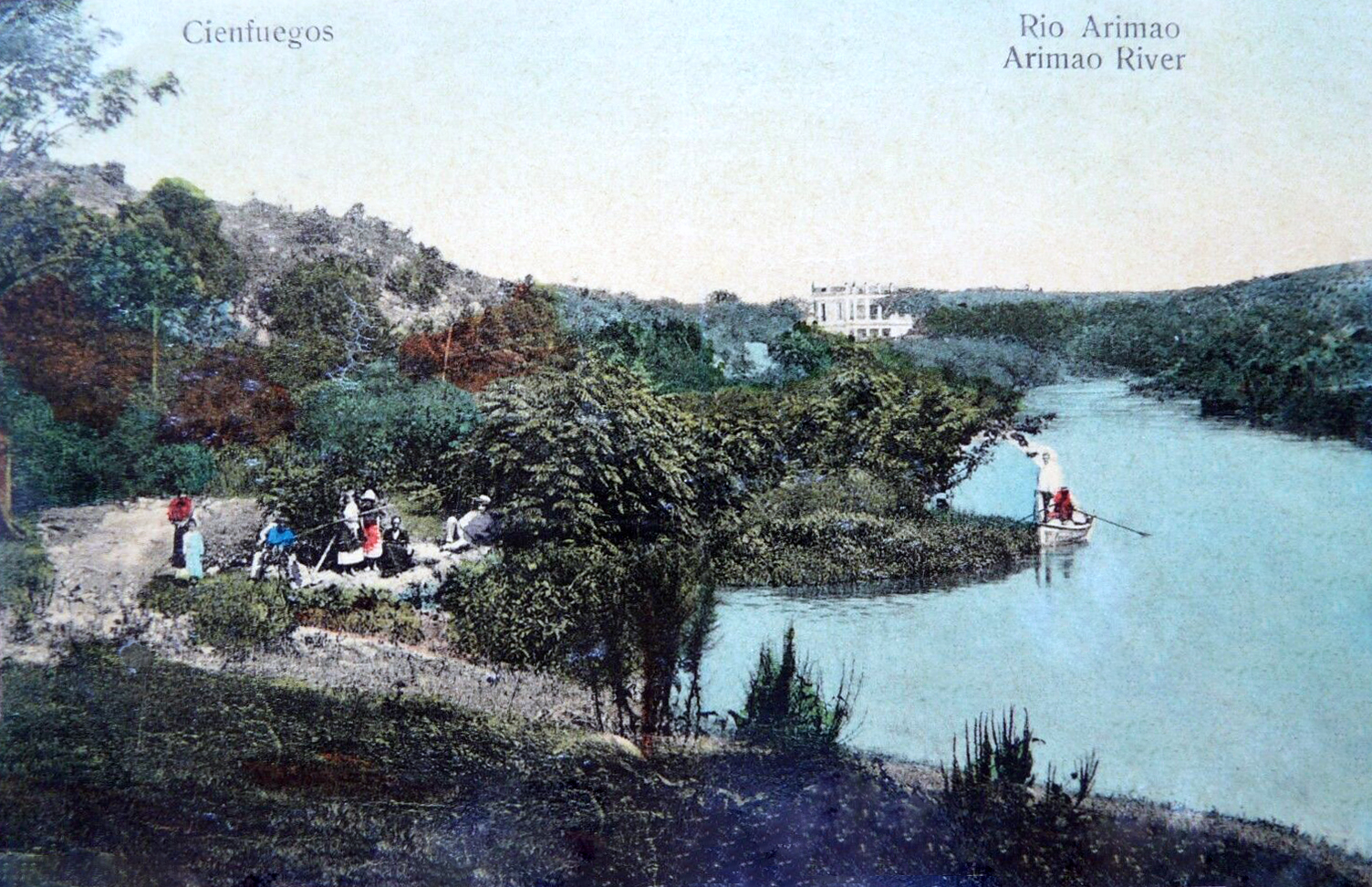
Arimao River, Cienfuegos, postcard of 1915.

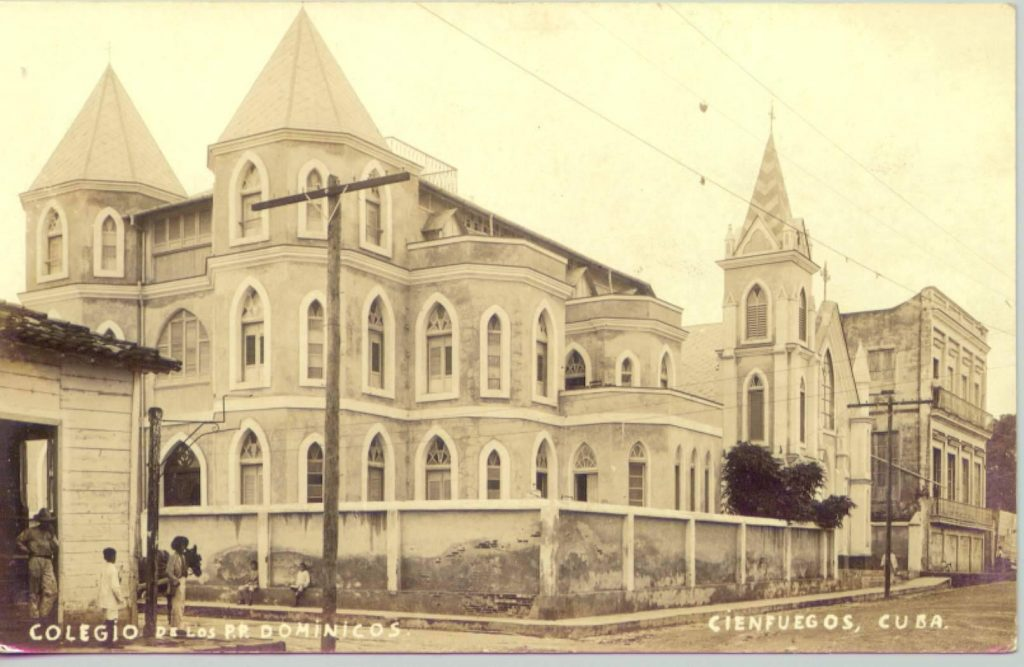
College Church of Los Dominicos, was inaugurated in 1906, postcard of 1921.

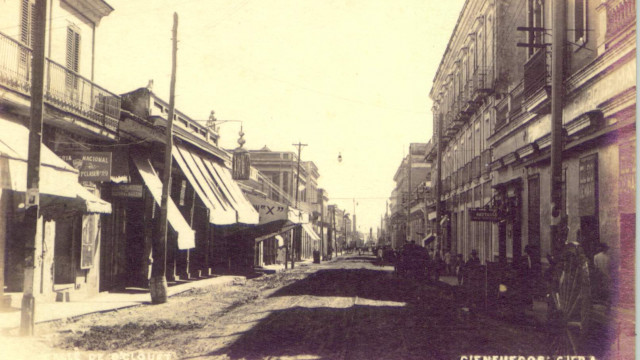
Cienfuegos, 1909

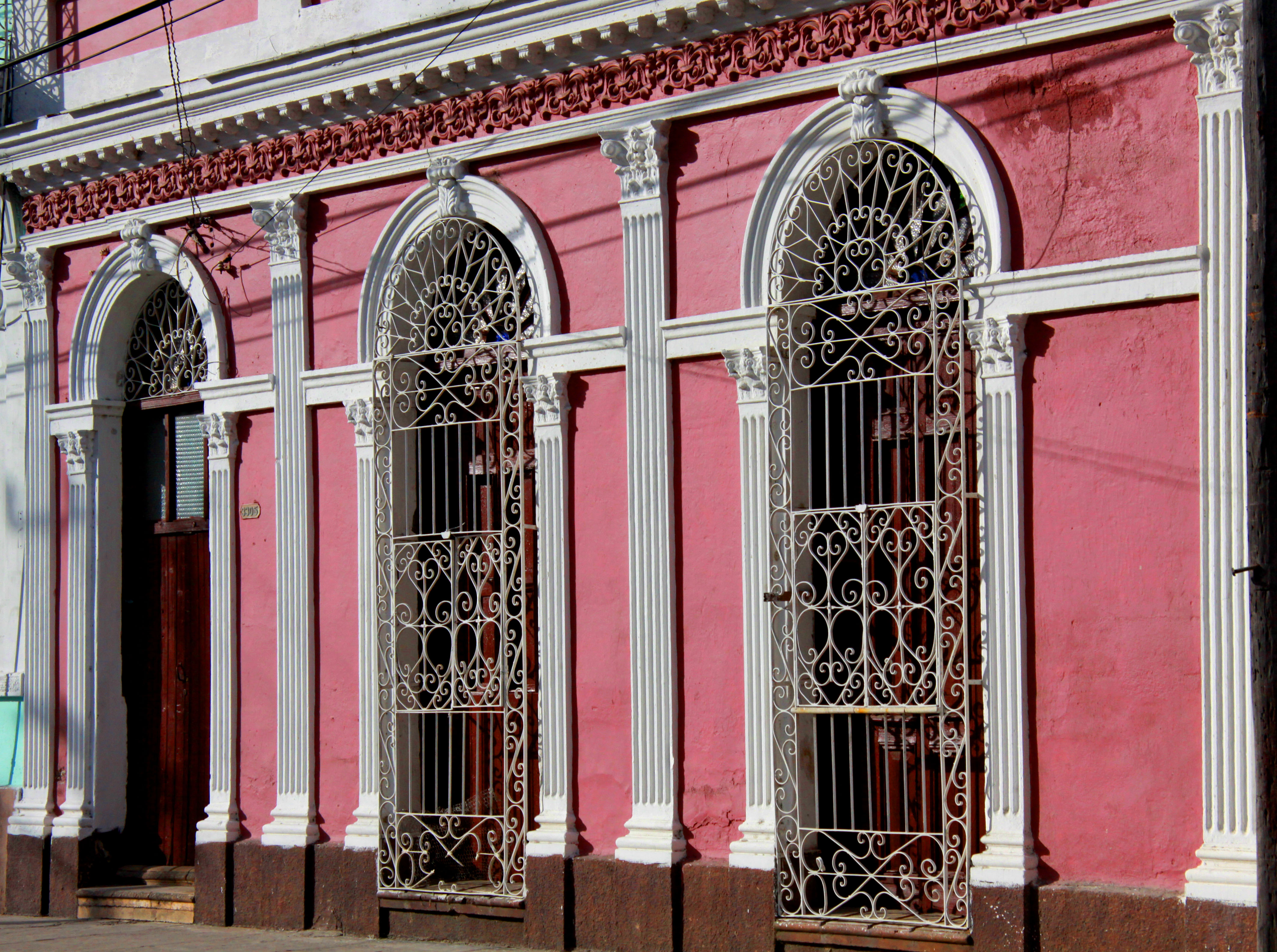

== See also ==
- Historic Centre of Cienfuegos
- List of cities in Cuba
