= Noguera =

Noguera may refer to:

- Noguera (comarca) is one of the Comarques of Catalonia (Spain)
- Noguera (surname), a surname
- Noguera Pallaresa and Noguera Ribagorçana are rivers tributary to the river Segre, in Catalonia, Spain.
- Noguera de Albarracín, a town in Aragon, Spain.
