= Pere Noguera =

Catalan artist (born 1941)

Pere Noguera (born 1941, La Bisbal) is a Catalan artist. He began his career under the new poor poetic, ephemeral and conceptual 1970s. His artistic practice is based on the process, deconstruction and fragmentation, closer to Arte Povera. He has developed work on the processes of conceptual photography and electrography being a pioneer work with copies to the 1970s. He also delved into the concept of "file as a ready-made" from found photographs and films that exhibit an understanding of photography and its process. This work has been reviewed in recent times under the new digital procedures. He has been awarded the ACCA Award in 2011, has made numerous national and international exhibitions centers.
