= Olance Nogueras Rofes =

Olance Nogueras Rofes (born Cienfuegos, Cuba, April 26, 1967) is a journalist.

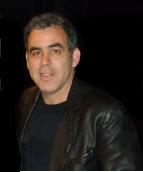
Olance Nogueras

In 1992, Nogueras made a specialization course in journalism in the School of Communication at the University of Havana. Later, at the International Institute of Journalism Jose Marti completed postgraduate courses in television, writing and style, story in print, broadcasting, and opinion.

In January 1994, began his media career as a director and host of the news program “Hora 25” in CMHU, Radio Ciudad del Mar in his native city, Cienfuegos. Three months later, on March 12, 1994, he was expelled indefinitely from the Cuba's official media as the result of an on-air interview with the Secretary General of the Conference of Catholic Bishops of Cuba: Monsignor Emilio Aranguren and also for include political leaders, artists and scholars of Cuban's exiles in Miami in his program.

In August 1994, stars his career as a freelance journalist in the Association of Independent Journalists of Cuba. In September 1995, he was one of the founders of the Independent Press Bureau of Cuba with Raul Rivero, Yndamiro Restano, and other journalists excluded from Cuba government's media.

Nogueras was arrested 26 times by the organs of State Security for his defense of freedom, expression, information, and a democratic opening in the island. He was also expelled several times from press conferences organized by the Cuban's authorities. His recording equipment were seized and violently destroyed. He received death threats, and he was the victim of a rally of repudiation of pro-government mobs, after the U.S. official to accompany Robin Diane Meyer, during a visit to Cienfuegos. Meyer's automobile tires were punctured. The incident caused a protest from the Clinton administration. In 1996, he receives the Freedom of the Press award from the Inter American Press Association (IAPA), as the result of the promotion for freedom of information, as a founding member of the Independent Press Bureau of Cuba.

On August 5, 1997 he went into exile after receiving official notification to a legal process on charges of espionage and false news against international peace, for the dissemination of investigative reports on technical errors in the construction of the Juragua Nuclear Power Plant in Cienfuegos.

On his arrival in the United States, he was engaged by the Sun-Sentinel magazine. Also he was invited to the United States Congress to speak on the Cuban nuclear program, and the dangers of the atomic power plant construction in Juragua, suspended since 1992 for lack of funding.

In January 1998 he became a news reporter for the newspaper El Nuevo Herald, and leads presentations about press freedom and independent journalism. He was invited for the International Committee to Protect Journalists (CPJ), the Inter Press Association (IAPA) and the regional division of the organization Freedom Forum in Buenos Aires, Argentina.

In March 1999 he was fired from El Nuevo Herald, in disagreement with the newspaper's editor Carlos Castaneda. Weeks later, he began his work at Terra Networks, as a subsidiary of Internet content Telefónica Group of Spain.

In September 2001, he became one of the founders of AmericaTeVe (WJAN) channel. For eight years, Nogueras interviewed Presidents, including Alvaro Uribe of Colombia, and Jose Maria Aznar from Spain, also political leaders of the Republican and Democratic parties in the United States, international personalities, writers, researchers, and artists. His reports, full of criticism, satire and transgressive questions, quickly caught the attention of the South Florida viewers, which placed him as one of their favorite reporters. Stories about the socio-political situation in Cuba, irregularities in the medical services of South Florida, and corruption scandals in condominium complexes in the cities of Miami and Hialeah, contributed to a greater recognition of their journalistic work, and a significant rating increased in Noticias 41. Between 2002 and 2004, Nogueras also worked as a writer at Telemundo 51. In September 2010, he was incorporated to the Mega News team as a reporter on the station Mega TV Channel 22, Spanish Broadcasting System (SBS). In December 2010, management canceled the space for low ratings. Since February 2011, Nogueras is a freelance reporter for GenTV News, Channel 8.

He is a fan of the Argentine team Boca Juniors.
