= María Vallejo-Nágera =

Spanish novelist (born 1964)

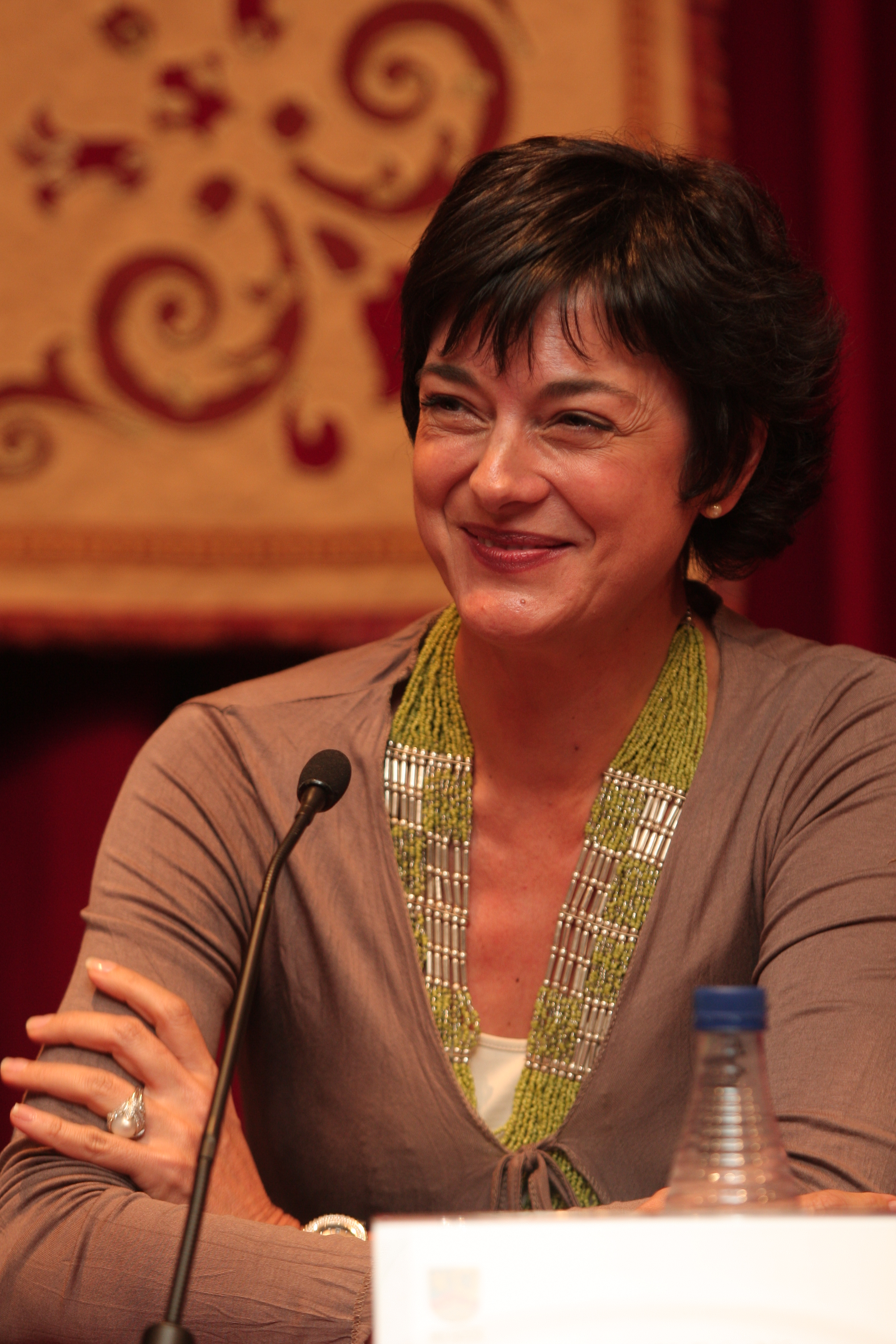
- Born: 6 May 1964 (age 62); Madrid, Spain
- Occupation: Novelist

María Vallejo-Nágera or María Vallejo-Nágera Zóbel (born 6 May 1964) is Spanish novelist.

== Life ==
Vallejo-Nágera was born in Madrid in 1964 as the third daughter of the writer Juan Antonio Vallejo-Nágera and María Victoria Zóbel de Ayala y Pfitz. Her grandfather is the controversial Antonio Vallejo-Nájera. Her family is an important one in the Philippines. She is the cousin of Samantha and Nicolás Vallejo-Nágera "Colate", and niece of the painter Fernando Zóbel. She studied at the Colegio de Nuestra Señora de los Rosales, before going on to study teaching at Complutense University in four rather than the usual five years.

Shortly after she married and had two twin daughters: Beatriz and Cristina, her husband's work took them to London. She used her time there writing children's stories. In the winter of 1997, while she was pregnant with her third son Gonzalo, she began writing her first novel In an Andalusian corner. When she finished it, she looked for a place to publish it and sent it to the Premio Planeta de Novela with the idea of going to the publishing house afterwards to ask for advice on how to improve it. Surprisingly the novel was selected as a finalist from four hundred submissions, being fifth in the final vote.

In parallel with these events Vallejo-Nagera visited Medjugorje where she reported that she had received a re-conversion to the Catholic faith. She had been brought up as a Catholic but had moved away as she grew older. She reported later that this was a single spiritual event on 8 May 1999 although it was six months before she admitted it to a priest as she was worried that people might question her sanity.

To prepare the publication of her book Women of Light, Maria attended a master's degree in leadership for people over fifty and three courses in theology and early Christianity at Harvard University. She was associated with Harvard's Advanced Leadership Initiative in 2017.

== Selected works ==
- In an Andalusian corner, 2000
- Black Moon: The light of Father Pateras, Barcelona, Belacqua, 2000
- The punishment of the angels, Barcelona, Planet, 2001
- A messenger at night: A chilling story based on a real event, Barcelona, Belacqua, 2003
- The nurse, Barcelona, Editions B, 2005
- The courtyard of silences, Barcelona, Styria, 2005
- Between the sky and the earth. Curious stories of purgatory. Barcelona, Planet, 2007
- Mala Tierra, Madrid, Citadel, 2009
- Lola Torbellino, Barcelona, Editions B, 2010
- Lola Whirlwind on the beach, Barcelona, Editions B, 2011
- Heaven and hell: truths of God, Madrid, Free Books, 2012
- From María to María: Puerta del cielo, Madrid, Word, 2014
- La Nodriza, 2014
- Juana Girl: The mystery of Cubas de la Sagra, Madrid, The sphere of Books, 2016
- Women of light, Barcelona, The sphere of books, 2018
- Walking through the sky, Madrid, Word, 2019
