= Nogueira =

Nogueira is a surname of Galician and Portuguese origin meaning walnut tree.

== People with the surname ==
- Antônio Rodrigo "Minotauro" Nogueira (born 1976), Brazilian MMA fighter
- Antônio Rogério Nogueira, the "Minotouro" (born 1976), Brazilian MMA fighter, twin brother of Antônio Rodrigo Nogueira
- Bernardo de Sá Nogueira de Figueiredo (1795–1876), Portuguese politician
- Camilo Nogueira Román (born 1936), Spanish politician
- Fernando Nogueira (born 1950), Portuguese politician
- Fabricio Nogueira Nascimento (born 1976), Brazilian footballer
- Fernando António Nogueira Pessoa (1888–1935), Portuguese poet
- Isabelle Nogueira (born 1992), Brazilian dancer and model
- Lucas Nogueira (born 1992), Brazilian basketball player
- Maria Alexandra Nogueira Vieira (born 1966), Portuguese teacher and politician
- Mikayla Nogueira (born 1998), American social media influencer and make-up artist
- Patrick Nogueira (born 1996), Brazilian murderer
- Paulinho Nogueira (1929–2003), Brazilian musician
- Paulo Nogueira Neto (born 1922), Brazilian environmentalist
- Victor Nogueira (born 1959), Mozambique-born American soccer goalkeeper
- Wellington Damião Nogueira Marinho (born 1981), Brazilian footballer
- Tadeu Jesus Nogueira Júnior (born 1981), Juninho, Brazilian footballer
- Nogueira Ferrão, Portuguese family name
- Vincent Nogueira (born 1988), French footballer
- Waldirene Nogueira (1945–2026), Brazilian manicurist

== Places ==
=== Brazil ===
- Nogueira, Bahia, a municipality of the State of Bahia
- Artur Nogueira, a municipality of the State of São Paulo
- Nogueira, Amazonas, a village on the shore of Lake Tefe, State of Amazonas

=== Portugal ===
- Nogueira (Braga), a civil parish in the municipality of Braga
- Nogueira (Bragança), a civil parish in the municipality of Bragança
- Nogueira (Lousada), a civil parish in the municipality of Lousada
- Nogueira (Maia), a civil parish in the municipality of Maia
- Nogueira (Ponte da Barca), a civil parish in the municipality of Ponte da Barca
- Nogueira (Viana do Castelo), a civil parish in the municipality of Viana do Castelo
- Nogueira (Vila Nova de Cerveira), a civil parish in the municipality of Vila Nova de Cerveira
- Nogueira (Vila Real), a civil parish in the municipality of Vila Real

== See also ==
- Noguera, the Spanish-language variant of this surname
