= Cienfuegos (disambiguation) =

Cienfuegos is a city on the southern coast of Cuba.

Cienfuegos may also refer to:

== Geography ==
- Camilo Cienfuegos (Santa Cruz del Norte), a village in Cuba
- Cienfuegos Bay
- Cienfuegos Province, the province in which the city of Cienfuegos is located
- Historic Centre of Cienfuegos

== People with the surname ==
- Camilo Cienfuegos (1932–1959), one of the Cuban Revolution's four major figures
- Fr. José Ignacio Cienfuegos Arteaga, a Chilean priest, Roman Catholic bishop of Concepción and political figure. He served twice as President of the Senate of Chile
- Mauricio Cienfuegos, a retired Salvadoran football player
- Nicasio Álvarez de Cienfuegos, a Spanish poet and publicist
- Osmany Cienfuegos (1931–2025), Cuban politician, brother of Camilo
- Salvador Cienfuegos Zepeda, a Mexican division general and Secretary of National Defense

== Sport ==
- Cienfuegos (Cuban National Series), an amateur baseball team in the Cuban National Series
- Cienfuegos (Cuban League baseball club), a defunct professional baseball team from the Cuban League
- FC Cienfuegos, a football club in the Campeonato Nacional de Fútbol de Cuba

== Other ==
- Battle of Cienfuegos, a minor engagement of the Spanish–American War
- Cienfuegos press, an Anarchist publishing house
