= Castillo de Jagua =

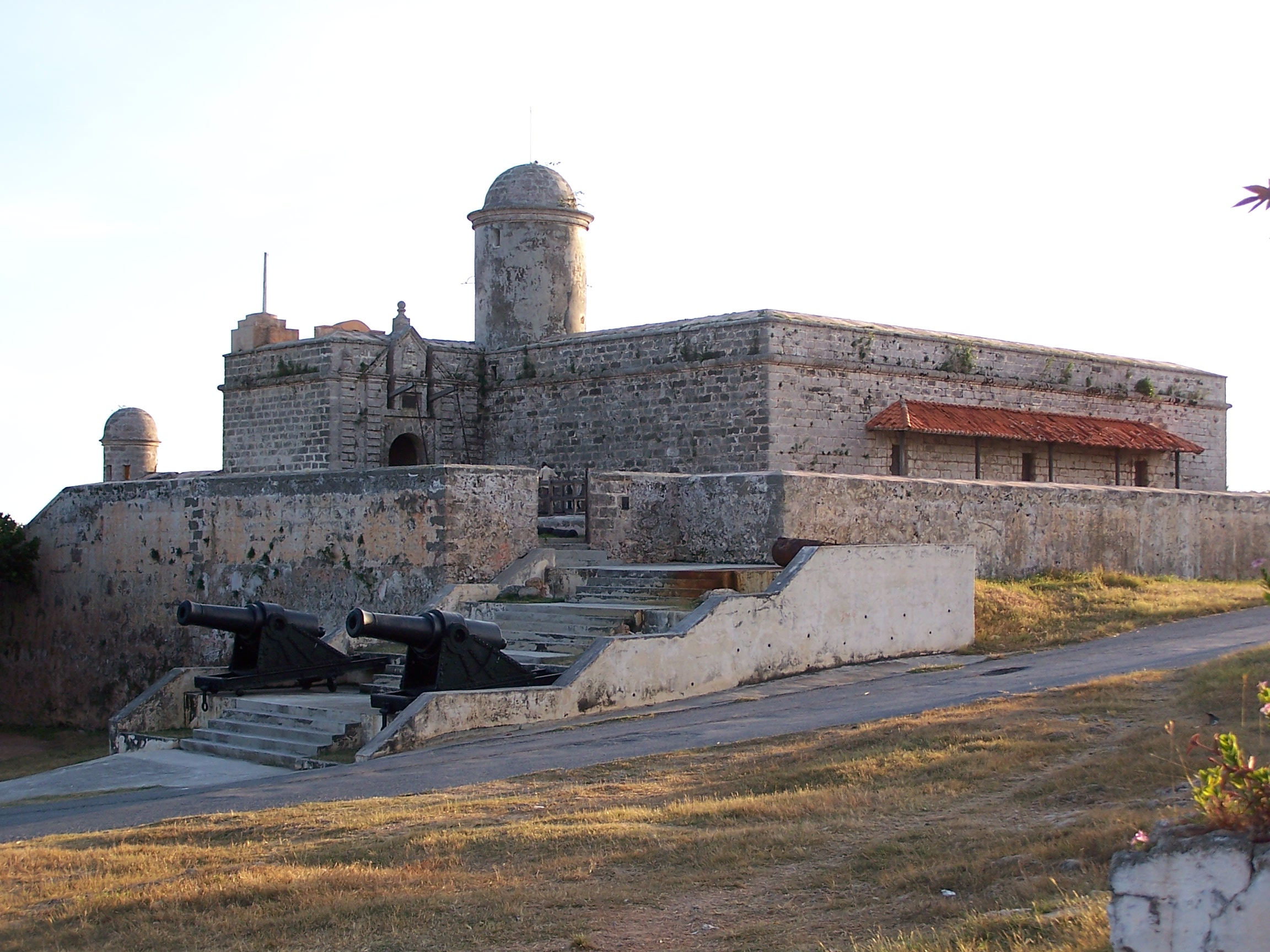

- Location within Cuba

General information
- Architectural style: Spanish Colonial architecture
- Location: Cienfuegos, Cuba
- Coordinates: 22°04′N 80°28′W
- Completed: 1742

The Castle of Jagua (Spanish: Castillo de Jagua) is a fortress south of Cienfuegos in Cuba. It is located near the entrance to the Cienfuegos Bay (Spanish: Bahía de Cienfuegos), in the port of Jagua. It was originally named "Castillo (or Fortaleza) de Nuestra Señora de los Ángeles de Jagua" (Castle -or Fortress- of Our Lady of the Angels of Jagua). It was built in 1742.

== History ==
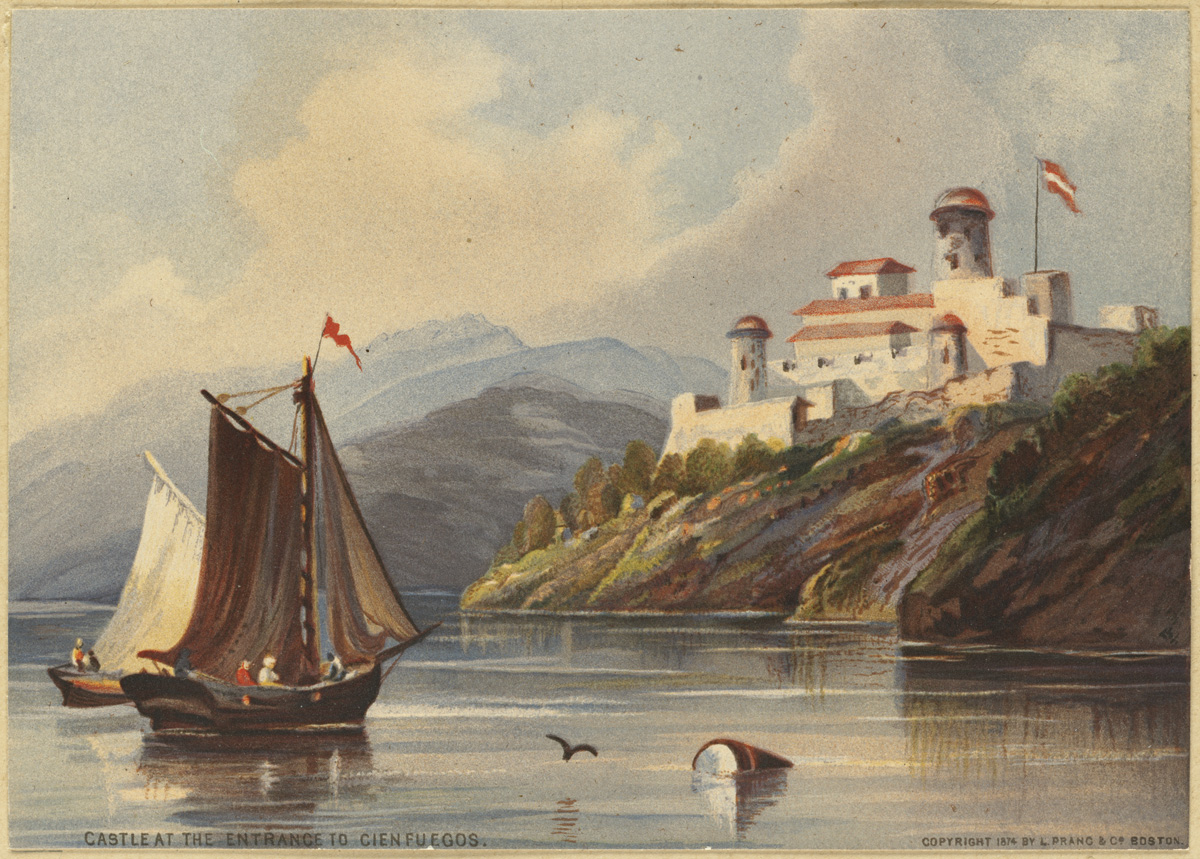
"Castle at the Entrance to Cienfuegos" (Castillo de Jagua), painting of 1855, by Granville Perkins. Boston Public Library.

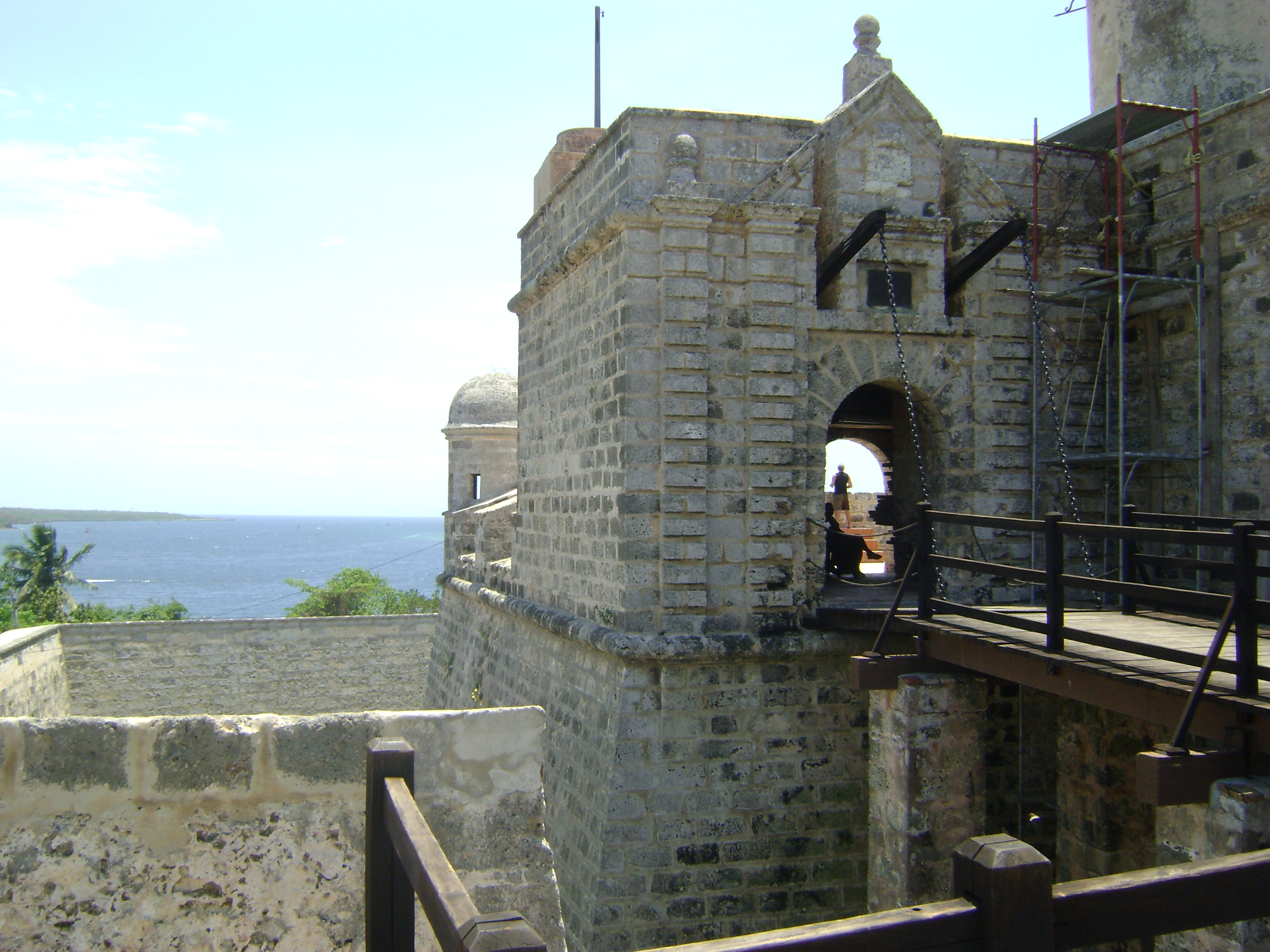
Gate and drawbridge

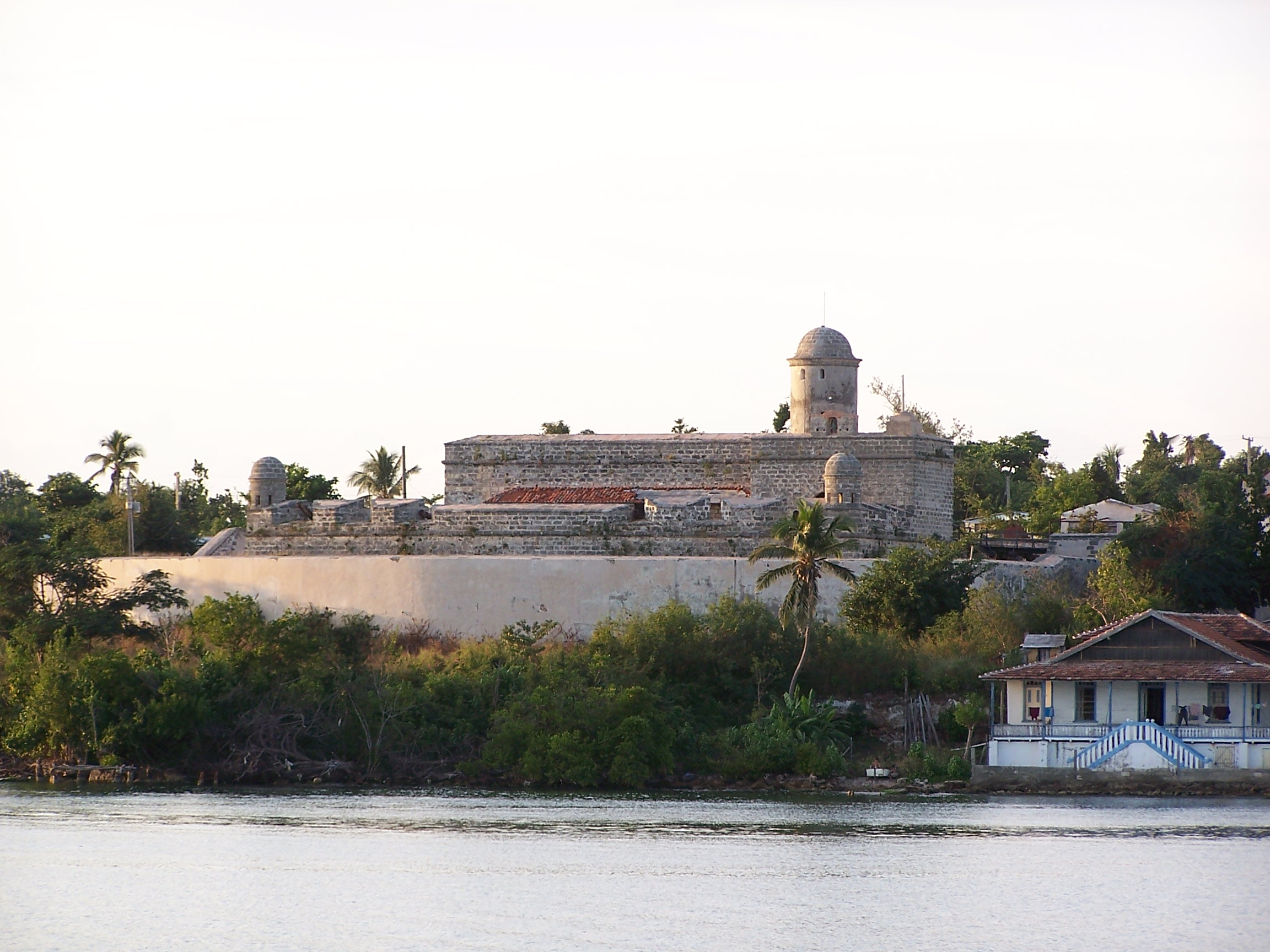
Jagua fortress

The fortress, also called the castle, was erected by King Philip V of Spain (1683-1746) in 1742 to protect the bay from pirates who prowled the Caribbean coast in those days. They used it as refuge at landfall, on their way to the city of Cienfuegos (founded on April 22, 1819, by French colonists, bordering the Bay of Jagua), seeking collect water, food and other supplies.

The fort is built in solid limestone, has several floors, a well, a watch tower and a moat that was never flooded. It also has a drawbridge in perfect condition, one of the last to remain fit for use.

Since the coastal city of Cienfuegos was built at the end of the 1810s; its harbor, guarded by the fortress, became one of the most important centers of commerce in the central part of the "Island of Cuba" during that period of the colony, and to this day remains one essential port on the country's economy.

Publications and others graphic demonstrations, have been in charge for long time, that these marvels of Cuban colonial architecture, not be forgotten. This is the case of banknotes, "Exchange Certificate" of 10 pesos, Letters A (reds) and B (greens), issued during the 1980s, and taken out of circulation, "as special legal tender" in the late 1980s and early 1990s; in its back, these banknotes, have a beautiful and attractive design of that "Castle" (a great drawing) to perpetuate forever, in the Numismatics history of the Big Island of the Antilles.

The castle is located in front of the entrance to the bay. Nearby is the abandoned Nuclear City that was never completed due to the disintegration of the USSR.

== Gallery ==
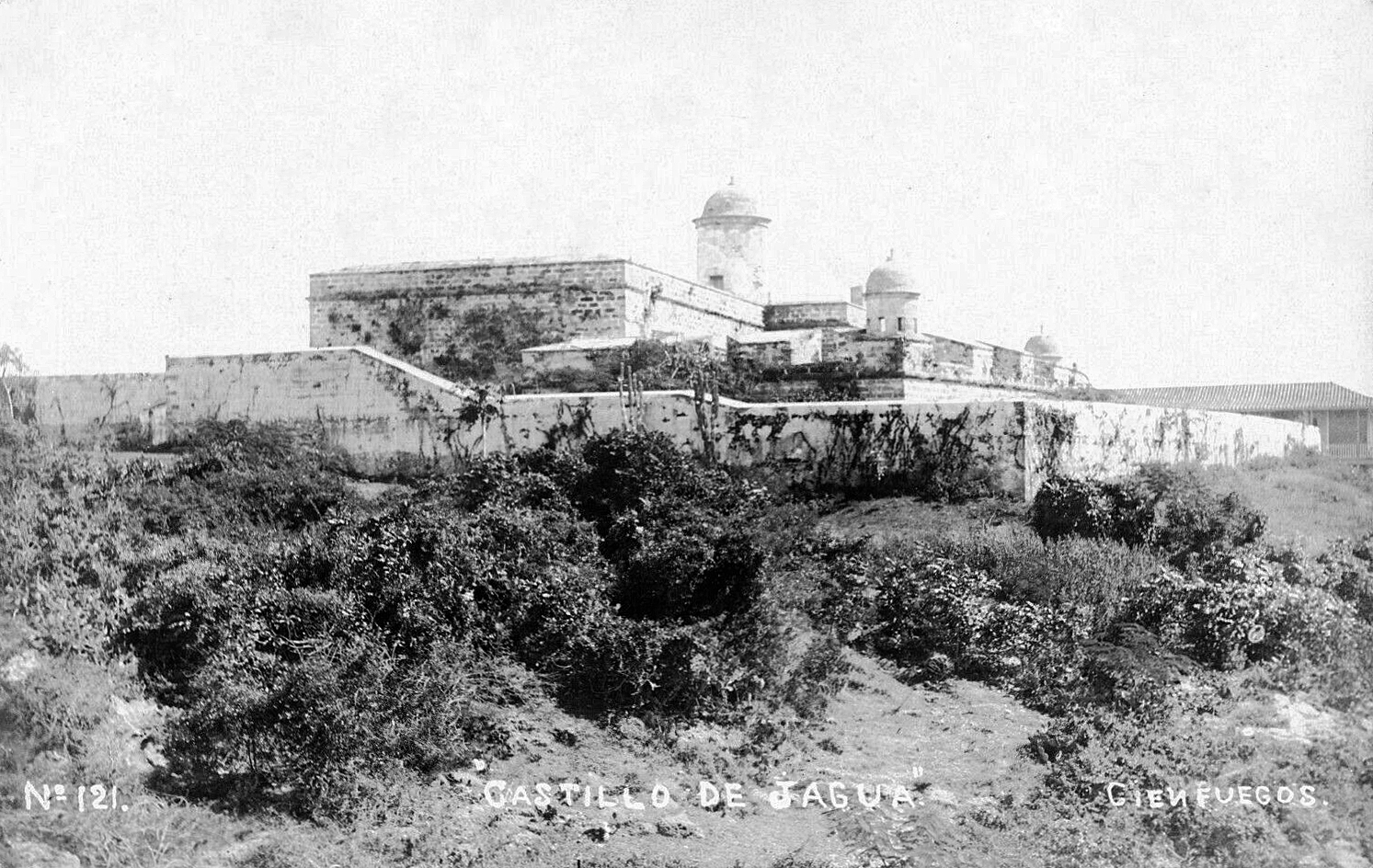
Castillo de Jagua, photo of 1925.

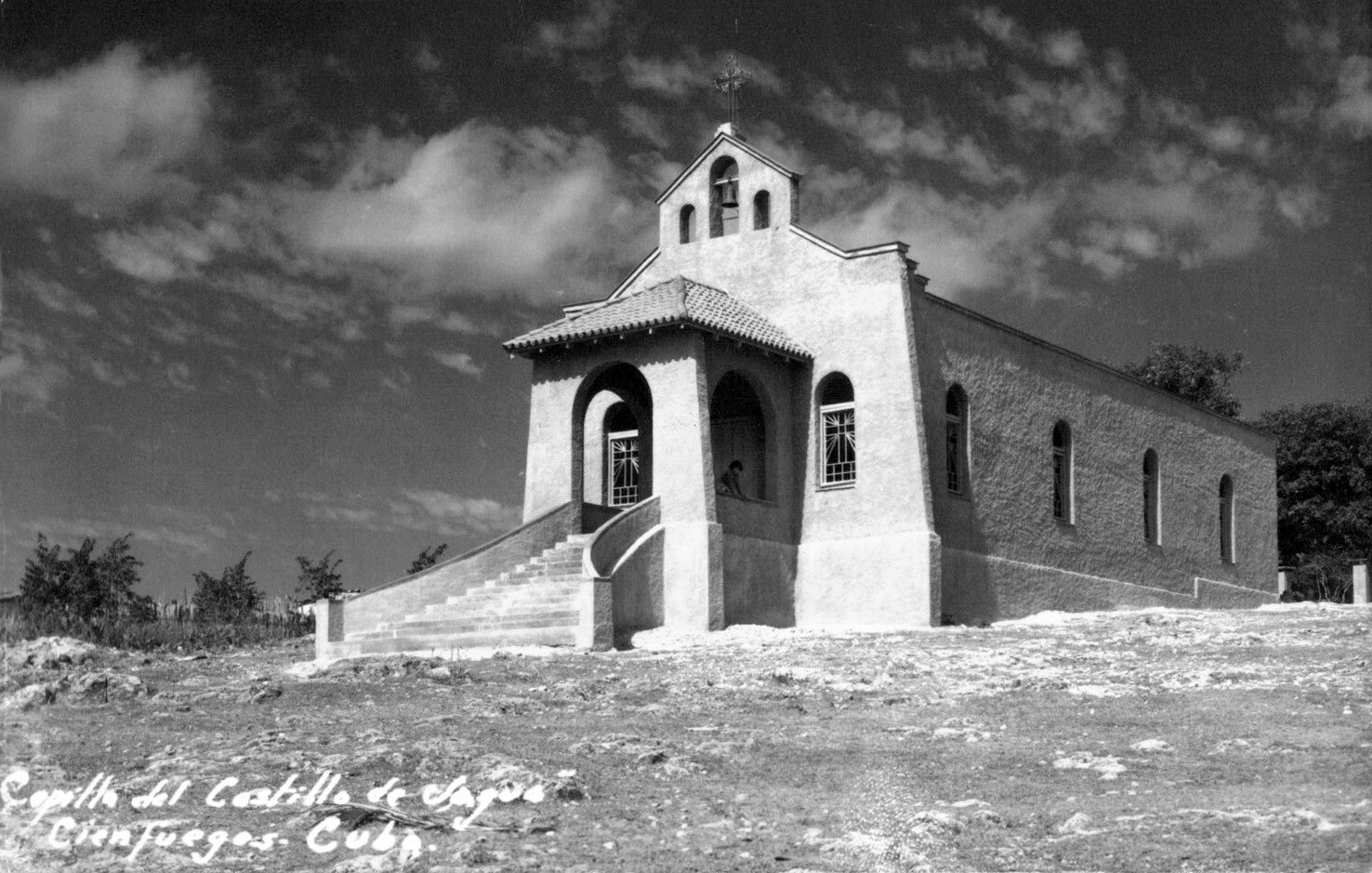
Chapel of the Castillo de Jagua (from the 18th-century), photo of 1945.

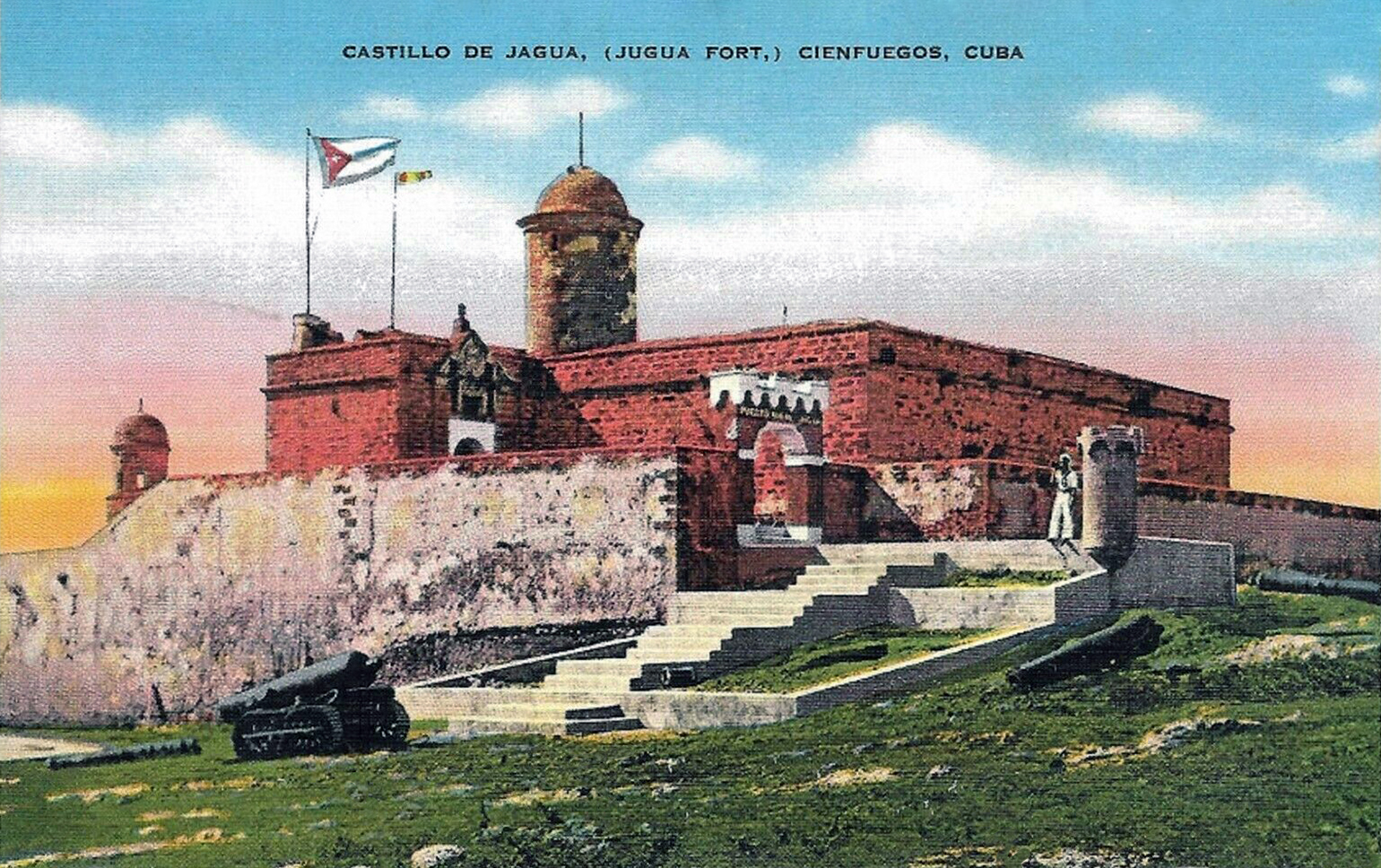
Castillo de Jagua, postcard of 1940.

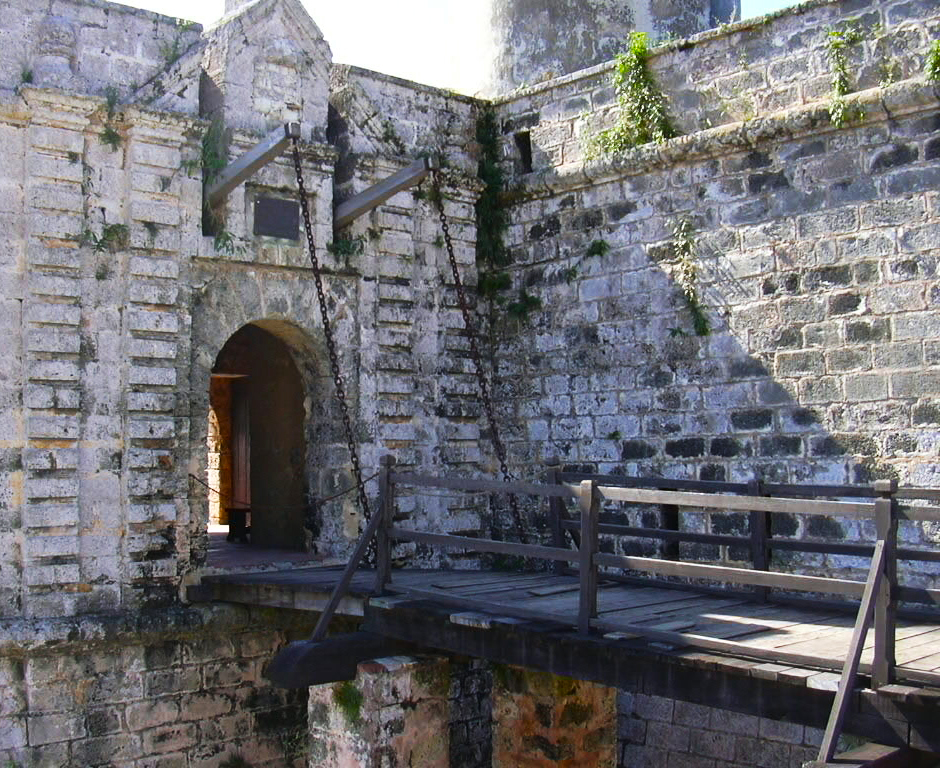
Gate and drawbridge

== See also ==
- Historic Centre of Cienfuegos
- Jardín Botánico de Cienfuegos
- Juraguá
- Juragua Nuclear Power Plant
