= Historic Centre of Cienfuegos =

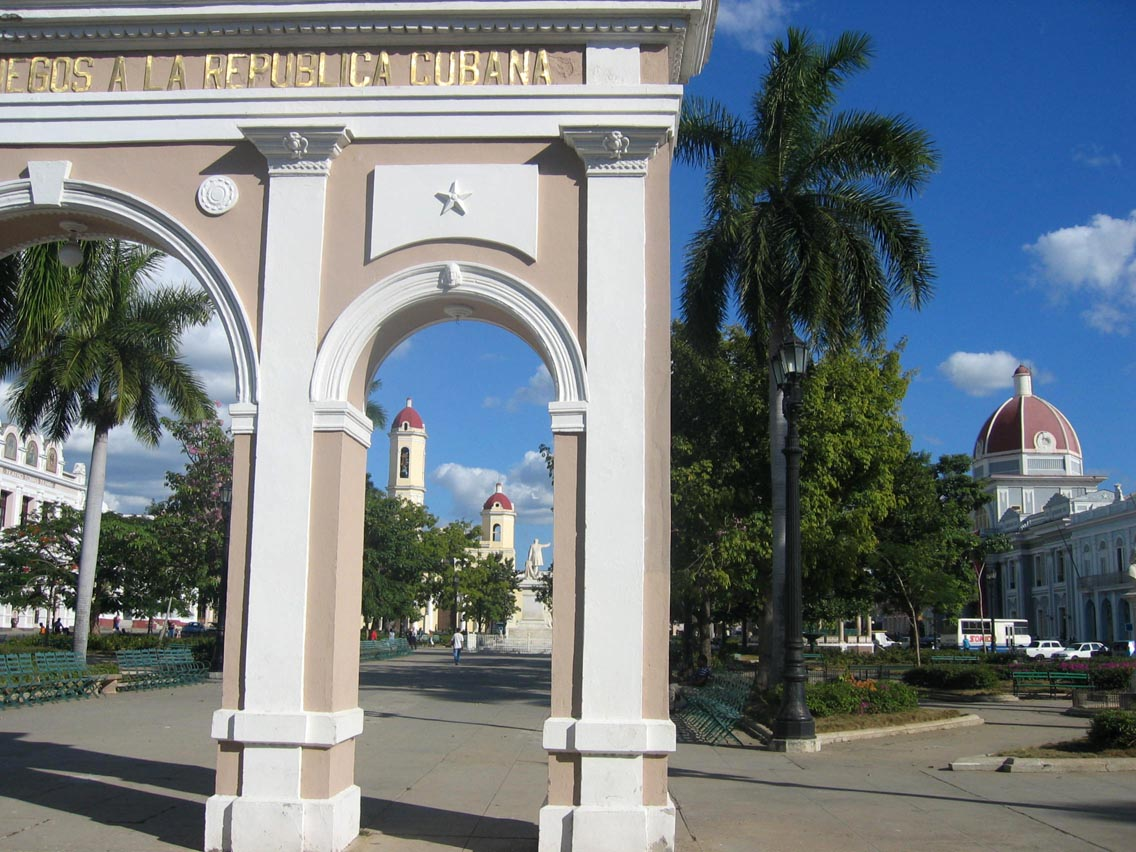
- Central Park José Marti
- Location: Cienfuegos, Cuba
- Coordinates: 22°08′44″N 80°26′11″W
- Founded: 1819

UNESCO World Heritage Site
- Official name: Urban Historic Centre of Cienfuegos
- Type: Cultural
- Criteria: ii, v
- Designated: 2005 (29th session)
- Reference no.: 1202
- Region: Latin America and the Caribbean

The Historic Centre of Cienfuegos, is located in the city of Cienfuegos in Cuba. It was declared a UNESCO World Heritage Site in 2005, because of its outstanding Neoclassical architecture and its status as the best example of early 19th century Spanish urban planning. The historic centre contains six buildings from 1819 to 1850, 327 buildings from 1851 to 1900, and 1188 buildings from the 20th century.

== History ==
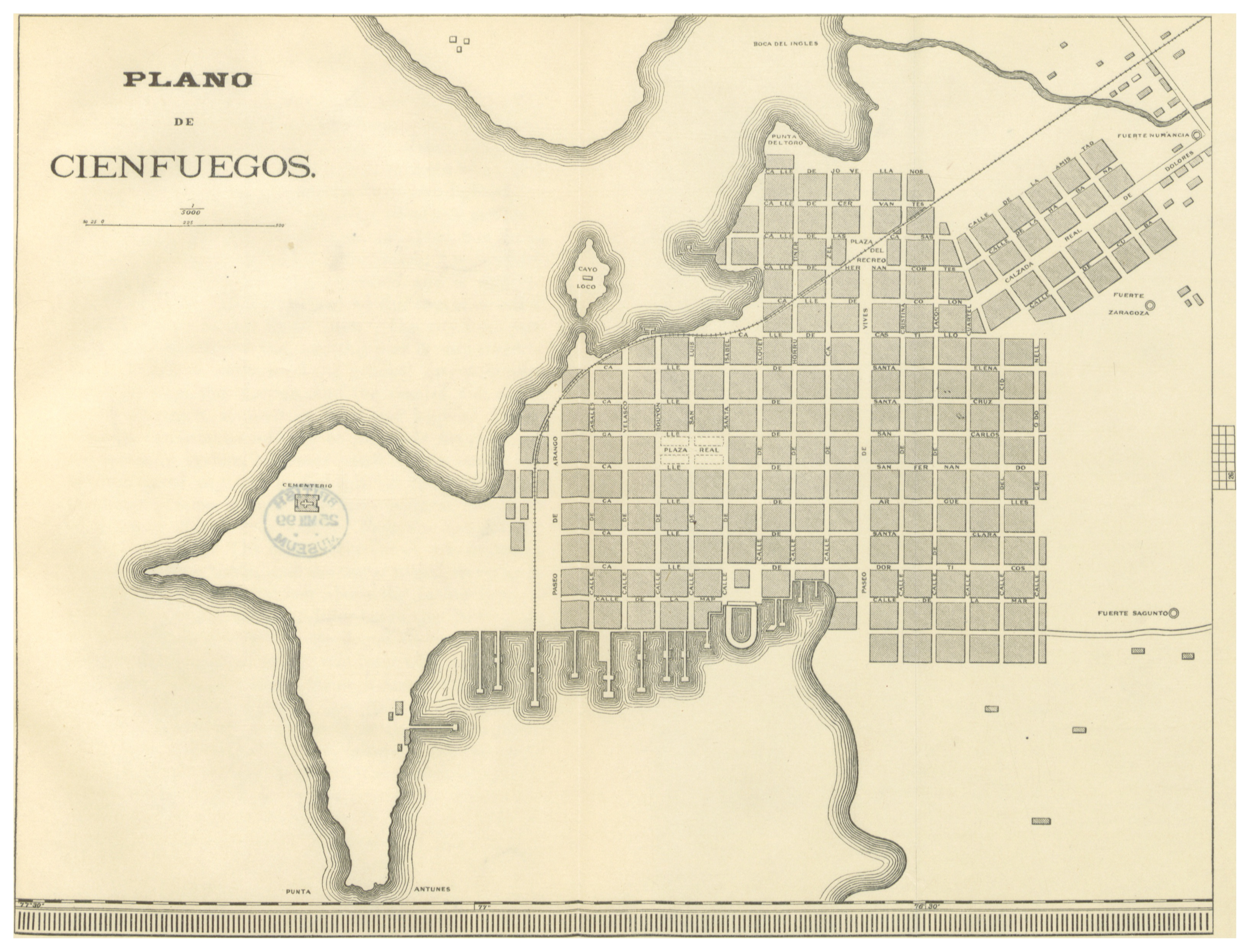
Cienfuegos city plan (1899)

While visited by Columbus in 1494, the area was first settled by pirates and freebooters beginning in the 1600s. Early settlers, often referred to as "buccaneers", raised cattle and made jerky to supply to the privateers and others who sought refuge in the bay. By 1740 they were raising tobacco as well.

In 1742 King Philip V of Spain built Fort Jagua to suppress the pirates' use of Cienfuegos Bay. The city was formally founded on 22 April 1819 by French and Spanish settlers under the command of Don Luis De Clouet y Favrot. The streets were laid out essentially north–south, east–west, forming square blocks. Today, the city centre still retains eclectic architecture from the nineteenth and early twentieth centuries, much with neoclassical decoration.

== Landmarks of the Historical Center ==
- Our Lady of the Immaculate Conception Cathedral.
- Arch of Triumph.
- The Botanical Garden of Cienfuegos declared National Monument on October 20, 1989, with 97 hectares.
- The Reina Cemetery is an exceptional example of its type, and its architecture is inserted in the prevailing neoclassical in the buildings constructed in the city. Is the only in Cuba that retains its niches for burials.
- The Fortress of Nuestra Señora de los Ángeles de Jagua (Fort Jagua) is located at the entrance to Cienfuegos Bay. Strategically located at the entrance to the Port of Cienfuegos, this castle was built in the 18th century (1745) to defend Cienfuegos from the assaults of pirates and buccaneers.
- Tomás Acea Cemetery.
- José Martí Park.
- The Theatre Tomas Terry.
- University of Cienfuegos.

== Gallery ==
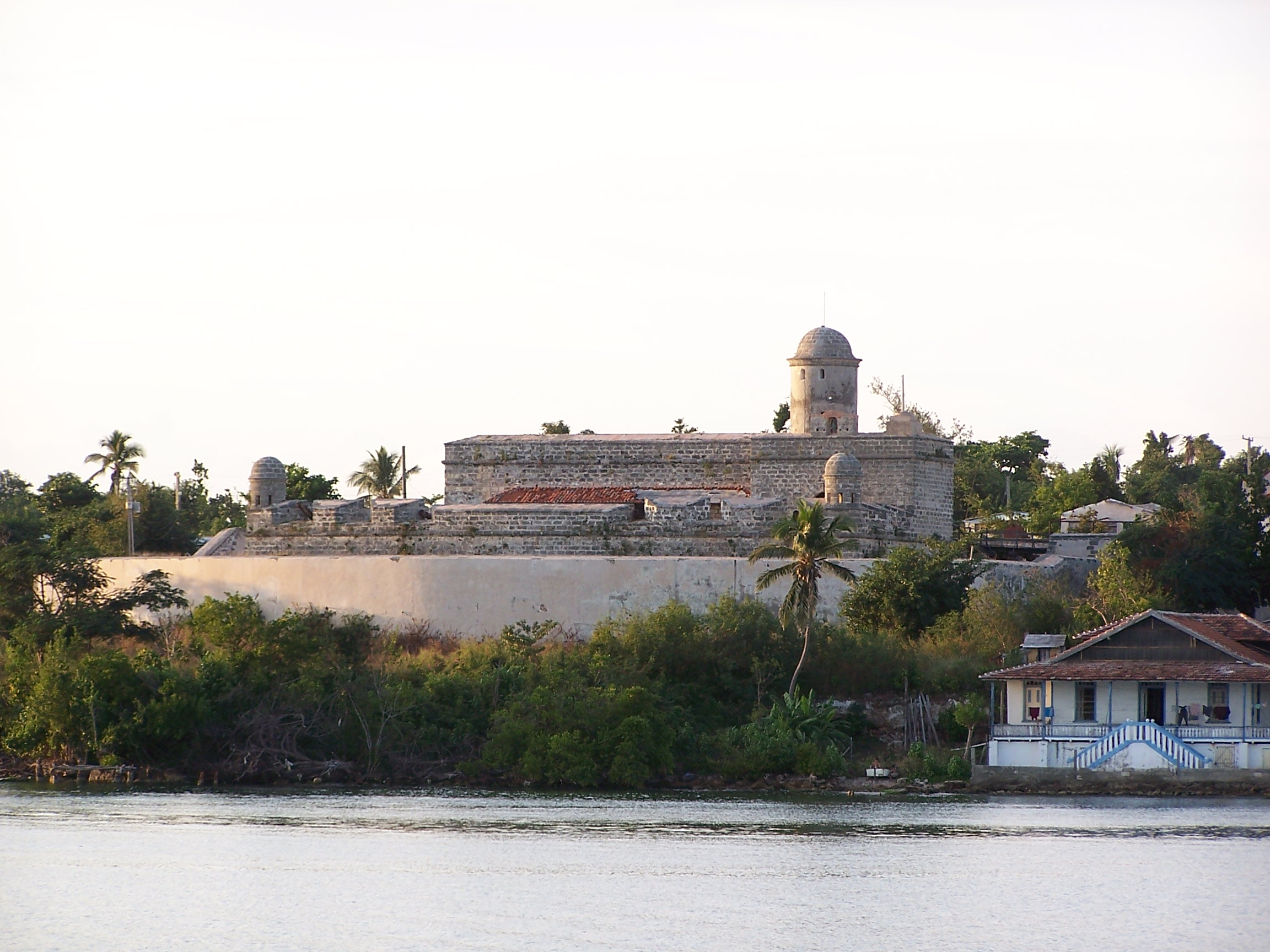
View of Fort Jagua.

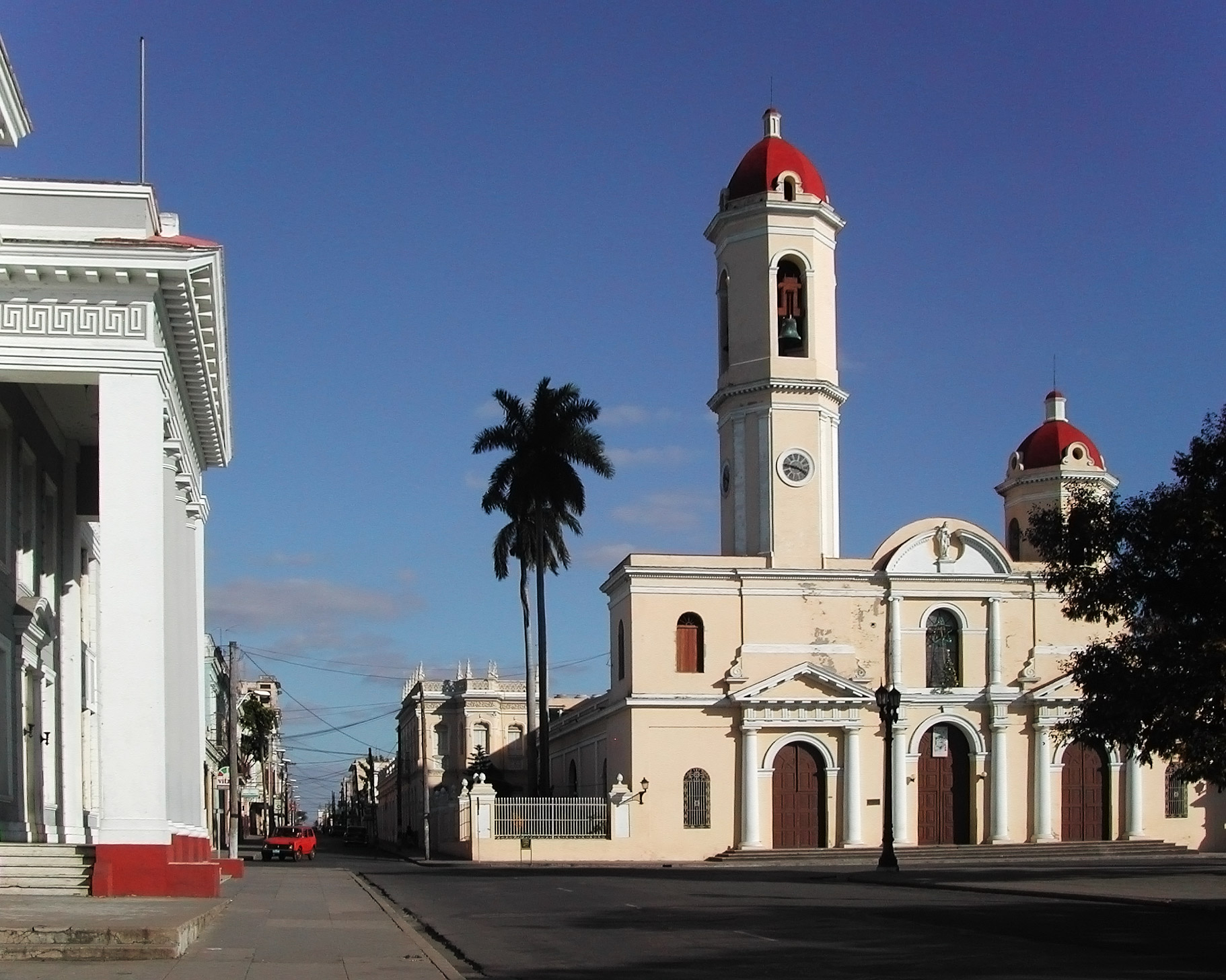
Cathedral of Cienfuegos.

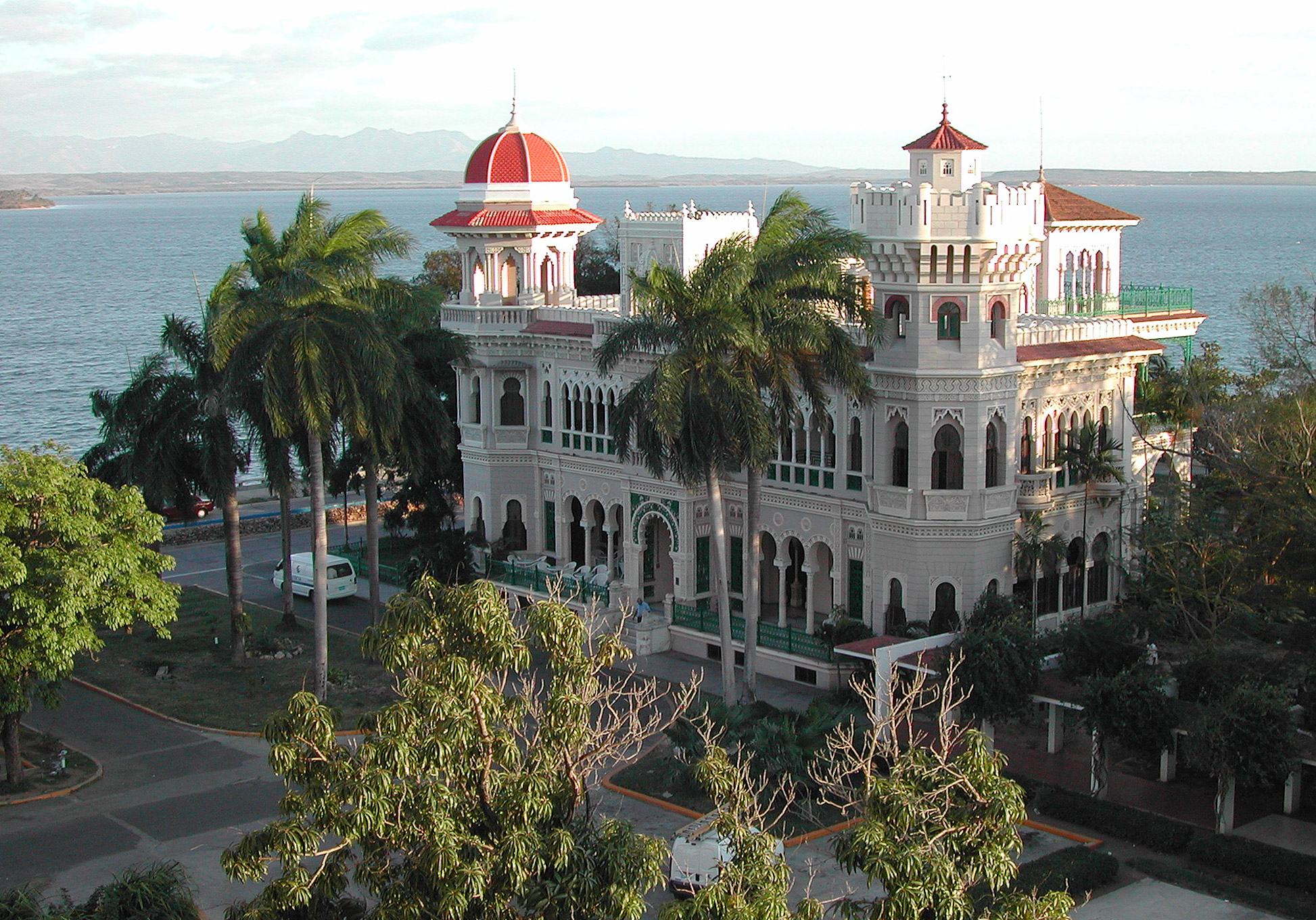
Valle's Palace.

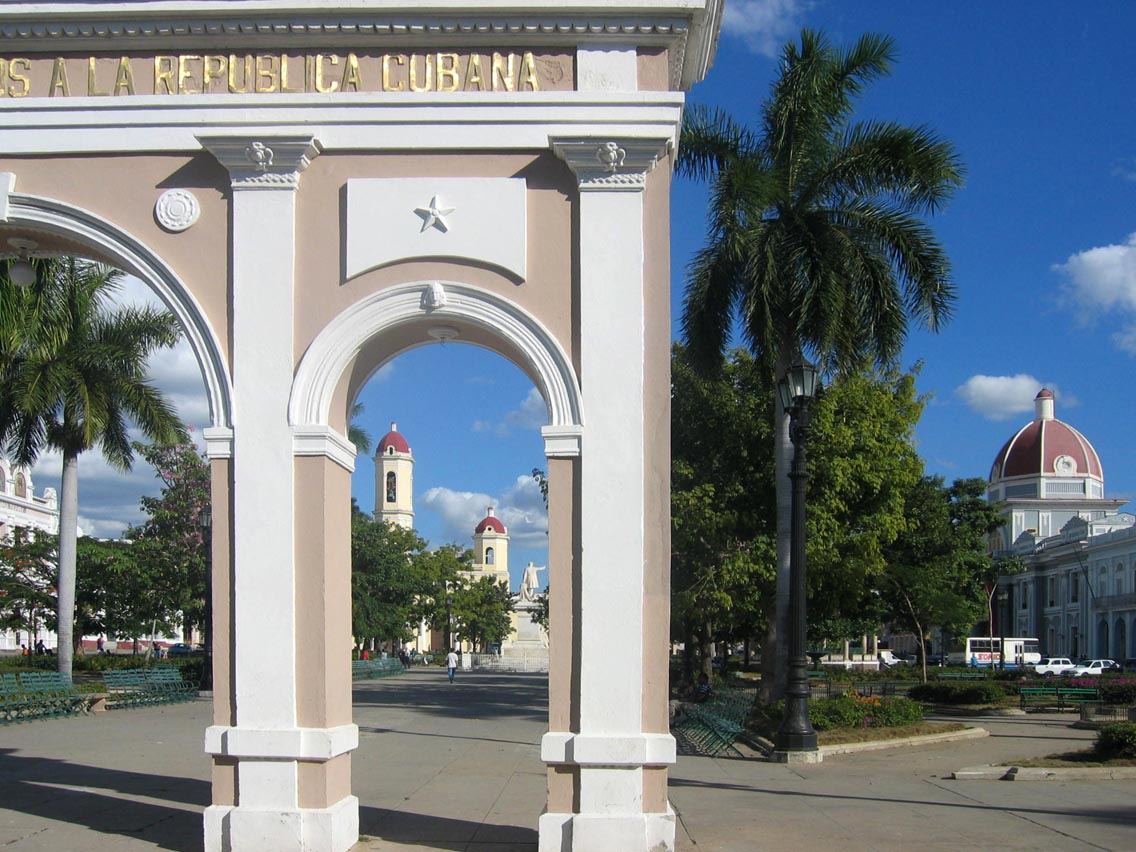
Park José Martí.
