= Matun =

Matun may refer to:

- Matun, Afghanistan
- Matun, Zaoqiang County (马屯镇), town in Zaoqiang County, Hebei, China
- Matun, Mengjin County (麻屯镇), town in Mengjin County, Henan, China
- Matun, Cuba
