= Juraguá =

- Village
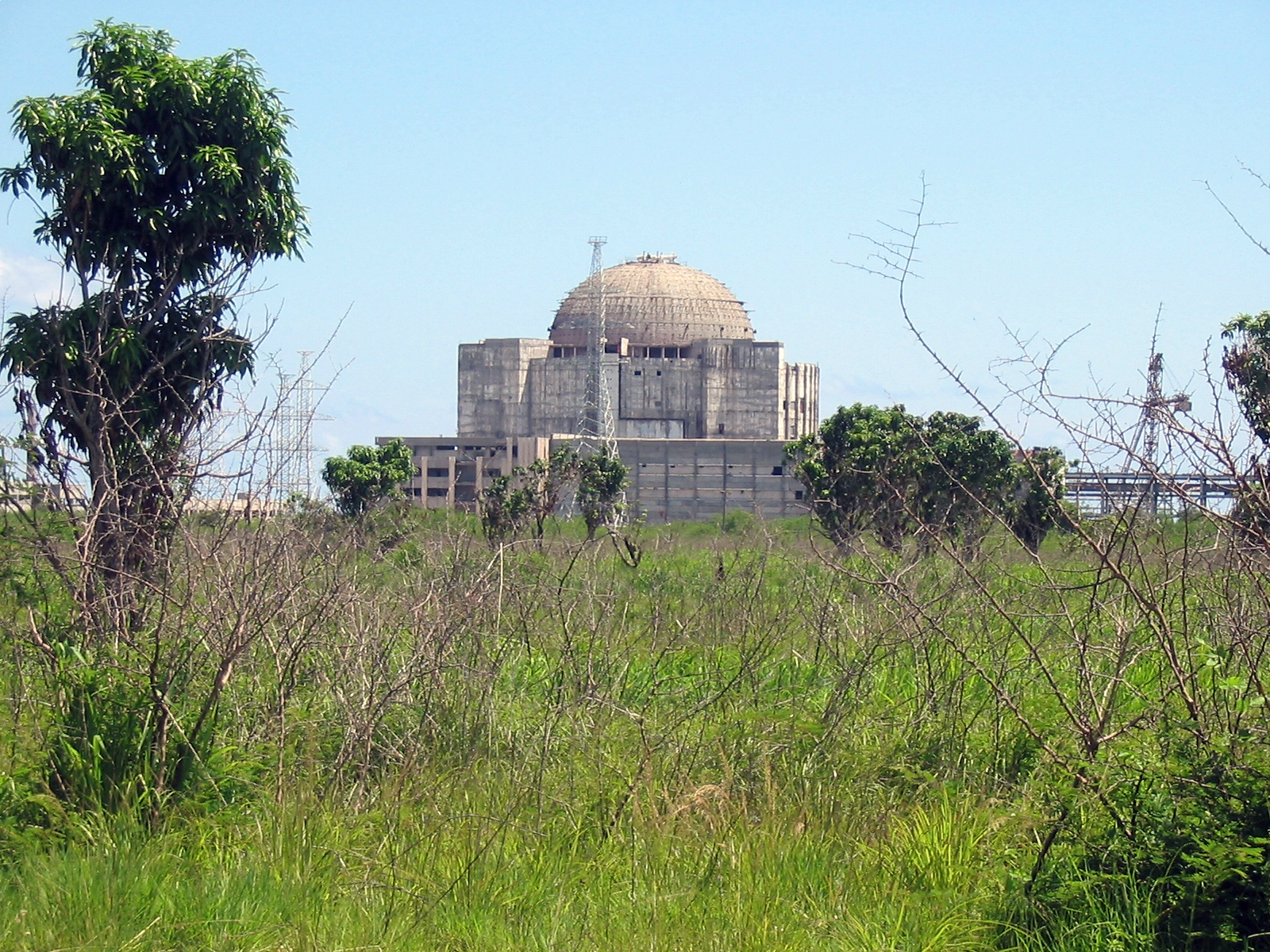
- View of the nearby Juragua Nuclear Power Plant

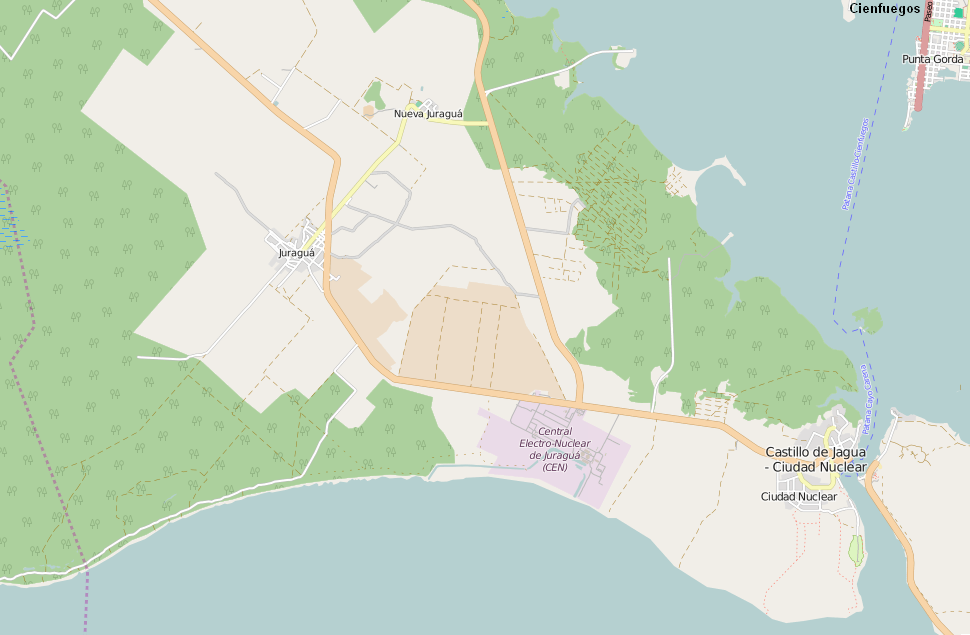
- OSM map showing Juraguá and its surrounding area. The nearby nuclear plant, the Jagua Fortress, the village of Nueva Juraguá and a bit of the city of Cienfuegos, are shown in the map

- Location of Juraguá in Cuba
- Coordinates: 22°05′52.1″N 80°33′24.4″W
- Country: Cuba
- Province: Cienfuegos
- Municipality: Abreus
- Founded: 1849
- Elevation: 30 m (98 ft)

Population
  - Total: ca. 7,000
- Time zone: UTC-5 (EST)
- Area code: +53-432

Juraguá is a Cuban village and consejo popular ("people's council", i.e. hamlet) of the municipality of Abreus, in Cienfuegos Province. With a population of ca. 7,000 it is the most populated village in the municipality after Abreus.

== History ==
The village was founded in 1849 by Tomás Terry Adans as a farm (Central Juraguá) and grew around the homonym henequenera, a plantation of henequen that produces and packages sisal fiber, founded in 1923.

In 1976 Cuba and the Soviet Union signed an agreement to construct two nuclear power reactors near Juraguá, and the construction of Juragua Nuclear Power Plant, the only one built in Cuba, started in 1983. Named after the village, but located within Cienfuegos municipal territory, it was not completed and abandoned in 2000.

== Geography ==
Located on a peninsula between Cienfuegos Bay and the Caribbean Sea, Juraguá lies near the borders of Matanzas Province at the Zapata Swamp (Cienaga de Zapata). The settlement extends south of a road linking Abreus (24 km north), to the Jagua Fortress (Castillo de Jagua, 11 km east). It is 3 km far from Nueva Juraguá, 5 from Juragua Nuclear Power Plant, 30 from Cienfuegos and Yaguaramas, and 35 from Rodas.

== Transport ==
Juraguá is served by the "Abreus-Jagua", a provincial road linked to the state highway Circuito Sur (CS). An industrial railway, starting in Aguada de Pasajeros and ending at the nuclear plant, crosses the village to the south.

== See also ==
- Matun
- Juragua Nuclear Power Plant
- Municipalities of Cuba
- List of cities in Cuba
