= Abreus, Cuba =

Municipality in Cienfuegos Province

Abreus
- Municipality
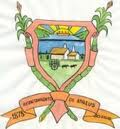
- Seal

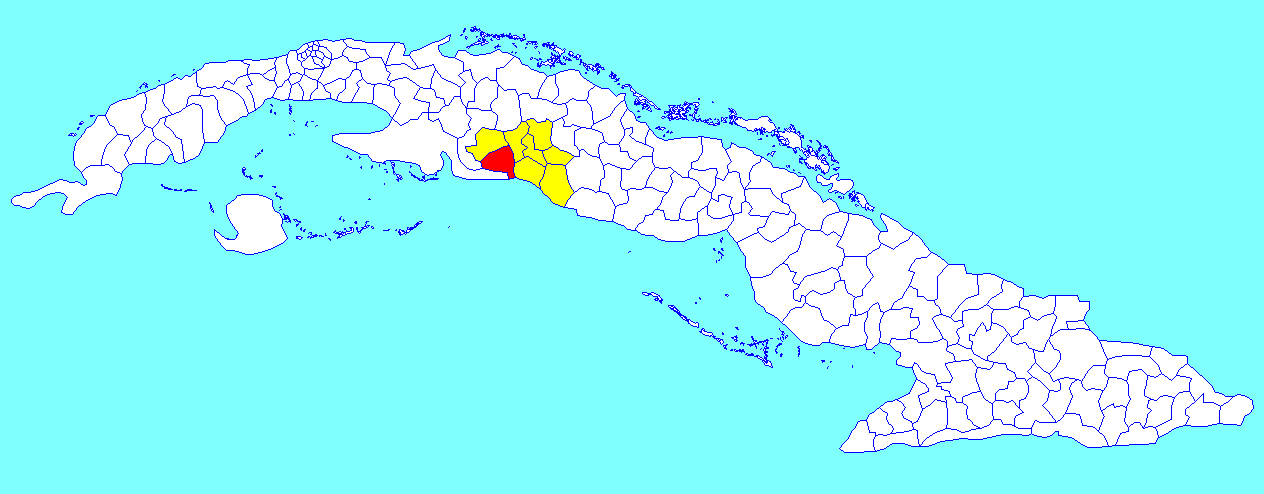
- Abreus municipality (red) within Cienfuegos Province (yellow) and Cuba
- Coordinates: 22°16′50″N 80°34′4″W
- Country: Cuba
- Province: Cienfuegos
- Founded: 1840
- Elevation: 60 m (200 ft)

Population (2019)
  - Total: 30,719
  - Density: 53/km^{2} (140/sq mi)
- Time zone: UTC-5 (EST)
- Area code: +53-432
- Website: https://abreus.gob.cu/

Abreus (Spanish pronunciation: [aˈβɾews]) is a municipality and town in the Cienfuegos Province of Cuba. It was founded in 1840.

== History ==
Abreus was founded as San Segundo de los Abreu in 1840 by Trinidadian landowners during an economic boom of slave-labor sugar cane plantations.

== Geography ==
The municipality includes the town of Abreus and the villages of Babiney, Carmelina, Cayo Grande, Charcas, Cienguita, Constancia, Horquitas, Juraguá, Matun, Mijailito, Navarra, Nueva Juraguá, San Ignacio, Simpatía and Yaguaramas. It is bordered by Ciénaga de Zapata and Calimete, both in Matanzas Province, and by Aguada de Pasajeros, Rodas and Cienfuegos.

== Demographics ==
In 2019, the municipality of Abreus had a population of 30,719; 51% of the population identified as men. With a total area of 579 km^{2} (224 sq mi) it has a population density of 53/km^{2} (140/sq mi).

== Notable natives ==
- Ángel Fleitas (1914–2006), baseball player
- José Irisarri (1895–1968), politician and lawyer
- Yoán Moncada (born 1995), baseball player
- Olfides Sáez (born 1994), weightlifter

== See also ==
- Municipalities of Cuba
- List of cities in Cuba
- Juragua Nuclear Power Plant
