= List of botanical gardens in Cuba =

Botanical gardens in Cuba have collections consisting entirely of Cuba native and endemic species; most have a collection that include plants from around the world. There are botanical gardens and arboreta in all states and territories of Cuba, most are administered by local governments, some are privately owned.

- Cuban National Botanic Garden, Havana
- Jardín Botánico de Cienfuegos, Cienfuegos (also known as Jardín Botánico Soledad)
- Jardín Botánico Cupaynicu, Granma Province
- Jardín de los Helechos de Santiago de Cuba, Santiago de Cuba
- Instituto de Investigaciones Fundamentales en Agricultura Tropical „Alejandro de Humboldt“, Havana
- Jardín Botánico Orquideario Soroa, Candelaria, Cuba
- Jardín Botánico de Pinar del Río, Pinar del Río
- Jardín Botánico de Sancti Spiritus, Sancti Spíritus
- Estación experimental de plantas medicinales Dr. Juan T. Roig
- Jardín Botánico de Holguín
- Jardín Botánico de Matanzas
- Jardín Botánico de Villa Clara
