= Ángel Fleitas =

Cuban baseball player (1914–2006)

- Shortstop
- Born: November 10, 1914; Abreus, Cuba
- Died: July 10, 2006 (aged 91); Miami, Florida, U.S.
- Batted: Right Threw: Right

MLB debut
- July 5, 1948, for the Washington Senators

Last MLB appearance
- August 10, 1948, for the Washington Senators

MLB statistics
- Batting average: .077
- Home runs: 0
- Runs batted in: 1
- Stats at Baseball Reference

Teams
- Washington Senators (1948)

Ángel Fleitas
Medal record

Representing Cuba

Men's baseball

Baseball World Cup
Gold medal – first place	1943 Havana	Team
Bronze medal – third place	1944 Caracas	Team

Ángel Félix Fleitas Husta (November 10, 1914 – July 10, 2006) was a Cuban Major League Baseball shortstop.

== Playing career ==
He made his major league debut at age 33 for the Washington Senators, playing in 15 games and going 1-for-13 at the plate. Prior to his major league career, he played in two Amateur World Series for Cuba in 1943 and 1944.

His younger brother, Andrés Fleitas, was a long-time baseball star in Cuba, Mexico, and in the minor leagues.

== Sources ==
- Career statistics from Baseball Reference · Baseball Reference (Minors) · Retrosheet · Baseball Almanac
