= Granville Perkins =

American illustrator and painter

- Born: 1830; Baltimore, Maryland, US
- Died: 1895 (aged 64–65); New York City, US
- Occupations: American illustrator and painter

Granville Perkins (1830–1895) was an American illustrator and painter, best known for landscape and marine subjects. He contributed illustrations to numerous journals and books of the 1870s and 1880s. He also painted in oils and watercolors, and exhibited his work at the Pennsylvania Academy of the Fine Arts and the National Academy of Design.

== Biography ==
Born in Baltimore, Maryland in 1830, Granville Perkins became a scene painter at the age of fifteen, working with the Ravel family on theatrical productions such as Mazulua, The Green Monster, and Jacko or the Brazilian Ape.

With the Ravels, Perkins traveled to Cuba, Jamaica, the Yucatan Peninsula, and Central America between 1851 and 1856. The paintings he based on these travels give evidence of his passion for tropical subjects. In 1856 he exhibited a painting based on his travels, Cape Croix, Cuba, at the Pennsylvania Academy of the Fine Arts.

Perkins studied art with the marine painter James Hamilton at the Pennsylvania Academy of the Fine Arts in Philadelphia. By 1860 he moved to New York City, where he would work as an illustrator for periodicals such as Harper's Weekly and Frank Leslie's Illustrated Newspaper.

Perkins' illustrations appeared in a variety of books including Henry Wadsworth Longfellow's The Courtship of Miles Standish and Evangeline: A Tale of Acadie. Four of his landscape drawings were engraved for the elegant gift book Picturesque America, edited by William Cullen Bryant. Three drawings of New Hampshire landscapes were engraved for Drake and Gibson's book The Heart of the White Mountains.

In New York, Perkins exhibited paintings at the National Academy of Design between 1862 and 1883. In 1870, he again sought tropical subjects for his brush, this time traveling from New York to California and from there by ship around Cape Horn. A member of the New York Watercolor Society, some of Perkins' paintings from this trip were watercolors, including Donner Pass and Storm in the Sierras, 1882. Perkins' paintings of the 1870s and 1880s often featured South American landscapes.

Granville Perkins died in New York City in 1895.

== Gallery ==
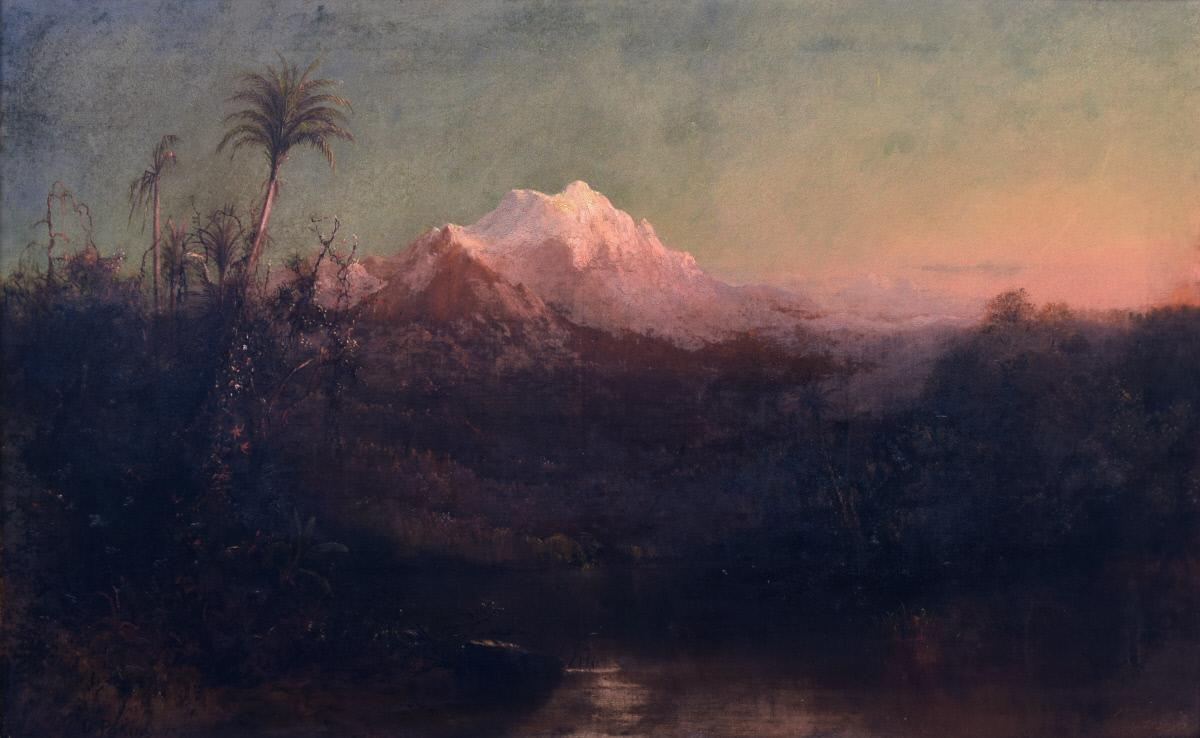
Landscape, 1867

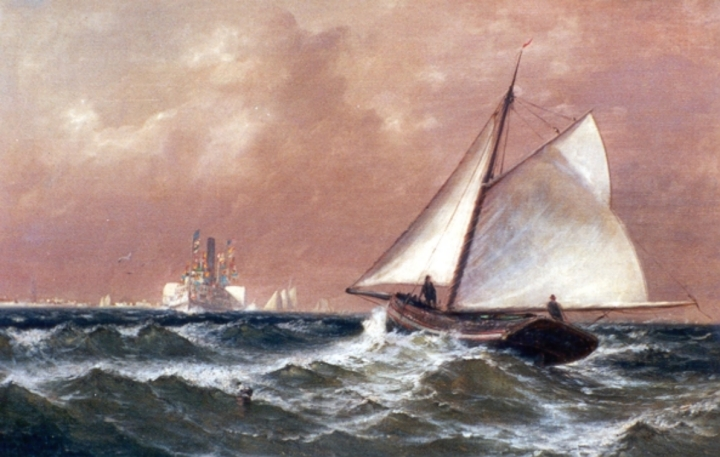
Mary Ann off Keyport, New Jersey, circa 1880

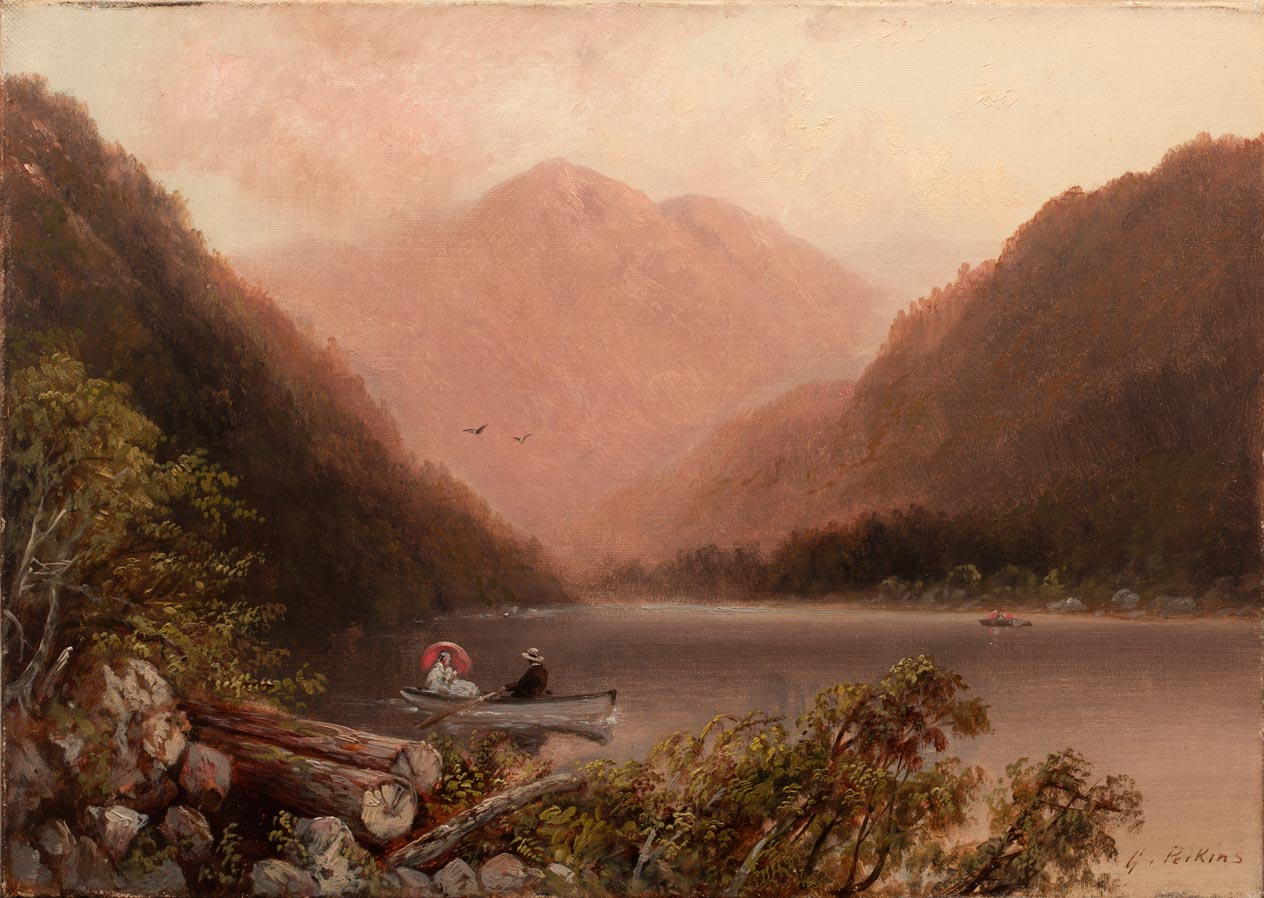
View of a Mountain Lake, circa 1870

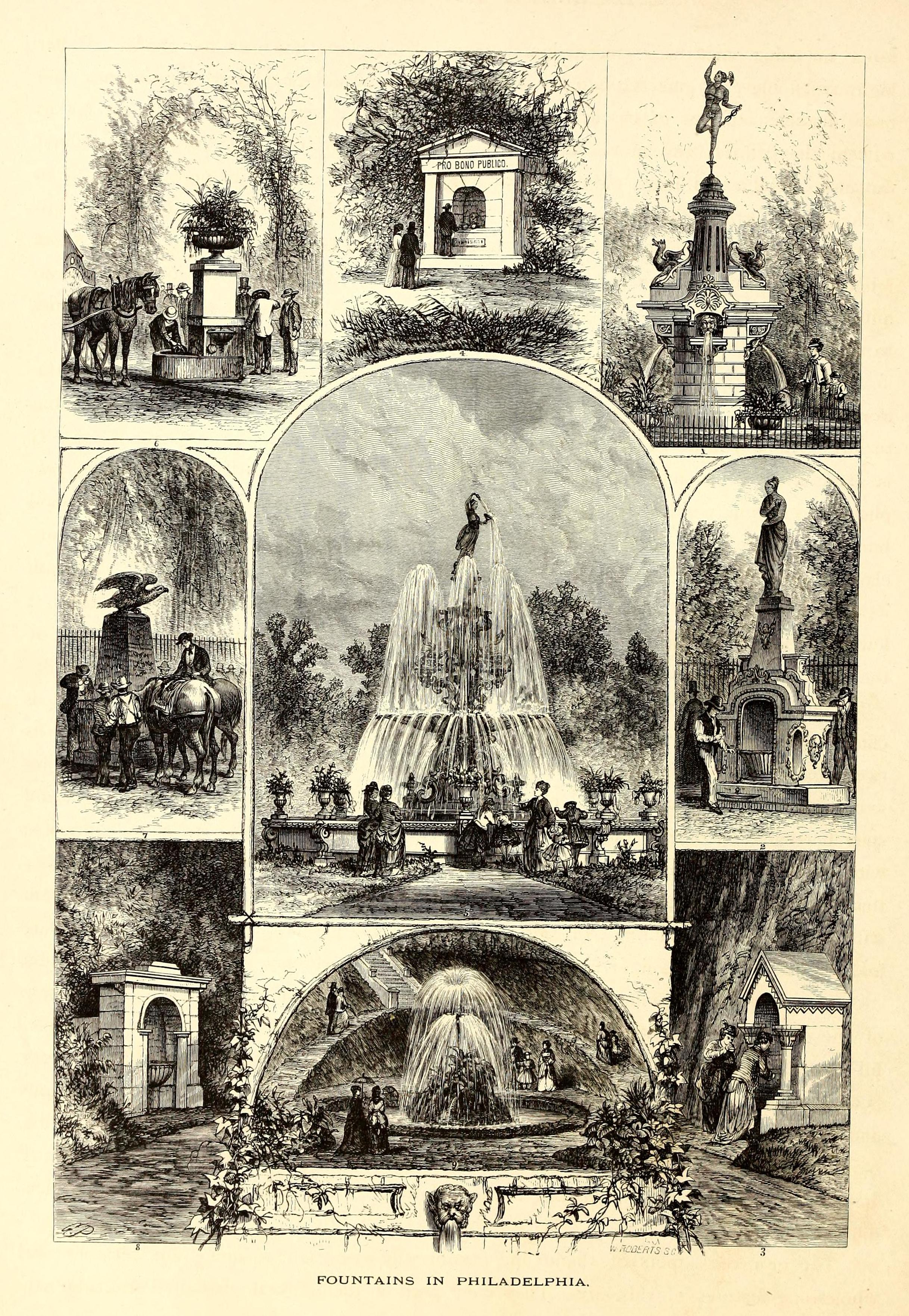
Fountains in Philadelphia, 1874

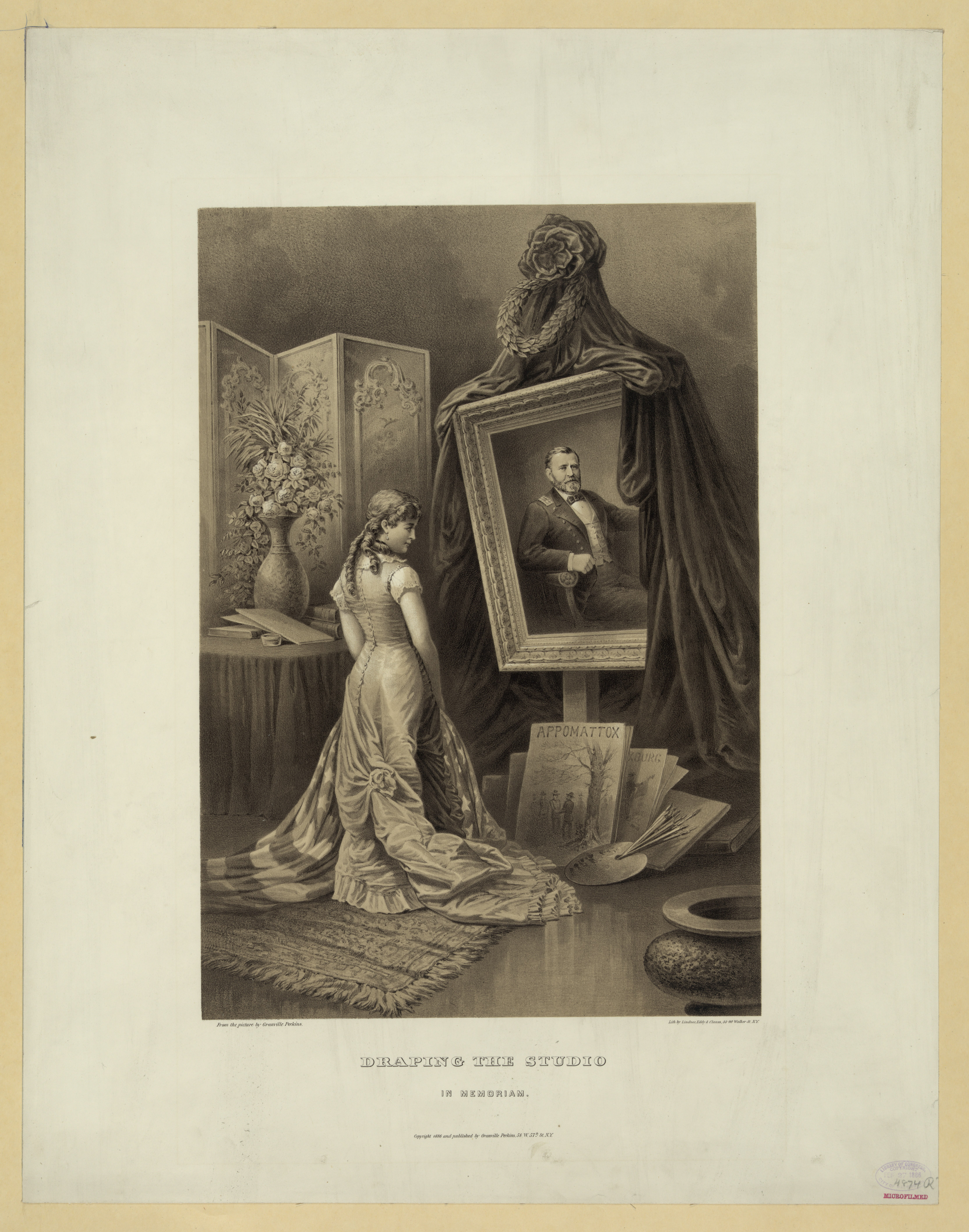
Draping the Studio in Memoriam, 1886

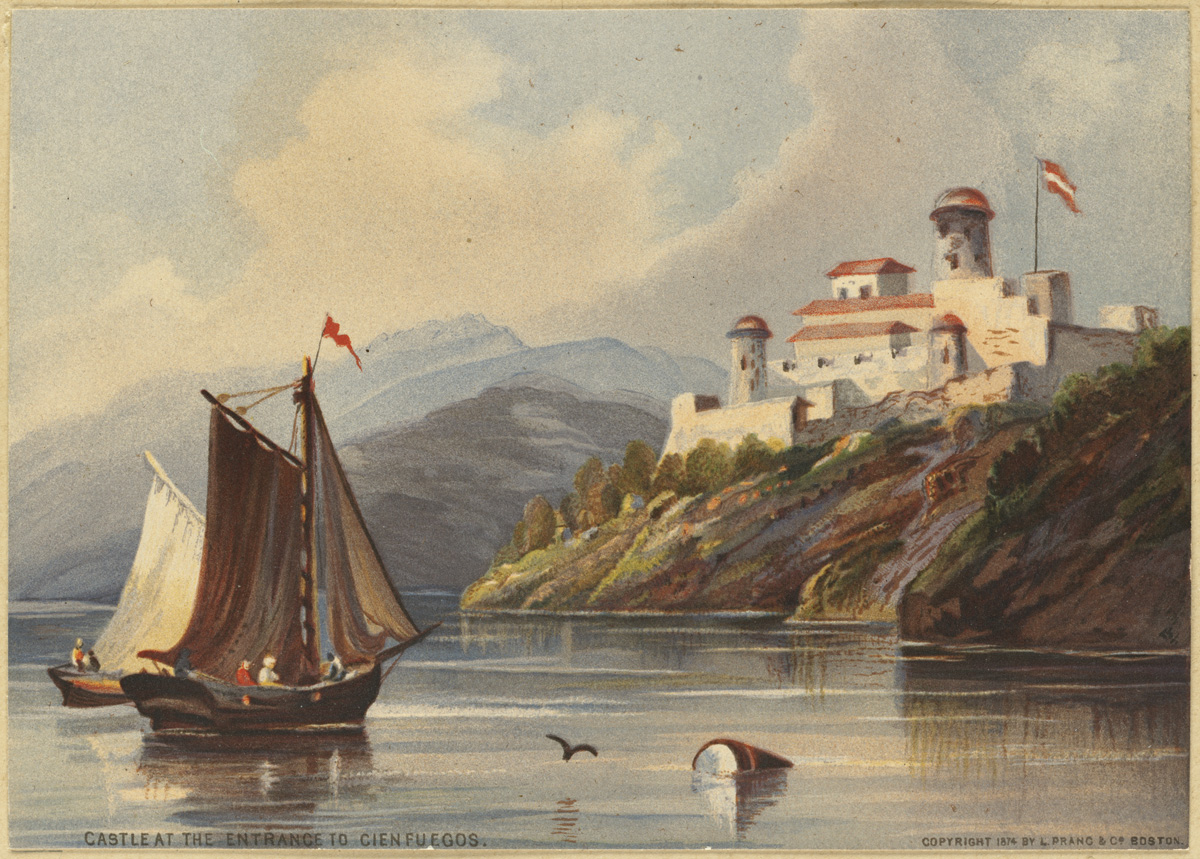
"Castle at the Entrance to Cienfuegos" (Castillo de Jagua), painting of 1855, "Six Cuban Views", by Granville Perkins. Boston Public Library.
