= Nicasio Álvarez de Cienfuegos =

Spanish poet and publicist (1764–1809)

The Most Excellent Nicasio Álvarez de Cienfuegos
- Born: 14 December 1764; Madrid, Spain
- Died: 30 June 1809 (aged 44); Orthez, France

Seat U of the Real Academia Española
- In office 1 January 1801 – 30 June 1809
- Preceded by: Juan de Sahagún de la Mata
- Succeeded by: Lorenzo de Carvajal

Nicasio Álvarez de Cienfuegos (14 December 1764 – 30 June 1809) was a Spanish poet and publicist.

He was born in Madrid, and studied with distinction at Salamanca, where he met the poet Melendez Valdés. His poems, published in 1798, immediately attracted attention. He was editor of the Gaceta and Mercurio, and was condemned to death for having published an article against Napoleon; on the petition of his friends, he was spared and deported to France in 1808; he died in Orthez the following year.

His verses are modeled on those of Melendez Valdés; they are distinguished by the sentimentality and philosophy of the time period. Cienfuegos was blamed for a use of both archaisms and gallicisms. His plays, Pítaco, Zoraida, La Condesa de Castilla and Idomeneo, four tragedies on the pseudo-classic French model, and Las Hermanas generosas, a comedy, are lesser-known works today.
