= Matun, Cuba =

Matun
- Village
- Location of Matun in Cuba
- Coordinates: 22°10′28″N 80°42′48″W
- Country: Cuba
- Province: Cienfuegos
- Municipality: Abreus
- Elevation: 11 m (36 ft)
- Time zone: UTC-5 (EST)
- Area code: +53-432

Matun is a Cuban village in Cienfuegos Province. It is part of the municipality of Abreus.

== Geography ==
The little village is located in south of the municipality, near Yaguaramas and the borders with Zapata Swamp, in the Province of Matanzas.

== See also ==
- Juraguá
