= Juragua Nuclear Power Plant =

Cancelled nuclear power plant in Cuba

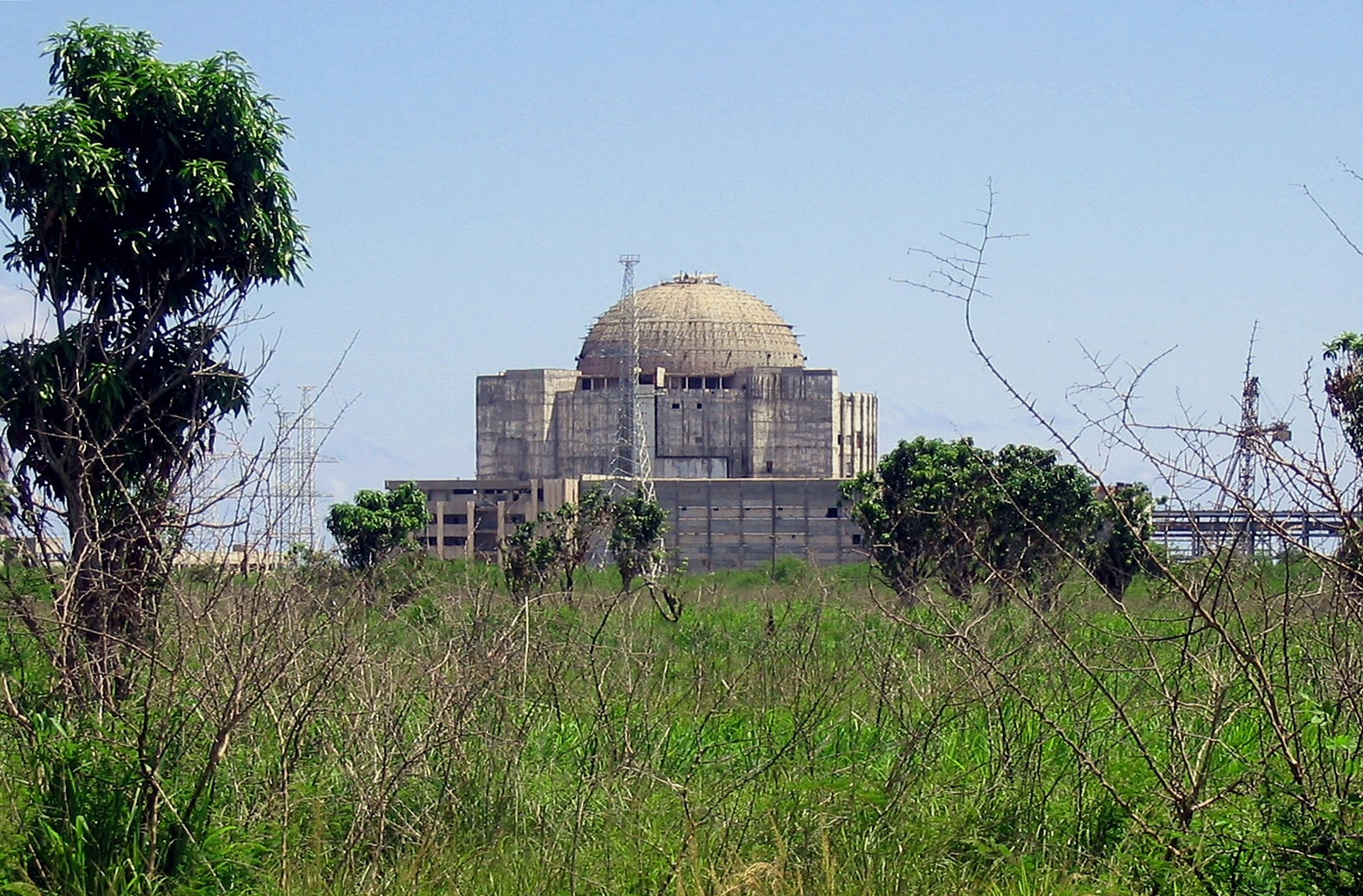
- The first reactor building as seen from a nearby road in 2006.
- Official name: Central Electronuclear de Juraguá (in Spanish)
- Country: Cuba
- Location: Cienfuegos
- Coordinates: 22°04′00.84″N 80°30′33.12″W
- Status: Cancelled construction, abandoned
- Construction began: 1983
- Decommission date: 1992

Nuclear power station
- Reactor type: VVER-440 V318
- Reactor supplier: Atomstroyexport

Power generation
- Units cancelled: 2 × 440 MWe
- Nameplate capacity: 880 MW

External links
- Commons: Related media on Commons

Juragua Nuclear Power Plant was a nuclear power plant under construction in Cuba when a suspension of construction was announced in 1992 following the collapse of the Soviet Union and the termination of Soviet economic aid to Cuba. Russia and Cuba sought third-country financing to complete the plant in the mid-1990s but in 2000 the two countries agreed to abandon the project.

A workers' town, Ciudad Nuclear, was built next to the plant and is inhabited today with many buildings left in a half-finished state.

== Background ==
Cuba's interest in civil use of nuclear energy dated back to 1956, when Cuba/United States signed an "Agreement for co-operation concerning civil uses of atomic energy". This agreement suggested the possibility of further cooperation extending to the design, construction, and operation of power producing nuclear reactors. The agreement was reached during Fulgencio Batista's regime, later overthrown as a result of the Cuban Revolution in 1959. The treaty was ultimately terminated during the Cuban Missile Crisis in October 1962.

Russian-Cuban cooperation in nuclear energy dated back to January 1967, when the Soviet Union sponsored a photo exposition, "Atomic Energy for Peaceful Purposes", at the Cuban Academy of Sciences. Nine months later both countries reached an agreement to provide Cuba with a research reactor for experimental and teaching purposes, as well as assistance in assembling and operating the equipment. In 1975 Cuban and Russian officials signed treaties for "Cooperation in the Peaceful Uses of Nuclear Energy" and the "Establishment of Direct Scientific-Technical Co-operation in the Field of the Uses of Nuclear Energy".

In 1976 Cuba and the Soviet Union signed an agreement to construct two 440-megawatt nuclear power reactors (VVER-440 V318) in the south central province of Cienfuegos, near the village of Juraguá. The original plan called for 12 reactors, four each at Juraguá, Puerto Esperanza in the western part of the island, and Holguín, in the east. The project was ultimately reduced to two 440-megawatt nuclear power reactors, both at Juraguá. Upon completion, the first reactor would have generated over 15% of Cuba's energy demands. The construction of these reactors was a priority for Cuba because of its dependence on imported oil.

== Design ==
The Juragua plant included two VVER-440 V318 nuclear power reactors, the first Soviet-designed reactors to be built in the Western Hemisphere and in a tropical environment. The VVER are pressurized water reactors (PWR) developed by the Soviet Union. The number 440 indicated the electric power in MWe of the reactor, which employed two turbines of 220 MWe each with an overall thermal power of 1,375 MWth for the reactor. The V318 model was the newest 440 MWe Soviet-model and it was based on V213, an improvement in safety standards over the older V230 reactors, which lacked an Emergency Core Cooling System (ECCS). The Cuban model (V318) was also designed to have full containment with a steel-lined concrete dome structure to inhibit the release of radioactive particles in the event of a severe accident.

== Construction ==
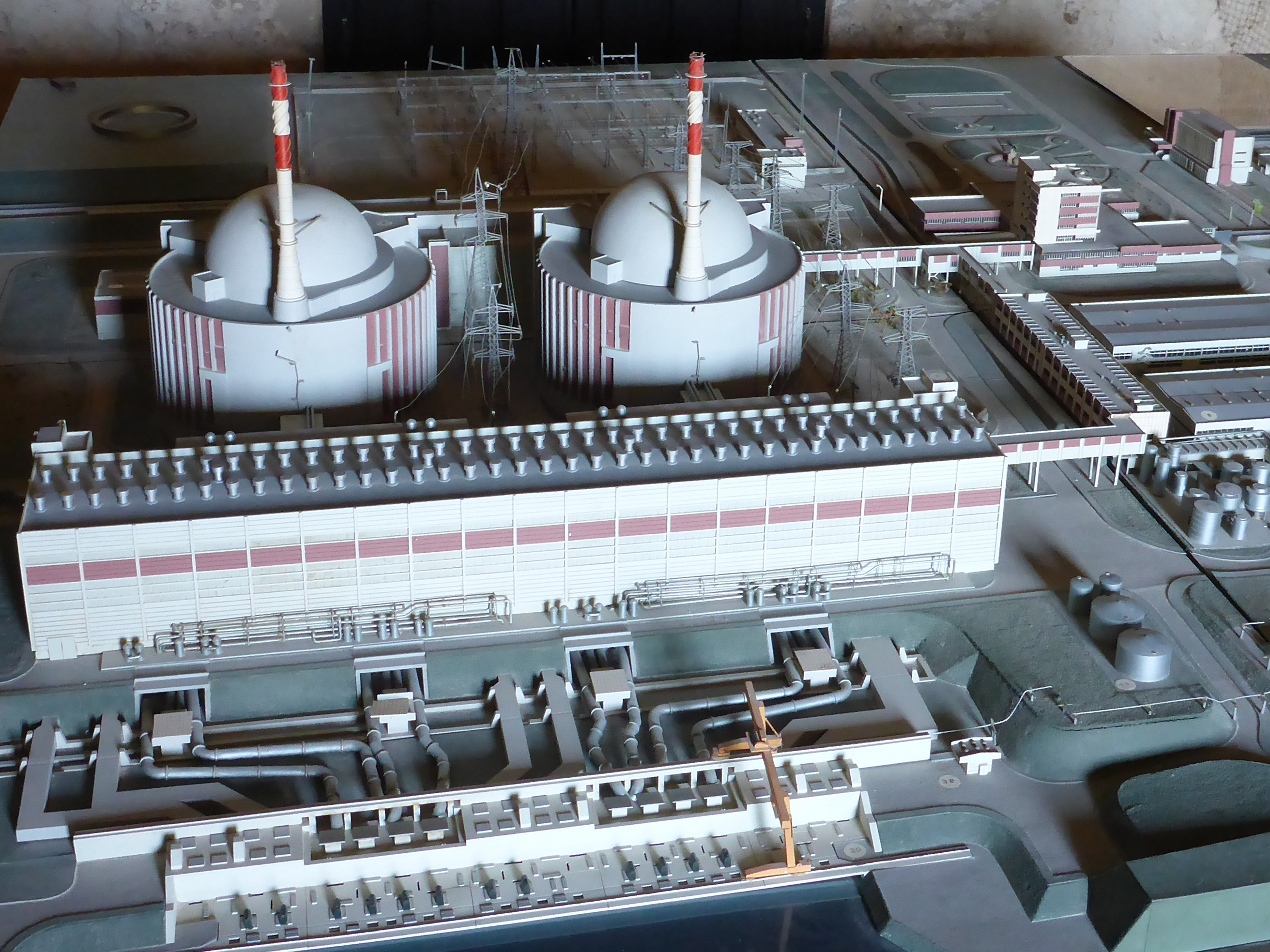
Architectural model, on display at neighbouring fortress Castillo de Jagua (2016)

Under the supervision of Fidel Castro Díaz-Balart, the construction of the first reactor began in 1983 and the second in 1985. Most of the reactor parts, except for civil construction materials, were supplied by the Soviet Union under bilateral economic cooperation agreements. The first reactor was initially scheduled to be operational in 1993 by Cuban officials, but it was later estimated that the reactor would not be operational until late 1995 or early 1996. However, the collapse of the Soviet Union disrupted construction at Juragua, as a market economy established new economic ties and Russia began providing technical assistance to Cuba on a commercial basis. The plant was being built with the help of some Russian technicians and some of them were withdrawn after the dissolution of the Soviet Union.

At the behest of the Russian Federation, Cuba negotiated with European firms such as Siemens, Cegelec and Skoda to provide Instrumentation and Control equipment to upgrade the safety standards of the plant. In the 1970s Russia had successfully constructed Loviisa Nuclear Power Plant in Finland through a joint venture with Siemens to comply with Finnish nuclear regulations. In 1992 Siemens visited the Juragua plant and agreed to install the systems but Russia was unable to pay in hard currency as demanded. Cuba was also incapable of delivering the $21 million payment that Siemens was asking for. On September 5, 1992, Cuban President Fidel Castro announced a suspension of construction at Juragua due to Cuba's inability to meet the financial terms set by Russia to complete the reactors. Castro stated that more than 1.1 billion dollars had been invested.

A September 1992 GAO report estimated that civil construction on the first reactor ranged from 90 to 97% complete with only 37% of the reactor equipment installed, while the second reactor was only between 20 and 30% completed. The primary components had not been installed and the nuclear fuel was not delivered. Russian press reported that at least one reactor, without nuclear fuel, and its steam turbine set were delivered to Cuba.

=== Allegations of problems and defects ===
United States opposition to the project had existed since the 1980s, but upon Soviet Union's withdrawal, concerns over Cuba's ability to safely operate the plant surfaced. In the eventuality of a nuclear accident, radioactive fallout from an accident could reach United States territory on the third day after an accident. United States president Bill Clinton stated in April 1993 that the United States opposed the construction of the plant because of safety concerns and Cuba's refusal to sign the Nuclear Non-Proliferation Treaty or ratify the Treaty of Tlatelolco. Some media referred to the plant as a potential "Cuban Chernobyl" and Ileana Ros-Lehtinen, a United States Representative from Florida and born in La Havana, described the plant as "a potential Chernobyl in our own backyard". Cuba also met with criticism related to the inadequate storage of deteriorating mechanical equipment.

In a September 1992 report to Congress, Cuban nuclear plant workers who defected to the United States stated that the nuclear facility presented problems that could affect the safe operation of the reactors and their construction. According to these workers, the Cuban technicians did not have a good system to check the reactor's components provided by the Soviet Union. A former Cuban technician, responsible for checking the welds in the civil construction, claimed that from about 5,000 weld sites that had passed inspection, 10 to 15 percent were defective. According to another worker, individuals trained to be reactor operators received five months of instruction from the Russians on a simulator that did not resemble the reactor under construction in Cuba.

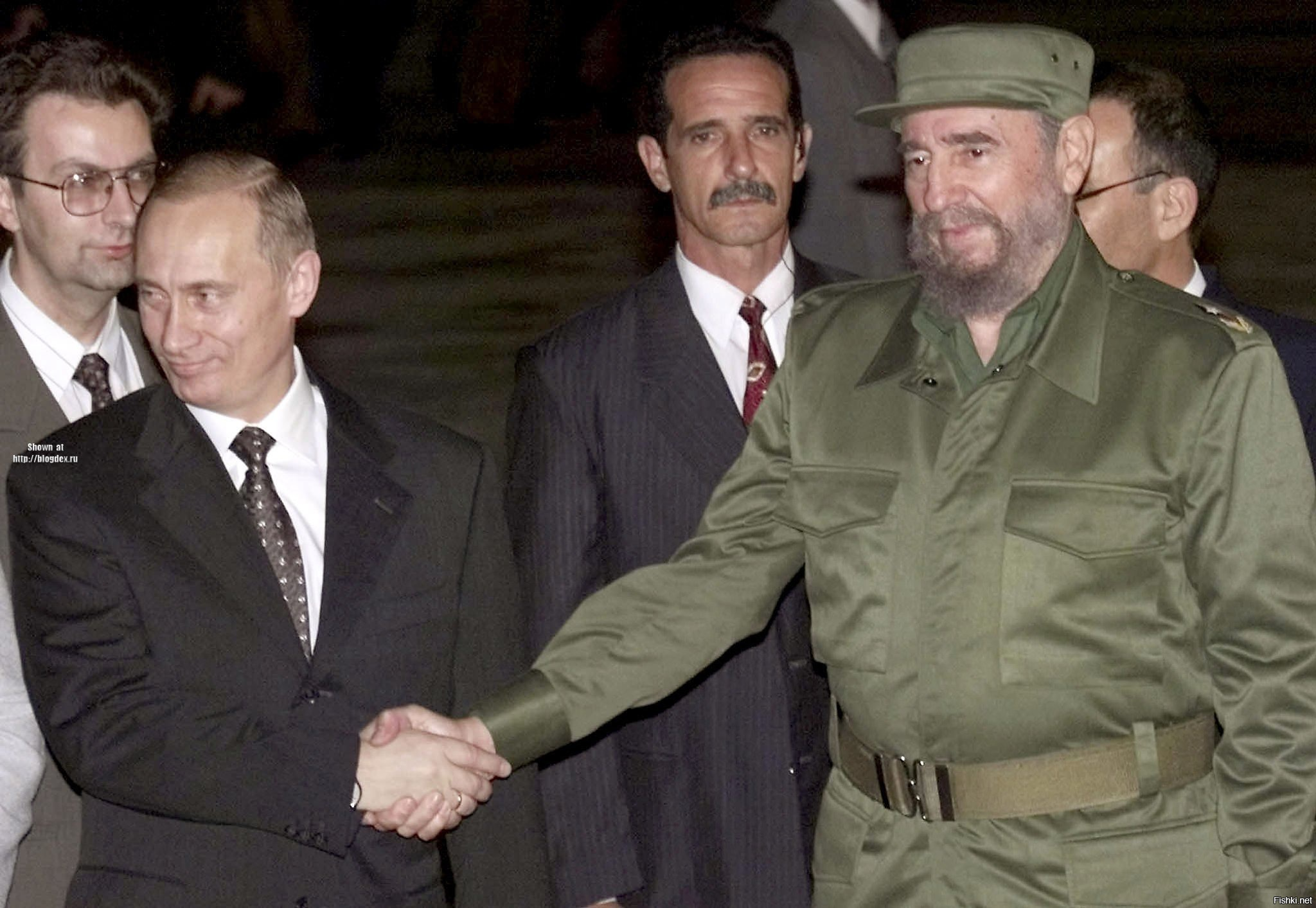
Russian President Vladimir Putin and Cuban leader Fidel Castro agreed to abandon the project after Putin's visit to Havana in December 2000.

=== Attempts to resume construction ===
In 1995, the Russian Ministry of Atomic Energy announced that it intended to resume the construction of Cuba's reactors in 1998 with financing provided by an international consortium involving Siemens, Ansaldo and Électricité de France. However, the aforementioned companies dismissed the claims and it was reported that the announcement could have been part of a political stance against United States threat to cut aid to Russia. The United States opposition on the project discouraged other countries following the Helms–Burton Act, which continued and strengthened the United States embargo against Cuba. Estimates regarding the cost to finish the reactor ranged from $300 million to $750 million. In 1997, Fidel Castro announced that Cuba was no longer interested in finishing the plant and would be seeking other energy alternatives. In December 2000, Russian President Vladimir Putin visited Cuba and offered to complete one reactor by investing 800 million dollars over six years. Castro subsequently announced that Cuba was no longer interested in completing the twin 440-megawatt reactor plant. This announcement was made amid the failed attempt to resolve the problem of Cuba's debt to the former Soviet Union, inherited by Russia.

In 2004, the main turbine at the Juragua plant was removed to replace a damaged turbine at Guiteras thermoelectric plant.

== Gallery ==
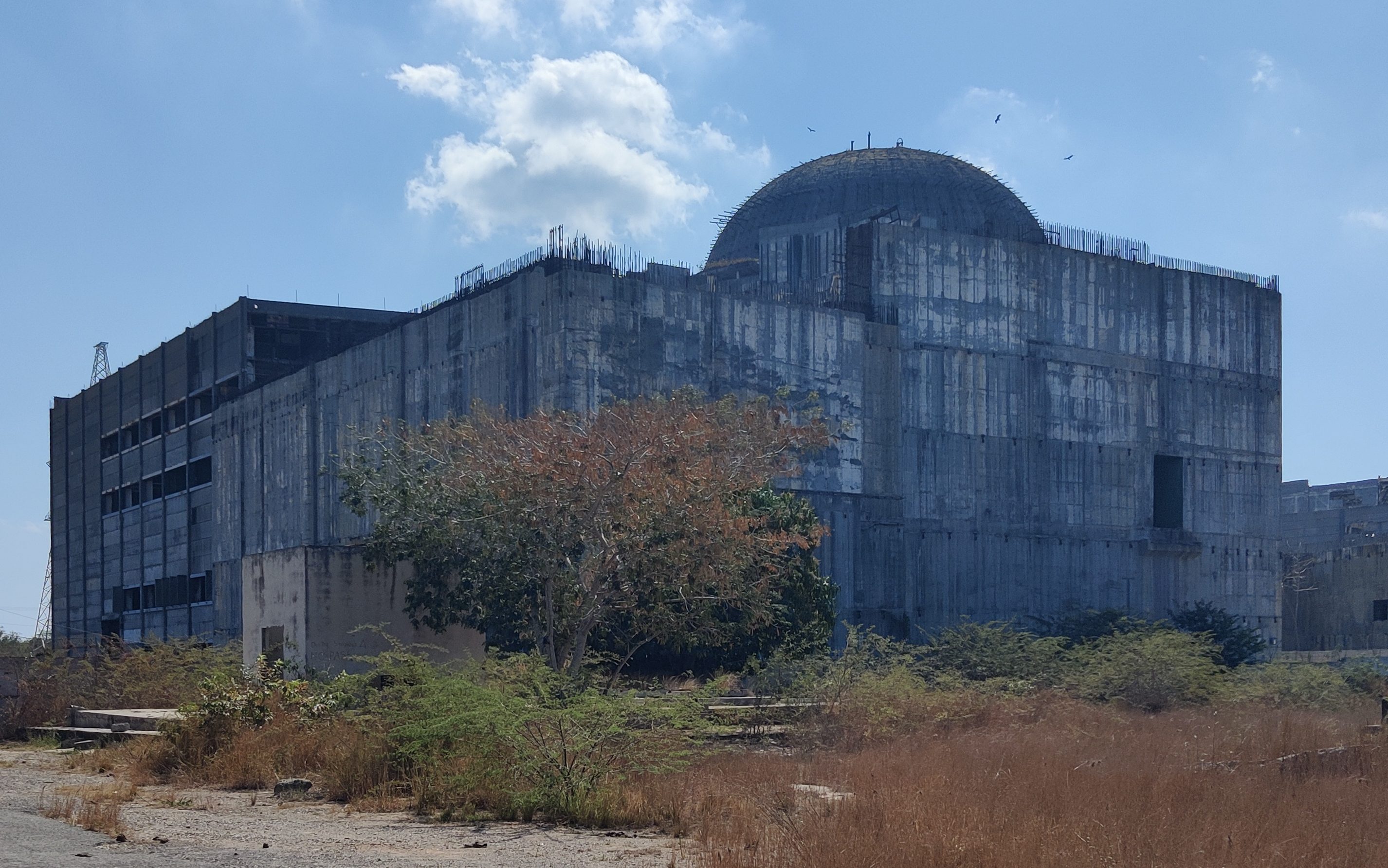
Power plant building in 2023

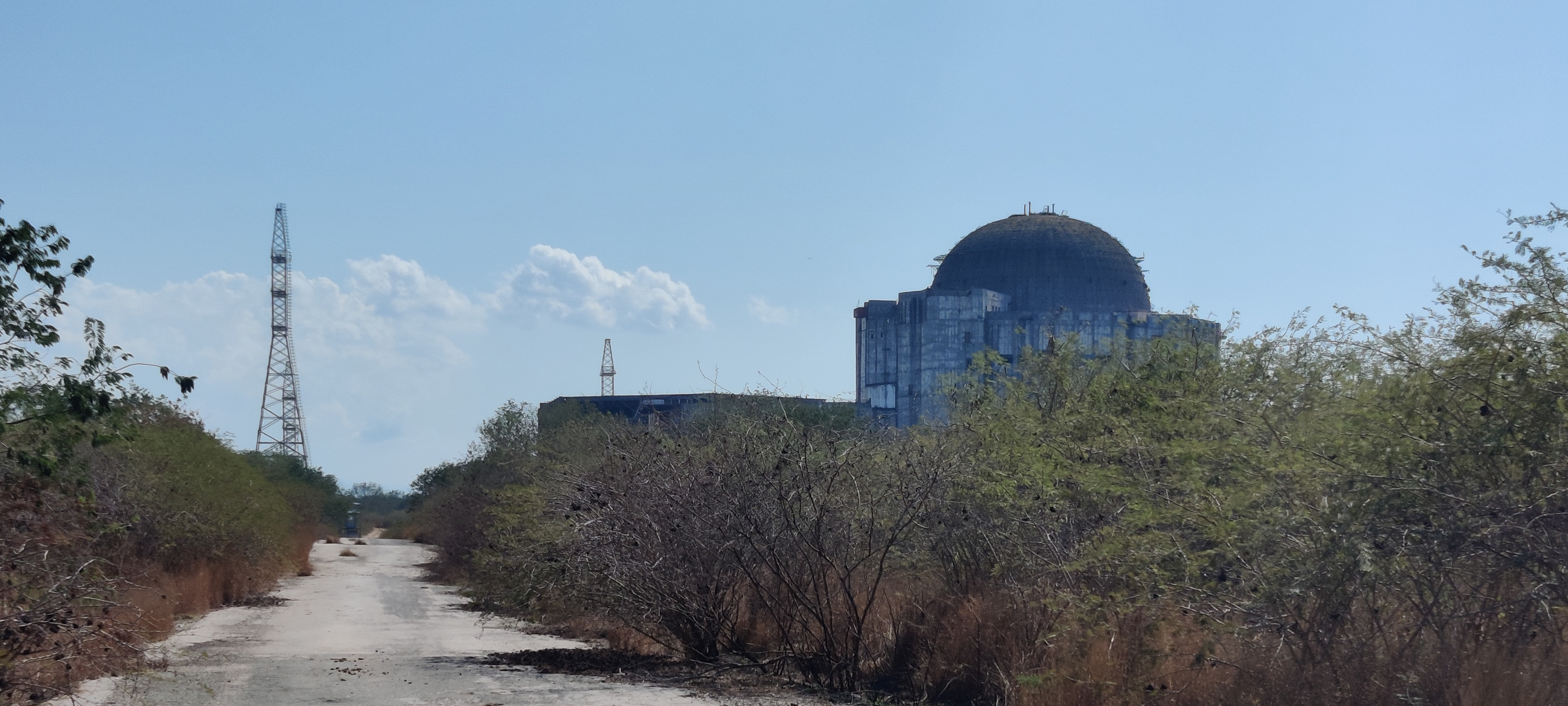
Access road to the power plant (2023)

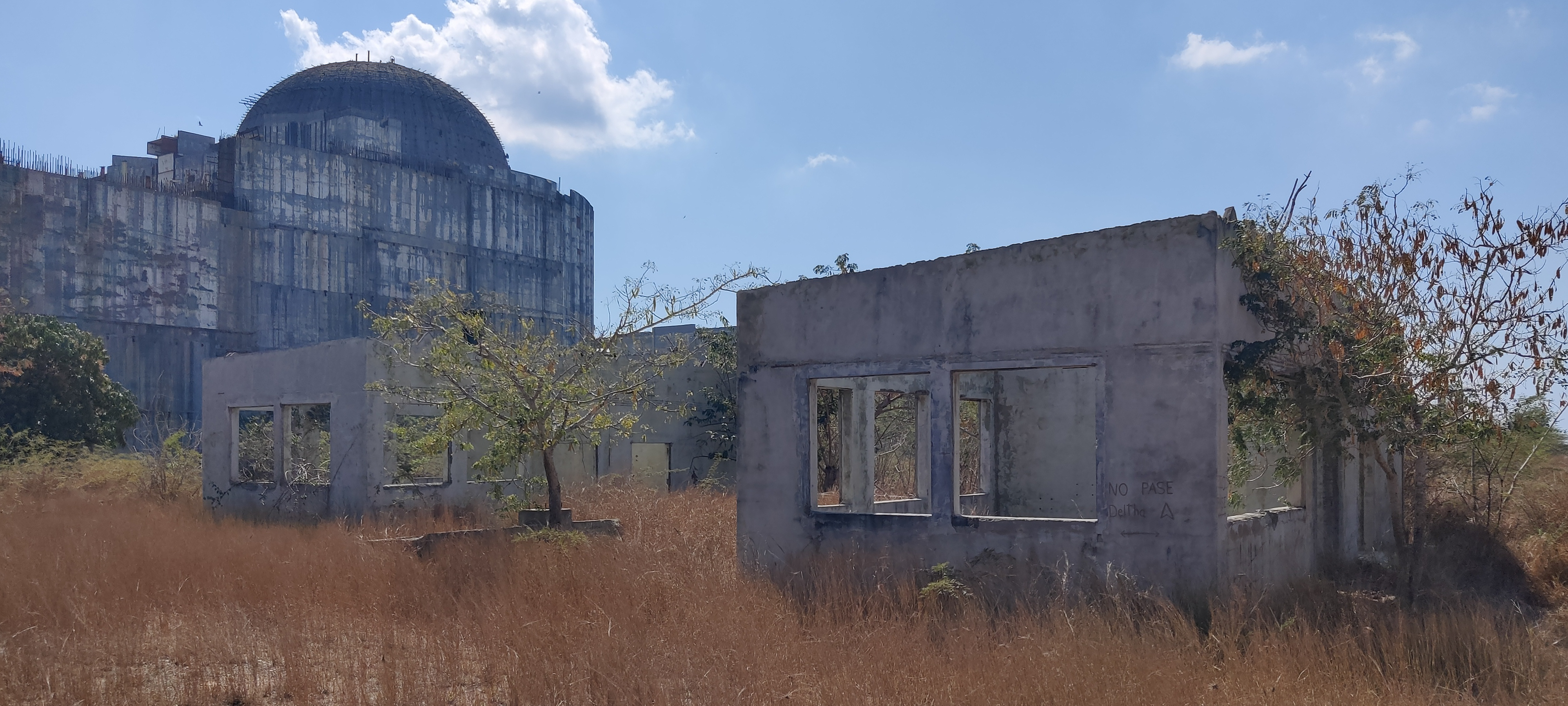
Abandoned buildings around the power plant (2023)

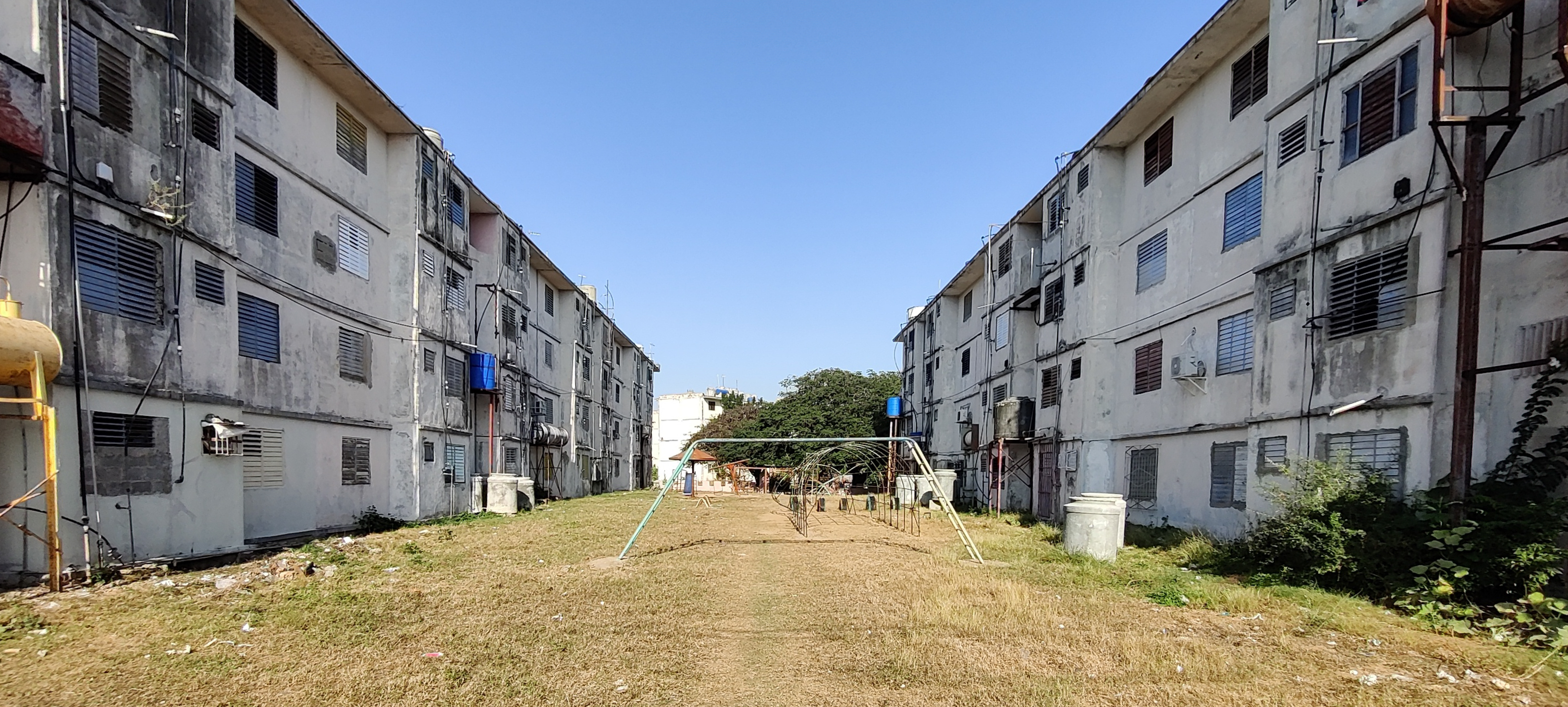
Ciudad Nuclear in 2023

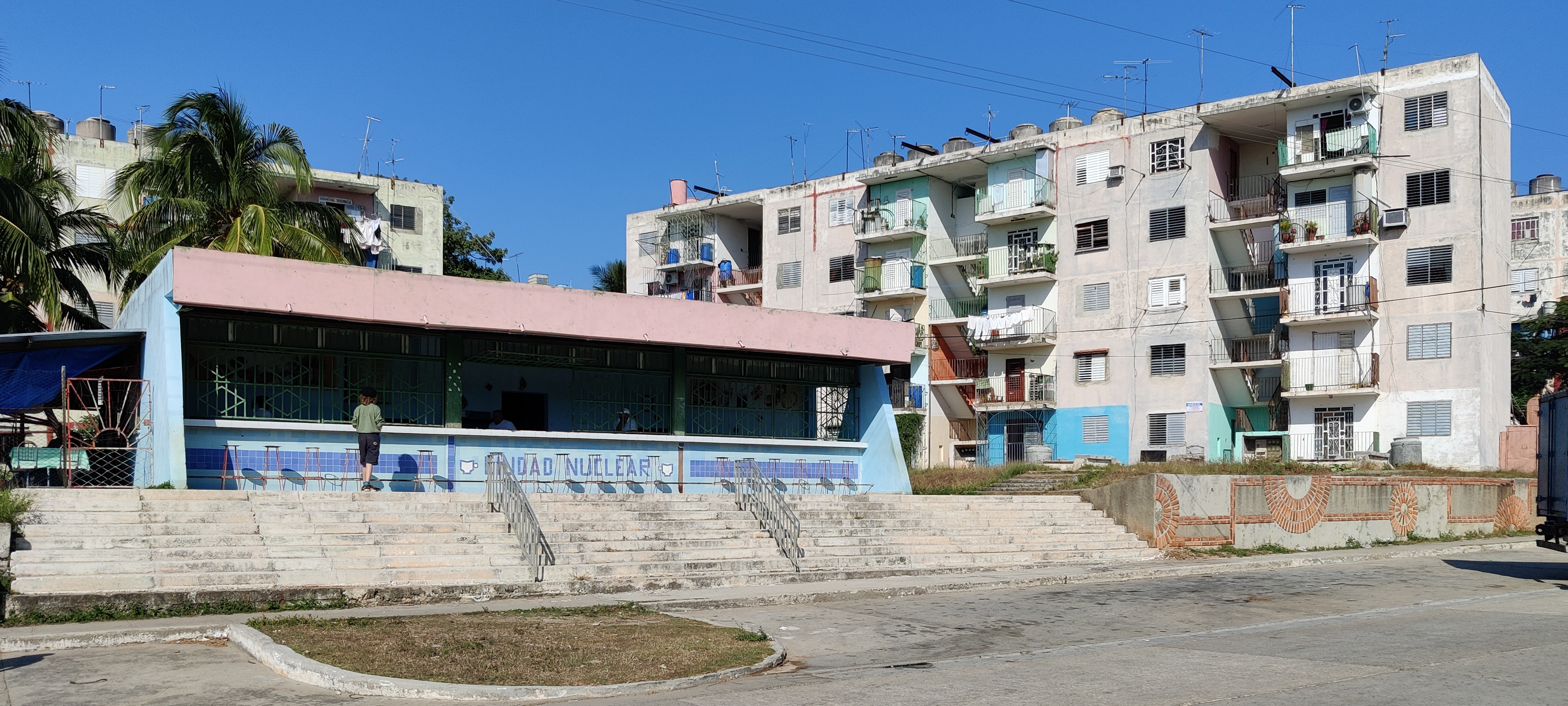
Ciudad Nuclear in 2023

== See also ==
- Treaty of Tlatelolco
