= Cienfuegos Bay =

Bay on the southern coast of Cuba

- Jagua Bay (Bahía de Jagua)
- Bahía de Cienfuegos (Spanish)
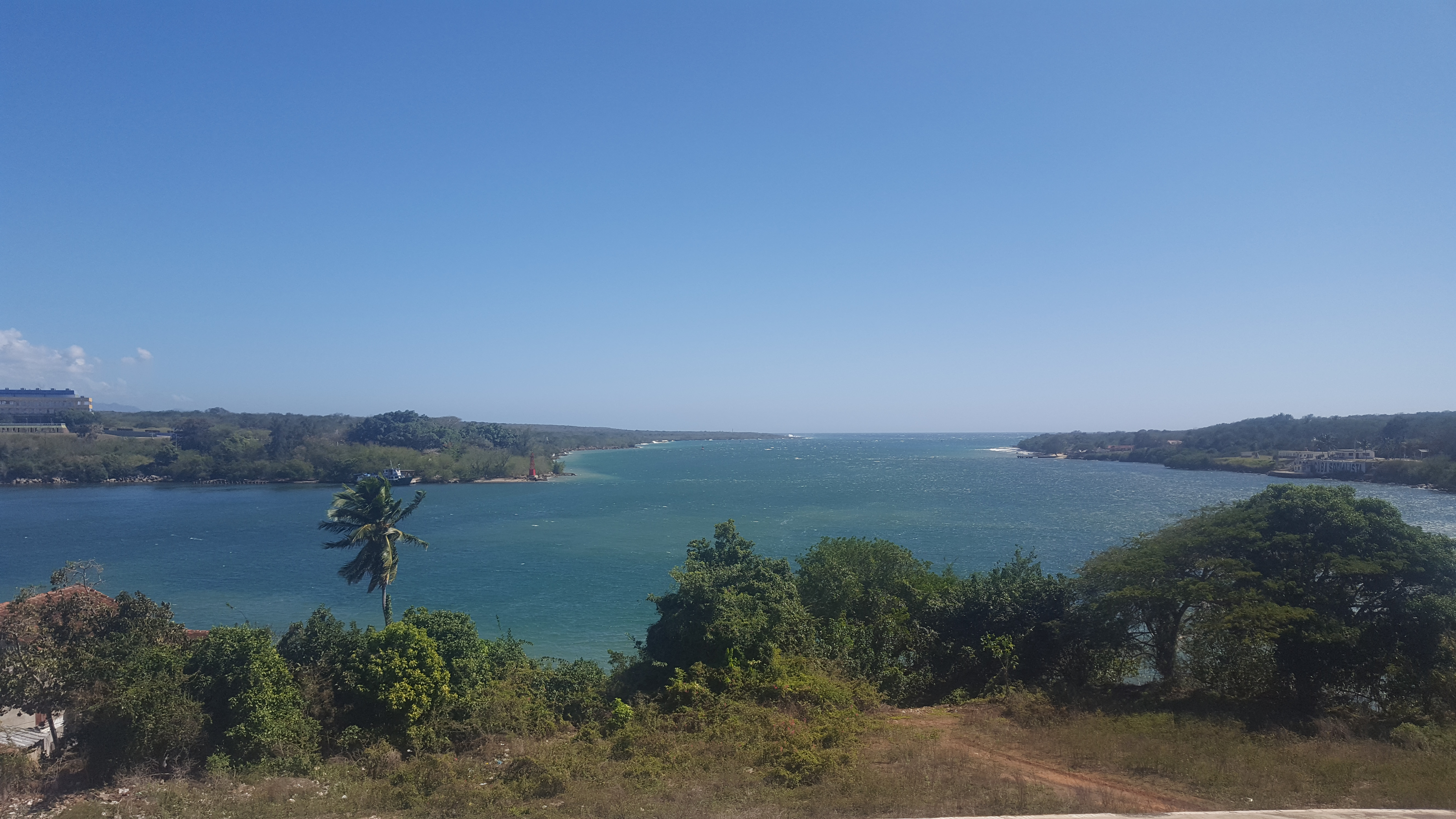
- Cienfuegos Bay as seen from Jagua Fortress

- Location in Cuba
- Coordinates: 22°08′02″N 80°28′51″W
- Ocean/sea sources: Caribbean Sea
- Basin countries: Cuba
- Max. length: 22 kilometres (14 mi)
- Max. width: 13 kilometres (8.1 mi)
- Surface area: 88.46 square kilometres (34.15 mi^{2})
- Settlements: Cienfuegos, Cuba; Jagua

Cienfuegos Bay (Spanish: Bahía de Cienfuegos) is a bay in the Caribbean Sea located in Cienfuegos Province on the southern coast of Cuba. It has served as a harbor for boats for many years. It has two of the most important ports in the country, one of which is the city of Cienfuegos, the capital of the province.

== History ==
On his second voyage to the Americas, Christopher Columbus visited the bay in 1494. The first permanent settlements occurred in 1738. The Jagua Fortress was erected by King Philip V of Spain in 1742 to protect the bay from pirates who prowled the Caribbean coast in those days. They used it as a refuge at landfall, on their way to the city of Cienfuegos.
