= Jardín Botánico de Cienfuegos =

Botanical gardens in Cienfuegos, Cuba

- Jardín Botánico Soledad
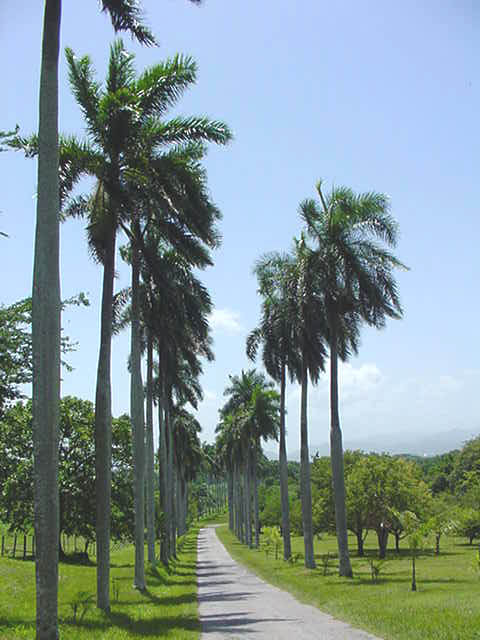
- Cuban Royal Palms across the entry road to the Gardens
- Interactive map of Jardín Botánico de Cienfuegos
- Type: Botanical gardens
- Location: Cienfuegos Province, Cuba
- Nearest city: Cienfuegos
- Coordinates: 22°07′N 80°20′W
- Area: 97 hectares (240 acres)
- Created: 1901; 125 years ago
- Founder: Edwin F. and Katherine W. Atkins

Cienfuegos Province Botanical Garden, officially, Jardín Botánico de Cienfuegos, also known as Jardín Botánico Soledad, is located 14 kilometres (8.7 mi) from Cienfuegos city centre.

== Overview ==
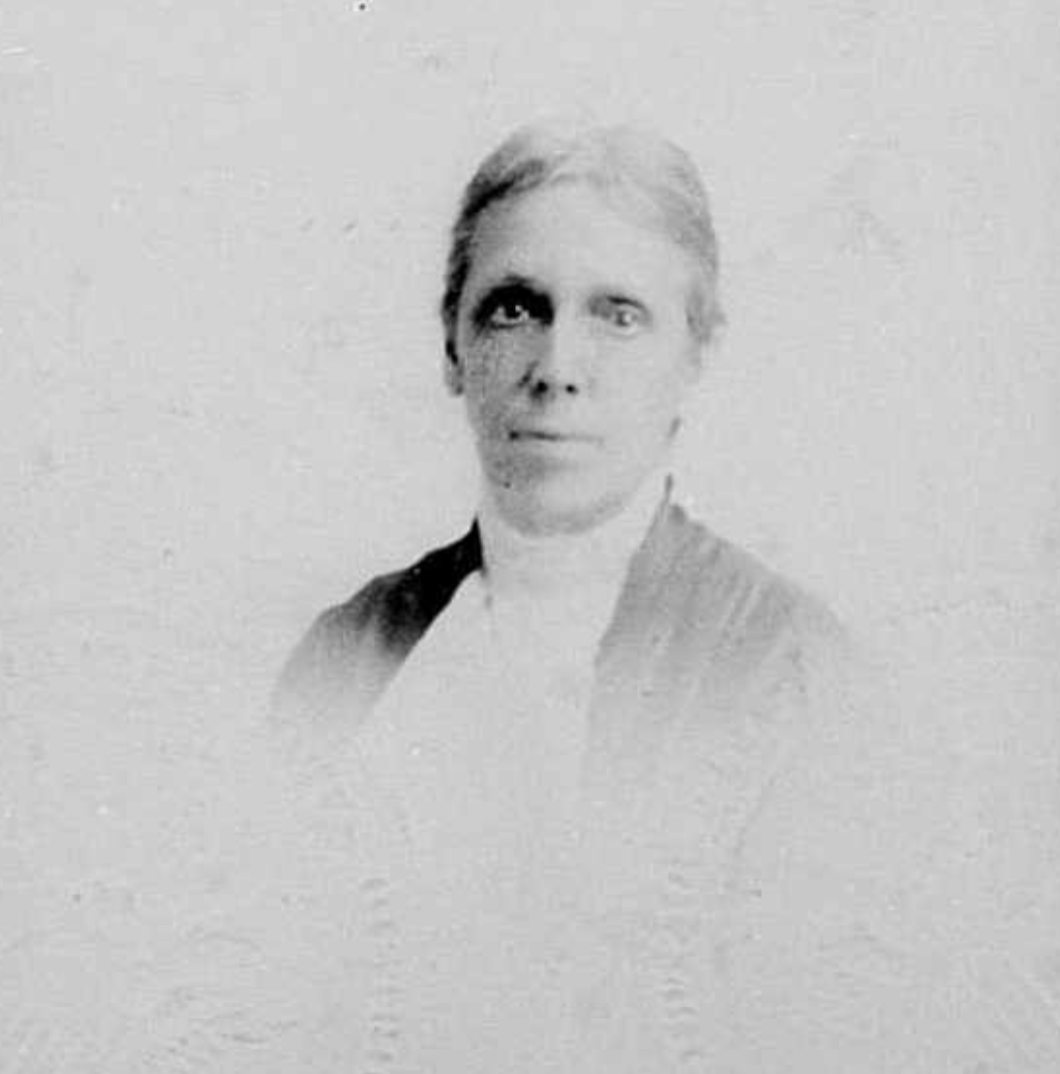
Garden co-founder Katherine Wrisley Atkins

With 97 hectares (240 acres) it is one of the oldest institution botanic gardens on the island. The garden was founded in 1901 by Edwin F. Atkins and his wife, Katherine Wrisley Atkins. They arrived in Cuba in 1899 in search of the island's most precious commodity: sugarcane.

Atkins built the Soledad sugar mill, and, soon after, a research center dedicated to investigation and enhancement of sugar cane under the name Harvard Botanical Station for Tropical Research and Sugar Cane Investigation

The sugar entrepreneur Edwin F. Atkins and the Harvard botanists George L. Goodale, Oakes Ames and Thomas Barbour founded the Harvard Botanical Garden and Sugar Cane Experimental Station in Cuba in 1899. Atkins financed the work of the Harvard botanists who developed a cane variety resistant to disease. The Harvard botanists turned the Garden into a tropical laboratory wherein they planted trees from across the world.

Mr. and Mrs. Atkins were also fond of plant collecting and soon afterwards started a tropical and rare species garden in the backyard of their estate where plants from as far as India and China were grown in tropical Cuba.

Graduate students in Harvard in 1940 were expected to gain some experience in tropical biology by visiting the Harvard botanical garden in Cuba ... It was near Central Soledad and was then called the Atkins Institution of the Arnold Arboretum. ... The administrative officers of the Garden were in Cambridge—Elmer D. Merrill, director of the Arnold Arboretum, for botany and Thomas Barbour, director of the Museum of Comparative Zoology, for zoology.

Today the garden has a large collection of tropical exotic plants (2000+ species) clustered in 670 genera and 125 botanical families. Among the most complete collections are orchids (400+), palms (230+), ficuses (65+) and bamboos (29).
