= 8th Central Committee of the Communist Party of Cuba =

Government body elected in 2021

The 8th Central Committee of the Communist Party of Cuba (CPC) was elected at the 8th CPC Congress on 19 April 2021.

== Plenums ==
The Central Committee is not a permanent institution. It convenes plenary sessions between party congresses, and in this case between the 8th Congress and the 9th Congress. When the CC is not in session, decision-making power was vested in the internal bodies of the CC itself; that is, the Politburo and the Secretariat. None of these bodies are permanent either; typically they convened several times a month.

Plenary sessions of the Central Committee
Plenum	Date	Length	Meeting agenda
1st Plenary Session	19 April 2021	1 day	1 item.: 1. Election of First Secretary and Central Bodies; 1. Election of the First Secretary of the Central Committee; 1. Miguel Díaz-Canel elected.; 2. Election of the 8th Politburo; 1. Election of Miguel Díaz-Canel, Juan Esteban Lazo Hernández, Salvador Antonio Valdés Mesa, Roberto Morales Ojeda, Álvaro López Miera, Bruno Eduardo Rodríguez Parrilla, Ulises Guilarte de Nacimiento, Marta Ayala Ávila, Manuel Marrero Cruz, Teresa María Amarelle Boué, José Amado Ricardo Guerra, Luis Alberto Rodríguez López-Calleja, Lázaro Alberto Álvarez Casas and Gladys Martínez Verdecia.; 3. Election of the 8th Secretariat; 1. Election of Roberto Morales Ojeda, Rogelio Polanco Fuentes, Joel Queipo Ruiz, José Ramón Monteagudo Ruiz, Félix Duarte Ortega and Jorge Luis Broche Lorenzo.
2nd Plenary Session	23–24 October 2021	2 days	
3rd Plenary Session	16–17 December 2021	2 days	
4th Plenary Session	26–27 April 2022	2 days	5 items.: 1. Presentation and Debate of the Report on the Work of the Politburo.; 2. Evaluation of the Implementation of the Cadre Policy Strategy for the period 2021–2026; 3. Evaluation of the Programme for the Transformation of Political Ideological Work; 4. Evaluation of the Process of Popular Consultation of the Family Code; 5. Evaluation of the Implementation of the Guidelines of the Economic and Social Policy of the Party and the Revolution approved at the 8th Congress; 1. Updating of the document.; 2. Anti-inflationary measures approved.; 3. Discussion on the system of attention to economic actors, both in the socialist state enterprise and in the non-state sector.
5th Plenary Session	9−10 December 2022	2 days	
6th Plenary Session	23 May 2023	1 day	
7th Plenary Session	14−15 December 2023	2 days	
8th Plenary Session	5−6 July 2024	2 days	
9th Plenary Session	12−13 December 2024	2 days	
10th Plenary Session	4−5 July 2025	2 days	
11th Plenary Session	13 December 2025	1 day	
Extraordinary Plenary Session	17 June 2026	1 day	

== Members ==
Name	Posts and level of government	7th CC	Gender
Homero Acosta Álvarez	National Assembly: Secretary of the Council of State; Secretary of the National Assembly of People's Power	Old	Male
Raúl Omar Acosta Gregorich	Armed Forces: Head of the Western Army of the Cuban Revolutionary Armed Forces	New	Male
Lázaro Alberto Álvarez Casas	Government: Minister of Interior	New	Male
Teresa María Amarelle Boué	Mass Organization Secretary-General of the Federation of Cuban Women	Old	Female
Aylin Álvarez García	Mass Organization Second Secretary of the National Committee of the Young Communist League	New	Female
Yudelkis Aretuche Torres	Provincial: Prosecutor of the Department of Family Protection and Juridirectional Affairs of the Matanzas Provincial Prosecutor's Office	New	Female
Mayra Arevich Marín	State-owned enterprise: Executive President of Empresa de Telecomunicaciones de Cuba S.A	Old	Female
Marta Ayala Ávila	Research Institution: General Director of the Center for Genetic Engineering and Biotechnology	Old	Female
Walter Baluja García	Research Institution: President of the University of Information Science	New	Male
Irene Barbado Lucio	State-owned Enterprise: Director of the Hermanos Díaz Oil Refinery	New	Female
Gladys María Bejerano Portela	Comptroller General: Comptroller General of the Republic	Old	Female
Yuri Belén Ramírez	Provincial: Official of the Artemisa Provincial Party Committee	New	Male
Aydiloide Bernal Villegas	Research Institution: Assistant Researcher at the Territorial Research Station of Sugar Cane in Ranchuelo, Villa Clara	New	Female
Meisi Bolaños Weiss	Government: Minister of Finance and Prices	New	Female
Juan Bravo Núñez	State-owned Enterprise: Director of the "Carlos Manuel de Céspedes" Thermoelectric Plant	New	Male
Yanays Bridón Contreras	State-owned Enterprise: Head of Rehabilitation Services at the "Guillermo Tejas" Polyclinic in Las Tunas	New	Female
Jorge Luis Broche Lorenzo	Central Party Apparatus: Head of the Education, Sports and Science Department of the Central Committee of the Communist Party of Cuba	Old	Male
Jesús Manuel Burón Tabit	Government: Vice Minister of the Interior	New	Male
Yanaisi Capó Nápoles	Provincial: Member of the Executive Bureau of the Granma Provincial Party Committee in charge of agriculture	New	Female
Inés María Chapman Waugh	Government: Vice Prime Minister of the Republic	Old	Female
Alianna Corona Rodríguez	Research Institution: Professor at the University of Granma	New	Female
Yuniasky Crespo Baquero	Provincial: Member of the Executive Bureau of the Havana Provincial Party Committee in charge of ideological work	Old	Female
Tania Margarita Cruz Hernández	Government: Vice Minister of Public Health	New	Female
Bolivia Tamara Cruz Martínez	Mass Organization: President of the Union of Journalists of Cuba in Villa Clara	Old	Female
Yanina de la Nuez Aclich	Provincial: First Secretary of the Mayabeque Provincial Party Committee	Old	Female
Miguel Díaz-Canel Bermúdez	Party–State Leader: First Secretary of the Central Committee of the Communist Party of Cuba; President of the Republic	Old	Male
Betsy Díaz Velázquez	Government: Minister of Internal Trade	New	Female
Caridad del Rosario Diego Bello	Central Party Apparatus: Head of the Office of Attention to Religious Affairs of the Central Committee of the Communist Party of Cuba	Old	Female
Norge Fermín Enrich Pons	Intelligence: Head of the Directorate-General of Counterintelligence	New	Male
Ramón Espinosa Martín	Government: Vice Minister of the Revolutionary Armed Forces	Old	Male
Lázaro Fernando Expósito Canto	Provincial: First Secretary of the Santiago de Cuba Provincial Party Committee	Old	Male
Juan Esteban Lazo Hernández	National Assembly: President of the Council of State; President of the National Assembly of People's Power	Old	Male
Marta Elena Feitó Cabrera	Government: Minister of Labour and Social Security	New	Female
Marcia Fernández Andreu	Government: Vice Head of the Secretariat of the Council of Ministers	Old	Female
Luazni Fernández Gutiérrez	State-owned Enterprise: General Director of the General Contractor for Tourism Works, ARCOS Varadero in Cárdenas, Matanzas	New	Male
Marydé Fernández López	Municipal: First Secretary of the Cienfuegos Municipal Party Committee	New	Female
Marisol Fuentes Ferrer	Mass Organization: General Secretary of the Union of Communications, Information Technology and Electronics Workers	Old	Female
Viviana de la Concepción García Escudero	Provincial: Head of the Surgical Intensive Care Unit at the Provincial Hospital "Dr. Gustavo Aldereguía Lima"	New	Female
Zunilda García Garcés	Municipal: First Secretary of the Isla de la Juventud Municipal Party Committee	New	Female
Juan Carlos García Granda	Government: Minister of Tourism	New	Male
Julio César García Rodríguez	Government: Head of the Cuban Civil Missions Office in the Bolivarian Republic of Venezuela	Old	Male
Carlos Luis Garrido Pérez	Provincial: First Secretary of the Ciego de Ávila Provincial Party Committee	New	Male
Caridad Anais Gasmuri González	Research Institution: Head of the Department of Productive Process Control at the Center for Genetic Engineering and Biotechnology in Playa, Havana	New	Female
Alejandro Miguel Gil Fernández	Government: Vice Prime Minister of the Republic; Minister of Economy and Planning	New	Male
Andrés Laureano González Brito	Armed Forces: Head of the Central Army of the Cuban Revolutionary Armed Forces	New	Male
José Alberto González Sánchez	Cooperative: President of the Agricultural Production Cooperative "Paquito González Cueto" in Baraguá, Ciego de Avila	Old	Male
José Miguel Gómez Del Vallín	Intelligence: Head of the Military Counterintelligence Headquarters	New	Male
Ekaterina Gowen Dickinson	Mass Organization: General Secretary of the Sancti Spíritus Municipal Committee of the Workers' Central Union of Cuba	New	Female
Ulises Guilarte De Nacimiento	Mass Organization: General Secretary of the Workers' Central Union of Cuba	Old	Male
Daniuska Gutiérrez González	Cooperative: Specialist in Livestock and Agricultural activities at the "Julio Díaz" Poultry Farm in Palma Soriano, Santiago de Cuba	New	Female
Federico Hernández Hernández	Provincial: First Secretary of the Granma Provincial Party Committee	Old	Male
Gerardo Hernández Nordelo	Mass Organization: National Coordinator of the Committees for the Defense of the Revolution	New	Male
Yanet Hernández Pérez	Provincial: Vice Governor of Havana Province	Old	Female
Liván Izquierdo Alonso	Provincial: First Secretary of the Matanzas Provincial Party Committee	New	Male
Yaritcet Jiménez Argota	Research Institution: Professor at the Faculty of Economic Sciences at the University of Guantánamo	New	Female
Beatriz Johnson Urrutia	Provincial: Governor of Santiago de Cuba Province	New	Female
Ania Guillermina Lastres Morera	National Assembly: Administrative Leader of the National Assembly of People's Power	New	Female
Roberto Legrá Sotolongo	Armed Forces: Second Chief of the General Staff of the Cuban Revolutionary Armed Forces; Chief of the Operations Directorate of the Revolutionary Armed Forces	New	Male
Alexis Lobaina Martínez de Valdivielso	Municipal: Territorial Delegate of Gaviota Varadero in Matanzas	New	Male
Roberto López Hernández	Government: Vice Minister of External Trade	Old	Male
Álvaro López Miera	Government: Minister of the Revolutionary Armed Forces	Old	Male
Humberto Dionil López Suárez	State-owned Enterprise: Director and Host of TV program Hacemos Cuba of the Television Information System of the Cuban Institute of Radio and Television	New	Male
Mirian Marban González	Comptroller General: Vice Comptroller General of the Republic	Old	Female
Ana María Mari Machado	National Assembly: Vice President of the Council of State; Vice President of the National Assembly of People's Power	Old	Female
Manuel Marrero Cruz	Government: Prime Minister of the Republic	New	Male
Arelis Marrero Guerrero	Provincial: Member of the Holguín Provincial Party Committee in charge of Consumption and Services, Tourism, Transport, Communications and Economy	Old	Female
Gladys Martínez Verdecia	Provincial: First Secretary of the Artemisa Provincial Party Committee	New	Female
Dania Marzán Venero	State-owned Enterprise: Legal Advisor at the "Rolando Ayud" Coffee Processing Company in Contramaestre, Santiago de Cuba	New	Female
Yusleidys Menéndez Seijo	State-owned Enterprise: Director of the Tobacco Collection and Processing Company in Minas de Matahambre, Pinar del Río	Old	Female
Alexander Miranda Caballero	Research Institution: General Director of the National Institute of Agricultural Sciences in San José de las Lajas, Mayabeque	New	Male
José Ramón Monteagudo Ruiz	Central Party Apparatus: Head of the Agri-food Department of the Central Committee of the Communist Party of Cuba	Old	Male
Roberto Tomás Morales Ojeda	Central Party Apparatus: Secretary of Organization and Cadre Policy Department Policy	Old	Male
Susely Morfa González	Provincial: Member of the Matanzas Provincial Party Committee in charge of Ideological Work	Old	Female
Anabel Naranjo Paz	Research Institution: Professor at the University of Holguín "Oscar Lucero Moya"	Old	Female
Miriam Nicado García	Research Institution: Rector of the University of Havana	Old	Female
Yailin Orta Rivera	Central Party Apparatus: Director of Granma	New	Female
Rosario Del Pilar Pentón Díaz	Central Party Apparatus: Rector of the Higher School of the Communist Party of Cuba "Ñico López"	Old	Female
Yamila Peña Ojeda	Office of the Attorney General: Attorney General of the Republic	Old	Female
Agustín Peña Porres	Armed Forces: Head of the Eastern Army of the Cuban Revolutionary Armed Forces	New	Male
Jorge Luis Perdomo Di-Lella	Government: Minister of Communications	New	Male
Carlos Ricardo Pérez Díaz	State-owned Enterprise: Director of the Surgical Clinical Hospital "Joaquín Albarrán" in Havana	New	Male
Rafael Pérez Fernández	Provincial: First Secretary of the Guantánamo Provincial Party Committee	Old	Male
Manuel René Pérez Gallego	Provincial: First Secretary of the Las Tunas Provincial Party Committee	New	Male
Deivy Pérez Martín	Provincial: First Secretary of the Sancti Spíritus Provincial Party Committee	New	Female
Félix Duarte Ortega	Central Party Apparatus: Head of the Industry, Construction, Tourism, Transportation and Services Department of the Central Committee of the Communist Party of Cuba	Old	Male
Elba Rosa Pérez Montoya	Government: Minister of Science, Technology and Environment	Old	Female
Yaisel Osvaldo Pieter Terry	Mass Organization: General Secretary of the National Committee of the Public Administration Workers' Union	Old	Male
Rogelio Polanco Fuentes	Central Party Apparatus: Head of the Ideology Department of the Central Committee of the Communist Party of Cuba	Old	Male
José Angel Portal Miranda	Government: Minister of Public Health	Old	Male
Joel Queipo Ruiz	Central Party Apparatus: Head of the Economic Department of the Central Committee of the Communist Party of Cuba	Old	Male
Elier Ramírez Cañedo	Research Institution: Researcher at the History Study Center on the Thought of Fidel Castro Ruz	New	Male
Omar Ramírez Mendoza	State-owned Enterprise: Deputy Director of the National Electricity Union	Old	Male
Yamilé Ramos Cordero	Provincial: Member of the Pinar del Río Provincial Party Committee in charge of economic activity, tourism, consumption and services	New	Female
Elisabet Reyes Velázquez	State-owned Enterprise: Director of the North East Division of the Caribbean Store Chain Company	New	Male
José Amado Ricardo Guerra	Government: Secretary of the Council of Ministers	Old	Male
Dayamí Rodríguez García	Government: Team Director at the Ministry of Construction	Old	Female
Yudí Mercedes Rodríguez Hernández	Provincial: First Secretary of the Villa Clara Provincial Party Committee	Old	Female
Luis Alberto Rodríguez López-Calleja	State-owned Enterprise: President of the Grupo de Administración Empresarial SA (GAESA)	Old	Male
Bruno Eduardo Rodríguez Parrilla	Government: Minister of Foreign Affairs	Old	Male
Julio César Rodríguez Pimentel	Provincial: First Secretary of the Pinar del Río Provincial Party Committee	Old	Male
Isdalis Rodríguez Rodríguez	Mass Organization: Member of the National Secretariat of the Workers' Central Union of Cuba	Old	Female
Víctor Leonardo Rojo Ramos	Armed Forces: Chief Political Section of the Central Army of the Cuban Revolutionary Armed Forces	New	Male
Yoerky Sánchez Cuellar	Central Party Apparatus: Director of Juventud Rebelde	Old	Male
Ariel Santana Santiesteban	Provincial: First Secretary of the Camaguey Provincial Party Committee	Old	Male
Rafael Ramón Santiesteban Pozo	Mass Organization: President of the National Association of Small Farmers	Old	Male
Ernesto Santiesteban Velázquez	Provincial: First Secretary of the Holguin Provincial Party Committee	New	Male
Jorge Luis Tapia Fonseca	Government: Vice Prime Minister of the Republic	Old	Male
Luis Antonio Torres Iríbar	Provincial: First Secretary of the Havana Provincial Party Committee	Old	Male
Carlos César Torres Páez	Research Institution: Director of the Center for Management Studies, Local Development, Tourism and Cooperativism of the University of Pinar del Río "Hermanos Saiz Montes de Oca"	New	Male
Yury Valdés Balbín	Research Institution: Deputy Director at the Carlos Juan Finlay Institute in Havana	New	Male
Salvador Valdés Mesa	Government: Vice President of the Republic	Old	Male
Josefina de la Caridad Vidal Ferreiro	Government: Ambassador of Cuba to Canada	Old	Female
Iliana Vielza Mejías	State-owned Enterprise: Director of Supervision and Control at the Engineering Services Company of the Integrated Project Management (DIP TRASVASE) in Mayarí, Holguin	New	Female
Eduardo Walter Cueli	Provincial: Director of the Provincial Directorate of Economics and Planning at Las Tunas	New	Male
José Alberto Yanes Díaz	Intelligence: First Second Chief of the Political Directorate of the Ministry of Interior	New	Male
Yuleisy Ylisastiguí Oropesa	Municipal: Nursing Advisor at the Municipal Health Directorate in Cardenas, Matanzas	New	Female
