= Unica =

Unica may refer to:

== People ==
- Abbas Ali Atwi (born 1984), Lebanese football player, also known as Onika (also spelled Unica)
- Unica Zürn (1916–1970), German author and artist

== Education ==
- Network of Universities from the Capitals of Europe ("institutional network of the UNIversities from the CApitals of Europe")
- University of Ciego de Ávila, in Ciego de Ávila, Cuba
- University of Cagliari (Italian: Università degli Studi di Cagliari), in Cagliari, Sardinia, Italy

== Music ==
- Unica (La India album), 2010
- Unica (Ornella Vanoni album), 2021

== Other uses ==
- Unica (material), a vulcanised lump paper material
- Unica (river), a karst river of Slovenia
- Unica (typeface)
- UNICA, Brazil (União da Indústria de Cana-de-Açúcar), an association of producers of sugarcane and ethanol fuel in Brazil
- Unica Corporation, an American manufacturer of enterprise marketing management software
- Union and Change, a political party in Venezuela
- Mateba Model 6 Unica, an Italian handgun

== See also ==
- Unitsa, a Russian village
