= UHO =

UHO may refer to:

- United Homeless Organization
- Haluoleo University (Universitas Haluoleo), a university in Indonesia
- University of Holguín (Universidad de Holguín), a university in Cuba
- Uho, the symbol for the chemical element unhexoctium
