= Universidad de Oriente (Cuba) =

Public Cuban university

Coordinates: 20.04345°N 75.81727°W

University of Oriente - Santiago de Cuba
- Universidad de Oriente - Santiago de Cuba
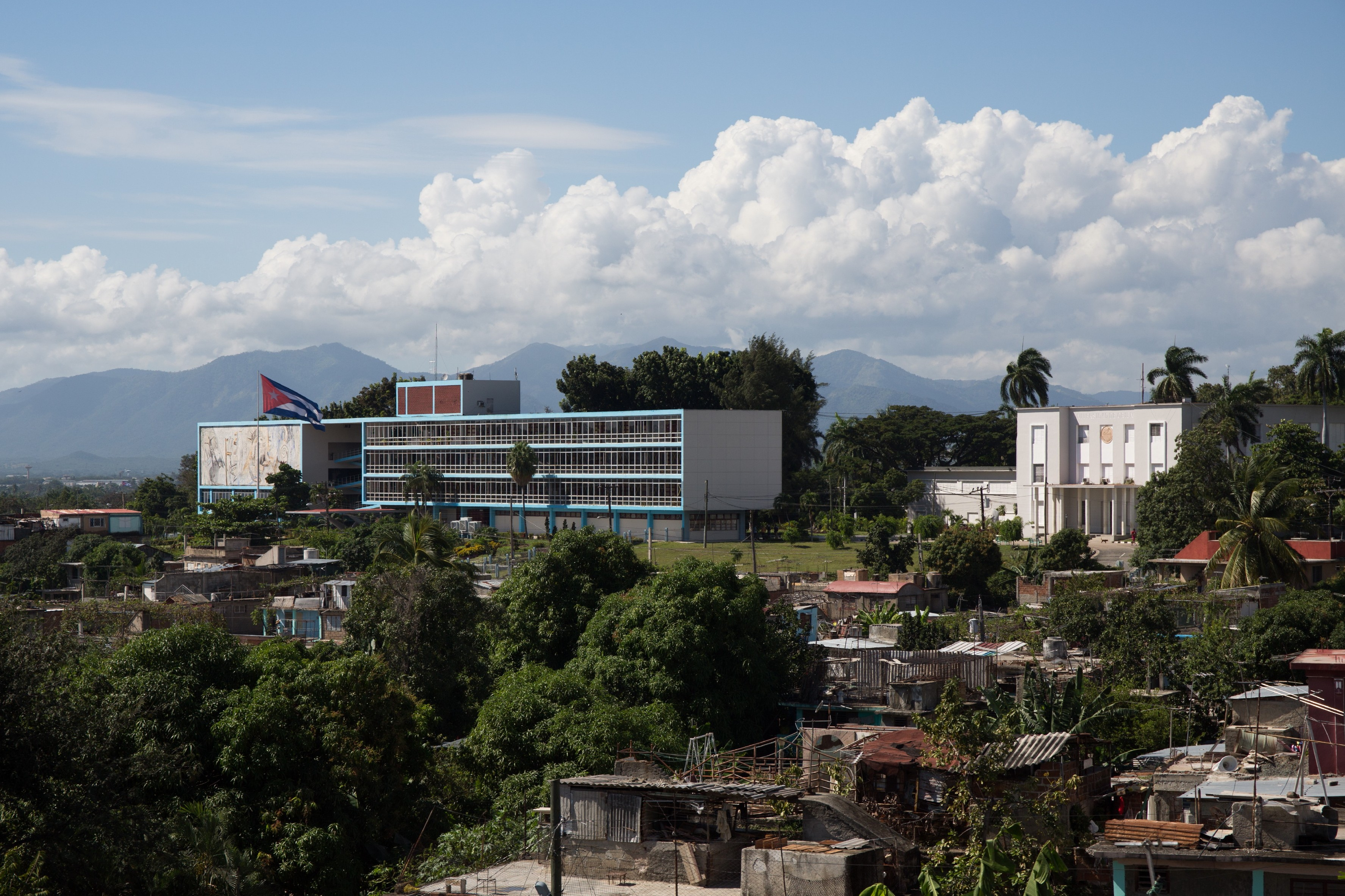
- Motto: Ciencia y conciencia
- Type: Public
- Established: 1947; 79 years ago
- Rector: prof. Zaida Valdés Estrada
- Location: Santiago de Cuba, Cuba
- Website: www.uo.edu.cu

The University of Oriente - Santiago de Cuba (Spanish: Universidad de Oriente - Santiago de Cuba, UO) is a university located in Santiago de Cuba, Cuba. It was founded in 1947 and is organized in 12 Faculties.

== Organization ==
These are the 12 faculties in which the university is divided into:

- Faculty of Social Sciences
- Faculty of Humanities
- Faculty of Law
- Faculty of Economics and Management
- Faculty of Natural Sciences
- Faculty of Mathematics and Computer Science
- Faculty of Distance Education
- Faculty of Chemical Engineering
- Faculty of Mechanical Engineering
- Faculty of Electrical Engineering
- Faculty of Construction
- Faculty of Medicine

== Notable alumni ==
- Asela de los Santos, Cuban revolutionary and educator

== See also ==
- Education in Cuba
- List of universities in Cuba
- Santiago de Cuba
