= 8th Central Committee =

8th Central Committee may refer to:

- Central Committee of the 8th Congress of the Russian Communist Party (Bolsheviks), 1919–1920
- 8th Central Committee of the Chinese Communist Party, 1956–1969
- 8th Central Committee of the Communist Party of Cuba, 2021–2026
- 8th Central Committee of the Workers' Party of Korea, 2021–2026
- 8th Central Committee of the Lao People's Revolutionary Party, 2006–2011
- 8th Central Committee of the Communist Party of Vietnam, 1996–2001
- Central Committee of the 8th Congress of the League of Communists of Yugoslavia, 1964–1969
