= Peter M. Rosset =

- Known for: Research on agroecology, food sovereignty, agrarian reform and peasant farming
- Notable work: World Hunger: Twelve Myths; Food is Different; Agroecology: Science and Politics
- Scientific career
- Fields: Agroecology, food sovereignty, agrarian studies, rural development
- Workplaces: El Colegio de la Frontera Sur (ECOSUR)

Peter Michael Rosset (born June 24, 1955) is an American and Mexican professor and researcher in agroecology, food sovereignty, agrarian reform, rural development and peasant agriculture. He was a professor-researcher in the Department of Agriculture, Society and Environment at El Colegio de la Frontera Sur (ECOSUR) in Chiapas, Mexico, and has held academic positions and research affiliations in the United States, Mexico, Brazil and Thailand.

Rosset served as executive director and later co-director of the Institute for Food and Development Policy (Food First) from 1994 to 2003. He subsequently worked with the Centro de Estudios para el Cambio en el Campo Mexicano (CECCAM) and became co-coordinator of the Land Research Action Network (LRAN). He later joined the international secretariat of La Vía Campesina and worked on its international technical team, including its agroecology and peasant seeds collective.

In 2021, Rosset received the distinction of Investigador Nacional Emérito from Mexico's Sistema Nacional de Investigadores.

== Early life and education ==
Rosset grew up in New York City. His father was publisher Barney Rosset, founder of Grove Press, and his mother was Hannelore "Loly" Rosset (née Eckert), a translator. Rosset attended Brown University. He later earned an M.Sc. in entomology from Imperial College London and a Ph.D. in agricultural ecology from the University of Michigan.

== Career ==
Rosset worked in agricultural research and rural development before joining the Institute for Food and Development Policy (Food First). He became director of the organization in 1994 and served as executive director and co-director until 2003. He subsequently worked with CECCAM and became co-coordinator of the Land Research Action Network. During the 1980s, Rosset worked on sustainable-agriculture and integrated pest-management projects in Central America, including work associated with the Centro Agronómico Tropical de Investigación y Enseñanza (CATIE). He later served as executive director of the Stanford University Regional Center in Chiapas, Mexico. Rosset has held teaching and research affiliations with Stanford University, the University of California, the Universidad Nacional Agraria in Nicaragua, the Universidad Agraria de La Habana and the Universidad Central de Las Villas in Cuba. Rosset later joined the international secretariat of La Vía Campesina and served on its international technical team. His work there included supporting the movement's agroecology and peasant seeds collective. In 2011, Rosset was a researcher at CECCAM and a visiting research scientist at the University of Michigan. From 2013 until his retirement in 2025, Rosset was a professor-researcher in the Department of Agriculture, Society and Environment at ECOSUR. He also served as a collaborating professor at Universidade Estadual Paulista, a permanent professor at Universidade Estadual do Ceará, a Bualuang ASEAN Chair Professor at Thammasat University, and a researcher at Chulalongkorn University.

== Research ==
Rosset's widely cited research has focused on agroecology, food sovereignty, agrarian reform, rural development and peasant farming. His publications have addressed the economic, social and ecological roles of small farms and the effects of agricultural trade policies on rural communities. His 1999 policy paper The Multiple Functions and Benefits of Small Farm Agriculture in the Context of Global Trade Negotiations discussed economic, social and environmental functions of small-scale agriculture in the context of international agricultural trade negotiations. Rosset has also written about hunger, access to resources and agricultural policy. He was a co-author of the second edition of World Hunger: Twelve Myths with Frances Moore Lappé, Joseph Collins and Luis Esparza. His book Food is Different: Why We Must Get the WTO Out of Agriculture addressed agricultural trade liberalization and its effects on agriculture and rural communities.

== Agroecology ==
Rosset co-edited Agroecology with C. Ronald Carroll and John H. Vandermeer in 1990. His research on agroecology has addressed agricultural practices, agricultural knowledge and the relationship between agroecology and rural social movements. In work with María Elena Martínez-Torres, he examined the development of agroecology within La Vía Campesina and exchanges among academic, traditional and local forms of knowledge. Rosset has also published research on the Campesino a Campesino movement and farmer-to-farmer approaches to the dissemination of agroecological knowledge. A 2011 study co-authored with Braulio Machín Sosa, Adilén María Roque Jaime and Dana Rocío Ávila Lozano examined the Campesino-to-Campesino agroecology movement of the Asociación Nacional de Agricultores Pequeños in Cuba. In a 2021 article with Lia Pinheiro Barbosa, Valentín Val and Nils McCune, Rosset examined approaches to agroecology in Latin America and their relationship with social movements and different forms of knowledge.

== Food sovereignty ==
Rosset's publications on food sovereignty have addressed agricultural trade, land reform and rural social movements. His work with La Vía Campesina has examined the relationship between food sovereignty and agroecology. His 2009 article 'Agrofuels, Food Sovereignty, and the Contemporary Food Crisis' addressed biofuels, agricultural policy and the global food crisis.

== Scholar-activism ==
In a 2016 inaugural lecture at the International Institute of Social Studies of Erasmus University Rotterdam, Saturnino M. Borras Jr. discussed Rosset as an example of scholar-activism in agrarian studies. Borras described Rosset's work with Food First, his subsequent involvement with La Vía Campesina and his concurrent academic work.

== Awards and honours ==
In 2021, Mexico's Sistema Nacional de Investigadores awarded Rosset the distinction of Investigador Nacional Emérito. In October 2021, the University Council of the Universidade Estadual do Ceará approved the conferral of the title of professor honoris causa on Rosset. The title was conferred at a ceremony in May 2022. Rosset is included in the science-wide author databases of the top 2% most widely cited scientists in various disciplines based on the top 100,000 scientists by c-score (with and without self-citations) or a percentile rank of 2% or above in their sub-field compiled by John P. A. Ioannidis, Kevin W. Boyack and Jeroen Baas and published through the Elsevier Data Repository. The databases include annual editions covering 2020 through 2025 and classify Rosset under Social Sciences.

== Books ==
Rosset has authored, co-authored or edited books on hunger, agricultural policy, food sovereignty, agroecology and rural social movements. His books have been reviewed in peer-reviewed academic journals. Food is Different was reviewed in Gastronomica (2007), Experimental Agriculture (2007), Agriculture and Human Values (2008) and the Journal of International Development (2010). Promised Land: Competing Visions of Agrarian Reform was reviewed in Development in Practice (2007), the Journal of Agrarian Change (2007), Development and Change (2008) and African Studies Review (2009). Sustainable Agriculture and Resistance was reviewed in Economic Development and Cultural Change (2003) and the Review of Radical Political Economics (2007). The second edition of World Hunger: Twelve Myths was reviewed twice in Agriculture and Human Values (2000, 2002). Agroecology: Science and Politics was reviewed in The Journal of Peasant Studies (2019) and, in its Spanish edition, in Ciencia, Ambiente y Clima (2019).

=== Selected books ===
- The Nicaragua Reader: Documents of a Revolution Under Fire (1983), edited with John H. Vandermeer
- Agroecology (1990), edited with C. Ronald Carroll and John H. Vandermeer
- A Cautionary Tale: Failed U.S. Development Policy in Central America (1996), with Michael E. Conroy and Douglas L. Murray
- World Hunger: Twelve Myths, second edition (1998), with Frances Moore Lappé, Joseph Collins and Luis Esparza
- Sustainable Agriculture and Resistance: Transforming Food Production in Cuba (2002), edited with Fernando Funes and others
- Food is Different: Why We Must Get the WTO Out of Agriculture (2006)
- Agroecology: Science and Politics, with Miguel A. Altieri
- Lessons from the Zapatistas, with Lia Pinheiro Barbosa
- Promised Land: Competing Visions of Agrarian Reform, edited with Raj Patel and Michael Courville

== Selected publications ==
- Rosset, Peter M. 'The Multiple Functions and Benefits of Small Farm Agriculture in the Context of Global Trade Negotiations' (1999).
- Rosset, Peter M. 'Agrofuels, Food Sovereignty, and the Contemporary Food Crisis' (2009).
- Rosset, Peter M. 'Preventing hunger: Change economic policy'. Nature 479 (2011): 472–473.
- Rosset, Peter M.; Martínez-Torres, María Elena. 'Diálogo de saberes in La Vía Campesina: food sovereignty and agroecology'. The Journal of Peasant Studies 41(6) (2014): 979–997.
- Rosset, Peter M.; Barbosa, Lia Pinheiro; Val, Valentín; McCune, Nils. 'Pensamiento Latinoamericano Agroecológico: the emergence of a critical Latin American agroecology?' Agroecology and Sustainable Food Systems 45, no. 1 (2021): 42–64.
