= University of Camagüey =

Public university in Camagüey, Cuba

Coordinates: 21.38877°N 77.88250°W

University of Camagüey "Ignacio Agramonte Loynaz"
- Universidad de Camagüey "Ignacio Agramonte Loynaz"
- Type: Public
- Established: 1967; 58 years ago
- Rector: Dr.C. Santiago Lajes Choy
- Location: Camagüey, Cuba
- Website: www.reduc.edu.cu/

The University of Camagüey "Ignacio Agramonte" (Spanish: Universidad de Camagüey, UC) is a public university located in Camagüey, Cuba. It was founded in 1967 as the Centro Universitario de Camagüey and incorporated institutions previously part of the Universidad de Las Villas.

The University of Camagüey is organized in ten Faculties, Agricultural Sciences, Economics and Business Administration, Social and Humanistic Sciences, Construction, Law, Electromechanics, Informatics, Languages, Communication, and Chemistry.

== Scientific Publications ==
The UC currently has 8 scientific journals, most of them accredited in the National Registry of Serial Publications.

- Revista de Producción Animal (Animal Production Journal). Animal Production Magazine. Founded in 1985, by the Faculty of Agricultural Sciences. It has a printed and digital version. Has an English version.
- Retos de la Dirección (Management Challenges). Founded in 2007, by the Faculty of Economic and Legal Sciences. It has a printed and digital version. Has an English version.
- Transformación (Transformation) Edited by the Department of Scientific - Pedagogical Information of the Directorate of Technical Scientific Information.
- Agrisost Founded in 1995 at the then José Martí Higher Pedagogical Institute, it belongs to the Faculty of Agricultural Sciences and publishes about sustainable agriculture and its teaching.
- Monteverdia - Dedicated to environmental studies.
- Arcada (Arcade). Electronic journal. Edited by the Faculty of Constructions.
- Ciencia y deportes (Science and Sports - Journal of the Faculty of Sports

The UC also has an institutional digital repository where you can consult the postgraduate theses and scientific publications, in Rediuc

== See also ==
- Education in Cuba
- List of colleges and universities in Cuba
- Camagüey
