= University of Cienfuegos =

Coordinates: 22.1732°N 80.4508°W

University of Cienfuegos "Carlos Rafael Rodríguez"
- Universidad de Cienfuegos "Carlos Rafael Rodríguez"
- Type: Public
- Rector: prof. Juan Cogollos
- Location: Cienfuegos, Cuba
- Website: www.ucf.edu.cu/

The University of Cienfuegos "Carlos Rafael Rodríguez" (Spanish: Universidad de Cienfuegos "Carlos Rafael Rodríguez", UCF) is a public university located in Cienfuegos, Cuba.

== Faculties ==
The university houses the following faculties:

- Agrarian Sciences
- Economic and Enterprise Sciences
- Engineering
- Social Sciences and Humanities

== See also ==
- Cienfuegos
- Education in Cuba
- List of universities in Cuba
