= Polytechnic José Antonio Echeverría =

Cuban public research university

Coordinates: 23°03′18″N 82°24′58″W

Technological University of Havana "José Antonio Echeverría"
- Universidad Tecnológica de la Habana José Antonio Echeverría
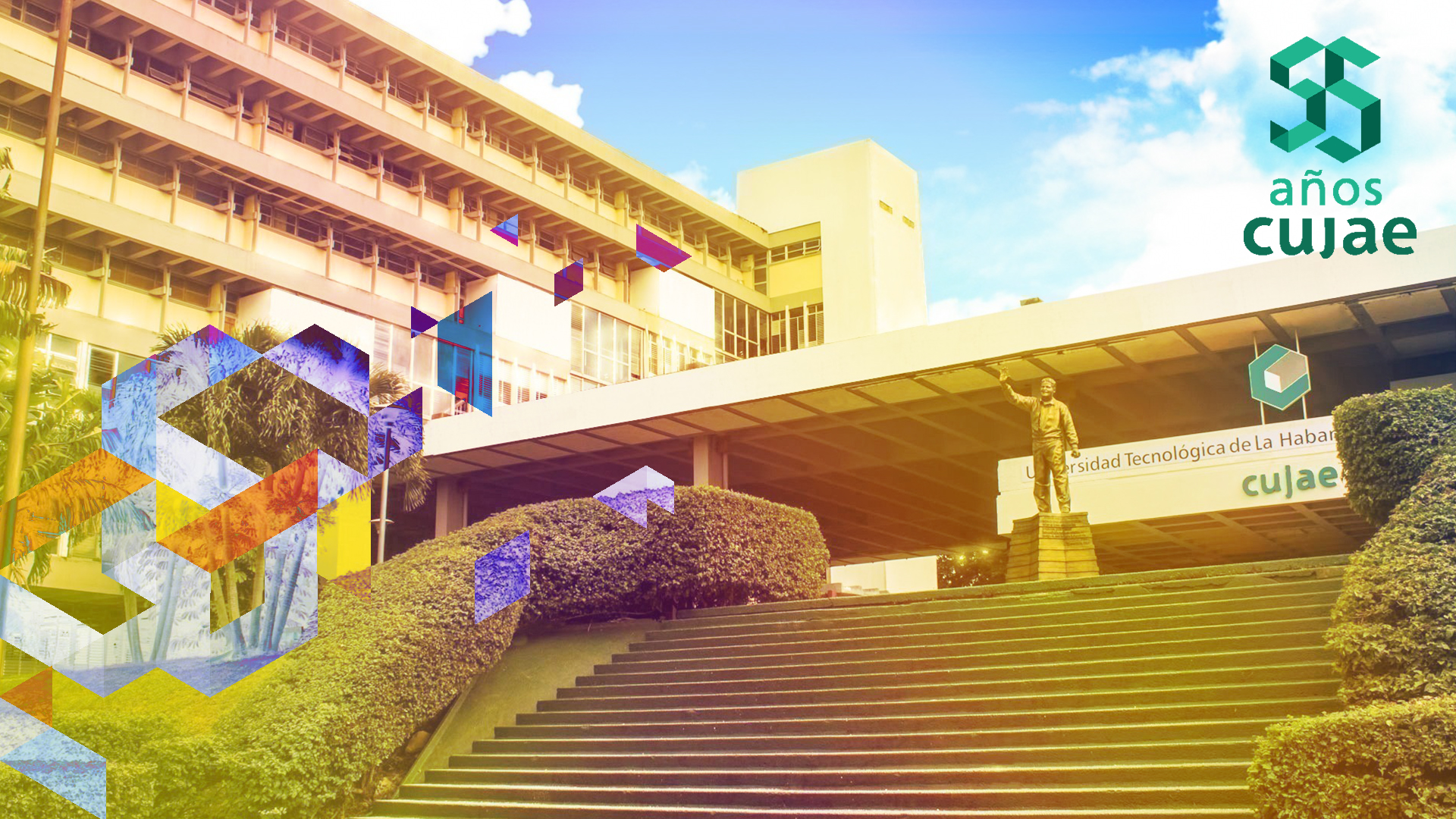
- Main entrance of the CUJAE
- Other name: Ciudad Universitaria José Antonio Echeverría (CUJAE)
- Motto: Cada uno cuenta
- Motto in English: "Each one counts"
- Type: Public
- Established: 2 December 1964; 61 years ago
- Founder: Fidel Castro Ruz
- Rector: Dr.Ing. Modesto Ricardo Gómez Crespo
- Principal: Dr.Ing. Martha Delgado Dapena (Vice-Chancellor 1st); Dra.Ing. Anaisa Hernández González (Educational); Dr.Ing. Daniel Alfonso Robaina (Research and Postgraduate); Dr. Arc. Alberto Rueda Guzman (University Extension); Dr.Ing. José Acevedo Suárez (Economy and Administration)
- Academic staff: +900
- Administrative staff: +1,200
- Students: +7,500
- Location: Street 114 # 11901 / Ciclovía and Rotonda, Marianao, Havana, 19390, Cuba
- Campus: multiple sites
- Language: Spanish
- Colours: Green and White
- Website: www.cujae.edu.cu
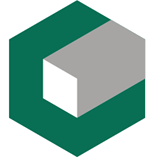
- Categorized as University of Excellence

The José Antonio Echeverría Technological University, in its beginnings the José Antonio Echeverría University City (CUJAE), is an undergraduate, post-graduate and doctoral research university located in Marianao, Havana, Cuba. It is controlled by the Cuban Ministry of Education.

On February 15, 2017, the National Accreditation Board awarded it the category of "superior university of excellence", for its comprehensive training of students, research and impact in the country.

== History ==
The history of CUJAE has its antecedents in the old School of Engineers, Electricians and Architects of the University of Havana, created on June 30, 1900, when the Military Orders for this purpose. At the beginning, it began in the old convent of San Agustín, today the Carlos J. Finlay Museum of the History of Medicine, and then moved on to La Colina, attached to the Faculty of Sciences and Letters of that University Center, with the careers of Civil Engineering and Electrical Engineering, adding that of Architecture, the first of October of the same year.

As a result of the reform movement that began in 1923, there is a significant turnaround in the programs that had not been reviewed for some twenty years, causing changes in the curricula of the three aforementioned careers. In 1925 it became the School of Engineers and Architects, continuing within the Faculty of Letters and Sciences.

When the teaching law of 1937 was promulgated, twelve Faculties were created at the University of Havana, among them the Faculty of Engineering and Architecture appears with new programs for Civil Engineering, Electrical Engineering and Architecture, which remained in force with slight modifications until 1960.

In January 1943 this Faculty is divided into two: Engineering, where they continue to study Civil Engineering and Electrical Engineering, and Architecture, with the degree of the same name.

The incorporation of a broad student movement to the insurrectionary process organized at that time to overthrow the government of the day, caused the closure of the university in the year 1956, which did not reopen until after the revolutionary triumph of January 1, 1959.

With the Triumph of the Revolution on January 1, 1959, a stage of revolutionary transformations at the national level began in Cuba and among the first were educational ones. Thus the conditions were created to initiate a true university reform, inspired by Varela, Martí, Mella, Varona.

On November 18, 1961, the Faculty of Technology of the University of Havana was founded, and on January 10, 1962, it was officially ratified by the University Reform Law, being integrated again, with six Schools : Civil Engineering, Electrical Engineering, Industrial Engineering, Mechanical Engineering, Chemical Engineering and Architecture. Later they would appear: Mining Engineering, Geophysical Engineering, Hydraulic Engineering, Sugar Engineering and the careers of medium technical level: Hydrotechnics and Topography.

== Construction ==
In September 1960, the commander-in-chief Fidel Castro announced the purpose of building a university city; he name her José Antonio Echeverría. There were three possible places for its realization, and by consensus the neighboring Central Toledo, today Central Manuel Martínez Prieto, in the current municipality of Marianao was chosen.

On March 13, 1961, in commemoration of the fourth anniversary of the assault on the Presidential Palace and the taking of Radio Reloj, the construction works were officially inaugurated. In the year of 1962 the construction work had advanced considerably but the urgent need for capital to subsidize the completion of the project remained. To this end, the engineer Altshuler prepared a report on the Request for Technical Assistance to the United Nations Special Fund, a request that met with the opposition of the representative of the United States, but since there were no strong reasons to reject it, they then looked for a way to obstruct it always postponing its treatment in the Assemblies of said Organization.

Pressure from the Cuban diplomatic headquarters led to the organization of a mission in April 1965 made up of Messrs Didier Manheimer, Consulting Engineer, Director of the Societé Internacionale de Formation, of France, and Audun Ofjord, Director of Bergen Materials Test and Research Laboratory. The visit verified that the report sent had been fulfilled, and that the Faculty was a concrete reality, since the teaching staff and students had been developed and the facility was largely built. The project was approved in October of that same year, granting the figure of $2 007 600,00 USD.

Finally on December 2, 1964, Fidel Castro inaugurated in this Capital, the University City José Antonio Echeverría, (CUJAE), occupying its facilities the Faculty of Technology of the University of Havana and the leveling courses, designed to properly train high school graduates who aspired to study engineering careers.

== Structural Changes ==
On July 29, 1976, the José Antonio Echeverría Higher Polytechnic Institute was founded, by decision of the recently created Ministry of Higher Education (MES), which immediately promoted a national network of Higher Education Centers (CES), as a consequence of the growth in enrollment in the few existing universities and due to the justified need to improve the National System at that level.

Thus, the Faculty of Technology is definitively separated from the University of Havana, becoming the José Antonio Echeverría CUJAE Higher Polytechnic Institute, being defined by Law as the Center in charge of the training of specialists in the field of technical sciences and it is conferred the responsibility of being the Rector Center of Architecture and engineering (Technical Sciences) taught in it, except those related to Mining Engineering and Agronomic Engineering that are no longer studied at the CUJAE and that transferred their rectories to the Higher Institute of Metallurgical Mining of Moa and the Agrarian University of Havana.

With an independent structure, this university begins its teaching activities in the academic year 1976 - 1977 and with it is would also open a new faculty, the Azucarera, whose antecedents are embedded in the Branch created in 1972 in the Central "Camilo Cienfuegos".

On June 30, 2016, the agreement No. 7943 of the executive committee of the Council of Ministers is taken, in which the integration of the universities in Cuba is concluded, where the approval of the change of name of Cuba is adopted in the sixth agreement. Higher Polytechnic Institute "José Antonio Echeverría", to Technological University of Havana "José Antonio Echeverría", with the acronym CUJAE, giving both national and international character of university.

== Facilities ==
The CUJAE is made up of more than forty buildings and covers an area of 398 000 square meters where classrooms, laboratories, conference rooms, research centers, libraries, workshops, warehouses, dormitories, dining rooms, cafeterias, administrative offices, teaching offices are included, theaters, sports gyms, sports fields, medical dispensary, student recreation house, post office, publishing department, printing press, and all kinds of facilities that contribute to the correct preparation of students.

== Organization ==
The CUJAE has 9 faculties where 13 careers are studied. It has 12 research centers, associated almost entirely to the faculties, they constitute the nucleus par excellence of scientific work, where the most relevant and most important groups of results are grouped.

The faculties are:

- Faculty of Architecture
- Faculty of Automation and Biomedical Engineering
- Faculty of Civil Engineering
- Faculty of Electrical Engineering
- Faculty of Industrial Engineering
- Faculty of Mechanical Engineering
- Faculty of Chemical Engineering
- Faculty of Computer Engineering
- Faculty of Telecommunications Engineering

The programs are:

- Architecture
- Automation engineering
- Biomedical engineering
- Civil engineering
- Electric engineering
- Geophysical engineering
- Hydraulic engineering
- Industrial engineering
- Informatics engineering
- Mechanical engineering
- Metallurgy and materials engineering
- Chemical engineering
- Telecommunications and electronics engineering

The Centers are:

- CIH, Center for Hydraulic Research (1969).
- CIME, Center for Microelectronics Research (1969).
- CETDIR, Center for Studies in Management Techniques (1987).
- CIPEL, Center for Electro-Energy Research and Tests (1988).
- CECAT, Center for Construction and Tropical Architecture (1989).
- CETER, Center for Studies on Renewable Energy Technologies (1992).
- CIPRO, Center for Process Engineering Studies (1994).
- CEIM, Center for Innovation and Maintenance Studies (1995).
- CREA, Reference Center for Advanced Education (1998).
- CEBIO Center for Biomedical Studies (2000).
- CITI, Complex of Integrated Technological Research (2000).
- CEMAT, Center for Mathematical Studies for Technical Sciences (2000).

Throughout its history, Cujae has graduated more than fifty thousand professionals, of which two thousand have been foreign students, mainly from Latin American, African and Asian countries. The institute has also developed more than ninety international projects and maintains ties of friendship and academic exchange with more than two hundred universities in the world.

== Symbols ==
The lyrics and music of the Cujae university anthem, Alma Cujae, was composed in 2014 by Israel Rojas Fiel, leader of the Duo Buena Fe, as a gift to the institute on its 50th anniversary. Hymn, which was heard for the first time at the opening ceremony of the 2014–2015 academic year, exalts the values and pride of Cujaeños in belonging to this House of Higher Studies.

Old Flag of the Cujae

== Rectors ==
Here is the list of deans and rectors that the Faculty of Technology and later the Higher Polytechnic Institute have had since its founding date:

=== Deans of the Faculty of Technology (1961-1976) ===
- Ing. Diosdado Pérez Franco (1961-1965)
- Ing. Miguel Llaneras Rodríguez (1965-1966)
- Arq. Eduardo Granados Navarro (1966-1967)
- Arq. Gonzalo de Quesada Mesa (1967-1971)
- Ing. José Arañaburo García (1971-1973)
- Ing. José Lavandero García (1973-1976)
- Ing. Orlando Olivera Martín (1976)

=== Rectors of the Cujae (1976-2021) ===
- Dr. Ing. Orlando Olivera Martín (1976-1979)
- Dr. Ing. Rodolfo Alarcón Ortiz (1979-1987)
- Dr. Ing. Antonio Romillo Tarke (1987-1998)
- Dr. Ing. Arturo Bada González (1998-2004)
- Dr. Ing. Gustavo Cobreiro Suárez (2004-2009)
- Dra. Ing. Alicia Alonso Becerra (2009-2019)
- Dr. Ing. Modesto Ricardo Gómez Crespo (2019)

== Doctors Honoris Causa ==
- Fidel Castro Ruz
- Eusebio Leal Spengler
- Diosdado Pérez Franco
- Fernando Carlos Vecino Alegret
- Mario Coyula Cowley
- José Bienvenido Martínez Rodríguez
- Roberto Segré Pando
- Vitervo O´Reilly Díaz
- José Altshuler Gutber
- Jorge Acevedo Catá
- Sixto Antonio Ruiz de Alejo
- Hugo Rafael Wainshtok Rivas
- Raúl González Romero
- Francisco Medinas Torri
- Luis Blanca Fernández
- Leonardo Ruiz Alejo
- José Lavandero García
- Norberto Marrero de León
- Gilda Vega Cruz
- Lourdes Zumalacárregui de Cárdenas
- Ruben Bancrofft Hernández
- Rafael Antonio Pardo Gómez
- Alcides Juan León Méndez

== Publications ==
It currently has ten digital scientific journals, oriented to topics related to engineering, architecture and pedagogy:

1. Cuban Journal of Engineering
2. Journal Architecture and Urbanism
3. Journal Hydraulic and Environmental
4. Journal Mechanical Engineering
5. Journal Electronic, Automatic and Communications Engineering
6. Journal Energy Engineering
7. Journal Industrial Engineering
8. Journal Pedagogical Reference
9. Journal Telematics
10. Journal Science and Construction
11. National Student Journal of Engineering and Architecture

== CUJAE Project ==
The CUJAE is in a constructive process, which from 2017 to 2021 has as its objective the renovation of the center. The objective is to have the highest technology in each of its spaces: classrooms, laboratories, libraries, theaters, among others.

The CUJAE Project has its antecedents in the act for the 50th anniversary of the institution chaired by Raúl Castro, president of the Councils of States and Ministers, who gave the orientation of "putting the school at the height of the times current ". Being a university of technical sciences and that prepares students in architecture and engineering who are capable of carrying out projects for production, it was decided that they could carry out the projects in the school, but based on the improvement of it.

== Internet ==
Institution has a decentralized intranet system within its campus, with different servers used by the institution and managed by faculty members and students. The network offers access to digital academic materials like e-books and scholarly articles.

Internet on the other hand is restricted by a proxy server Squid for linux that allows controlled access for its users (teachers and students of the CUJAE). It has recently increased its speed and types of access, now allowing remote telephone access and greater information traffic.

== Gallery ==
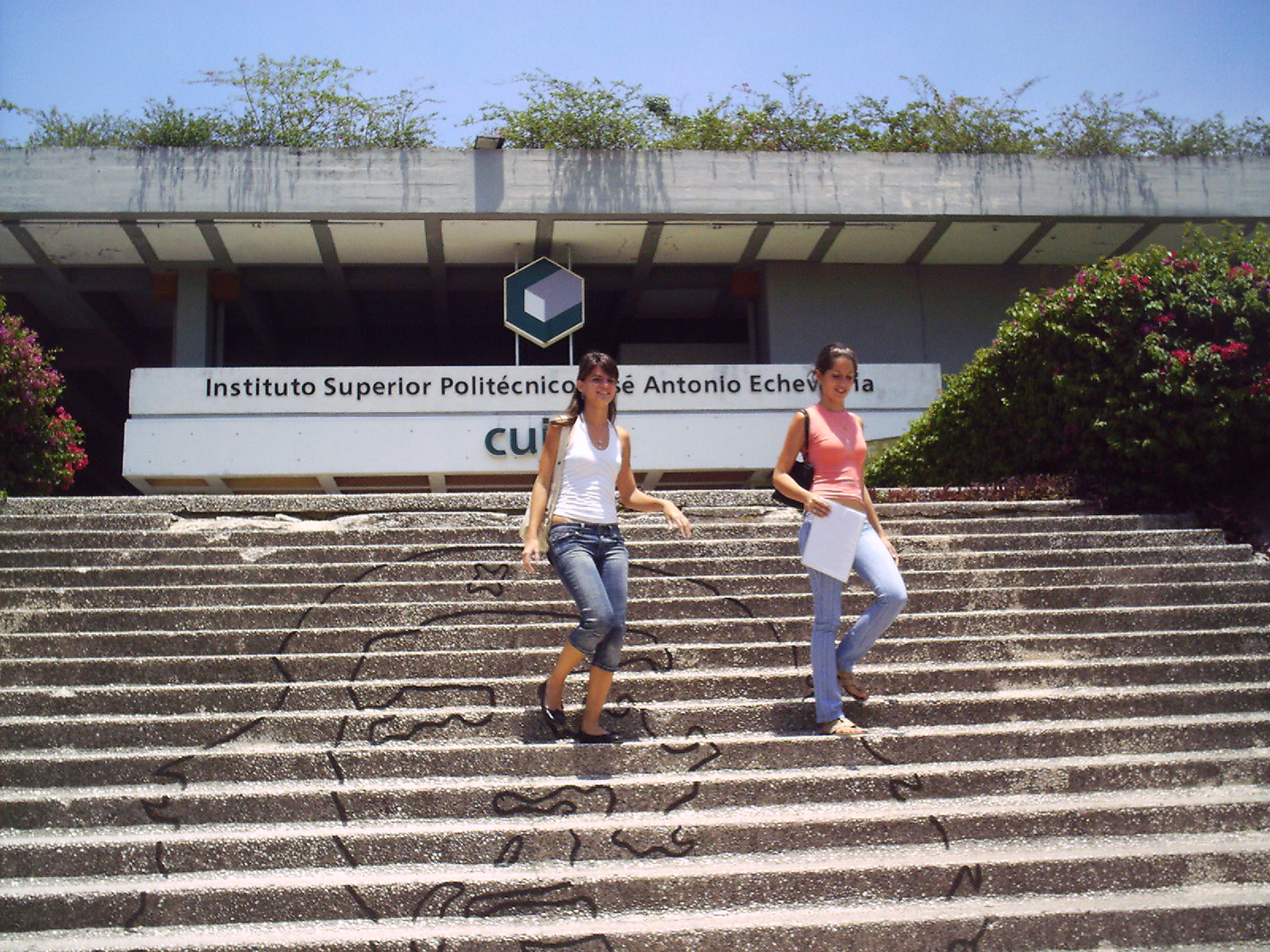
Main entrance

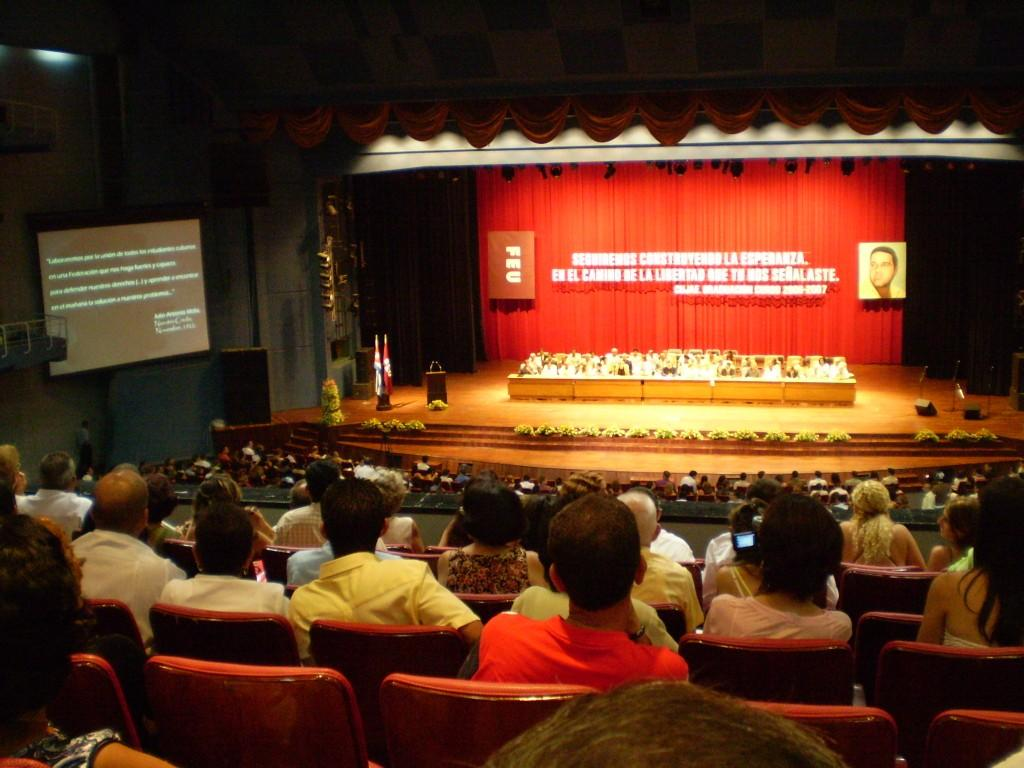
Graduation ceremony

== See also ==
- Education in Cuba
- Havana
- List of universities in Cuba
- Education in Cuba
