= University of Sancti Spíritus =

University in Sancti Spíritus, Cuba

Coordinates: 21.92938°N 79.43722°W

University of Sancti Spíritus "UNISS"
- Universidad de Sancti Spíritus "UNISS"
- Type: Public
- Established: 1983; 42 years ago
- Rector: Dr. Cs Manuel Guillermo Valle Fasco
- Location: Sancti Spíritus, Cuba

The University of Sancti Spíritus "José Martí Pérez" (Spanish: Universidad de Sancti Spíritus "José Martí Pérez", UNISS) is a public university located in Sancti Spíritus, Cuba. It was founded in September 1983.

The University has five faculties:

- Agricultural Services
- Pedagogical Sciences
- Technical and Business Sciences
- Physical Culture
- Humanities

== See also ==
- Education in Cuba
- List of universities in Cuba
- Sancti Spíritus
