= Elián González =

Cuban boy in 2000 international custody dispute

- González in 2000

Member of the National Assembly of People's Power
- Incumbent
- Assumed office April 19, 2023
- Constituency: Cárdenas

Personal details
- Born: December 6, 1993 (age 32) Cárdenas, Cuba
- Party: Communist Party of Cuba
- Parent(s): Juan Miguel González Quintana (father); Elizabeth Brotons Rodríguez (mother, deceased)
- Relatives: Lázaro González (paternal granduncle)
- Education: University of Matanzas
- Known for: Child custody and immigration case

Elián González Brotons (born December 6, 1993) is a Cuban engineer and politician. As a six-year-old child, he was at the center of a high-profile international custody dispute between members of his family that also involved Cuba and the United States.

On November 21, 1999, Elián's mother, her partner, and Elián fled Cuba by boat as part of a group of refugees attempting to reach the United States. The boat sank during the journey, and Elián's mother, along with most of the passengers, drowned. Elián was found floating on an inner tube and rescued by two fishermen, who turned him over to the U.S. Coast Guard. Elián was taken to a hospital and treated for dehydration and minor cuts. In addition to Elián, a young couple survived and reached shore separately.

The Immigration and Naturalization Service (INS) granted Elián temporary permission to stay in the U.S. and placed him with his granduncle, Lázaro González, in Miami. His granduncle wanted Elián to remain in the country, while his father, Juan Miguel González, sought his return to Cuba. This led to a high-profile and protracted custody battle involving his father, his Miami relatives, and U.S. and Cuban officials. Elián was returned to his father's custody after an INS raid on his Miami relatives' home on April 22, 2000. They returned to Cuba when the legal dispute concluded on June 28, 2000. González has openly stated that he never had regrets about his return to Cuba.

Elián González grew up in Cuba, earned an engineering degree, and worked as an industrial engineer. In 2023, he was elected to the National Assembly of People's Power, representing Cárdenas, Cuba.

== Early life ==
Elián González was born December 6, 1993, to divorced parents. Although his parents divorced in 1991 after six years of marriage, the couple would separate for good in 1996, but both remained close with their son. They split custody of Elián, who spent up to five nights a week with his father or one of his grandmothers and the rest of the time with his mother.

=== Journey to Florida ===
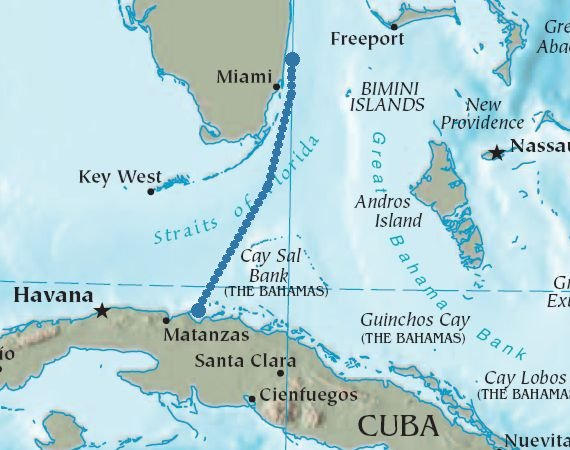
The journey from Cárdenas, Cuba, to Florida

On November 21, 1999, González, his mother Elizabeth Brotons Rodríguez, and twelve others left Cuba on a small aluminum boat with a faulty engine; González's mother and ten others died in the crossing, and their bodies were never recovered. González floated at sea on an inner tube until he was rescued by two fishermen, who handed him over to the United States Coast Guard. The two other survivors of the journey, a young couple, made it to the Florida coast separately.

According to González's adult cousin Marisleysis, Elián told her that the boat's motor broke down and they tried in vain to bail out the water with nylon bags, but a storm doomed their efforts. He told her he tried to help get the water out and his mother's boyfriend placed him in an inner tube for safety. "He said afterwards that he fell asleep and that when he woke up he never saw his mother again". He said, "I think she drowned too because she didn't know how to swim".

Nivaldo Fernández Ferrán, one of the three survivors on the boat, said, "Elizabeth protected her son to the end". According to Fernández Ferrán, they set out on their trip at 4 am, dragging inflated rubber floats, or inner tubes, in case they needed them. As they encountered bad weather, the boat's engine failed and the craft began to fill with water. After it went under, the passengers clung to the inner tubes in cold water, with waves reaching heights of three to four meters (10 to 13 feet).

Afterwards, the Immigration and Naturalization Service (INS) released González to his paternal granduncle, Lázaro. According to The Washington Post, González's father, Juan Miguel González Quintana, had telephoned Lázaro from Cuba on November 22, 1999, to advise that González and his mother had left Cuba without Juan Miguel's knowledge, and to watch for their arrival.

=== Custody dispute in the United States ===
The U.S. legislation system had enacted the Cuban Adjustment Act in 1966, which sought to provide political asylum for Cubans who fled their country in the hopes of a new life. Under the act, Cuban refugees without visas entering the United States were paroled, and after a year could apply for permanent resident status. The US also issued 20,000 lottery visas every year to Cuban emigrants under the wet foot, dry foot policy. Under this policy, those who reached the mainland were granted asylum, while those who were intercepted at sea by the U.S. Coast Guard were sent back to Cuba.

Lázaro González, backed by local Cuban Americans, took the position that the boy should remain in the United States and not be returned to his father. Marisleysis González (Lázaro's adult daughter) became Elián González's caregiver and spokesperson for the paternal relatives. Also, Armando Gutierrez, a local Cuban-American businessman, became a spokesman. At the same time, Juan Miguel, with the support of Cuban authorities, demanded that his son be returned to Cuba.

On January 21, 2000, Elián González's grandmothers, Mariela Quintana and Raquel Rodríguez, flew from Havana to the United States to seek their grandson's return to Cuba. While they were able to meet with the boy only once at the Miami Beach home of Barry University president Sister Jeanne O'Laughlin, they journeyed to Washington and met with congressmen and Attorney General Janet Reno. After nine days of media coverage (during which Republican lawmakers acknowledged they did not have the votes to pass a bill to give González U.S. citizenship), they returned to Cuba to "a hero's welcome".

On January 28, the Spanish foreign minister Abel Matutes called for the boy's return to Cuba, stating that international law dictated the return. Meanwhile, the González family in Miami denied allegations that they had offered Juan Miguel a house and a car if he abandoned the action and joined his son in Miami. Juan Miguel said he was uninterested in emigrating.

Through January and February, Juan Miguel sent a number of open letters to the U.S. government—published in, among other places, the Cuban newspaper Granma—demanding the return of his son and refusing the Miami relatives' demands.

Chicago-based fathers' rights attorney Jeffery M. Leving spearheaded the amicus brief, which set the foundation of the custody case to reunite González with his father in Cuba. Manuel González, Elián Gonzalez's granduncle, later retained Leving to reunite González with his father.

On March 21, Judge Kevin Michael Moore of the United States District Court for the Southern District of Florida dismissed the relatives' petition for asylum which they had filed on behalf of Elián González. Lázaro vowed to appeal. On March 29, Miami-Dade County mayor Alex Penelas was joined by 22 other civic leaders in a speech in downtown Miami. Penelas indicated that the municipality would not cooperate with Federal authorities on any repatriation of the boy, and would not lend police assets or any other assistance in taking the boy.

On April 14, a video was released in which Elián González told Juan Miguel that he wanted to stay in the United States. However, many thought that he had been coached, as a male voice was heard off-camera directing the young boy. In a September 2005 interview with 60 Minutes after being sent back to Cuba, González stated that during his stay in the U.S., his family members were "telling me bad things about [my father]", and "were also telling me to tell him that I did not want to go back to Cuba, and I always told them I wanted to."

Elián González remained a subject of media attention as he went to Walt Disney World Resort one day, then met with politicians the next. Throughout the custody battle, opinion polls showed that a majority of Americans believed González should be returned to his father in Cuba, and that doing so was in the boy's best interest.

Attorney General Janet Reno ordered the return of Elián González to his father and set a deadline of April 13, 2000, but the Miami relatives defied the order. Negotiations continued for several days as the house was surrounded by protesters as well as police. The relatives insisted on guarantees that they could live with the child for several months and retain custody, and that González would not be returned to Cuba. Negotiations carried on throughout the night, but Reno stated that the relatives rejected all workable solutions.

On April 19, the United States Court of Appeals for the Eleventh Circuit in Atlanta ruled that González must remain in the U.S. until his family in Miami could appeal for an asylum hearing in May.

On January 10, 2000, a Florida state court had ruled that the Florida family court was able to decide the merit of motion related with temporary custody by Lázaro González, stating that Elián should stay with the Miami relatives until a further custody hearing. However, Attorney General Janet Reno declared that the federal courts are responsible for deciding this case, and that the Miami relatives must appeal to the federal court. Here, the objective of Reno was to provide the relatives with a chance to provide "any information" they could that would be "relevant in the decision". She again emphasized that the INS commissioner had declared that the father speaks for the son, and that his wishes were to have his son returned to him.

The judge's order cleared the way for González to be returned to his father's custody. On April 19, Reno accepted a last-ditch offer at mediation between González's relatives from University of Miami president Edward T. Foote II, Carlos Saladrigas, and Carlos de la Cruz. However, a day later Reno made the decision to remove González from the house if the negotiations failed and instructed law enforcement officials to determine the best time to obtain the boy. They decided to hold the raid on either Saturday, April 22, or Monday, April 24, to avoid Good Friday or Easter Sunday. President Bill Clinton urged Reno to keep the negotiations going but approved the raid if they failed.

De la Cruz and Saladrigas convinced Gonzalez's relatives in Miami and their attorney Aaron Podhurst to allow Juan Miguel temporary custody over Elián while custody negotiations took place in a safe house in Miami. However, Juan Miguel and his attorney Gregory B. Craig rejected the deal and demanded that the boy be brought to Washington, D.C. They announced their reservations to the deal on the early morning of April 22, a matter of hours before the raid. Reno subsequently called Lázaro González at 2:00 am asking him to hand Elián over to the United States Marshals Service with the promise that she would fly to Miami in the morning to personally negotiate. However, the family refused out of fear that the government would remove Elián from Miami and that doing so would allow Cuban diplomats to abduct him. Fifteen minutes later, President Clinton and Chief of Staff John Podesta told Reno that she could have more time to negotiate with the family, but that she could order the raid if she so chose. Reno subsequently demanded that the family hand over Elian by 4 am without informing them of the impending raid. After being informed of the decision, Marisleysis said to a United States Department of Justice community relations officer, "You think we just have cameras in the house? If people try to come in, they could be hurt."

=== Seizure and reactions ===
A federal agent retrieves Elián from his relatives' home in Miami. This photo won the 2001 Pulitzer Prize for Breaking News.

In the pre-dawn hours of Saturday, April 22, 2000, agents of the United States Border Patrol's special BORTAC unit, as part of an operation in which more than 130 Immigration and Naturalization Service personnel took part, approached the house, knocked on the door, and identified themselves. When no one responded, they entered. At the same time, pepper-spray and mace were employed against persons outside who attempted to interfere. In the confusion, Armando Gutierrez called in Alan Diaz, of the Associated Press, to enter the house and enter a room with González, his granduncle's wife Angela Lázaro, her niece, the niece's young son, and Donato Dalrymple (one of the two men who had rescued him from the ocean). They waited in the room listening to agents searching the house. Diaz took a widely publicized photograph of a border patrol agent confronting Dalrymple and the boy. INS subsequently flew six-year-old Elian out of Miami aboard a Justice Prisoner and Alien Transportation System aircraft.

INS also stated in the days after the raid that they had identified as many as two dozen persons who were "prepared to thwart any government operation", some of whom had concealed weapons while others had criminal records.

Approximately 100 people protested against the raid as it took place, with some of them calling the INS agents "assassins". Then-New York City Mayor Rudy Giuliani described BORTAC agents involved in the seizure of Elian as "storm troopers" at least six times. Federal Law Enforcement Officers Association reacted with "strong disgust and dismay" to the Nazi imagery and demanded Giuliani's apology. Hillary Clinton, then running against Giuliani for the 2000 United States Senate election in New York, agreed with FLEOA in asking for an apology. Giuliani refused to apologize, although he stated his criticism was aimed at President Clinton and Attorney General Reno. He later withdrew from the race for unrelated reasons.

Public opinion about the INS raid on the Miami González's house was widely polarized. There were two major focuses in media coverage of the event: the raid and the family reunions. A Time magazine issue showed a photo of a joyful González being reunited with his father (the caption says "Papa!"), while Newsweek ran an issue that focused on the raid, entitled "Seizing Elián".

The struggle between González's American family and his father was portrayed in the 2000 television film, A Family In Crisis: The Elian Gonzales [sic] Story, which starred Esai Morales as Elián's father, Juan Miguel Gonzalez; Laura Harring as Elián's cousin Marisleysis Gonzalez; and Alec Roberts in the title role.

Despite the reactions, González has openly stated that he did in fact support his return to Cuba.

=== Return to father's custody ===
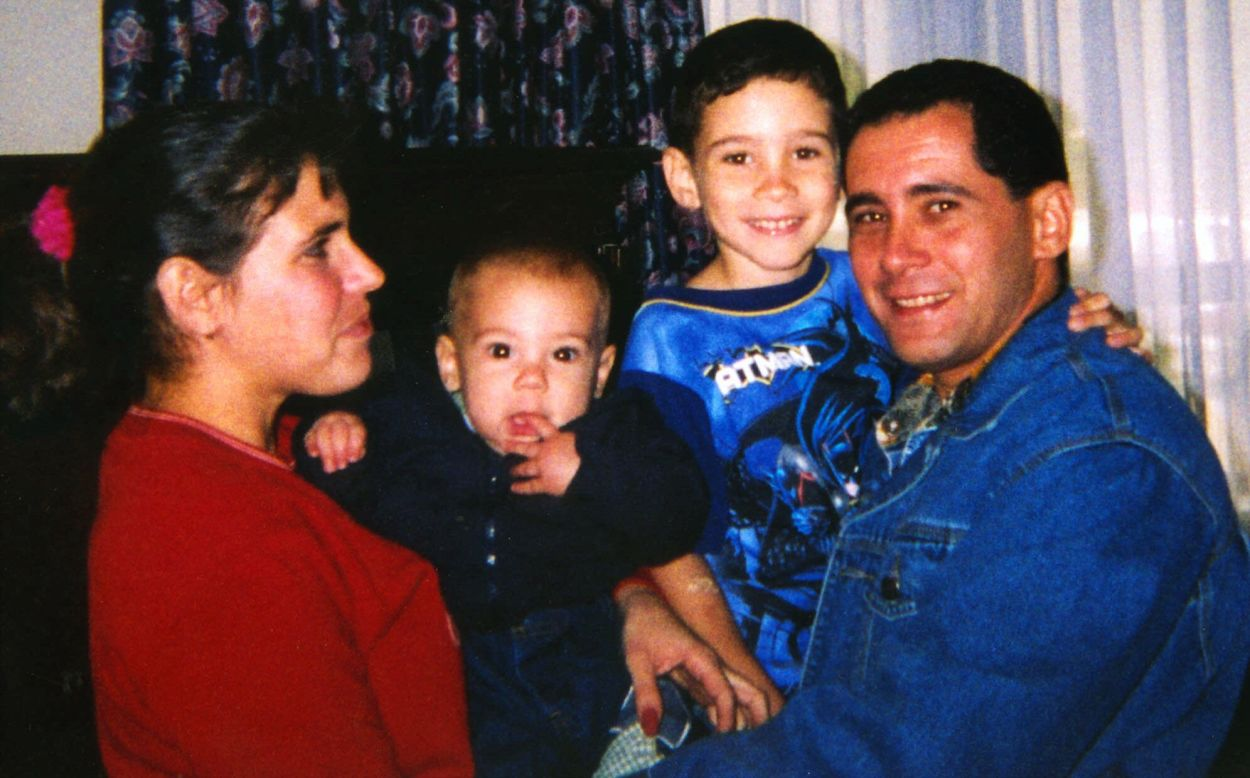
González, being held by his father, with his stepmother and half-brother in a photo taken a few hours after their reunion at Andrews Air Force Base in 2000

Four hours after he was taken from the house in Miami, González and his father were reunited at Andrews Air Force Base. The next day, the White House released a photograph showing a smiling González reunited with his father, which the Miami relatives disputed by stating that it was a fake González in the photograph. Later, González and his family were taken to the Aspen Institute Wye River Conference Center in Maryland (formerly known as "Wye Plantation"). The media were barred from access to the family.

While the family was still at Andrews, the Miami González relatives flew to Washington demanding to see Elián. They and their escort, New Hampshire senator Bob Smith, were turned away from the base by guards. The May 5, 2000, Miami Herald reported that González was joined by his classmates (without their parents) and his teacher from his hometown, Cárdenas. The newspaper Granma released pictures of Elián in his José Martí Pioneer Organization uniform. On May 6, 2000, attorney Craig took González and Juan Miguel to a dinner in the Georgetown neighborhood of Washington, DC, hosted by Smith and Elizabeth Bagley.

After González was returned to his father's custody, he remained in the U.S. while the Miami relatives exhausted their legal options. A three-judge federal panel had ruled that he could not go back to Cuba until he was granted an asylum hearing, but the case turned on the right of the relatives to request that hearing on behalf of the boy. On June 1, 2000, the 11th U.S. Circuit Court of Appeals ruled that Elián was too young to file for asylum; only his father could speak for him, and the relatives lacked legal standing. On June 28, 2000, the U.S. Supreme Court declined to review the decision. In the afternoon of the same day, seven months and one week after Elián González left Cuba, he and his family, along with his classmates and teacher, boarded two chartered planes at Dulles International Airport in Dulles, Virginia, for José Martí International Airport in Havana. In 2016, Gonzalez would publicly praise Cuban leader Fidel Castro's efforts to return him to Cuba, stating "Fidel was a friend who at a difficult moment was with my family, with my father, and made it possible for me to return to my father, to return to Cuba."

=== Political ramifications ===
Commentators have suggested that the Elián González affair may have been a factor in voters' decisions in the 2000 United States presidential election, which was decided by the United States Supreme Court's Bush v. Gore decision halting the 2000 United States presidential election recount in Florida and awarding the state's 25 electoral votes to the Republican Party candidate George W. Bush. The Gonzalez case is believed to have been a major factor in Bush's narrow lead in the state as the raid caused Cuban-Americans in Florida to strongly favor him over the Democratic Party nominee Al Gore. Polls in 2001 indicated that Bush captured 80 percent of the Florida Cuban-American vote in 2000, 50,000 votes more than the previous Republican nominee Bob Dole's 65 percent of the Florida Cuban-American vote in the 1996 United States presidential election. Later, the 2020 HBO documentary 537 Votes argued that Bush may have achieved as high as 88 percent of the Florida Cuban-American vote. Gore's handling of the matter may have angered the predominantly Republican Cuban community over the boy's return to Cuba. Gore initially supported Republican legislation to give the boy and his father permanent residence status, but later supported the administration position. He was attacked by both sides in the dispute for his equivocal position.

In Cuba, the Elián González matter generated popular mobilization across the island seeking González's return. Acting on the popular sentiment, Fidel Castro launched a campaign called the Battle of Ideas, which centered on a series of educational initiatives designed to advance socialist ideals including the revolutionary New Man.

== Life in Cuba ==
=== Youth and schooling ===
After his return to Cuba, Elián González lived with his father, stepmother, and three brothers in Cárdenas, where his father, Juan Miguel, was a waiter at an Italian restaurant at Josone Park, in Varadero, near Cárdenas. Elián's father was interviewed at the restaurant in 2004 by Keith Morrison of the NBC News program Dateline NBC and Cover to Cover on CNBC. Juan Miguel filmed a home video on which González was shown doing his arithmetic homework with him in their dining room, going to bed in his bedroom with his two younger half-brothers, and attending karate lessons.

Morrison's TV report also showed an 18th-century building in Cárdenas which was previously used as a fire station and which was renovated and inaugurated on July 14, 2001, as a museum, called Museo de la Batalla de Ideas ("Museum of the Battle of Ideas"), which includes an exhibition room dedicated to González, which houses a life-size bronze statue of González raising a clenched fist. The former González home in Miami has similarly been turned into a museum, with the boy's bedroom left unaltered. Juan Miguel is also a member of the National Assembly of People's Power and has attended events for the Communist Party of Cuba with González, who has been called up to the stage to meet Fidel Castro.

In September 2005, González was interviewed by 60 Minutes and stated during the interview that Fidel Castro was a friend, and that he considers Castro "not only as a friend but as a father"; González's aunt, Angela González, said she doubted whether the interview represented his true beliefs because of the controls imposed by Cuba on information. In December 2006, an ill Fidel Castro was unable to attend González's 13th birthday celebration, so his brother Raúl attended instead.

On August 16, 2006, the United States Court of Appeals for the Eleventh Circuit affirmed the dismissal of an excessive force lawsuit brought by Dalrymple and others against the federal government and Reno.

González joined the Young Communist Union of Cuba in June 2008 shortly after graduating from junior high school. At age 15, he began military school. In a November 2013 speech, González described his time in the United States as "very sad times for me, which marked me for my whole life", asserting that the Cuban Adjustment Act led to the denial of his rights, including "the right to be together with my father, the right to keep my nationality and to remain in my cultural context".

=== College and political career ===
In the 2010s, González studied to be an industrial engineer, and hoped to marry his high school girlfriend and fiancée after finishing college. In July 2016, he received a degree in industrial engineering from the University of Matanzas, and read a letter to Fidel Castro from his graduating class, vowing "to fight from whatever trench the revolution demands". After graduating in 2016, González began working as a technology specialist at a state-run company that makes large plastic water tanks. On Father's Day in 2020, González announced that he and his fiancée were expecting a daughter within the following months.

In 2013, González led the Cuban delegation to the 18th World Festival of Youth and Students in Quito, Ecuador. In an interview with CNN en Español he said his mother's death on was the fault of the economic underdevelopment of the country caused by the United States embargo against Cuba. He added, "But, despite that, Cuba, even with all its problems has progressed over the years [which] is all thanks to Cuba’s courage, our dignity, our continued fight for a more just model." González also stated that he was happy that he did not stay in the United States, and believes that he would have been manipulated into becoming a "performer" for the Cuban dissident movement and the American media. He also stated, "I don't profess to have any religion, but if I did my God would be Fidel Castro."

In 2015, González was elected to lead his local Committee for the Defense of the Revolution, prompting speculation that he was preparing for a political career. In an interview that year with Granma, the official newspaper of the Communist Party of Cuba (COC), González said "I hope Cuba develops, and I believe we are going down the right path. I think it’s important to continue contributing even more to the country’s economic development." However he also remarked that if Cuba were to "stop being a socialist country, and give way to capitalism", in that pursuit, it would not ultimately be successful; "it would be a colony, it would be Haiti, a poor country, a lot poorer than it is now, and everything that has been achieved would be lost." In another interview with ABC News, he reiterated his condemnation of the U.S. embargo and his satisfaction with the outcome of the custody dispute, but expressed hope for better Cuba–United States relations in the future and stated he would like to return to the United States one day "to give my love to the American people".

In 2017, González participated in a documentary about his life called Elián. The film premiered on April 19, 2017, at the Tribeca Film Festival. It opened in limited release in May, and appeared on CNN Films in August 2017.

González was nominated by the municipal assembly of Cárdenas to run as its candidate for the National Assembly of People's Power in the 2023 Cuban parliamentary election. He was elected unopposed along with the CPC's slate of 470 candidates and sworn into office in April 2023.

== See also ==
- Cuban exile
- Cuba–United States relations
- Operation Peter Pan (1960–1962)
- Parental rights
- Yossele Schumacher affair, a similar occurrence
- Polovchak v. Meese, an earlier child asylum case (1980–1985), viewed by some as a precedent
