= Allan Dias =

Allan Dias may refer to:

- Allan Dias (Indian footballer) (born 1986), Indian football midfielder
- Allan Dias (Brazilian footballer) (born 1988), Brazilian football attacking midfielder for São Bernardo

== See also ==
- Alan Diaz (1947–2018), American photographer
