= U of H =

U of H may refer to:

== Universities ==
=== Africa ===
- University of Hargeisa, a Somaliland public university in Hargeisa

=== Americas ===
- Université d'État d'Haïti (University of Haiti), a Haitian university in Port-au-Prince
- University of Havana, a Cuban university in Havana
- University of Hawaiʻi, a US public, co-educational college and university system in Hawaii
- University of Henrico, an aborted English university in Henricus, Virginia
- University of Holguín, a Cuban university in Holguín
- University of Houston, a US university in Houston, Texas

=== Asia ===
- University of Ha'li, a Saudi university in Ha'li
- University of Haifa, an Israeli university in Haifa
- University of Haripur, a Pakistani university in Haripur
- University of Hyderabad, an Indian university in Hyderabad
- University of Hyogo, a Japanese university in Kobe

=== Europe ===
- University of Harderwijk, a Dutch university in Harderwijk
- University of Helmstedt, a Brunswickan university in Helmstedt
- University of Helsinki, a Finnish university in Helsinki
- University of Huelva, a Spanish university in Huelva

==== England ====
- University of Hertfordshire, a university in Hatfield
- University of Huddersfield, a university in Huddersfield
- University of Hull, a university in Hull
- University of Lincoln (previously the University of Humberside), a university in Lincoln

==== Germany ====
- University of Hagen, a university in Hagen
- University of Halle, university merged in 1817 to become the Martin Luther University of Halle-Wittenberg
- University of Hamburg, a university in Hamburg
- University of Hannover, today known as the Leibniz University Hannover
- University of Hildesheim, a university in Hildesheim
- University of Hohenheim, a university in Stuttgart

== Other ==
- Union of Horodło, a set of three acts signed in the town of Horodło on October 2, 1413
- Use of Hereford, a variant of the Roman Rite used in Herefordshire before the English Reformation
