= University of Las Tunas =

Coordinates: 20.96229°N 76.92930°W

- Universidad de Las Tunas
- Type: Public
- Established: 2009; 17 years ago
- Location: Las Tunas, Cuba

The University of Las Tunas (Spanish: Universidad de Las Tunas, ULT) is a public university located in Las Tunas, Cuba. It was founded in 2009 and is organized in 4 Faculties.

== See also ==
- Education in Cuba
- List of colleges and universities in Cuba
- Las Tunas
