= Jeffery M. Leving =

American divorce attorney and author (born 1951)

- Jeffery M. Leving (right) with Barack Obama
- Born: Jeffery M. Leving; July 2, 1951 (age 75); Chicago, Illinois, U.S.
- Education: Southern Illinois University (B.S.); Illinois Institute of Technology Chicago-Kent College of Law (J.D.)
- Occupation: Family law attorney
- Known for: Attorney, author
- Website: www.dadsrights.com

Jeffery M. Leving (born July 2, 1951) is an American divorce attorney and author who specializes in matrimonial and family law. He is known primarily for his vocal advocacy of fathers' rights and hosts two radio shows. His television and radio commercials are well known in the Chicago area.

== Early life and education ==
Leving was born in Chicago and raised on its South Side. His father worked as a bartender and tailor while pursuing success as an artist. Leving was deeply affected by the divorce of his parents in 1967, when he was 16.

Leving attended Senn High School on Chicago's North Side then graduated from Southern Illinois University in 1974 with a Bachelor of Science in Radio and Television. He received his Juris Doctor from the Illinois Institute of Technology Chicago-Kent College of Law in 1979.

== Legal career ==
Leving is licensed to practice in Illinois, the U.S. District Court for the Northern District of Illinois, the U.S. 7th Circuit Court of Appeals, and the U.S. Supreme Court.

in 1979, Leving became a staff attorney for the Chicago Volunteer Legal Services Foundation, and in 1981 joined a firm that allowed him to use their offices to start his own practice during his spare hours, "focusing on family law, divorce, paternity, and child custody". Leving's accomplishments include the co-authorship of the Illinois Joint Custody Law, Illinois Virtual Visitation, Right to DNA Testing Notice, and Unlawful Visitation or Parenting time Interference Laws. He also delivered testimony before both branches of the Illinois Legislature on Joint Custody, Grandparent's Visitation and Child Support Accountability bills.

Leving and father's rights activist Glenn Sacks have argued that parenting time interference can result from the custodial parent's relocation beyond a practical distance from the noncustodial parent, and have campaigned for a rebuttable presumption prohibiting such relocations. In 1985, Leving helped draft the Illinois Joint Custody Law, allowing judges to assign divorcing parents equal responsibility for raising their children. Leving worked for its passage in the Illinois General Assembly, and "is credited with generating much of the pressure that got the bill passed". By 1991, Leving was described as "one of the most recognizable names among Chicago lawyers".

In 2000, Leving was a lawyer in the case of 6-year-old Elián González, who was rescued after being found tied to an inner tube off the coast of Ft. Lauderdale, Florida. Gonzalez's mother drowned in her attempt to flee Cuba to the United States, and the child's presence in the U.S. involved contentious court proceedings. When the case was considered by the U.S. Supreme Court, Leving had previously spearheaded the amicus brief, which set the foundation of the custody case to reunite Elian Gonzalez with his father, Juan Miguel, in Cuba. Manuel Gonzalez, Elian Gonzalez’s great uncle, later retained Leving to reunite Elian with his father. Leving appeared as an expert on CNN, CNBC, MSNBC, Fox National News and Court TV to analyze the Elian Gonzalez case.

In 2011 Leving represented 20-year-old Mariah Yeater in a paternity claim against singer Justin Bieber, accused by Yeater of impregnating her following a reported brief sexual encounter after one of his Los Angeles concerts. Leving actively pushed for Bieber's legal team to arrange a DNA test.

Leving has frequently espoused legal reforms on radio and television shows, such as the Oprah Winfrey Show.

On September 20, 2024, Leving was suspended from the practice of law for five months, with the suspension stayed after 60 days by a two-year period of conditional probation, by the Illinois Attorney Registration Disciplinary Commission (ARDC). Several complaints made to the ARDC alleged that Leving's law firm "charged clients hundreds of thousand of dollars for legal services despite accomplishing little in their cases." Mr. Leving was found to have charged and collected excessive legal fees in eight domestic relations matters between June 2014 and October 2021. The suspension became effective on October 11, 2024.

== Writing and artistry ==
Leving is the author of three books:

- Fathers' Rights (Basic Books, 1997) presents advice for fathers involved in a custody dispute.
- Divorce Wars: A Field Guide to Winning Tactics, Preemptive Strikes, and Top Maneuvers When Divorce Gets Ugly (HarperCollins, 1998), provides a step-by-step guide for people going through a difficult divorce.
- How to Be a Good Divorced Dad (Jossey-Bass, 2012), advises fathers who were either divorced or going through a divorce, and included real-life anecdotes from dads who successfully navigated their way through a divorce while maintaining strong, loving relationships with their children. The book "received an endorsement from Francis Cardinal George of the Archdiocese of Chicago and garnered praise from President Barack Obama".

Leving is also the publisher of Leving's Divorce Magazine, a magazine for divorced men that focuses on parenting and men's legal issues.
