= University of Matanzas =

University in Matanzas, Cuba

Coordinates: 23.035°N 81.510°W

University of Matanzas "Camilo Cienfuegos"
- Universidad de Matanzas "Camilo Cienfuegos"
- Type: Public
- Established: 1972; 53 years ago
- Rector: Leyda Finalé de la Cruz
- Undergraduates: 15,000
- Postgraduates: 8,000
- Location: Matanzas, Cuba
- Website: umcc.cu

The University of Matanzas "Camilo Cienfuegos" (Spanish: Universidad de Matanzas "Camilo Cienfuegos", UM) is a public university in Matanzas, Cuba. It was founded in 1972 and is organized in seven faculties.

== Organization ==
The seven faculties are:

- Faculty of Agricultural sciences
- Faculty of Social Sciences and Humanities
- Faculty of Physical Education
- Faculty of Business studies
- Faculty of Modern Languages
- Faculty of Technical Sciences
- Faculty of Education

== See also ==
- Education in Cuba
- List of universities in Cuba
