= University of Pinar del Río =

Public university in Cuba, founded in 1972

Coordinates: 22.4253°N 83.6875°W

University of Pinar del Río "Hermanos Saiz Montes de Oca"
- Universidad de Pinar del Río "Hermanos Saiz Montes de Oca"
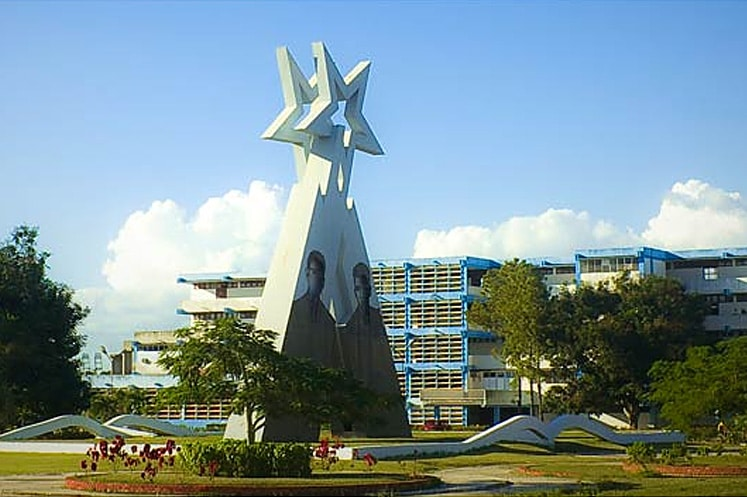
- Type: Public
- Established: 1972; 53 years ago
- Rector: prof.
- Location: Pinar del Río, Cuba
- Website: upr.edu.cu

The University of Pinar del Río "Hermanos Saiz Montes de Oca" (Spanish: Universidad de Pinar del Río "Hermanos Saíz Montes de Oca", UPR) is a public university in Pinar del Río, Cuba. It was founded in 1972 and has seven faculties.

- Faculty of Economics
- Faculty of Social Sciences and Humanities
- Faculty of Technical Sciences
- Faculty of Forestry and Agriculture
- Faculty of Physical Education
- Faulty of Early Childhood Education
- Faculty of Secondary Education

== See also ==
- Education in Cuba
- List of universities in Cuba
