= University of Granma =

University in Bayamo, southern Cuba

Coordinates: 20.28113°N 76.72686°W

- Universidad de Granma
- Type: Public
- Established: 1976; 49 years ago
- Rector: prof. Antonia M. Castillo Ruiz
- Location: Bayamo, Cuba
- Website: www.udg.edu.cu/

The University of Granma (Spanish: Universidad de Granma, UDG) is a public university located in Bayamo, Cuba. It was founded by the Ministry of Higher Education in October 1976 to support agriculture sectors of the province.

== See also ==
- Education in Cuba
- List of colleges and universities in Cuba
- Bayamo
- Granma Province
