= List of colleges and universities in Cuba =

The following is an incomplete list of colleges and universities in Cuba:

== Provincial colleges ==
- Agrarian University of Havana "Fructuoso Rodríguez", Mayabeque (UNAH)
- Central University of Las Villas, Santa Clara (UCLV)
- University of Artemisa (UA)
- University of Camagüey "Ignacio Agramonte Loynaz" (UC)
- University of Ciego de Ávila "Máximo Gómez Báez" (UNICA)
- University of Cienfuegos "Carlos Rafael Rodríguez" (UCF)
- University of Granma (campuses in Bayamo and Manzanillo) (UDG)
- University of Guantánamo (CUG)
- University of Havana (UH)
- University of Holguín "Oscar Lucero Moya" (UHO)
- University of Las Tunas "Vladimir Ilich Lenin" (ULT)
- University of Matanzas "Camilo Cienfuegos" (UMCC)
- University of Pinar del Río "Hnos Saíz Montes de Oca" (UPR)
- University of Sancti Spíritus "José Martí Pérez" (UNISS)
- University of Santiago de Cuba (Universidad de Oriente) (UO)
- University of Isla de la Juventud "Jesús Montané Oropesa" (UIJ)

== Specialized colleges ==
- University of Information Science (UCI)
- Polytechnic Institute "Jose Antonio Echevarria", Havana (commonly known as CUJAE)
- Instituto Superior de Arte, Havana (ISA)

== International colleges ==
- Escuela Internacional de Educación Fisica y Deportes, Havana (EIEFD)
- Latin American School of Medicine in Cuba, Havana (ELAM)
- Escuela Internacional de Cine y Televisión, San Antonio de los Baños (EICTV)

== Higher institutes ==
- Instituto Superior de Tecnologías y Ciencias Aplicadas, Havana (INSTEC)
- Instituto Superior de Diseño, Havana (ISDi)
- Instituto Superior Minero Metalúrgico Dr. Antonio Núñez Jiménez, Moa (ISMMM)
- Instituto Superior de Relaciones Internacionales "Dr. Raúl Roa García", Havana (ISRI)
- Instituto Técnico Militar "José Martí", Havana (ITM)

== Medical colleges ==
- Universidad de Ciencias Médicas de Pinar del Río "Dr. Ernesto Guevara de la Serna" (UCMPR)
- Universidad de Ciencias Médicas de Artemisa (UCMA)
- Universidad de Ciencias Médicas de La Habana "Victoria de Girón" (UCMH)
- Universidad de Ciencias Médicas de Mayabeque, San José de las Lajas (UCMMY)
- Universidad de Ciencias Médicas de Matanzas (UCMMT)
- Universidad de Ciencias Médicas de Villa Clara "Dr. Serafín Ruíz de Zárate Ruíz", Santa Clara (UCMVC)
- Universidad de Ciencias Médicas de Cienfuegos "Dr. Raúl Dorticós Torrado" (UCMCFG)
- Universidad de Ciencias Médicas de Sancti Spiritus "Dr. Faustino Pérez Hernández" (UCMSS)
- Universidad de Ciencias Médicas de Ciego de Ávila "Dr. José Assef Yara" (UCMCAV)
- Universidad de Ciencias Médicas de Camagüey "Dr. Carlos Juan Finlay" (UCMPR)
- Universidad de Ciencias Médicas de Las Tunas "Dr. Zoilo Marinello Vidaurreta" (UCMLT)
- Universidad de Ciencias Médicas de Holguín "Mariana Grajales Cuello" (UCMHo)
- Universidad de Ciencias Médicas de Granma "Celia Sánchez Manduley", Bayamo (UCMGRM)
- Universidad de Ciencias Médicas de Santiago de Cuba (UCMSC)
- Universidad de Ciencias Médicas de Guantánamo (UCMG)
- Universidad de Ciencias Médicas de Isla de la Juventud (UCMIJ)

== See also ==
- Education in Cuba
