= University of Guantánamo =

Public university in Guantánamo, Cuba

University Center of Guantánamo "CUG"
- Centro Universitario de Guantánamo "CUG"
- Type: Public
- Established: May 28, 1997; 28 years ago
- Rector: Dr.Cs Idania Núñez La O
- Location: Guantánamo, Cuba
- Website: www.cug.co.cu

The University Center of Guantánamo (Spanish: Centro Universitario de Guantánamo, CUG) is a public university located in Guantánamo, Cuba. It was founded on May 28, 1997 and is organized in 4 faculties.

== See also ==
- Education in Cuba
- List of universities in Cuba
