= University of Ciego de Ávila =

University of Ciego de Ávila "Máximo Gómez Báez", "UNICA"
- Universidad de Ciego de Ávila "Máximo Gómez Báez", "UNICA"
- Type: Public
- Established: 1978; 47 years ago
- Rector: DrC. Yurisbel Gallardo Ballat
- Location: Ciego de Ávila, Cuba
- Website: www.unica.cu/

The University of Ciego de Ávila "Máximo Gómez Báez" (Spanish: Universidad de Ciego de Ávila "Máximo Gómez Báez", UNICA) is a public university located in Ciego de Ávila, Cuba. It was founded in 1978 and is organized in 7 Faculties.

== Organization ==
These are the 5 faculties in which the university is divided into:

- Faculty of Engineering
- Faculty of Economics
- Faculty of Informatics
- Faculty of Agriculture
- Faculty of Social Sciences and Humanities

== See also ==
- Education in Cuba
- List of universities in Cuba
- Ciego de Ávila
