= Agricultural University of Havana =

University in Mayabeque Province, Cuba

Coordinates: 22°59′54″N 82°08′55″W

Agrarian University of Havana "Fructuoso Rodríguez Pérez"
- Universidad Agraria de La Habana "Fructuoso Rodríguez Pérez"
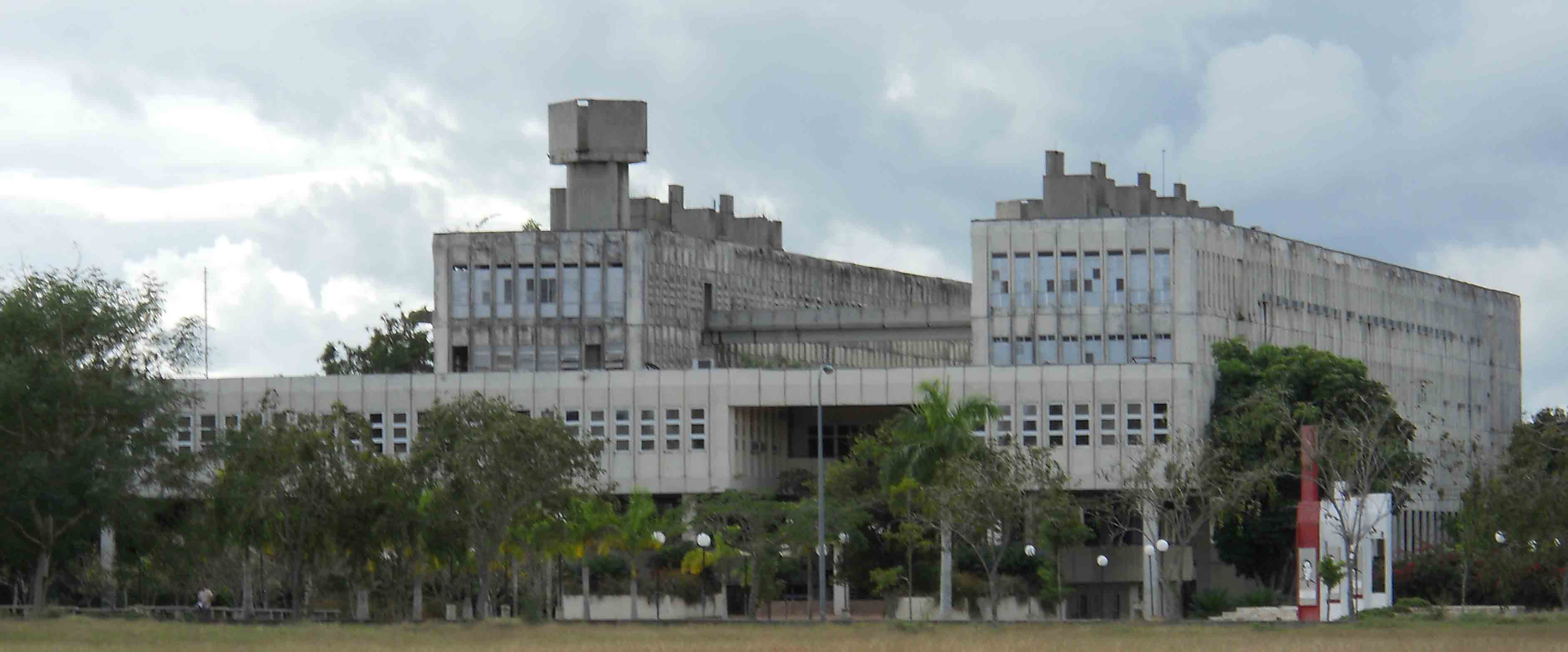
- Type: Public
- Affiliation: MES
- Rector: Adianez Taboada, Ph.D
- Location: San José de las Lajas, Cuba
- Website: www.unah.edu.cu/

The Agrarian University of Havana "Fructuoso Rodríguez Pérez" (Spanish: Universidad Agraria de La Habana "Fructuoso Rodríguez Pérez", UNAH) is a university located in San José de las Lajas, Mayabeque Province, Cuba.

The school was founded in September 1976 as the Higher Institute of Agricultural Sciences of Havana (ISCAH).

== Organization ==
The university is divided into seven faculties:

- Faculty of Agriculture
- Faculty of Social Sciences and Humanities
- Faculty of Economics
- Faculty of Physical Education
- Faculty of Agricultural Engineering
- Faculty of Veterinary Medicine
- Faculty of Informatic Sciences
- Faculty of Pedagogical Science

== See also ==
- Education in Cuba
- Havana
- List of universities in Cuba
