= United Homeless Organization =

Non-profit organization in New York City

- Founded: 1985
- Founder: Steven Riley
- Dissolved: 2010 (forced closure)ii
- Type: 501 (c)(3)j0
- Location(s): 2160 Clinton Ave Suite 5k Bronx, NY 10457
- Region served: Manhattan
- Key people: Stephen Riley, President; Christine Walker, Administrative Assistant
- Revenue: $97,890 USD (2007)
- Employees: 0

The United Homeless Organization was a 501(c)(3) homelessness charity based in New York City. It was disbanded in 2010 after it was ruled to be operating fraudulently.

Founded in 1985 by Stephen Riley, who ran the organization from his apartment in the Bronx, The United Homeless Organization solicited money at sidewalk tables at various locations in Manhattan. Solicitors paid the organization $15 per shift (with 3 to 4 shifts per day) to rent a table and collection jug; any remaining funds raised they could keep for themselves. According to the United Homeless Organization, more than three-quarters of its solicitors were homeless, and all had been homeless at one time.

In November 2009, New York State Attorney General Andrew Cuomo filed suit in New York Supreme Court in Manhattan against the group, charging that the founders kept most of the change collected. The suit charged that Riley and director Myra Walker used the money to buy items for their personal use, and to pay bills unrelated to the United Homeless Organization.

On June 24, 2010, Judge Barbara R. Kapnick ruled that the United Homeless Organization be permanently shut down and further banned Riley and Walker from ever engaging in non-profit work again.
