= Unica (material) =

Vulcanised lump paper material

Unica is a vulcanised lump paper material. It was (and to some extent still is) used to make boxes. The most famous product is probably a lunch box. But unica has also been used to make suitcases, helmets, buttons, shoes and, during the Second World War it was even used to make fuel tanks for Swedish aeroplanes. Many unica products were made by AB Tidan in Mariestad. Nowadays unica boxes are made by Alstermo Bruk in Småland, Sweden.
