= Alan Diaz =

American photographer (1947–2018)

Alan Diaz (May 15, 1947 – July 3, 2018) was an American photographer who won the 2001 Pulitzer Prize for Breaking News Photography for his photograph of the United States Border Patrol's BORTAC team's seizure of Elian Gonzalez.

Diaz was born and raised in New York City and moved to Cuba with his family in 1964. In Cuba, Diaz became a teacher and studied photography with Cuban photographer Korda (Alberto Diaz Gutierrez). He moved to Miami in 1978 and became a photographer and English teacher. He joined the Associated Press as a freelance photographer in 1994 and became a staff photographer in 2000.

Diaz retired from the Associated Press in December 2017 and died on July 3, 2018, aged 71.
