= Higher Institute of Technologies and Applied Sciences =

Cuban educational institution

The Higher Institute of Technologies and Applied Sciences (InSTEC) is a Cuban educational institution that prepares students in the fields of nuclear and environmental sciences. It is the only institution in Cuba that provides the opportunities of studies in these topics and one of the few in Latin America. Its headquarters is in Havana, inside the territory of the “Quinta de los Molinos”. The school offers the high education degree in the following programmes:

- B.Sc. in Nuclear Physics
- B.Eng in Nuclear and Energetic Technologies
- B.Sc. in Radiochemistry
- B.Sc. in Meteorology

Other postgraduate programmes include the Master in Nuclear and Energetic Installations, the Master in Nuclear Physics and Master in Radiochemistry.

== Overview ==
=== Faculties and departments ===
The InSTEC is formed by two faculties. The Faculty of Nuclear Technologies and Sciences (FCTN) is in charge of teaching the three undergraduate programmes related to nuclear sciences as well as the master programmes in the field and is headed by three departments: the Department of Nuclear Engineering, the Department of Nuclear Physics and the Department of Radiochemistry. The Faculty of Environmental Sciences (FaMA) is dedicated to impart the undergraduate degree in Meteorology and associated postgraduate courses and is supervised by two departments: the Department of Meteorology and the Department of Environment. Other departments are in charge of imparting the general sciences. In such a case is the Department of General Physics and Computing.

=== Research ===
The institute develops research in several fields of physics, chemistry and engineering. Topics such as molecular dynamics, determination of heavy metals in organisms and atmosphere and computational modeling of thermo-hydraulic processes are among the main research areas. It counts with labs to develop academic work in physics, chemistry and engineering: labs for mechanics, electromagnetism, optics, nuclear physics and chemistry are focused on developing practical training in the basic sciences and other labs such as the laboratory for electrical machines and the laboratory for electronics are among the ones dedicated to specialized training in these topics.

A scientific forum is celebrated every year. This meeting allows students the possibility to present their own research and main advances in their thesis. Other events that count with many contributions from Junior Researchers and Students from InSTEC are the series of Workshops on Photodynamics and the series of Workshops on Nuclear Physics and Nuclear and Related Techniques organized by the Centre for Technological Applications and Nuclear Developments (CEADEN).

== Governance ==
Until 2011, the institute was directly under the supervision of the Ministry of Sciences, Technologies and Environment (CITMA). It was the only university that was not governed by the Ministry of Higher Education (MES). It is now governed by the MES and is completely ruled by its laws.

== Notable alumni ==
- David Fernandez Rivas, Nuclear Engineer at University of Twente

== See also ==
- List of universities in Cuba
