= University of Holguín =

Public university in Holguín, Cuba

University of Holguin
- Universidad de Holguín
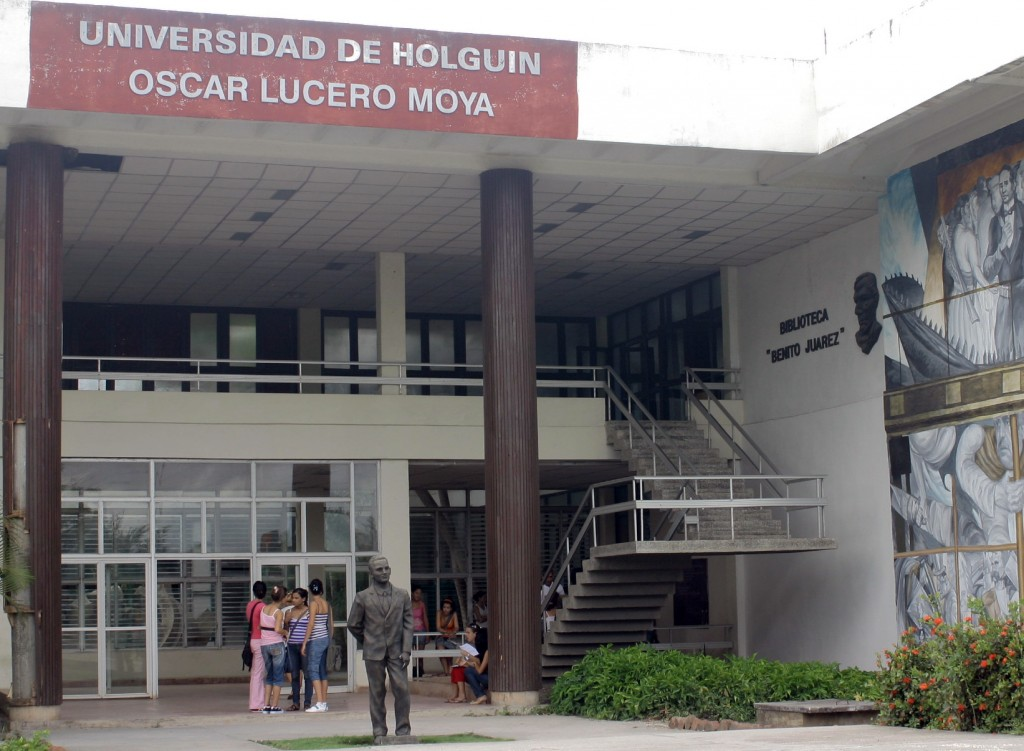
- Motto: Together, Creating the Future
- Type: Public
- Established: 1973; 53 years ago
- Affiliations: AUIP, CLARA
- Rector: Prof. Reynaldo Velázquez Zaldivar, BEng, MS, PhD
- Administrative staff: 1320
- Students: 4296
- Location: Holguín, Cuba; 20°53′19″N 76°15′26″W
- Campus: Oscar Lucero Moya and Celia Sanchez Manduley
- Language: Spanish
- Colours
- Website: www.uho.edu.cu
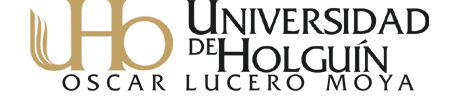

The University of Holguín "Oscar Lucero Moya" (Spanish: Universidad de Holguín "Oscar Lucero Moya", UHO) is a public university located in Holguín, Cuba. It was founded in 1973.

== Organization ==
The university is divided into eight faculties:

- Faculty of Informatics and Mathematics Website
- Faculty of Economics Website
- Faculty of Industrial Engineering and Tourism Website
- Faculty of Engineering Website
- Faculty of Agricultural Sciences Website
- Faculty of Humanities Website
- Faculty of Law Website
- Faculty of Social Sciences Website

== See also ==
- Education in Cuba
- List of universities in Cuba
- Holguín
