= Education in Cuba =

National education budget (2002)
- Budget: $2752 million CP ($246 CP per capita)

General details
- Primary languages: Spanish

Literacy (2011)
- Total: 100.0
- Male: 100.0
- Female: 100.0

Education in Cuba has been a highly ranked system for many years. Following the Cuban Revolution in 1959, the government under Fidel Castro nationalized all educational institutions, and created a government operated system. Illiteracy was eliminated through the campaign. Education expenditures continue to receive high priority. The mean average years of schooling in Cuba is 11.8, as of 2025.

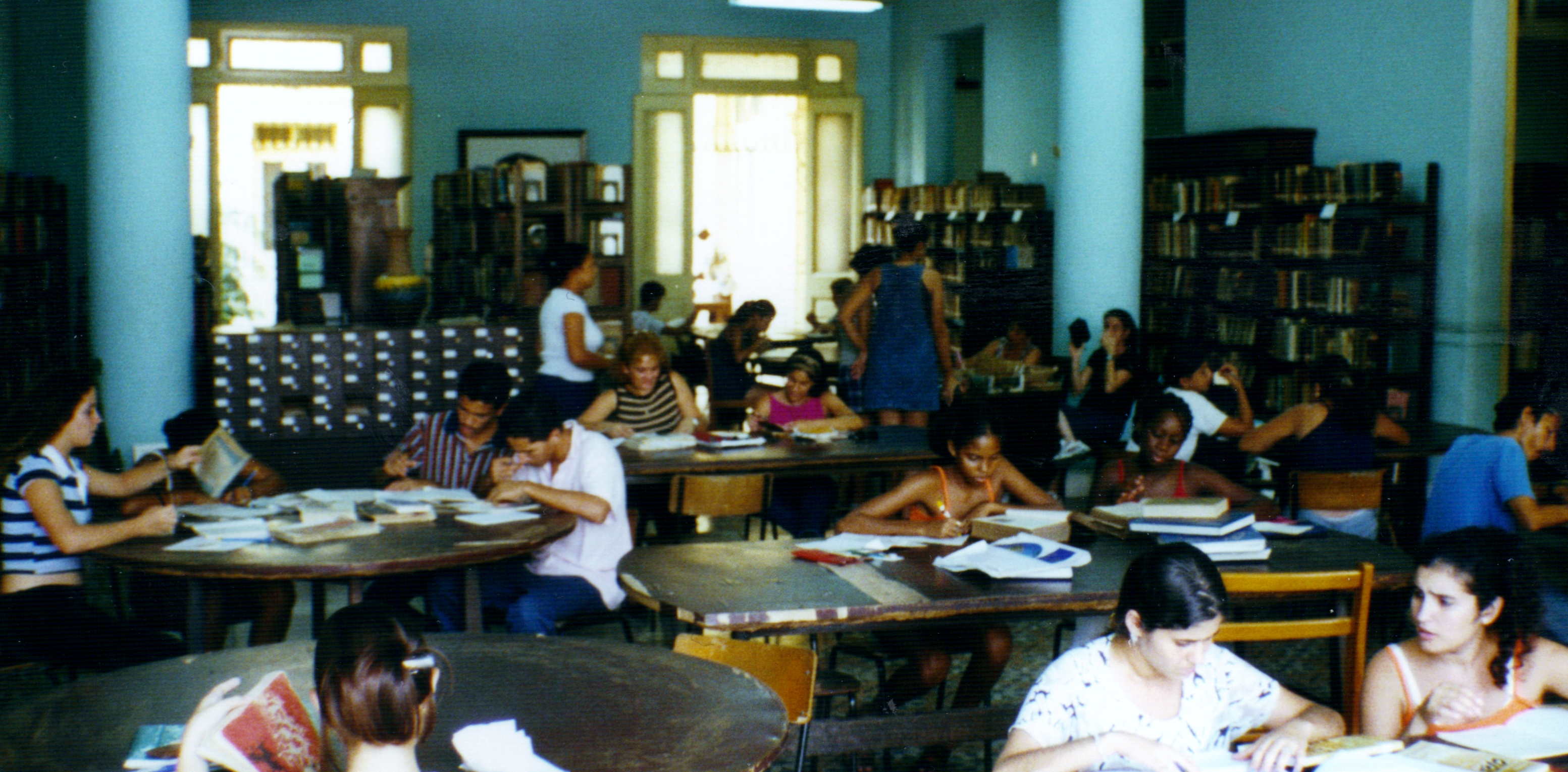
Students studying in Santa Clara

The University of Havana was founded in 1728 and there are a number of other well-established colleges and universities.

== History ==
Spain colonized Cuba from the early 16th century until 1898, when the Treaty of Paris granted the island independence following the Spanish–American War. The University of Havana, founded in 1728, is the oldest university in Cuba and one of the oldest in the Americas.

In 1900, Cuba had a literacy rate of 36.1% – which was quite high for Latin America at the time. By the early 1900s, Cuba had a strong education system, but only half of the country's children participated. Schools remained inaccessible to the poorest Cubans and this resulted in a low literacy-rate for rural areas compared to the cities. The 1953 census found that of the Cubans over the age of 15 years, 22% were illiterate, and 60% of the country was semi-illiterate because many rural Cubans had a third-grade education or less.

Morning flag-raising ceremony at a school in Havana in 2023, where the students salute, while singing the national anthem

Public Education in Cuba has always been free following the Castro Revolution. After students passed the required entrance examination to their particular course of study, even attendance at the University of Havana was tuition-free for the inhabitants of the country and some foreigners. After the Cuban Revolution of 1958–1959, the new government ranked the reconstruction of the education system along Marxist ideological lines as a top priority. Five key objectives were devised and used to frame Cuba's educational system. Many children who lived in distant rural areas were now able to acquire an education provided them by visiting teachers.

Following the basic restructuring and reopening of Cuban schools, the new government focused on the huge literacy problem. By April 1959, 817 literacy centers were opened and, to further reach out to all, young professionals who had strong literacy skills were sent with and other volunteers were sent out to the countryside to teach their fellow Cubans how to read. The Literacy Campaign served two purposes:

- to educate every Cuban and teach them to read
- to give those who live in the city a chance to experience rural living

In a short time, Cuba's new government made vast changes to the education system, and by 2000, 97% of Cubans aged 15 to 24 were literate. Literacy provided poor uneducated Cubans a better standing in the country and the world. Education was vital to the new government. The leaders believed that for Cuba to be strong and for citizens to be active participants in society, they must be educated.

Private universities and schools were nationalized in 1961.

As of 2025, Cuba's literacy rate is universal.

=== Female participation ===
The Cuban Revolution in 1959 brought many changes to the country, especially for women. Before the Revolution many women lived as housewives and for those who needed to work there were very few choices. Many women in rural areas worked in agriculture, and for women in the city, working as a maid or as a sex worker were the only choices. The Federation of Cuban Women (FMC) was founded in August 1960 under the leadership of Vilma Espin with a clear goal to involve all women in Cuban affairs. After years of being excluded, the women of Cuba began to play an active role in the government. The Federation of Cuban Women wanted to see women involved with the social, political, economical, and cultural issues Cuba faced. This required the building of schools and programs to provide multiple services to Cuban women.

The Cuban government instigated Cuban Literacy Campaign to increase Cuba's literacy rate and to initiate communication between the countryside and cities. Students and volunteers went to rural areas to teach people to read and to provide information on current Cuban politics. Rural women received schooling and job training if they chose to receive it, which allowed them to work outside of agriculture. For women working as prostitutes in the cities, the new government created programs to reeducate them once prostitution in Cuba was suppressed in 1961. Separate but similar programs were set up for maids, offering schooling and job training along with free daycare and housing.

== Quality ==
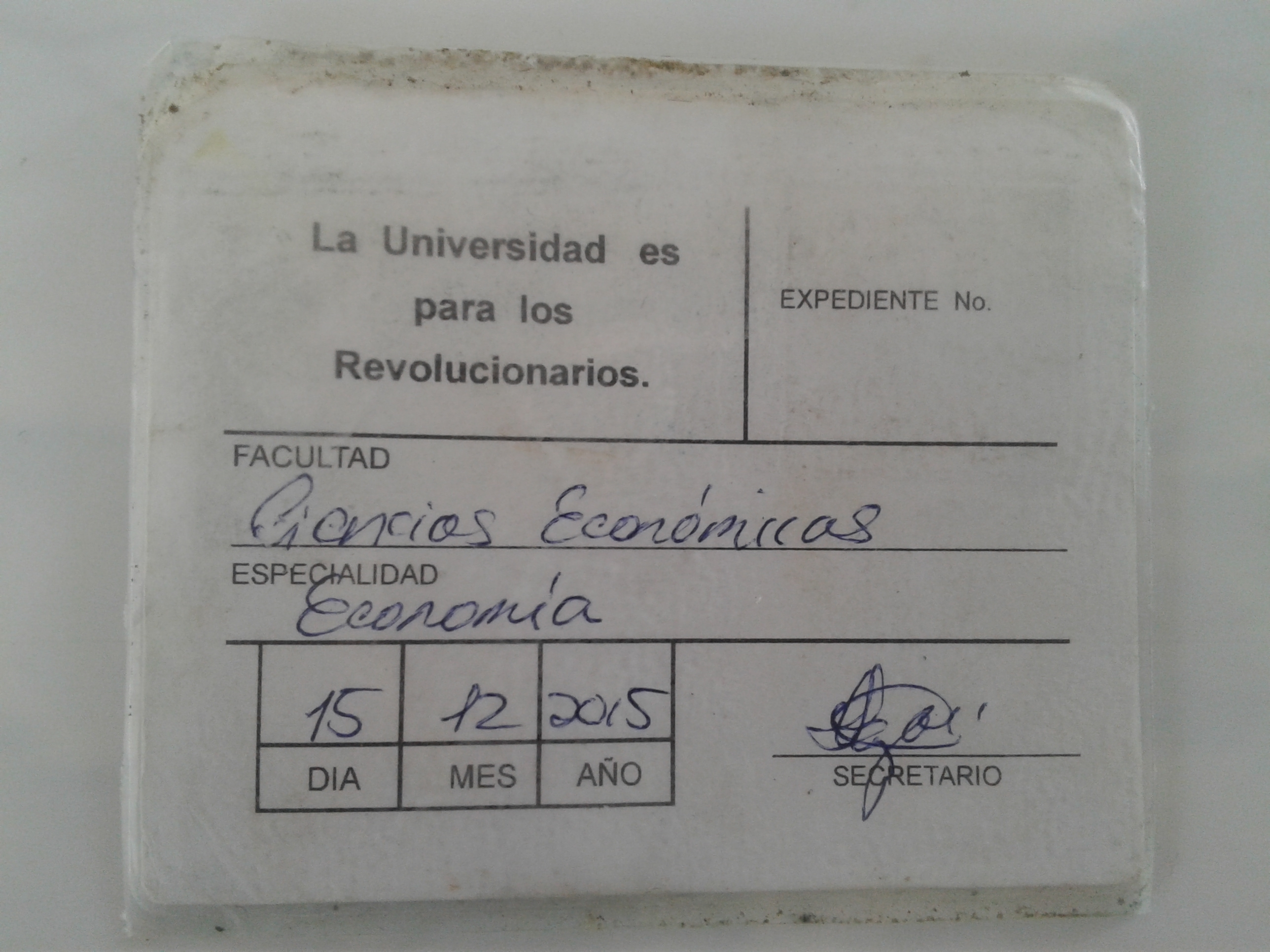
A Cuban college membership card depicting the phrase "La Universidad es para los Revolucionarios" (Spanish for: "University is for the Revolutionares") in the upper left corner.

Cuba has a highly educated population.

A 1998 study by UNESCO reported that Cuban students showed a high level of educational achievement. Cuban third and fourth graders scored 350 points, 100 points above the regional average in tests of basic language and mathematics skills. The report indicated that the test achievement of the lower half of students in Cuba was significant higher than the test achievement of the upper half of students in other Central and South American countries in the study group.

The 1998 study by UNESCO was taken during the height of an economic depression; Cuba's economic development has been severely restricted by the U.S. trade embargo. Cuba is one of the poorest countries in the region and lacks basic resources yet still leads Latin America in primary education in terms of standardized testing.

For the past forty years, education has been a top priority for the Cuban government. Cuba's expenditure on education is at 10% of GNP.

The Cuban education system has faced teacher shortages in recent years. According to the U.S. Department of State, "[a]n emphasis on ideological indoctrination permeates all levels of Cuban educational system, but is enforced unevenly."

== Primary and secondary education ==
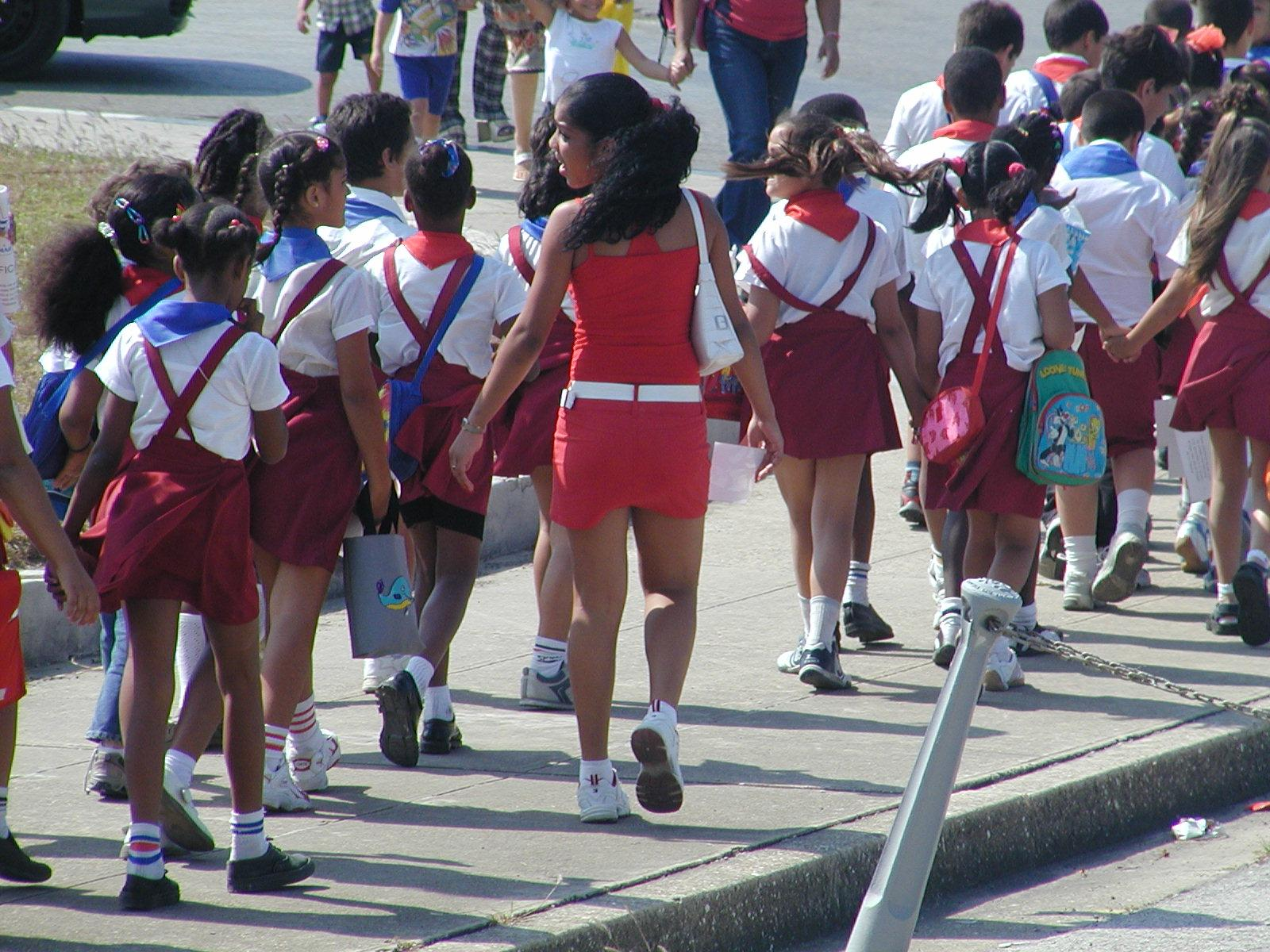
Schoolchildren in Havana

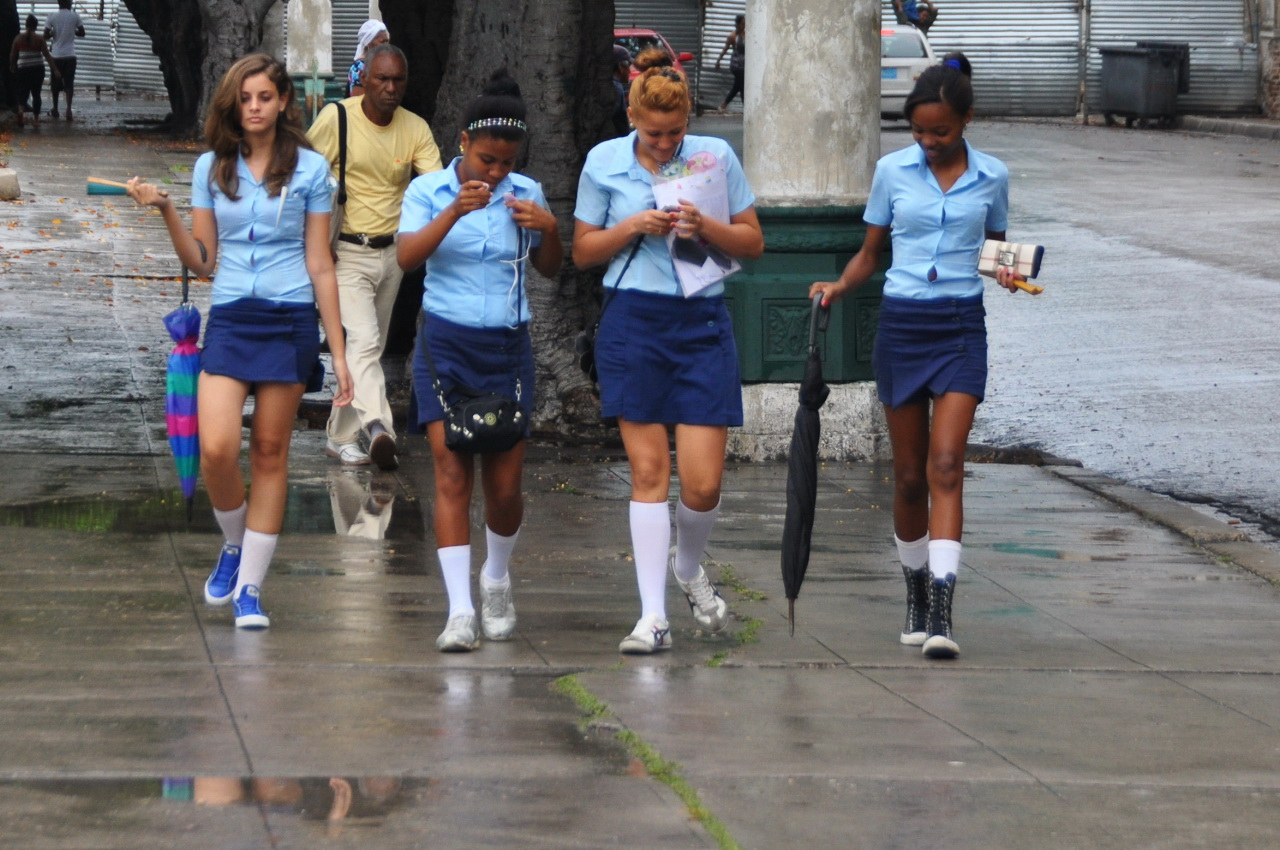
School students in Havana, 2012.

As of 2025, the average years of schooling in Cuba are 11.8.

School attendance is compulsory from ages 6 to 15 or 16 (end of basic secondary education) and all students, regardless of age or sex, wear school uniforms with the color denoting grade level. Primary education lasts for six years. It consists of grades 1 through 6. Secondary education is divided into basic secondary education and pre-university secondary education. The curriculum in primary and secondary schools is based upon principles of "hard work, self-discipline and love of country". The primary school curriculum includes dance and gardening, lessons on health and hygiene, and Cuban revolutionary history. At the end of basic secondary education, pupils can choose between pre-university education and technical and professional education. Those who complete pre-university education are awarded the Bachillerato. Technical training leads to two levels of qualification - skilled worker and middle-level technician. Successful completion of this cycle gives access to the technological institutes.

In the 2010s, however, the economic crisis in the country, emigration, and low teachers salaries have led to a shortage of educators in primary and secondary schools throughout the island, with schools severely understaffed. There was an increase in private tutoring and private schools that teach English and other subjects. Former teachers of Cuba during this time flocked to the tourism industry for the promise of better wages that was on the rise due to proposed lifted sanctions on tourism by the United States during the Obama administration.

== International students ==
For international students in Cuba, Preparatory facilities offer courses in Spanish. During the 2000–01 school year Cuba allowed 905 U.S. students to visit and study. In 1999 a program was implemented to attract students to study medicine in Cuba from less privileged backgrounds in the United States, Britain and Latin American, Caribbean, and African nations. Cuba currently hosts 3432 medical students from 23 nations studying in Havana.

Cuba has also provided state subsidized education to foreign nationals under specific programs, including U.S. students who are trained as doctors at the Latin American School of Medicine. The program provides for full scholarships, including accommodation, and its graduates are meant to return to the US to offer low-cost healthcare.

== Educational cooperation ==
In 2006 Venezuela and Cuba began jointly sponsoring education programs in El Palomar, Bolivia. Cuba also maintains close co-operation on education with the United Kingdom and other nations in the European Union. In 2002 the Minister for Education in the Welsh Assembly Government Jane Davidson and representatives of the Universities of Swansea and Glamorgan in Wales visited Cuba to create provisions for officials in Britain and Cuba to liaise over educational projects. In the United States, the Cuban and Caribbean Studies Institute, a part of Tulane University, has developed relations with Cuban counterpart organizations for the purposes of academic collaboration and exchange, curricular development, cultural exchange and international development and dialogue.

== See also ==
- List of universities in Cuba
- List of education articles by country
- Higher Institute of Technologies and Applied Sciences – a Cuban educational institution that prepares students in the fields of nuclear and environmental sciences
- International School of Havana
